= BC Rytas =

Basketball team in Vilnius, Lithuania

- 2026–27 BC Rytas season
- Nickname: Juodai baltai raudoni (The Black White Reds)
- Leagues: Lithuanian Basketball League (LKL); Champions League
- Founded: 1963 (as Statyba) ^{‡} 1997 (as BC Lietuvos rytas)
- History: Statyba; 1963–1997; Statyba-Lietuvos rytas 1997–1998; Lietuvos rytas 1998–2018; Rytas; 2018–present
- Arena: Arena Vilnius; Active Vilnius Arena
- Capacity: 11,000; 2,741
- Location: Vilnius, Lithuania
- Team colors: Black, white, red
- Team manager: Mantvydas Dabašinskas
- Head coach: Nedas Pacevičius
- Team captain: Artūras Gudaitis
- Ownership: Darius Gudelis (main), Vilnius City Municipality, Perlas and Norvelita
- Affiliations: Rytas-2 (NKL); Rytas MRU (RKL)
- Championships: 2 EuroCup; 1 FIBA Champions League; 1 North European League; 7 Lithuanian Leagues; 2 King Mindaugas Cups; 3 Lithuanian Cups; 3 Baltic Leagues; 1 BBL Cup
- Retired numbers: 3 (5, 7, 13)
- Website: Official website
Home	Away

Basketball Club Rytas, commonly referred to as Rytas Vilnius, is a basketball club based in Vilnius, Lithuania. The club competes in the Lithuanian Basketball League (LKL), the top tier of Lithuanian basketball, and internationally in the Basketball Champions League (BCL) since 2020.

The club plays its home matches in the 2,741-capacity Active Vilnius Arena, with select domestic and all international matches played at the 10,000-capacity Arena Vilnius. For the 2026–27 season, all games will be played at the Arena Vilnius.

Nicknamed juodai baltai raudoni (The Black White Reds), Rytas are one of the most successful basketball clubs in Lithuania. Domestically, the club has won seven league titles, three LKF Cups and two King Mindaugas Cups. Internationally, Rytas has won one Basketball Champions League title, two EuroCup titles and three Baltic Basketball League (BBL) titles.

The club's affiliate teams, Rytas-2 and Rytas-MRU, are used for development of young players and compete in the National Basketball League (NKL) and the Regional Basketball League (RKL), respectively.

Notable members of the club include Šarūnas Marčiulionis, Šarūnas Jasikevičius, Ramūnas Šiškauskas, Arvydas Macijauskas, Jonas Valančiūnas, Martynas Gecevičius, Renaldas Seibutis, Simas Jasaitis, Robertas Javtokas, Darius Songaila, Marijonas Petravičius, Rimantas Kaukėnas, Rimas Kurtinaitis, Gintaras Einikis, Deividas Sirvydis, Rokas Giedraitis, Artūras Gudaitis, Ąžuolas Tubelis.

== History ==
=== Origins (1963–1997) ===
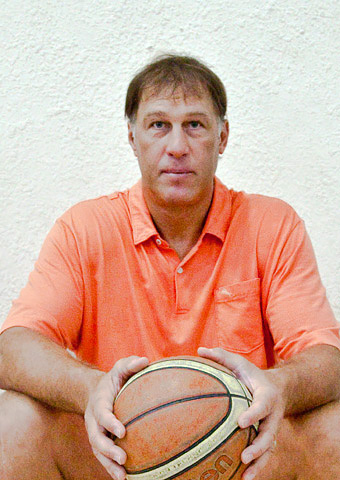
Hall of fame Šarūnas Marčiulionis led BC Statyba from 1981 to 1989

In 1963, the first basketball team from Vilnius, called Žalgiris, was formed. The following year in 1964, it changed its name to Plastikas. In that same year, Plastikas players joined a new team, called Statyba. This name was used for over 30 years.

Jonas Kazlauskas, Rimas Girskis, and then-head coach Rimantas Endrijaitis led Statyba to third place in the 1979 Soviet Union Championship. Three years later, Šarūnas Marčiulionis joined the team and became its leader. In 1987, Artūras Karnišovas joined the team at the age of 16. In 1994, Statyba won bronze medals in their first LKL season.

In 1995, Lietuvos rytas began sponsoring Sūduva Marijampolė, a basketball club from Marijampolė, Lithuania. The partnership lasted for two seasons, during which the team was known as Lietuvos rytas Marijampolė and played in the second-tier Lithuanian league, the LKAL. A notable player for the team was teenager Darius Songaila. However, after the 1996–97 season the partnership ended.

At the same time, Statyba was faced with financial difficulties and was on the verge of bankruptcy. The team needed new investors and in 1997 Lietuvos rytas bought the club. However, the new owners did not want to continue the team's history and renamed it Statyba-Lietuvos rytas, then just Lietuvos rytas. The newspaper's investment helped the club to establish itself as one of the two best in Lithuania, the other being Žalgiris from the country's second-largest city Kaunas.

=== First successes (1997–2004) ===
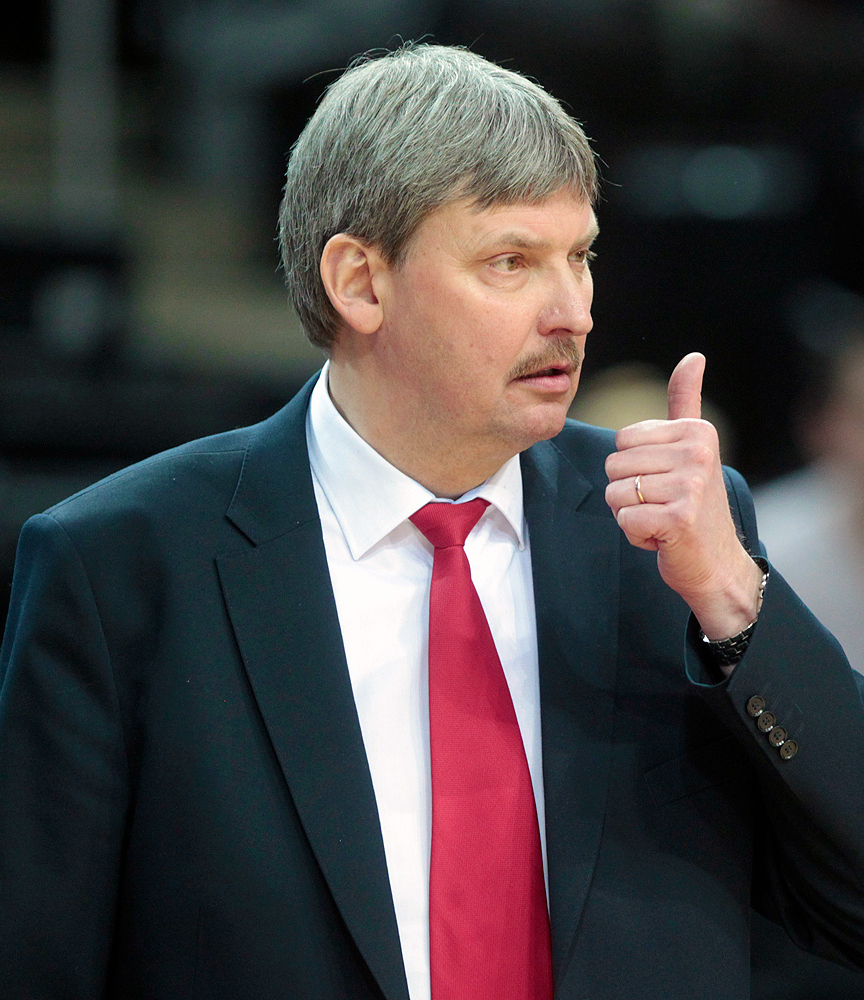
Alfredas Vainauskas, coach of the team 1997–2001.

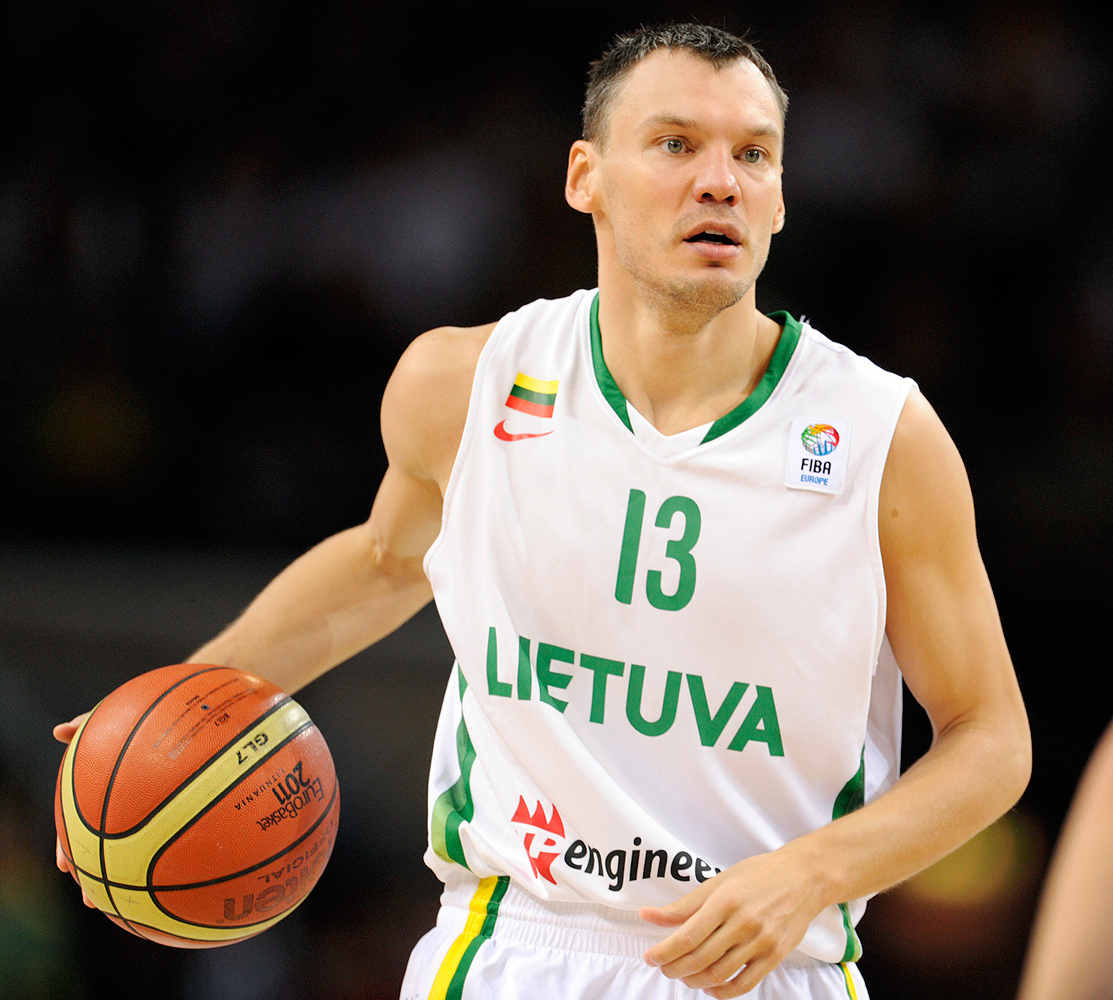
Lithuanian star Šarūnas Jasikevičius started his career in Lietuvos rytas.

During its first season, BC Rytas won a bronze medal in the LKL. In the following season, Rytas won LKL silver, losing to reigning EuroLeague champions Žalgiris Kaunas. The team also took second place in 1997 William Jones Cup.

In 2000, Ramūnas Šiškauskas, Andrius Giedraitis and Eric Elliott, combined with Arvydas Macijauskas and Robertas Javtokas, managed to win LKL. The team was coached by Šarūnas Sakalauskas. It was the first time in the history of the Lithuanian Basketball League that Žalgiris Kaunas did not win the LKL title. Also, Rytas reached the Saporta Cup semifinal, where they met last season's EuroLeague runner-up Kinder. After a home win of 70–60, Lietuvos rytas lost in Italy 83–71, with Šiškauskas missing a three-pointer which would have won the two-game series for his team.

The next season, due to the split between the FIBA and ULEB, Rytas played in the FIBA SuproLeague, making it to the quarterfinals, but losing to Anadolu Efes S.K. The team won third place in the NEBL. In the LKL finals, Žalgiris Kaunas defeated Lietuvos rytas in a tough five-game series 3–2.

In 2002, Lietuvos rytas won the LKL again, this time in a seven-game final series with the last game decided in overtime. The team played without center Robertas Javtokas, who was seriously injured in a motorbike crash. Lietuvos rytas also won the NEBL title in 2002, becoming the last team to win the tournament. The team held first place in the group stage of the Saporta Cup but lost in the quarterfinals to Hapoel Jerusalem.

Over the next two seasons, Lietuvos rytas lost in the LKL finals to Žalgiris Kaunas. They had more success in Europe, though, finishing in second place in the FIBA Champions Cup regional stage (though losing to Hemofarm Vršac in the final stage). The team also debuted in the ULEB Cup, getting to the quarterfinals but losing to Hapoel Jerusalem.

=== Success in the ULEB Cup and Euroleague (2004–2008) ===
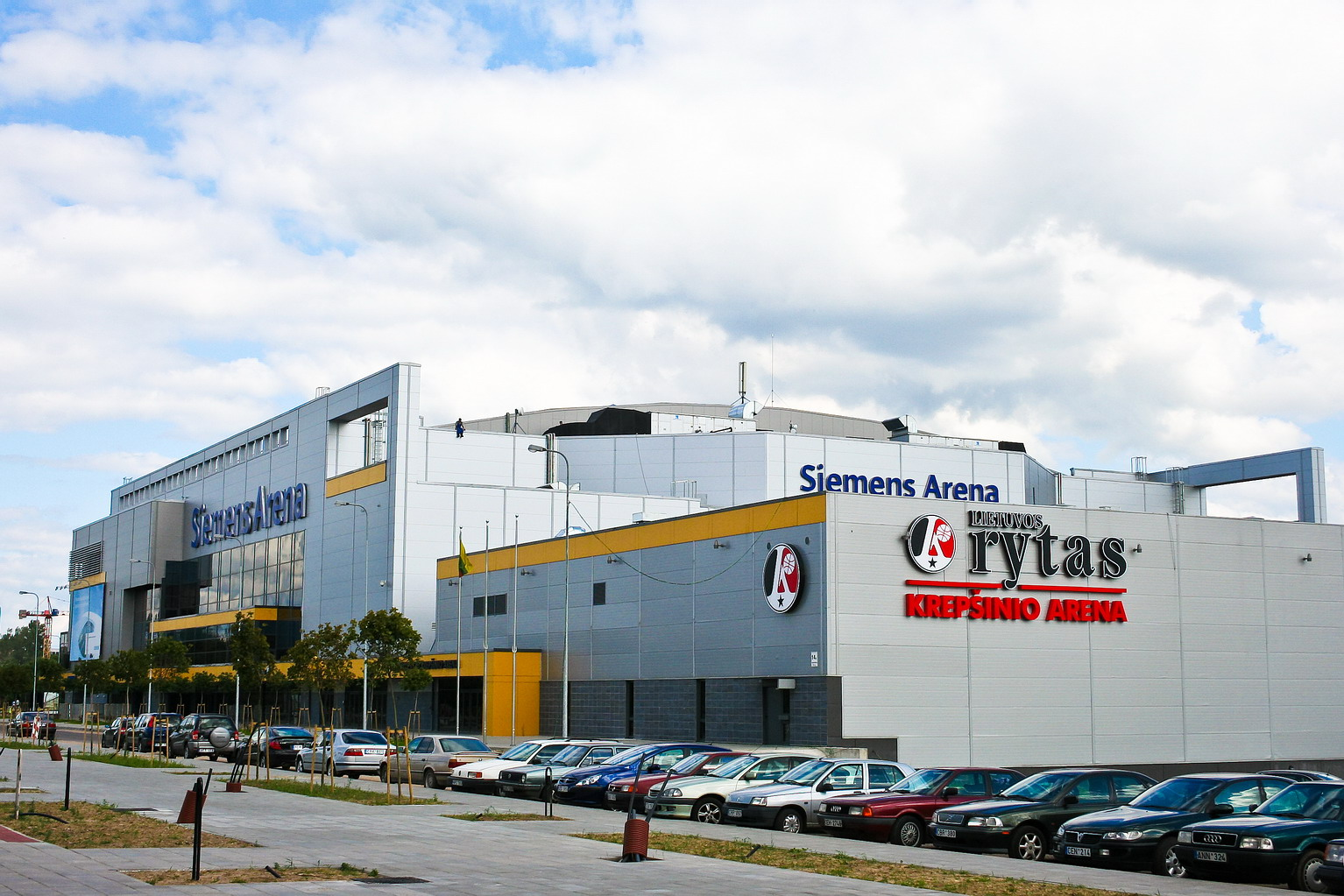
Lietuvos rytas and Siemens arenas, opened 2004

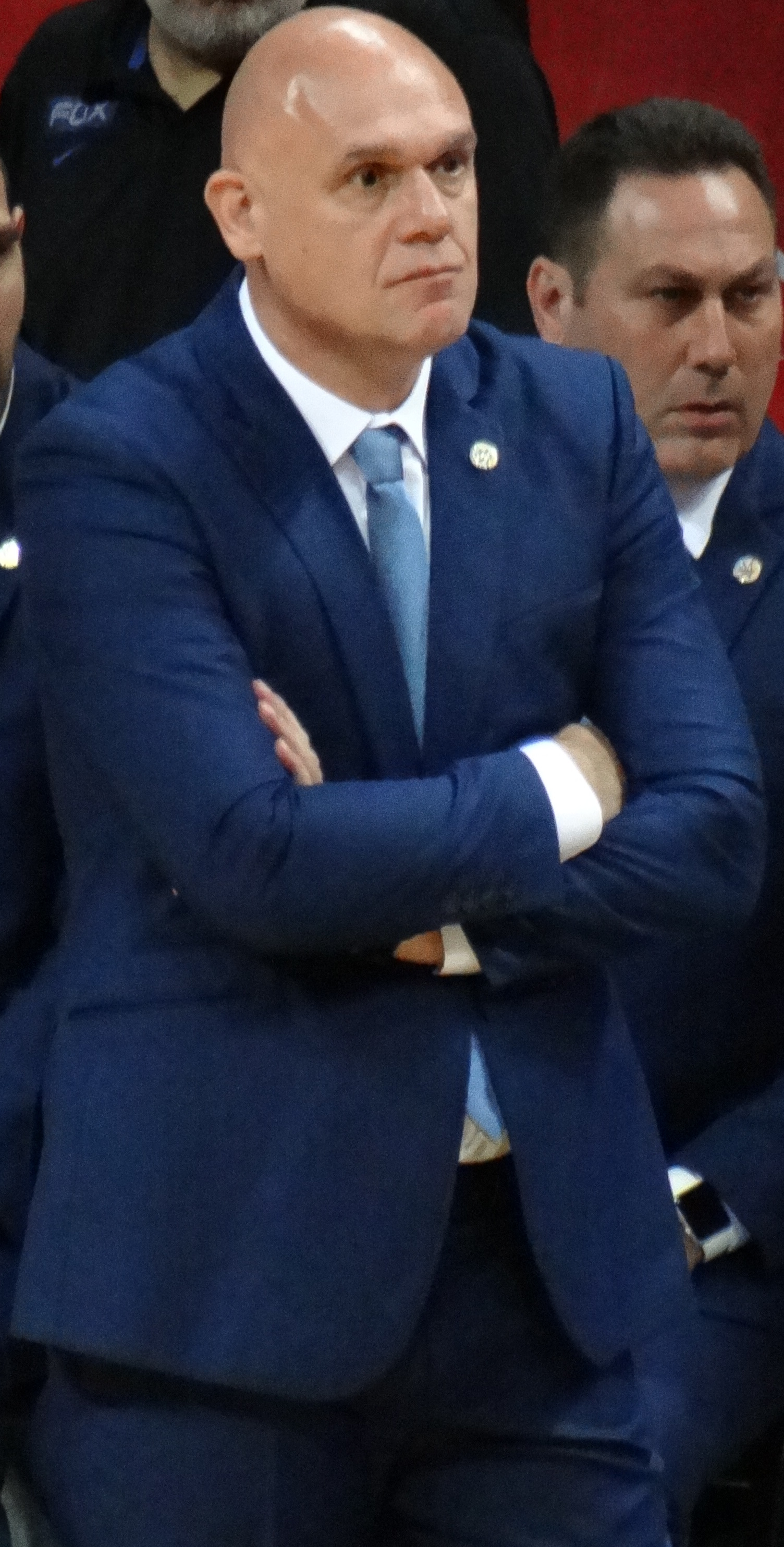
Neven Spahija, coach for the 2005–06 season

==== 2004–05: ULEB Cup champions ====
After not winning any titles in the past two seasons, Lietuvos rytas recruited Vlade Đurović as a new coach. Midway through the season, Frederick House, the team leader, suffered a season-ending injury. Đurović later resigned and was replaced by Tomo Mahorič. Tyrone Nesby, Roberts Štelmahers and Robertas Javtokas, Simas Jasaitis and Tomas Delininkaitis led the team to victory in the 2005 ULEB Cup, beating Pamesa Valencia in the semifinals and Makedonikos in the final. This victory granted them a place in the EuroLeague, the continent's primary basketball club tournament. Lietuvos rytas won second place in both the LKL and BBL finals, losing to Žalgiris Kaunas.

==== 2005–06: EuroLeague debut ====
Before the 2005–06 season, Neven Spahija became the head coach of the team. After losing their first two matches, Lietuvos rytas matched the EuroLeague record by winning seven consecutive EuroLeague fixtures, defeating as FC Barcelona, champions Maccabi Tel Aviv (twice) and Efes Pilsen Istanbul. Those wins allowed Rytas to advance to the Top 16 phase, where they won three times out of six, beating Tau Ceramica Vitoria once and Brose Baskets Bamberg twice. However, Lietuvos rytas was eliminated from that year's EuroLeague.

After winning the Baltic Basketball League title, Lietuvos rytas defeated Žalgiris Kaunas 4–0. Despite winning the Lithuanian title, Lietuvos rytas did not acquire the country's spot for 2006–07 EuroLeague that was reserved for Žalgiris Kaunas.

==== 2006–07: ULEB Cup finalists ====
Although the coach and three leading players Robertas Javtokas, Simas Jasaitis and Fred House had left the team during the interseason, the 2006–07 ULEB Cup season was rather successful for Lietuvos rytas. Two coaches were replaced during the season: Sharon Drucker from Israel was replaced by Slovenian Zmago Sagadin and the latter by his assistant coach Aleksandar Trifunović from Serbia. NBA player Kareem Rush arrived to lead the team to the ULEB Cup final where Real Madrid defeated Lietuvos rytas. However, Real Madrid's victory at the ACB semifinals, and of one of four spots reserved for Spain, allowed Lietuvos rytas to take part in the 2007–08 EuroLeague as the ULEB Cup finalist. On 27 April 2007, Lietuvos rytas won their second consecutive BBL title; Kareem Rush was named the Final Four MVP. The LKL finals and LKF Cup finals were both unsuccessful, though, as Žalgiris Kaunas won both tournaments.

==== 2007–08: Back to EuroLeague ====
Lietuvos rytas had a successful season during 2007–08 EuroLeague, defeating Unicaja Málaga and Armani Jeans Milano, and Maccabi Tel Aviv, the future EuroLeague finalist. Their 11–3 record was the team's best regular season performance ever, and the best by a Lithuanian team in Euroleague at the time. However, the team was not as successful in the Top 16 and with record of 2–4 did not advance to the playoffs. Lietuvos rytas were the runner-up in the Lithuanian Basketball League, the Baltic Basketball League and the Lithuanian Cup, losing each time to Žalgiris Kaunas.

=== Rimas Kurtinaitis era (2008–2010) ===
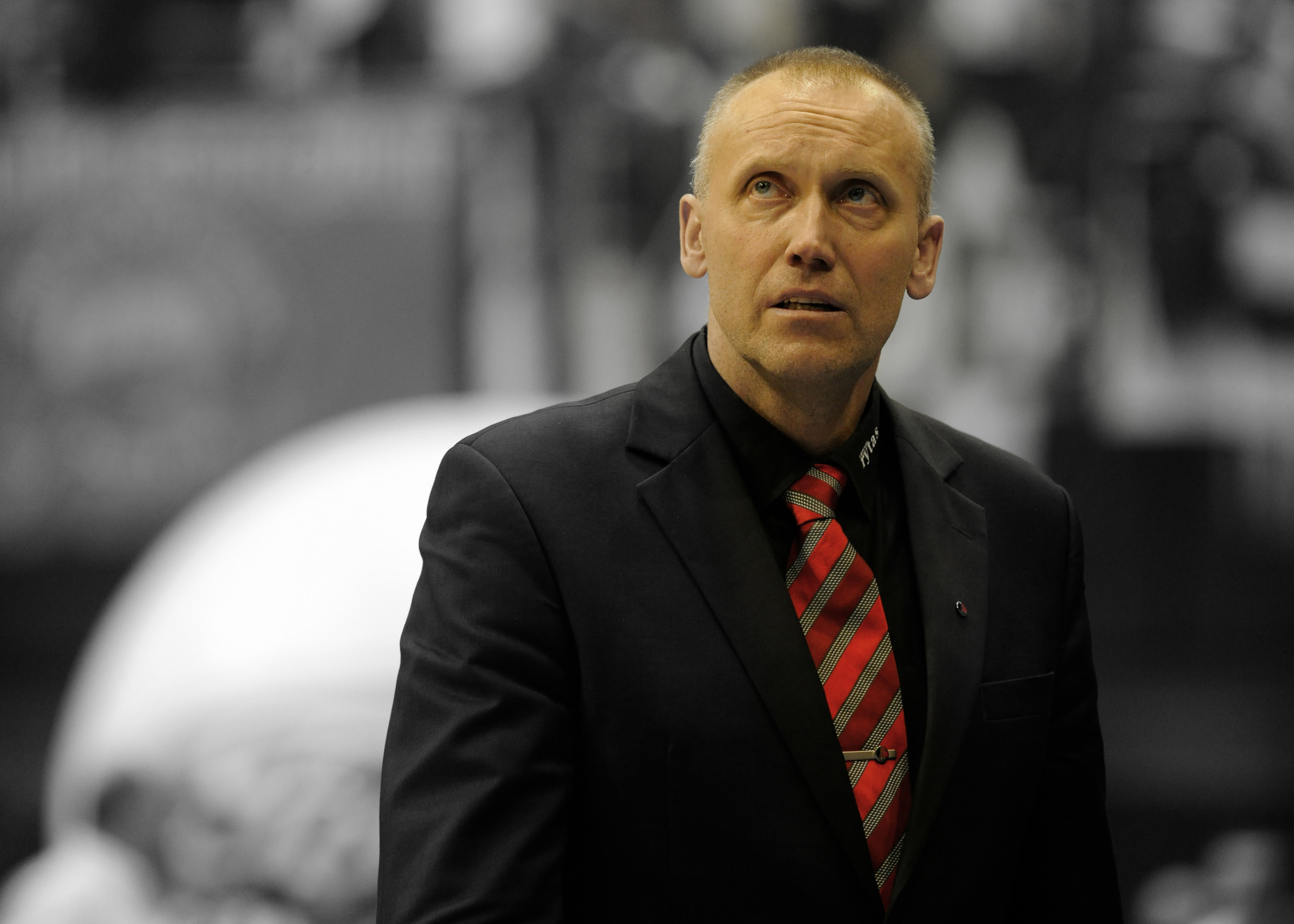
Rimas Kurtinaitis

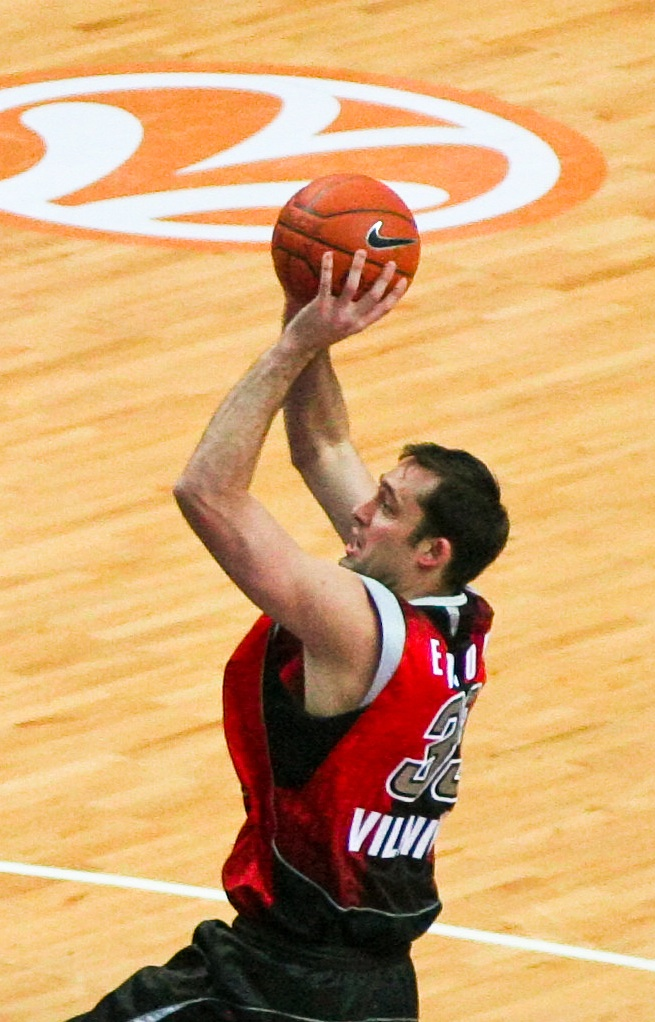
Chuck Eidson, the leader of the team for the 2008–09 season

During the 2008–09 season, Lietuvos rytas, affected by the 2008 financial crisis, had a significantly lower budget and put a greater emphasis on prospective local players. Lietuvos rytas won the first Baltic Basketball Presidents Cup during this season. On 21 October 2008, Lietuvos rytas lost against the NBA Golden State Warriors at Oracle Arena 126–106. Head coach Antanas Sireika resigned and was replaced by Rimas Kurtinaitis, a former Lietuvos rytas player, for the second half of the season. Rytas successfully advanced to the Final 8. Chuck Eidson was named the regular season MVP.

After victories against Benetton Treviso and Hemofarm Vršac, Rytas was considered an underdog against BC Khimki of Russia in the final. However, the performances of Steponas Babrauskas and Marijonas Petravičius led the team to victory. Rytas became the first team to reclaim the EuroCup title; Marijonas Petravičius was selected the Final 8 MVP. Lietuvos rytas was also successful in matches against arch rival Žalgiris Kaunas. It won the 2009 LKF Cup. Lietuvois rytas also won the Baltic Basketball League final game over Žalgiris Kaunas, 97–74. Chuck Eidson scored 41 points, and he was the MVP for the season. It was the third BBL title for the club. Lietuvos rytas also won the Lithuanian Basketball League (LKL) during this season as well, the fourth time Lietuvos rytas became the LKL champion.

After losing Petravičius, Lukauskis and Eidson, Lietuvos rytas also participated in the 2009 Gomelsky Cup. Lietuvos rytas was not as successful in the 2009–10 EuroLeague—they did not advance to the Top 16. Lietuvos rytas won the LKL trophy, beating Žalgiris Kaunas 4–3. It was the second consecutive LKL title for the Vilnius team. After the conclusion of the season, head coach Rimas Kurtinaitis left the club to be replaced by Dražen Anzulović.

=== Big dreams, small achievements (2010–2014) ===
==== 2010–11: Fourth season in the Euroleague ====
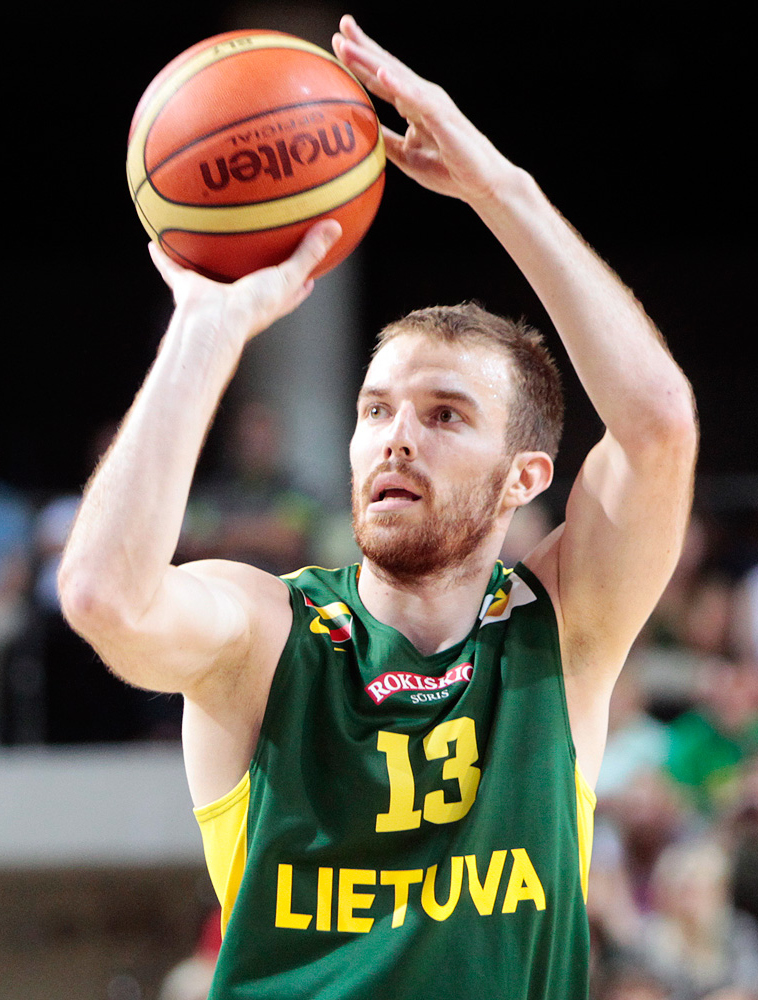
Martynas Gecevičius was the team leader for the 2010–11 season.

Rytas had huge expectations for the upcoming season. However, after a very poor pre-season and the start of the season, where Rytas lost nearly every game, and also losing in the BBL Cup to Tartu Rock, Dražen Anzulović was fired and replaced by the team's former coach Aleksandar Trifunović, just before the start of the 2010–11 EuroLeague season. Rytas started the EuroLeague with a 0–4 record, before shocking the basketball community by signing Šarūnas Jasikevičius to a contract. Rytas recovered, and went on to qualify for the EuroLeague Top-16 with a 4–6 record, including a win over defending champions Barcelona. Jasikevičius left Rytas in December, but Rytas signed the returning Simas Jasaitis just before the Top-16. Playing in the Group E in EuroLeague, Lietuvos rytas defeated Caja Laboral at Vitoria, Panathinaikos Athens in Athens and Unicaja Málaga at home — with a 3–2 record, Rytas faced Caja Laboral with a playoff spot in the EuroLeague on the line in Vilnius. Team leader Khalid El-Amin went out with an injury during the game — in front of a sellout crowd in the Siemens Arena, Caja Laboral finished off Rytas and qualified to the EuroLeague playoffs — Rytas losing out on the spot just by points differential to Caja Laboral — a heartbreaking end for Rytas.

Rytas lost the LKF Cup final to Žalgiris Kaunas. Rytas also debuted in the VTB United League during the season — finishing just a win away from the Final Four competition. In the Baltic Basketball League, however, Rytas shockingly lost in the semifinals at the Baltic Basketball League, to VEF Rīga and finished in third place for the first time in club history with a win over BK Ventspils. The loss resulted in head coach Trifunović being fired and replaced by assistant coach Darius Maskoliūnas — a long-time former Žalgiris player and coach. The team's game improved, but Rytas still lost the LKL finals to Žalgiris — Žalgiris won the LKL finals over Rytas 4–1.

==== 2011–12: EuroCup Final Four ====
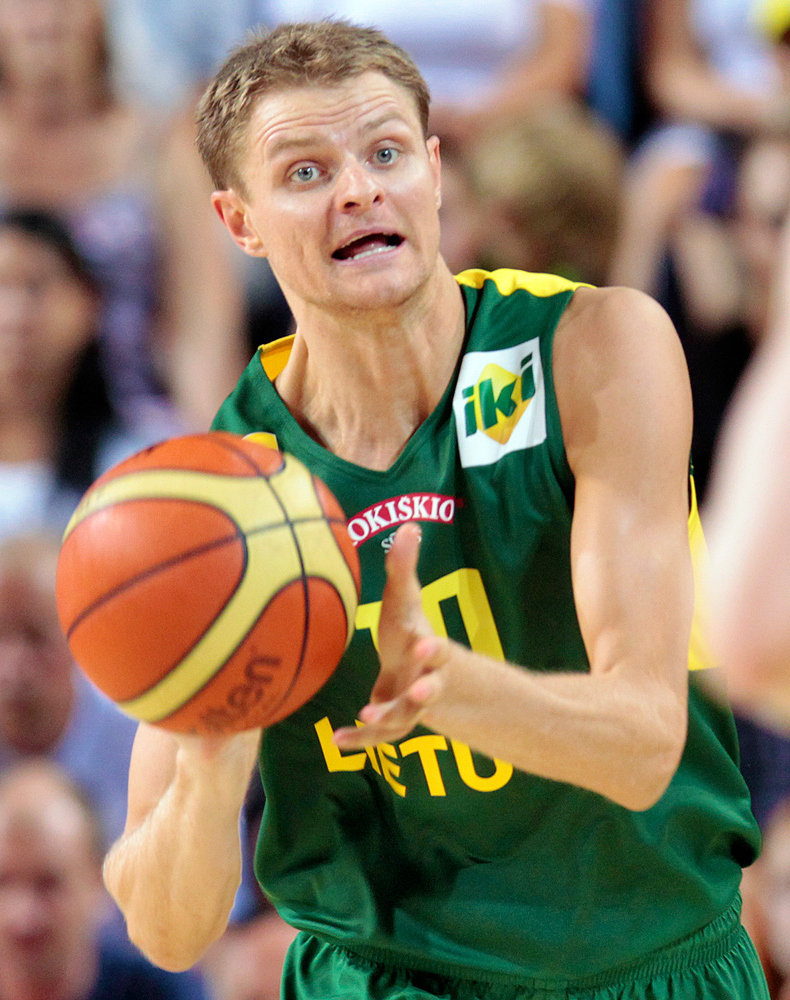
Renaldas Seibutis became the new team leader in the 2011–12 season.

After dismissing Milko Bjelica, Kenan Bajramović, D. J. Strawberry (replacement for the injured El-Amin), Cemal Nalga and losing team leader Martynas Gecevičius, Lietuvos rytas replaced eight players. In EuroLeague's qualification tournament, which was organized in Vilnius, Lietuvos rytas won their first two matches against Budućnost Podgorica and Cibona Zagreb, but lost the final game against Galatasaray. As a result, Lietuvos rytas had to play at the second-tier European competition, EuroCup. The team, led by Renaldas Seibutis, Jonas Valančiūnas and Tyrese Rice, lost to Valencia Basket 80–70 in the semifinals. Rytas finished third after a 71–62 win against Spartak St. Petersburg.

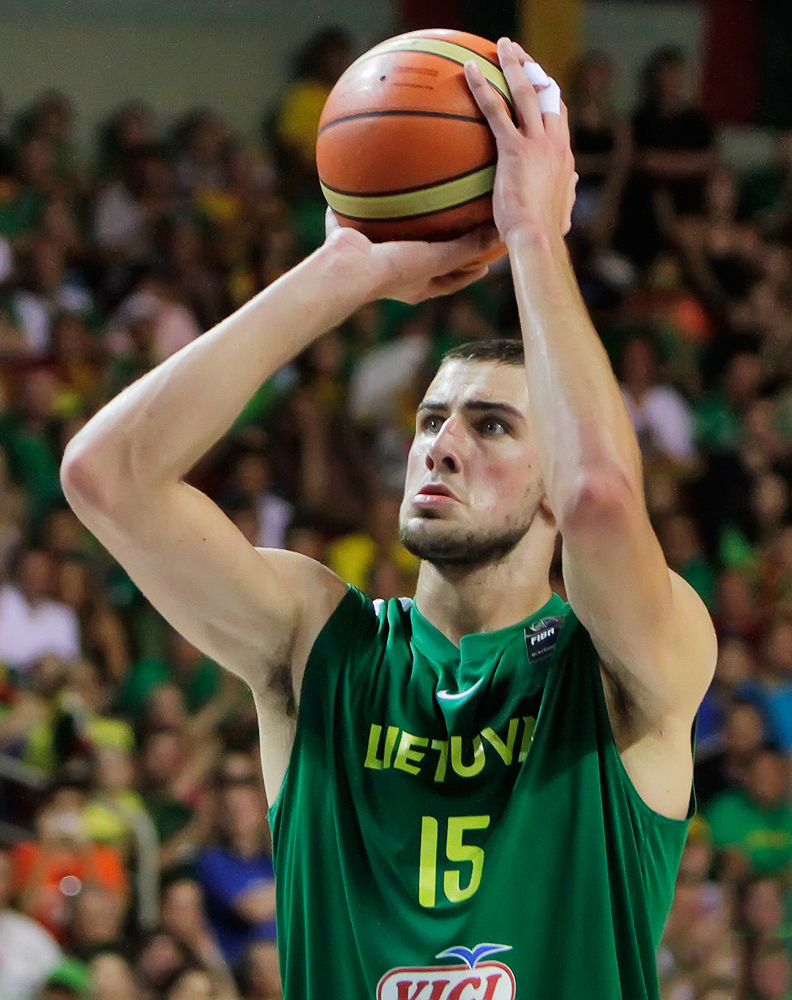
Jonas Valančiūnas spent his first seasons in Lietuvos rytas's system.

The team finished third in the regular season round of the VTB United League. They defeated Nizhny Novgorod and unexpectedly Khimki, the reigning EuroCup and VTB League champions, eventually finishing in third place. Despite two third places in international competitions, Rytas lost both the BBL finals, and the LKL final series to Žalgiris Kaunas, with Žalgiris winning the LKL finals 3–0. Following the conclusion of the season, Tyrese Rice, Lawrence Roberts, Aleksandar Rašić and Jonas Valančiūnas left the team.

==== 2012–13 ====
Players like Nemanja Nedović were expected to be the future of the team. However, the season was not very successful. Rytas lost the Lithuanian Supercup to Žalgiris, on aggregate, with Žalgiris winning 89–71 at home, and the rematch finishing with an 87–87 tie. After struggling in the opening months, Lietuvos rytas fired coach Aleksandar Džikić, promoting Darius Maskoliūnas as head coach. Though the game had improved, thanks to Leon Radošević, Renaldas Seibutis and Nemanja Nedović, the EuroLeague season was finished with a 2–8 record. The team did not fare much better in the VTB United League. After Leon Radošević and Predrag Samardžiski were released, Rytas signed Milt Palacio, Tomislav Zubčić and Patrick O'Bryant. The rookies were not much help, however, and Rytas still missed the VTB playoffs, with Donetsk defeating Rytas in the deciding game. Coach Maskoliūnas was fired and replaced by Dirk Bauermann. Rytas began to play much better, and in April scored an away win over Žalgiris Kaunas—the first in almost two years. Rytas made the LKL finals for the 15th time in a row. However, Žalgiris Kaunas easily swept Lietuvos Rytas 4–0 in the final.

==== 2013–14: Downfall of Lietuvos rytas ====
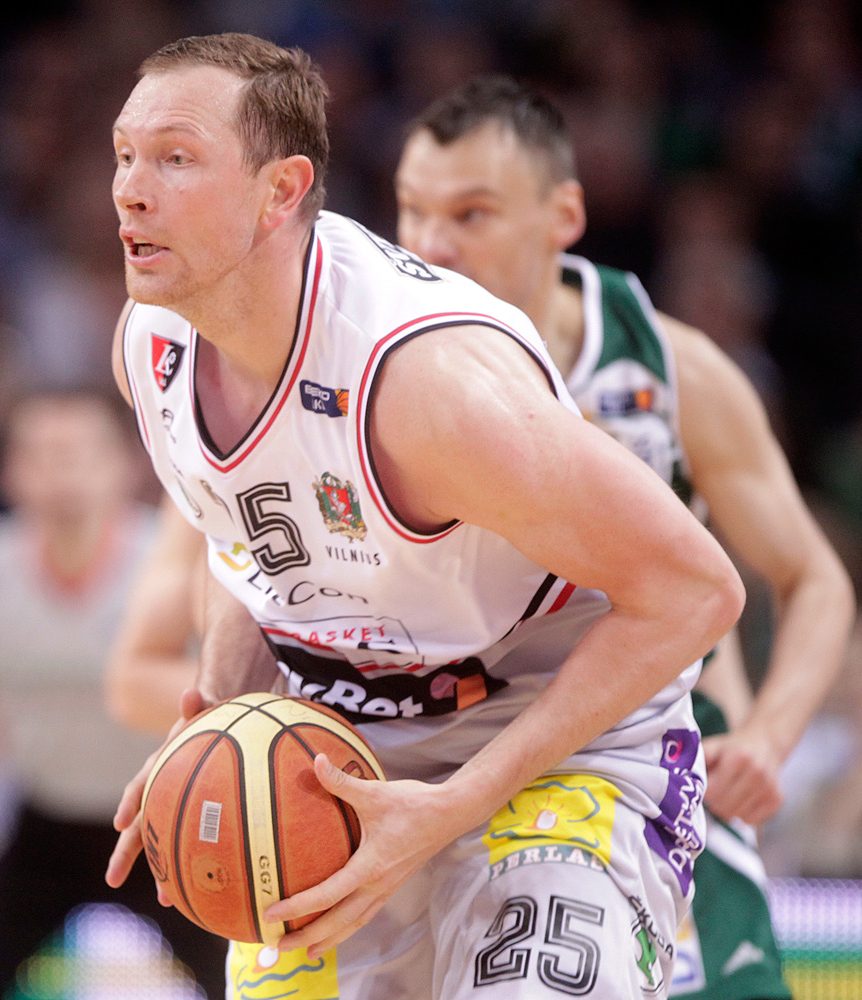
Rytas became the first club in Lithuania for veteran Darius Songaila.

Due to the unsuccessful past season, Rytas almost completely rebuilt the team: eight players left after the team lost the LKL finals to Žalgiris Kaunas. Former team leader Martynas Gecevičius was returned after two-season break, along with Rytas signing solid players like Milenko Tepić, Andreas Glyniadakis (both were released during the season for playing below expectations), Stevan Jelovac, Juan Palacios (who quickly became the team leader for Rytas), Zabian Dowdell, and also signing the LKL MVP of the 2012–2013 season, Gediminas Orelik, to a long-term contract. The biggest signings of the off-season became point guard Omar Cook — one of the most respected and best point guards of the EuroLeague alongside Darius Songaila. Seibutis, team leader, remained with the team. Lietuvos rytas had very high expectation for the season, and Rytas started successfully — Rytas dominated the 2013–14 Euroleague Qualifying rounds, held at Vilnius, with wins over VEF Rīga, EWE Baskets Oldenburg and Telenet Oostende and qualified for the EuroLeague.

In a group that also featured Maccabi Tel Aviv, Laboral Kutxa, Lokomotiv Kuban, Crvena Zvezda, Rytas started the EuroLeague season with a big win over multiple time champions Panathinaikos Athens. However, this would prove to be the peak of Rytas for the season, as Maccabi, Laboral Kutxa, Lokomotiv, Zvezda all beat Rytas, with even Panathinaikos winning the rematch in Athens — Rytas finished with a disastrous 1–9 record, and absolute last place in the EuroLeague. Coach Bauermann was fired with a 1–7 record and replaced, at first, by assistant Dainius Adomaitis, and then by Aleksandar Petrović on a full-time basis. Under Petrovič, and relegated from the EuroLeague, to the EuroCup, Rytas regained their form after their poor EuroLeague season. Rytas finished the EuroCup Last 32 phase with a 4–2 record — in a group with Beşiktaş Integral Forex, Cedevita Zagreb and CAI Zaragoza — qualifying for the EuroCup playoffs. In the EuroCup playoffs, Rytas faced, and was eliminated by Crvena zvezda Belgrade.

In the LKL, Rytas dominated. Antanas Kavaliauskas was signed on as the team's center before the end of the regular season — Rytas finished in first place in the regular season standings, while also beating rivals Žalgiris Kaunas in a series sweep — the win in Kaunas which resulted in Žalgiris finishing without any homecourt advantage for the semifinals. However, Rytas suffered even more heartbreak in the LKF Cup competition — considered heavy favorites, Rytas was beaten in what is considered the biggest upset in the Cup competition's history by TonyBet Prienai. The loss proved to be the end for coach Petrovič, who was fired by Rytas immediately after the finals, and replaced him by assistant coach Adomaitis.

In the LKL playoffs, Lietuvos rytas suffered the worst heartbreak, as for the first time since 1999, Rytas failed to qualify for the LKL finals; Rytas faced Žalgiris, and even with Rytas having homecourt advantage, Žalgiris won the series 2–1 — this is considered as the biggest fiasco in club history. Žalgiris went on to win the LKL championship. The disastrous season continued for Rytas in the VTB playoffs, where they lost to BC Nizhny Novgorod in the semifinals, losing a chance to play in the 2014–15 EuroLeague season — ending the season in a complete fiasco. Rytas won the bronze medals in the LKL and the VTB League. This was the team's worst season since 1998–99.

=== Tough years in EuroCup and LKL (2014–2017) ===
==== 2014–15: Return to EuroCup ====
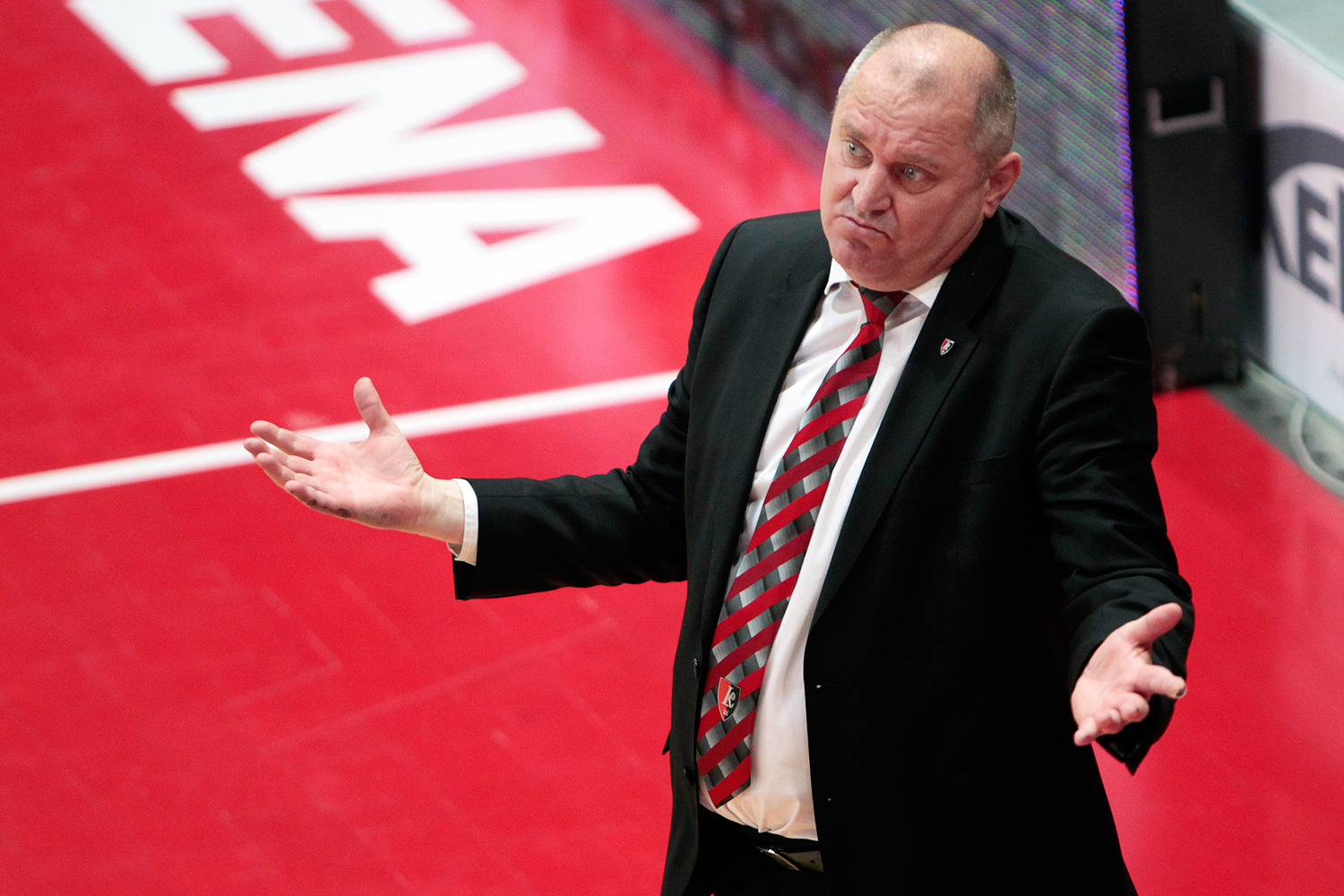
Virginijus Šeškus with Rytas

Seibutis, Palacios, Cook, Songaila, Jelovac, Dowdell, Bendžius all left Rytas, forcing Rytas to completely rebuild during the off-season. Also, the team played most of its games in the newly reconstructed Lietuvos rytas Arena instead of the Siemens Arena. Rytas also withdrew from the VTB League. Virginijus Šeškus, the architect of TonyBet Prienai and the win over Rytas in the LKF Cup, was signed as head coach. Under Šeškus, Rytas signed ex-Žalgiris player and Lithuanian national team member Adas Juškevičius, former NBA player and leader of BC Šiauliai Travis Leslie, his TonyBet stars, ex-Rytas player Mindaugas Lukauskis and center Artūras Valeika, and also signed Billy Baron and Mike Moser to complete the team. Gediminas Orelik became the new Rytas leader, along with Martynas Gecevičius and Antanas Kavaliauskas, who remained with Rytas during the summer.

Rytas finished the first 2014-15 EuroCup Basketball round with an 8–2 record and took first place in the group, which also featured Banvit, Krasny Oktyabr, Asesoft Ploiești, KK Partizan and Hapoel Jerusalem. In the Last 32 round, even with signings of Kšyštof Lavrinovič, Žygimantas Janavičius, and Simas Jasaitis, Rytas struggled — relegated EuroLeague side PGE Turów took first place in the group over Rytas, and Rytas split wins with Telenet Oostende and CB Sevilla — a home win over Telenet Oostende opening the way for Rytas to the EuroCup playoffs. Even the win was not enough for coach Šeškus, who was fired as head coach, and replaced by Marcelo Nicola. Rytas lost in first game of the EuroCup playoffs against Pınar Karşıyaka, tying 81–81 at home, but Karşıyaka dominating Rytas at home, 97–81.

In the 2015 LKF Cup, Rytas defeated Dzūkija Alytus and Šiauliai to reach the finals — Žalgiris defeated Rytas 82–76 in the finals.

In LKL, Rytas fought with Žalgiris for the first place in the regular season — a win by Žalgiris in the final game of the regular season secured the first place for Žalgiris with a one win advantage. In the LKL playoffs, Rytas defeated Šiauliai 3–0 in the quarterfinals, and then defeated EuroLeague side, and fellow EuroCup team Neptūnas Klaipėda 3–1 in the semifinals, in a tough series, qualifying for the LKL Finals after a one-year break. Žalgiris went on to beat Rytas 4–0 in the LKL finals. -

==== 2015–16 ====
"I don't know how they got this information, but they tried to lure me. <...> Vilnius. Family. Challenge. Beloved team. BC Lietuvos rytas had more levers at his side."

— Antanas Kavaliauskas, describing his "Loyalty..." message in Twitter, which he wrote after rejecting the identical contract from the LKL champions Žalgiris Kaunas that competed in the EuroLeague.

In addition to playing in the 2'500-seat arena, the club once again started playing more of their bigger games (including in the EuroCup and against Žalgiris) at the Siemens Arena, following an agreement with the arena which lasted until 2020. Billy Baron, Mike Moser, Travis Leslie, Martynas Gecevičius, Simas Jasaitis (who disappointed the previous season in a very forgettable final stint with Rytas) all left Rytas during the summer, while Marcelo Nicola remained as the head coach, also bringing with him point guard Nicolas Laprovittola — his European debut. Much of the previous season's roster (including leaders Orelik, Juškevičius and Lavrinovič) remained, with Antanas Kavaliauskas signing a new contract with Rytas, publicly rejecting an offer from rivals Žalgiris Kaunas. Rokas Giedraitis and Julius Jucikas were signed by Rytas from BC Šiauliai, where both were team leaders. Rytas also signed Neptūnas leader Deividas Gailius. The most shocking signing of the summer became the signing of Artūras Gudaitis, the talented center from Žalgiris, who signed with Rytas in a long-term deal.

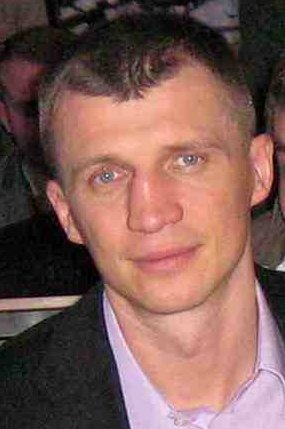
Under the command of the new coach Tomas Pačėsas, Rytas won first major trophy in six years.

Expectations for the 2015–16 EuroCup were high for Rytas — the group featured Zenit Saint Petersburg, Avtodor Saratov, PAOK, Beşiktaş and Szolnoki Olaj — Rytas was expected to not only qualify for the Last-32 stage, but also reach the playoffs. Instead, Rytas played the worst season in the EuroCup in club history — Zenit, Avtodor, PAOK all dominated against Rytas, with even lone wins over Beşiktaş and even the lowly Olaj were met with sound home defeats — Rytas played so poorly, that the attendance declined with each game. Rytas finished with an abysmal 2–8 record. Much of the previous season's leaders greatly underperformed, in contrast to the previous season.

Rytas fired Nicola, replacing him at first by assistant Aurimas Jasilionis, who also was replaced after a series of poor results by long-time assistant Arvydas Gronskis. Results only started improving when Tomas Pačėsas became the team's new head coach. Under Pačėsas, Rytas made a lot of questionable roster changes — Rytas released Laprovittola and signed point guards Denys Lukashov and Kendrick Brown, and also signing center Adam Łapeta and long-time Rytas player Artūras Jomantas from fellow LKL team BC Dzūkija. Rytas also made an unpopular decision to loan out Giedraitis and Jucikas to other LKL teams — essentially leaving Rytas as a team, led by veteran leadership. On 19–21 February, Rytas competed in the newly formed Karaliaus Mindaugo taurė tournament, held in Vilnius, which replaced the LKF Cup and was also organized by the LKL. After defeating Lietkabelis Panevėžys in the quarterfinals 88–82, Neptūnas Klaipėda in the semifinals 97–79, and Žalgiris Kaunas in the final 67–57, Rytas won their first trophy since 2010. The rest of the season, however, was a disaster. While the Pačėsas initiated roster changes were successful short-term, they backfired in the long run for Rytas. In the LKL regular season, Rytas finished behind rivals Žalgiris. Rytas defeated Lietkabelis Panevėžys in a tough quarterfinal 3–0 sweep. In the semifinals, Rytas faced Neptūnas in the LKL semifinals — while Rytas had been the better team in the regular season, Neptūnas had the better EuroCup campaign as Neptūnas reached the Last-32 stage. Neptūnas was also coached by former Rytas coach Dainius Adomaitis. Neptūnas beat Rytas 83–71 in Vilnius, and 70–68 in Klaipėda to take a 2–0 series lead — before Rytas made a comeback and tied the series 2–2 with 66-64 wins in Vilnius and 74–73 at Klaipėda. In the decider, Neptūnas shocked Rytas with a 73–72 win and a 3–2 series win. For the second time in three years, Rytas missed the LKL finals — which were won by Žalgiris. The disappointing season ended with the team winning the LKL bronze medal series 3–0 versus the Juventus Utena.

==== 2016–17: Departure of the old management ====
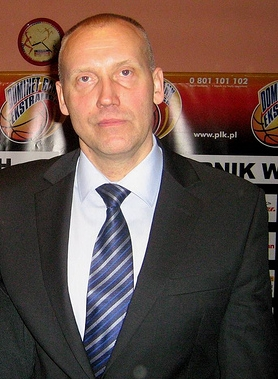
Rimas Kurtinaitis returned to BC Lietuvos rytas in 2017.

During the summer, team captain Kavaliauskas had a dispute with the team management concerning his pay, after which he signed with Žalgiris Kaunas. Rytas underwent massive roster changes during the summer — Orelik, Lukauskis, Janavičius, Lavrinovič, Juškevičius, Brown, Lukashov all departed. Coach Pačėsas remained with Rytas.

Lietuvos rytas qualified for the EuroCup Top 16 phase with a 3–5 record — home wins over Montakit Funelabrada, Bilbao Basket and one of the competition's favorites to win, Khimki — Rytas was led by summer signings David Logan and Drew Gordon in the EuroCup. During the EuroCup, Rytas struggled the point guard position — with uneventful stints for Rashaun Broadus, Josh Akognon and Corey Fisher, who remained with Rytas full time, later joined with Clevin Hannah. After failing to progress into the EuroCup Playoffs — Zenit Saint Petersburg held an advantage over Rytas and qualified over Rytas for the playoffs, the club announced addition of guard Jimmy Baron from local rivals Neptūnas Klaipėda — with Baron's arrival, Logan, Rytas leader, departed Rytas. On 10 February, Tomas Pačėsas stepped down and was replaced by Rimas Kurtinaitis, who had coached Rytas to most of its titles previously.

Under coach Kurtinaitis, Rytas shockingly lost to Juventus Utena in the quarterfinals of the King Mindaugas Cup, but Rytas finished in the LKL regular season behind Žalgiris Kaunas, who swept Lietuvos rytas during the season — Kavaliauskas was heavily jeered by Rytas fans whenever the teams met. Rytas defeated Pieno žvaigždės Pasvalys in the quarterfinals 3–0. Rytas faced Lietkabelis Panevėžys in the semifinals — Rytas beat Lietkabelis 96–85 in the first game at home, but Lietkabelis beat Rytas 90–73 at Panevėžys, 81–73 in Vilnius, and 86–77 in Panevėžys — to beat Rytas 3–1, in a big upset. Lietkabelis were also led by Lavrinovič, Lukauskis and Janavičius, who all played a big part in beating Rytas. This fiasco meant that Rytas did not qualify for the LKL finals for the second time in a row for the first time in the team's history. Žalgirs went on to win the LKL championship. Controversy arose as Rytas players Fisher, Hannah, Taylor Brown and Gordon were all suspended by the team for alleged partying during the series. In the bronze medal series against Neptūnas, Rytas and Neptūnas split home wins, before Rytas won their final game against Neptūnas 74–66 to take the bronze medal series 3–2, after clutch shots by ex-Neptūnas players Deividas Gailius and Jimmy Baron, ending the season with a more positive note and avenging their 2016 loss to Neptūnas. The massively disappointing season ended with an international scandal for the team, however, as club president Gedvydas Vainauskas made a controversial statement about black players on the team, drawing negative attention to the team from around the world.

=== New owners' era (2017–present) ===
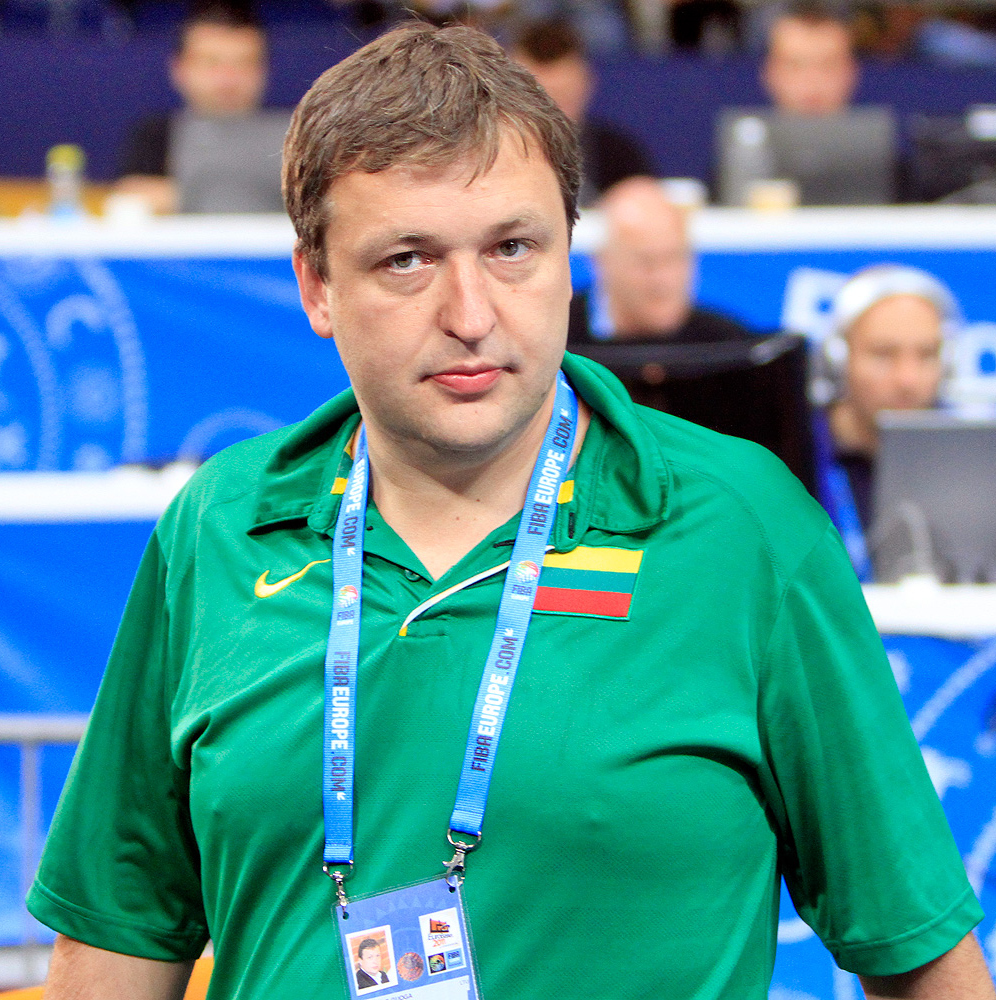
In 2017, Antanas Guoga bought a major stake in the club.

On 19 June 2017, famous poker player, businessman and European Parliament member Antanas Guoga bought fifty percent of the club from Sigitas Židonis and Remigijus Kazilionis. Two remaining stake owners Darius Gudelis and Vilnius City Municipality retained their rights to the club (twenty-five percent each). On 20 June Gedvydas Vainauskas resigned as president of Rytas a position he held since the founding of the club in 1997, just a week after receiving an award from LKL president Remigijus Milašius for his contributions to basketball.

Shortly after becoming the new owner of the club, Guoga sparked discussions about changing the club's name and invited the public to offer their ideas since the team no longer had connections with the Vainauskas' newspaper Lietuvos rytas. The idea was sharply criticised by the club's elite fans, group B Tribūna (Rytas Ultras), who said the only team they would support is black-white-red Rytas. On 21 June, the new owners organised a meeting, during which the first changes were announced. The public institution Krepšinio rytas was renamed to Statyba to honour the historical Statyba Vilnius, Darius Gudelis replaced Martynas Purlys as the club's director, and it was decided that the club's name Lietuvos rytas would be changed within a year with the most likely, but not yet final, choice being Rytas. Guoga also told the media it was very likely that at least two Lithuanian basketball stars will participate on the team, in addition to Jonas Valančiūnas, Linas Kleiza and Arvydas Macijauskas. On 4 July, Gudelis announced that former assistant coach Alberto Blanco and Linas Kleiza were joining the club. Their first task was to assist Rimas Kurtinaitis to bring together a new team roster.

On 13 July, a press conference was held during which it was announced that Kleiza had also become a shareholder of the club buying part of the Guoga's stake. He was named vice-president of the club and would act as sports director. Limited liability company Norvelita and Perlas also became shareholders of the club.

Despite positive changes in the club, rifts between the new owners started to emerge after it announced a sponsorship agreement with Lithuanian business consortium MG Baltic. Club president Antanas Guoga condemned the partnership and demanded an annulment of it and the resignation of CEO Darius Gudelis. Despite his wishes the other shareholders decided against these actions and openly questioned Guoga's financial commitment to the club. Finally on 24 October, the club announced that Guoga had sold his share in the club to Gudelis and had written off €300,000 that he had previously loaned the club. On 9 October 2018, however, it was revealed Guoga was still the team's president. Gudelis resigned on 15 November, after a controversy involving Blanco. Executive director Julius Serapinas was named as his replacement. On 7 June 2019, Serapinas was replaced by former Rytas player Rolandas Jarutis. Kleiza left the team in February 2020, after a falling out with Jarutis.

==== 2017–18: Comeback ====
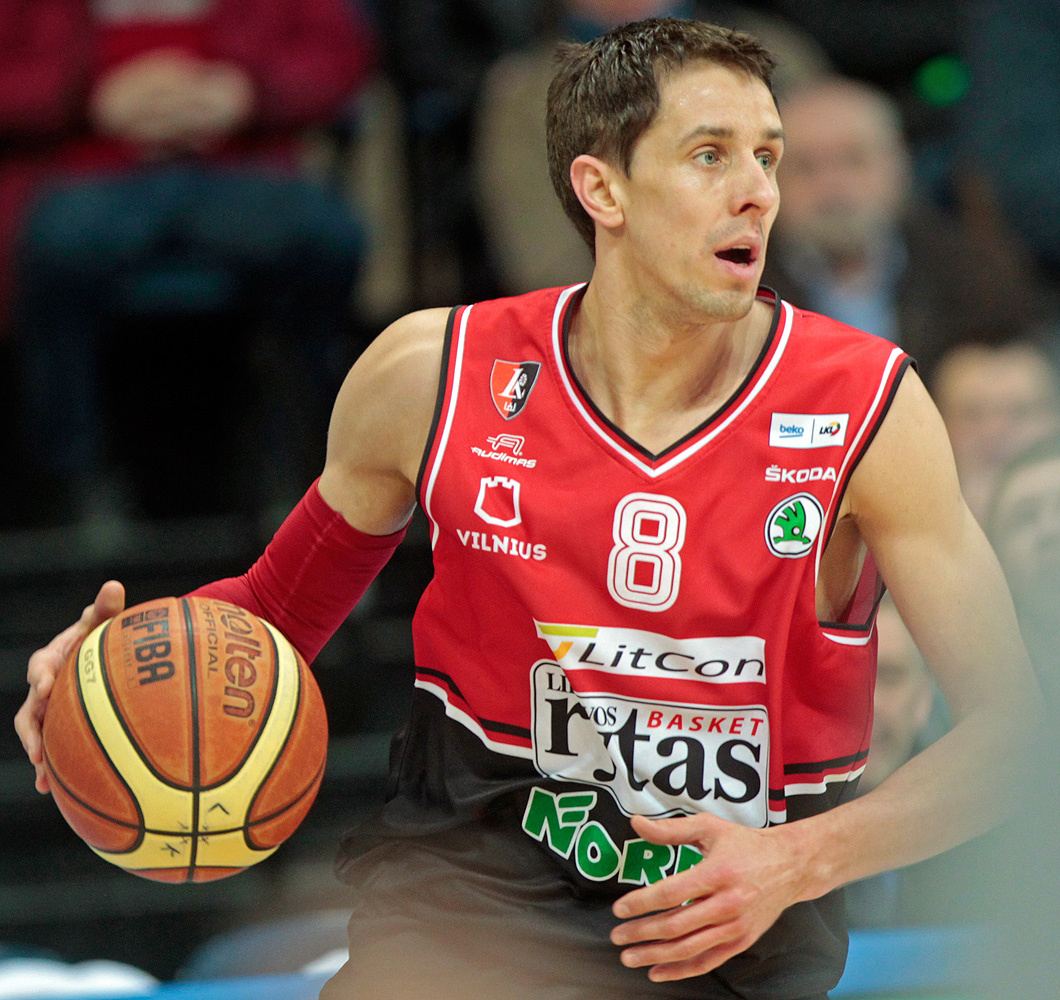
BC Lietuvos rytas symbol Mindaugas Lukauskis returned to the team for his ninth season and helped his long-time team return to the Lithuanian League finals. He was the league's oldest player.

On 14 June 2017, it was announced that Rytas had received a wild card to the 2017–18 EuroCup season. On 17 June, Rytas signed with first addition to the club for the upcoming season, former Lietkabelis leader Ben Madgen. Rimas Kurtinaitis remained as head coach. On 11 July, famous Lithuanian masseur Juozas Petkevičius returned to the team. After launching ticket sales for the upcoming season, the team has sold 1,800 season tickets in less than 24 hours. On 19 July, Rytas signed veteran Mindaugas Lukauskis for his ninth season as a club member. On the following day, Travis Peterson was signed and Kurtinaitis also confirmed that the team had reached an agreement with Chris Kramer. On 22 July, Chris Kramer and Marc Antonio Carter officially joined the team. On 28 July, Mindaugas Brazys joined the coaching staff. On 17 August, notable Lithuanian youth national team member Martynas Echodas was signed to a three-year deal. Robert Carter also signed with Rytas on August 1. Only Giedraitis, Jimmy Baron and Deividas Sirvydis, a Rytas youth team member who made his debut during the bronze medal series, remained with Rytas.

The newly formed team showed positive results during the preparation games, winning all seven games and the Vladas Garastas Cup.

On 23 September, Rytas began the 2017–18 LKL season by defeating Juventus Utena 82–75. On 25 September, Rytas signed experienced veteran Loukas Mavrokefalidis. Artūras Gudaitis was bought out by Euroleague side EA7 Emporio Armani, and he was replaced by Egidijus Mockevičius, who signed a three-year deal with the team on 30 September. However, Mockevičius was unable to play due to injury, returning at the start of the new year. In the LKL regular season, Rytas played its best season since 2015.

The rivlaries with Netūnas Klaipėda and Lietkabelis Panevėžys intensified, in part thanks to Rytas having signed former Neptūnas leader Jimmy Baron the previous season, and Ben Madgen, former Lietkabelis leader, during the summer. With Neptūnas, the rivalry became even more intense with the signings of Neptūnas leaders Arnas Butkevičius and Mindaugas Girdžiūnas, who replaced the Carters, during the season — both players became intensely hated in Klaipėda, along with Rytas. Rytas finished behind Žalgiris in the LKL regular season standings, but this time, Rytas split wins with Žalgiris.

In the LKL playoffs, Rytas defeated Juventus Utena 3–0 in the quarterfinals. In the LKL semifinals, Rytas faced off against Neptūnas — a very intense, very tough and very personal series. Neptūnas shocked Rytas in the opener in Vilnius, 84–79, before Rytas beat Neptūnas in Klaipėda, 67–49, and 74–67 in Vilnius. Neptūnas had tied the series with a 74–70 home win. In the decider, Rytas beat Neptūnas in a hard thought 88–82 win to win the series 3–2. The win marked the first trip to the LKL finals since 2015. In the LKL finals, Rytas faced Žalgiris Kaunas, playing the best season since 1999 and coming off a third-place finish in the Euroleague. Žalgiris beat Rytas 96–83 in Kaunas in the opener. At home, Rytas avenged the loss with an 82–73 win to tie the series 1-1. However, this would prove to be all Rytas could give to Žalgiris — Žalgiris finished off the series with a 90–80 win in Kaunas, 82–78 win in Vilnius and 80–70 win in Kaunas — winning the series 4–1. The LKL playoffs were not without controversy for Rytas — rumors of Dainius Adomaitis, former Rytas coach and the Lithuanian men's national team head coach — started circling as Rytas had negotiations with Adomaitis about taking over the head coaching job held by Kurtinaitis, with the rumors actually starting during the semifinals and intensifying during the finals — rumors that indeed turned out to be true as Kurtinaitis left Rytas after the season.

In the 2018 Karaliaus Mindaugo taurė, Rytas avenged their previous season defeat against Juventus Utena, winning in overtime 91–88 in the quarterfinals. In the semifinals, held in Klaipėda, where Rytas was now intensely hated, Rytas defeated Dzūkija Alytus (who had beat hosts Neptūnas in the quarterfinals) 81–61. In the finals, Rytas faced Žalgiris, and heavily cheered by the crowd in Klaipėda, Žalgiris dominated and beat Rytas 81–62 in the finals.

In the 2017–18 EuroCup Basketball season, Rytas, in a group with Bilbao Basket, KK Partizan, Lokomotiv Kuban, Alba Berlin and Limoges CSP, led by Mavrokefalidis, Kramer, Rokas Giedraitis, having his best year, also by Echodas getting some strong performances, finished the regular season with a 6–4 record, and second place in group C. In the Top 16, however, in a group with B.C. Zenit Saint Petersburg, Bayern Munich and Fiat Torino, Rytas only managed a lone win over Fiat Torino at home — Rytas finished with a 1–5 record. Coach Kurtinaitis and the team were heavily criticized for the team's poor defense.

The Rytas youth team, led by Deividas Sirvydis and Marek Blaževič, who already started playing for Rytas in the LKL, won the 2017–18 Euroleague Basketball Next Generation Tournament — Sirvydis was named the MVP of the tournament.

==== 2018–19: King Mindaugas Cup winners and return to the EuroCup playoffs ====
"I want to underline that this team is special. I began professionally playing basketball when I was seventeen, I have won the Croatian championship and cup twice. I played in the Italian final, however this team is something different. I have to begin from the coach – he gives us directions, but you need to have 12 soldiers, pit bulls who would follow these. These guys are special and deserve the victory."

— Rok Stipčević, following the Rytas triumph in the 2019 Karaliaus Mindaugo taurė Final Four.

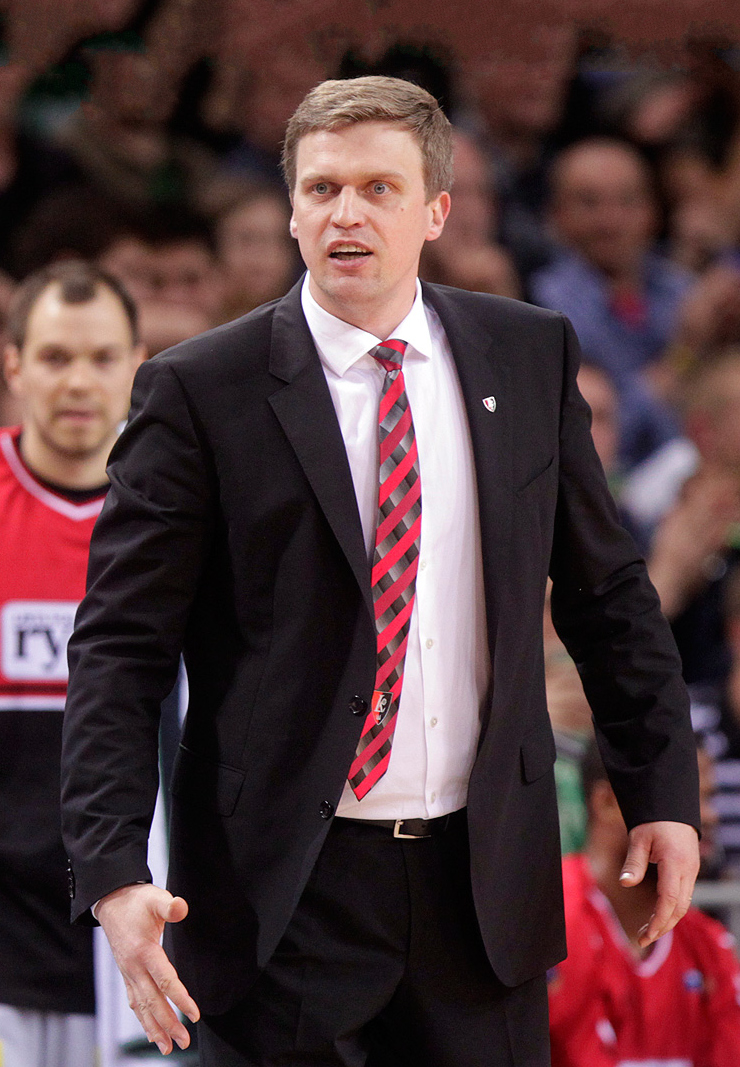
Lithuania men's national basketball team head coach Dainius Adomaitis returned to Rytas in 2018.

The preparation for the season began in June, during the semifinal series, with controversial rumors that Lithuanian national basketball team, and former Rytas head coach Dainius Adomaitis would replace coach Kurtinaitis at the end of the season. While the team denied the rumors, after losing the LKL finals to Žalgiris Kaunas, Adomaitis was named the team's new head coach. Former Rytas players, and current members of the national team, Eimantas Bendžius and Evaldas Kairys, were the first additions, signing in July. Dominique Sutton, formerly of Dolomiti Energia Trento, and one of the best players in both the Italian league and the Eurocup, signed in August. D. J. Seeley replaced Rokas Giedraitis, who left to sign with Alba Berlin. Rytas also signed point guard Matt Farrell, scoring leader from the University of Notre Dame, but he was released just before the season for reported personal reasons. Talented youth team members Deividas Sirvydis and Marek Blaževič were signed to new long-term deals. Norbertas Giga, former member of the Rytas system, returned in October. Kramer, who resigned in the summer, was named the new team captain.

Rytas won the first game of the season, beating Juventus Utena, 87–57, in the start of the LKL.

In the 2018–19 EuroCup Basketball season, Rytas played in group D, and struggled against top teams in the group, such as Unicaja Malaga, UNICS Kazan and Fraport Skyliners, but wins over KK Mornar and Fiat Torino helped Rytas qualify for the Top 16 stage with a 5–5 record. Seeley, Sutton (who was released in February) and Bendžius were the team leaders. Martynas Echodas was named the EuroCup Basketball Rising Star, while Sirvydis also earning increased minutes. In the Top 16 stage, now joined by Stipčević and Artsiom Parakhouski, Rytas struggled against Alba Berlin, which was led by former Rytas player Rokas Giedraitis, but wins over KK Partizan and AS Monaco helped them qualify for the EuroCup playoffs for the first time since 2015. Rytas faced Valencia Basket — Valencia beat Rytas 75-64 and 71–56 to win the series 2–0, eliminating Rytas from the EuroCup.

During the 2018–19 season, Rytas won the King Mindaugas Cup. After eliminating Juventus Utena in the Quarterfinals, they eliminated Neptūnas Klaipėda in the semifinals 86–72 and then defeated Žalgiris Kaunas in the Final 70–67. After a season-ending injury to Kramer, Rytas signed Derek Needham to fill the point guard spot.

During the season in the LKL, Rytas struggled against rivals Žalgiris, Lietkabelis and Neptūnas, which led to Rytas finishing third in the regular season with a 26–10 record, one of the worst finishes in club history. Rytas faced Juventus in the quarterfinals, winning the series in 2–1. In the semifinals, Rytas faced Neptūnas who, for the first time, had home court advantage, defeating them shockingly easily 2–0 and advancing to the LKL Finals. In the LKL Finals, Žalgiris easily swept Rytas 3–0.

==== 2019–20: Final season in the EuroCup ====
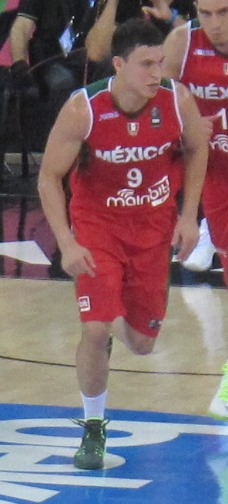
Francisco Cruz and Eimantas Bendžius were leaders of Rytas during the 2019–20 season

During the off-season, Parakhouski, Seeley, Needham, Kramer, Stipčević, Giga, Normantas, Piliauskas all departed from the team. Rolandas Jarutis, former Rytas player, was named the new team manager. Under Jarutis, Rytas started adding more players from developmental team Perlas-MRU, like Augustas Marčiulionis, son of legendary basketball player Šarūnas Marčiulionis, Simas Jarumbauskas, Einaras Tubutis, Ąžuolas Tubelis (who started earning minutes as the season progressed) and Marek Blaževič, who already had played in the previous seasons, but also played in the NKL for Perlas. Karolis Giedraitis, son of former Rytas player Andrius Giedraitis, also earned a spot on the team. Deividas Sirvydis, drafted in the 2019 NBA draft by the Dallas Mavericks as the 37th pick, but traded to the Detroit Pistons, remained with the team. Bendžius, Girdžiūnas and most importantly, the improving Butkevičius remained with the team. Butkevičius also debuted for the Lithuanian national basketball team in the World Cup. Rytas also signed Dovis Bičkauskis from Juventus and Tu Holloway as the new point guards. Australian Cameron Bairstow was signed as the new power forward, while Francisco Cruz was signed as the new shooting guard. Evaldas Kairys was initially among the players released during the summer, but was re-signed in September. After the season, coach Adomaitis remained with Rytas.

The preparation for the season began in August. Rytas largely struggled in pre-season matches. Rytas started the 2019–20 LKL season with a five-game winning streak. The win streak was snapped by Žalgiris Kaunas. Due to the COVID-19 pandemic, the LKL season ended prematurely — Žalgiris were announced as the winners, while Rytas finished second — one win over third-placed Lietkabelis Panevėžys. In the King Mindaugas Cup tournament, Rytas reached the finals, but was defeated by Žalgiris.

In the 2019–20 EuroCup Basketball season, Rytas played in Group B, with Umana Reyer Venezia, Partizan NIS, Tofaş, Lokomotiv Kuban and Limoges CSP. Wins over Lokomotiv Kuban and Tofaş helped Rytas qualify for the Top 16, with a 4–6 record, also eliminating the powerful Lokomotiv team, from the competition. Bendžius, Butkevičius and Cruz lead the team, while Sirvydis and Marek Blaževič continued to earn more minutes and improving their play, becoming solid contributions for Rytas. In the Top 16 competition, Rytas played UNICS Kazan, AS Monaco and Galatasaray. Losses against AS Monaco and UNICS eliminated Rytas from playoff contention. Rytas finished with a 3–3 record, and third place in the standings. The season was later cancelled. During the season, Rytas gave much of the younger players playing time, with Blaževič in particular having a breakout season with Rytas, both in the LKL and the EuroCup.

==== 2020–21: Return to FIBA competitions ====
Rytas faced with the 2020–21 season with drastically reduced budget as the club had to pay off debts, despite the fact that the debt from June 2017 decreased from 4,040,000 Eur to 2,140,000 Eur, and fired team manager Jarutis. Therefore, the club decided to choose the Basketball Champions League instead of the EuroCup due to a much more beneficial financial offer and returned to a FIBA competition for the first time since the 2002–03 season. Rytas sold its young talents Deividas Sirvydis — to Hapoel Jerusalem and Marek Blaževič for buyouts, with Marek in particular being a painful departure, as he left Rytas for Žalgiris. Captain Eimantas Bendžius left the club due to financial reasons, however Martynas Echodas and the new captain Arnas Butkevičius stayed in the team. Donaldas Kairys replaced Dainius Adomaitis in the head coach position. Also, Rytas signed with a former EuroLeague star Andrew Goudelock, Demetrius Jackson, who proved to be a pleasant surprise, Chris McCullough, and Lithuanians Saulius Kulvietis, Rokas Gustys, Gytis Radzevičius, Lukas Uleckas, Augustas Marčiulionis. Due to health reasons, contract with Kulvietis was terminated and he was replaced by Kristjan Kitsing; Maurice Ndour was also signed in October.

The season initially started strong for Rytas — at the start of the LKL, Rytas smashed BC Juventus in the opener 106–77, and went on a six-game win streak, thanks to great play from Goudelock and point guard Jackson. The win streak was stopped by Žalgiris Kaunas, who beat Rytas in Vilnius. Problems arose within Rytas, starting with Jackson shockingly leaving Rytas just days after their 2020–21 Basketball Champions League debut for personal reasons. McCullough had a number of off-court issues, ending with Rytas releasing him in November. Injuries, losses, reported and rumored conflicts between coach Kairys and Rytas players, poor player selection, with Ryan Boatright, replacing Jackson, and center Keith Benson becoming huge failures for Rytas, and by January, Rytas had completely fallen apart — Rytas ended their Champions League campaign after the group stage with a 2–4 record — a huge disappointment for the team. The problems continued — Ndour, one of the few bright spots for Rytas for the season, left Rytas after the exit in the Champions League. Rytas also suffered multiple upset losses in the LKL and in the King Mindaugas Cup, suffered the biggest fiasco of the season, losing to Juventus in the quarter-finals, including an embarrassing 27 point defeat at home. The loss proved to be the final game for coach Kairys, as he was fired immediately after the game, and was replaced by his assistant Giedrius Žibėnas. Rytas also made a few more changes to the roster, releasing Boatright and Benson soon after the firing of Kairys, and signing Ivan Buva as the new center. The changes also helped the talented Augustas Marčiulionis and Dovis Bičkauskis get more playing time.

To the surprise of everyone, under Žibėnas, Rytas made a comeback, winning their next 16 out of 17 games in the LKL, including an away win over Žalgiris in Kaunas — their first win over Žalgiris since February 2019, thanks to a game by Ivan Buva, and rose up the standings in the LKL by the end of the regular season, finishing in second place after Žalgiris. In the LKL playoffs, Rytas swept both BC Šiauliai and Eurocup team Lietkabelis Panevėžys to make the LKL finals. In the finals, Žalgiris swept Rytas 3–0. Many Rytas fans nonetheless largely considered the end of the season a success. After the season, coach Žibėnas signed an extension with the club to continue as head coach for the following season, for his great efforts in bringing Rytas back during the season.

==== 2021–22: LKL champions ====
Rytas Vilnius celebrating after becoming the 2022 Lithuanian Basketball League Champions

During the off-season, much of the roster departed the team. Rytas signed players like the returning Margiris Normantas, Vaidas Kariniauskas, Jarvis Williams, Kenneth Smith and Tanner Leissner to strengthen the roster, while also keeping players like Buva, Butkevičius, Uleckas and Radzevičius, all among leaders of the previous season with the team. Coach Žibėnas remained as head coach of Rytas.

While Rytas initially had struggles, soon enough, Rytas started showing some potential. Injuries to Williams and Leissner lead to the brief return of Maurice Ndour. Rytas had a long win streak in both the LKL, and the Basketball Champions League. In the Champions League, Rytas finished 1st in the regular season, in a group that included EWE Baskets Oldenburg, Beşiktaş Icrypex and defending two-time champions of the tournament Hereda San Pablo Burgos, with Rytas getting memorable wins over Burgos both away, and at home, and finishing with a 4–2 record. In the LKL, Rytas had overtaken Žalgiris Kaunas in the standings, leading for much of the season. High hopes, nonetheless, once again hit some road blocks by January–March — the win streak ended with a close home loss to Žalgiris, who took first place in the LKL regular season, and Rytas struggled in the Champions League Round of 16 stage, falling behind Lenovo Tenerife, and SIG Strasbourg, finishing just out of the playoffs due to a point difference with SIG Strasbourg.

In the King Mindaugas Cup, held in Vilnius, Rytas was believed to be a favorite heading in — however, a shock loss to Lietkabelis Panevėžys in the semifinals left Rytas without the finals for the second consecutive season. Rytas won the bronze medal game against BC Šiauliai, also in a struggle. Žalgiris went on to win the tournament. During this time, Ndour once again left Rytas, and he was eventually replaced by former Rytas player Evaldas Kairys, who returned to the team.

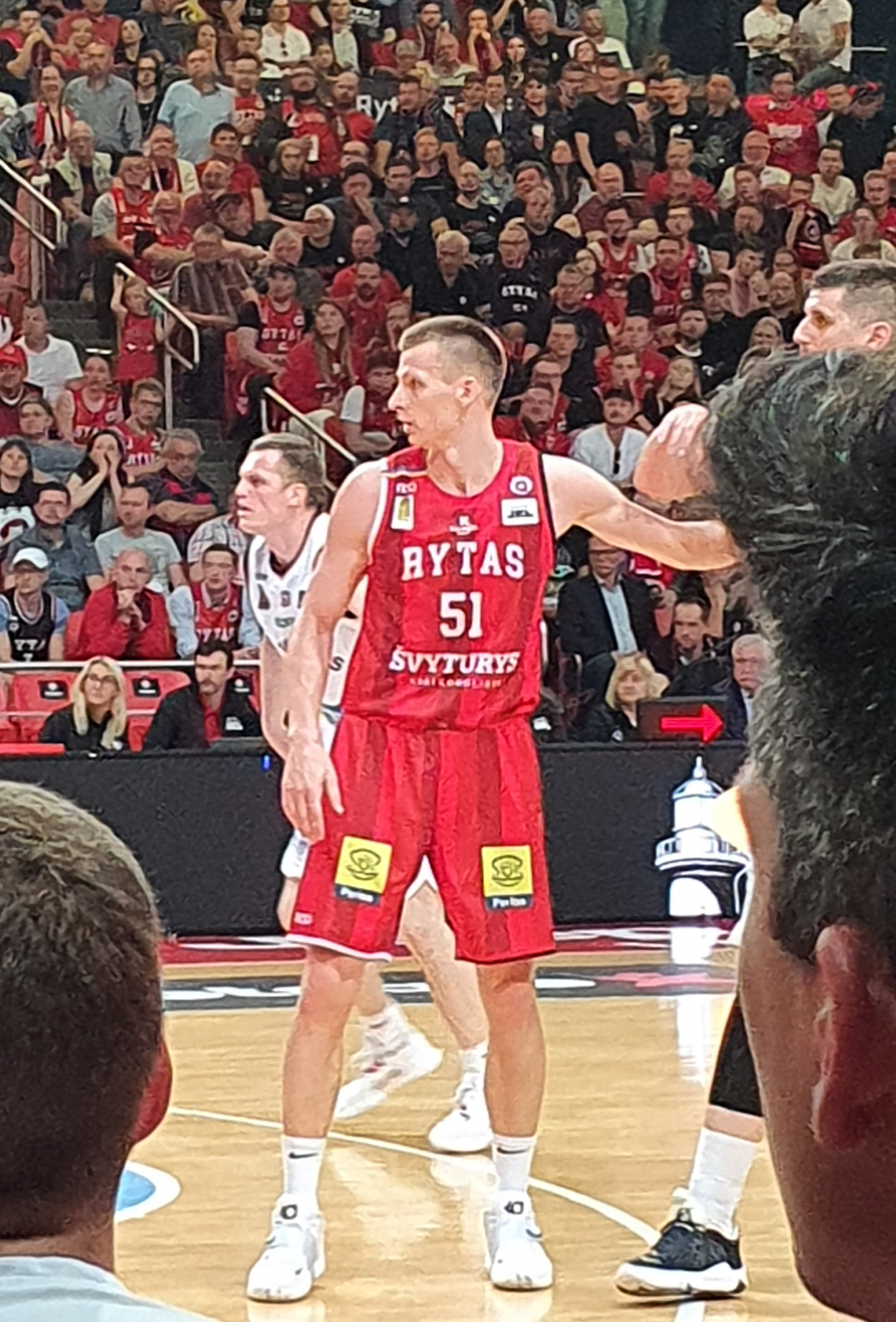
Arnas Butkevičius, captain of the team, during the 2022 LKL Finals

With the LKL remaining, by April, Rytas had once again found their game. Led by LKL MVP Buva, Rytas once again regained the LKL regular season leading position, by beating Žalgiris, and for the first time since 2013–14, Rytas finished in first place in the LKL standings and earned homecourt advantage for the playoffs. Great play by the improving Radzevičius, Uleckas, captain Butkevičius, Smith and the returning Jarvis Williams became the key for success. Players like Margiris Normantas were also praised for their efforts.

"I wanted this year's chebra (squad) to end the season victoriously. Getting over each other's heads benefits the team. Most importantly, it wouldn't have been useful if at the end of the season we hadn't realized that eventually we need to give in to something, accept our role, so that everyone is useful for the team and not for themselves. When we realized this, we became very strong. Of course, we didn't avoid mistakes, we didn't avoid bad decisions, but then we became a real team."

— Arnas Butkevičius.

In the LKL playoffs, Rytas had struggles — in the quarterfinals, Rytas defeated BC Dzūkija 3–1 in the quarterfinals, and BC Šiauliai 3–1 in the semifinals. Rytas would struggle early, but by the deciding games, would win in dominating fashion.

In the LKL finals, Rytas would face a surprising opponent in Lietkabelis Panevėžys, who had eliminated the defending champions Žalgiris in the semifinals — Žalgiris had won the previous 11 consecutive LKL championships, and had been the most hated team among Rytas fans. While not getting a chance for revenge against Žalgiris for all the years of loses, Rytas had become the favorite of the LKL finals for the first time in a very long time. In the LKL finals start, however, Rytas lost to Lietkabelis 77–68 at home, losing their homecourt advantage. Rytas, having to respond, responded in dominating fashion by winning the next two games 88–66 in Panevėžys, and 85–63 in Vilnius, in a very controversial game which included Lietkabelis head coach Nenand Čanak shoving Rytas head coach Žibėnas and even getting into an argument with Rytas director Darius Gudelis. In a much hyped game in Panevėžys, facing a deficit, Rytas managed to pull a win over Lietkabelis 78–77, on a dunk in the deciding seconds from Butkevičius, and took a 3–1 lead in the LKL finals. On June 7, 2022, Rytas had finally prevailed — beating Lietkabelis 79–76, Rytas won the series 4–1. For the first time since 2010, Rytas had regained the LKL championship.

==== 2022–23 ====
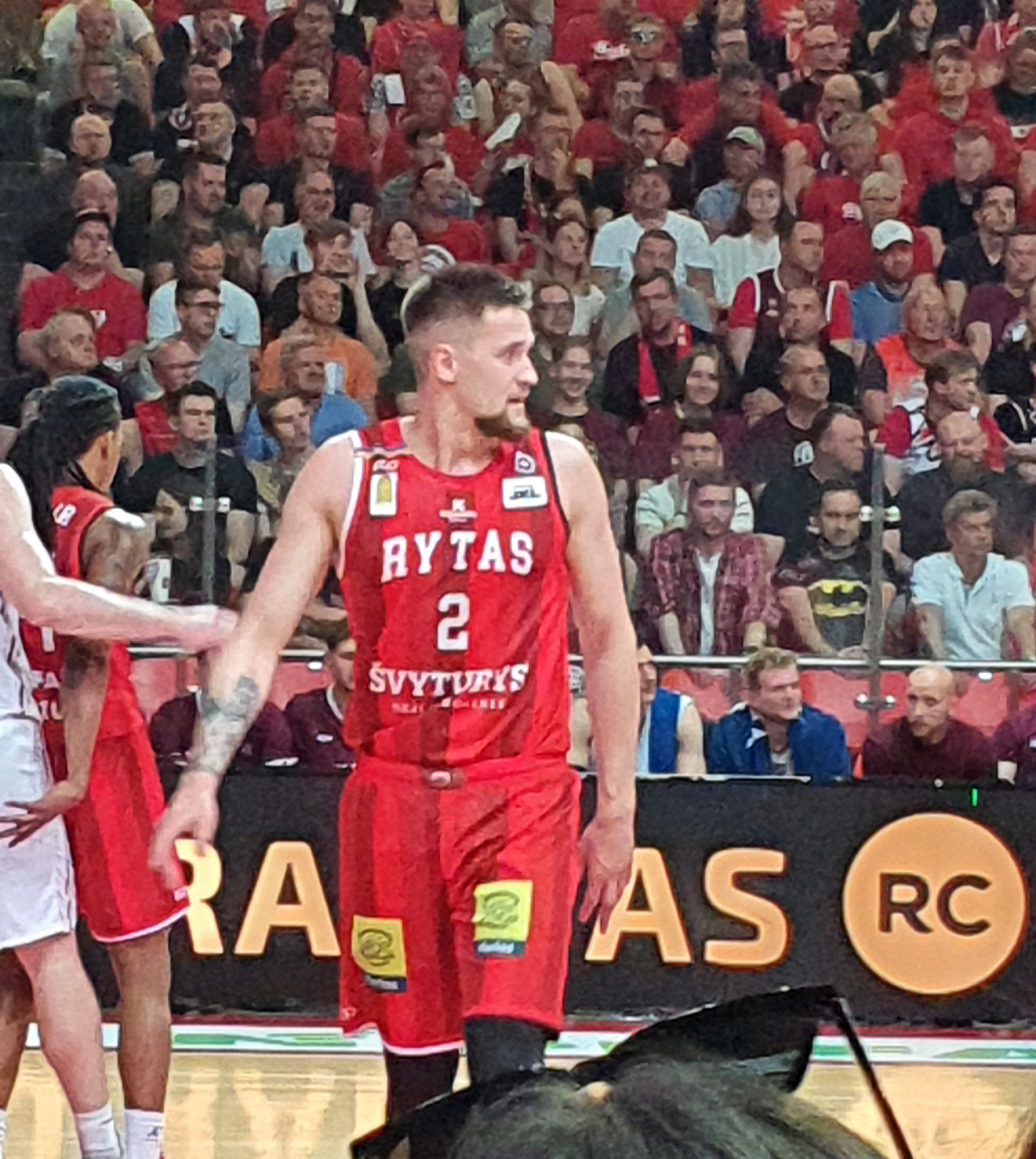
Following the departure of Butkevičius, Margiris Normantas was selected captain of the team in 2022

Over the summer, much of the LKL championship winning team departed. Buva, Smith, Leissner, Girdžiūnas, Kariniauskas all departed. The most painful of the departures, was captain Arnas Butkevičius signing with hated rivals Žalgiris Kaunas. Rytas first signed the returning Martynas Echodas to replace the departing Ivan Buva. Rytas signed former Žalgiris player Gytis Masiulis to replace Leissner, while Todd Withers was signed to replace Butkevičius. Benedek Váradi and former LKL MVP with BC Šiauliai Elvar Már Friðriksson were signed as the new point guards to replace Kariniauskas and Smith. Rytas also signed Marcus Foster at guard. Rytas also re-signed Radzevičius and Uleckas to new contracts, and kept Normantas, Williams and Evaldas Kairys with the team. Coach Giedrius Žibėnas also remained with the team. During the pre-season, Marcus Foster lead Rytas in scoring. Rytas also signed Tomas Lekūnas to a short-term deal, as Withers had not arrived by the start of the season for personal reasons. Lekūnas later signed a deal for the rest of the season, while Withers had officially left the team. By March, Rytas had signed point guard Kendale McCullum, power forward Justin Gorham and center Jaime Echenique, with all three playing a big part in Rytas deep run in the LKL playoffs.

Rytas started the LKL season winning a close game against rival Juventus 90–88. They continued the good start by winning two more games, but an unexpected defeat to Nevėžis at home on the fourth game completely shocked the team. They lost their next two games to CBet Jonava and Lietkabelis Panevežys, finding themselves with a disappointing 3–3 record to start. Rytas recovered, going on a seven-game win streak, which included a win over new rivals, BC Wolves, 91–89 away, and against long-time rivals Žalgiris, 89–85 at home, in a game where Foster scored 34 points and famously waved off the Žalgiris fans. The rivalry with the Wolves largely started due to the fact that the Wolves became the new team in Vilnius, and the games between both teams became very heated as the Wolves became one of the most hated teams among Rytas fans and many former Rytas players, like Lukauskis, joined the team, as well as being coached by long-time Rytas coach Rimas Kurtinaitis. Wolves snapped Rytas win streak in the LKL, with an 88–76 win over Rytas in Vilnius. Rytas rebounded, winning the next 11 out of 12 games in the LKL, and scoring an amazing win over Žalgiris in Kaunas, 100–94, with Normantas scoring 30 points and Foster scoring 28 points, renewing a rivalry with Žalgiris and a fight for first place in the LKL. Žalgiris, however, won the final game of the regular season between the teams, 81–75, a win that guaranteed Žalgiris first place in the LKL regular season over Rytas. Rytas finished by winning their last 6 games, including a win in Vilnius over Wolves, 102–98, with a 27–6 record. In the LKL playoffs, in the quarterfinals, Rytas faced old rivals BC Neptūnas, winning a very tough series 2–0, beating Neptūnas both at home in overtime, 107–99, and away, 95–91. In the semifinals, while many fans expected a Rytas–Wolves matchup, in an unexpected twist, Rytas faced CBet Jonava, who had swept the Wolves in the quarterfinals, was a surprise team of the season, and had already shocked Rytas in the King Mindaugas Cup semifinals. This time, Rytas gained revenge by beating CBet 82–74 at home, 82–67 in Jonava, and 90–85 at home, to sweep the series for a 3–0 win for Rytas. In the LKL finals, Rytas faced off against Žalgiris. In the first game, Žalgiris beat Rytas 108–93 at home to take the lead. In the second game, Rytas got revenge, while a tight game by halftime, Rytas had a very strong second half, leading to a dominating 94–71 win in the Jeep Arena in Vilnius, tying the series 1–1. Žalgiris won the next game 95–80 in Žalgiris Arena, to once again lead the series over Rytas. The fourth game became a classic — Žalgiris led much of the way, including double digits, looking to finish the series — Rytas, however, kept coming back, backed up by a packed Jeep Arena. In the deciding minutes, Rytas made one final comeback, and Marcus Foster won the game for Rytas with a deciding layup, 69–68, tying the series at 2–2. In the deciding game, in a packed Žalgiris Arena, Rytas led much of the game, including in the final minutes, before Žalgiris made a run led by Isaiah Taylor and former Rytas captain Butkevičius winning the game 97–87, and the series 3–2, to regain the LKL title. While defeated, Rytas earned much praise, both from Rytas fans and experts, for giving the best fight they could against a Žalgiris team that reached the Euroleague playoffs.

Rytas lost to Nevėžis-OPTIBET in King Mindaugas Cup qualifiers in their first game, 78–70, having to win at least by nine points their second match in Vilnius to advance to the Final Four tournament, held in Šiauliai. In the second game, after regulation, Rytas had led Nevėžis-OPTIBET 81–73, necessitating overtime. In overtime, the much stronger Rytas made short work of Nevėžis-OPTIBET, winning 98–78 to qualify for the semifinals. One of the main favorites to win the tournament, along with Žalgiris, Rytas was expected to beat CBet Jonava in the semifinals. However, just like the previous season, history repeated itself. Rytas played poorly while CBet played one of the best games of the season, and CBet beat Rytas 92–86 in the semifinals in one of the biggest shocks in tournament history. For the third consecutive season, Rytas was eliminated in the King Mindaugas Cup semifinals. In the bronze medal game, Rytas, while erasing a huge deficit, could not defeat BC Lietkabelis, losing the game 91–88 and finishing in a disappointing fourth place. Žalgiris went on to win the tournament.

Rytas started their FIBA Champions League campaign slowly, losing the first two away games of the tournament to the defending champions Lenovo Tenerife 89–74 and then following it up with a loss against Bnei Herzliya 90–85. In following games, they crushed Peristeri B.C., coached by legendary player Vassilis Spanoulis, 89–64 on their home debut, and beat them again 82–71 in Athens. Marcus Foster, for his strong performances, earned the MVP of November honors. With a 2–2 record, Rytas had a chance to qualify to the playoffs directly, however, Rytas lost to Bnei Herzliya at home, 101–90, dropping to 2–3. In the final game of the regular season, Rytas faced Lenovo Tenerife at home-, winning the game 85–78, and finished in second place in the group with a 3–3 record. While not being able to directly qualify to the Round of 16 phase, Rytas faced off PAOK in the tournament's play-in where they beat PAOK at home 85–62. PAOK tied the series with an 81–78 win over Rytas in Thessaloniki. In the deciding game, at home, Rytas once again dominated and won 82–63 over PAOK, winning the series 2–1 and qualifying to the Round of 16. In the deciding game for Rytas in the Champions League, they were defeated in an away game 82–69 by Baxi Manresa. Foster continued his string of strong performances. Rytas beat Bahçeşehir Koleji at home, 95–88, and then faced one of the tournament favorites, Telekom Baskets Bonn, at both home and away. While Rytas came back after erasing a huge deficit in a home game, losing 86–79, they lost 99–72 in Bonn, with Rytas dropping 1–3. Rytas, still having a shot at the playoffs, earned a 92–69 away win against Bahçeşehir. With a 2–3 record, Rytas faced Baxi Manresa at home needing to win the game by 14 points to qualify for the playoffs. Baxi lead most of the game, but by the second half, Rytas had recovered and in the fourth quarter, took a 14-point lead over Baxi. Despite Rytas managed to win the game 96–95, Baxi qualified for the playoffs since both Rytas and Baxi finished with a 3–3 record, but a win by Baxi in the first game by 13 points led to Baxi's qualification. Foster finished the tournament as the top scorer.

==== 2023–24: Regaining the LKL championship ====
During the summer, McCullum, Fridriksson, Kairys, Lekūnas, Varadi, Echenique, and most importantly, team leader Marcus Foster all left the team, while Rytas re-signed team captain Normantas, Justin Gorham, Gytis Radzevičius and Martynas Echodas to new contracts during the summer. Coach Žibėnas was re-signed during the previous season. Rytas also signed new point guards Arnas Velička and R.J. Cole, center Javin DeLaurier and power forward Oskaras Pleikys to contracts. Keith Hornsby was initially signed as a replacement for Marcus Foster. Rytas also returned to play some home games in the Avia Solutions Group Arena, an arena now shared with inner-city rivals Wolves Vilnius.

During the Basketball Champions League season, Rytas started the season with a 0–2 record, with JDA Dijon, 87–83, and Promitheas Patras, 78–76, defeating Rytas in two away games. Rytas recovered with two dominating wins over BK Opava at home 99–63, and 95–75 away, and won home rematches against Promitheas, 77–75, and JDA Dijon, 79–77, to finish the regular season with a 4–2 record and one win behind group winners JDA Dijon, thus forced to fight for a spot in the Round of 16 in the Play-in tournament. Echodas, Normantas and Radzevičius lead the team in scoring during the regular season. Before the Play-in tournament, Marcus Foster returned to Rytas, replacing Hornsby. In the Play-in tournament, Rytas were heavy favorites against Peristeri Athens — the previous season, Rytas had easily beat Peristeri in the competition. Led by a more experienced Vassilis Spanoulis, however, Peristeri was not the same team as the previous season — Peristeri crushed Rytas in Vilnius, 110–92, and beat Rytas 83–80 at home in Athens, beating Rytas 2-0 and shockingly eliminating Rytas from the competition. While Marcus Foster provided a spark for Rytas, he was not able to save Rytas from the elimination.

In the King Mindaugas Cup, Rytas easily beat long-time rivals BC Juventus 98-86 and 104–67 in the quarterfinals. In the Final Four, held in Kaunas, once again, even with the addition of the returning Marcus Foster, Rytas failed — in the semifinals, 7bet-Lietkabelis, in a rematch of the previous two tournament semifinal and bronze medal games, once again beat Rytas, 94–86, in the semifinals — with Rytas missing another chance to return to the KMT finals. In the bronze medal game, Rytas beat BC Šiauliai, 94–89, in another hard-fought game to win the bronze medals. Žalgiris went on to win the tournament.

In the LKL, for most of the season, Rytas fought for first place in the standings, against Žalgiris Kaunas and against the Wolves, the latter of whom Rytas fought against for the title of the best team in Vilnius. Rytas won the regular season series against the Wolves, but were swept by Žalgiris, thus finishing behind Žalgiris in the regular season standings, at second place. In the games against the Wolves, much of the fan-support was behind Rytas. Fueled by the return of Marcus Foster, Rytas entered the playoffs fighting for at least a spot in the LKL finals- in the quarterfinals, Rytas beat CBet Jonava 110–77 at home, and 96–90 away, to win the series 2–0, and to set up a LKL semifinals clash against the Wolves, for the battle of Vilnius, as titled by both the players for each team, and the press. Homecourt advantage belonged to Rytas, but with each team sharing the Avia Solutions Group Arena court, neither team really had an advantage. Wolves started the series by shocking Rytas with a 96–85 win, taking the lead, before Rytas won the next two games, tainted with incidents by the players and even coach Žibėnas, 113-75 and 86–78. Wolves tied the series with a 97–86 win, to set up the deciding fifth game clash. Led by Foster, heavily supported all series by Rytas fans, Rytas won a hard-fought game 92–87 to finish off the Wolves and win the series 3–2, with Rytas returning to the LKL finals. Before the finals, rivals Žalgiris had suffered a huge blow as team leader Keenan Evans suffered a season ending injury — despite this, Žalgiris was still considered by most as the favorite to win the finals. Rytas had other ideas- in the first game, in Kaunas, Rytas beat the still shocked Žalgiris, by erasing a double digit deficit in the final minutes, in an overtime 89–88 win that took away the homecourt advantage for Žalgiris, with Rytas leading the series 1–0. In the second game, in Vilnius, once again, Žalgiris lead for most of the game, before Normantas and Foster sparked a comeback by Rytas — the game went to overtime, and again, Rytas managed to win, beating Žalgiris 104-94 and taking a 2–0 series lead. Žalgiris beat Rytas in Kaunas, 91–81. The fourth game became a classic — heavily cheered by over 9000 fans in the arena, Rytas would beat Žalgiris on a deciding layup by Foster, who scored 33 points, 88–87, to win the series and the LKL championship 3–1, winning their second championship in two years. The win by Rytas is considered by everyone to be the biggest upset ever in the LKL finals.

==== 2024–25 ====
Foster, Gorham, DeLaurier, Velička, Uleckas all left Rytas during the summer. Tubelis, the reigning LKL MVP, under contract with Rytas but who was laoned for Neptūnas the previous season, returned to Rytas. R. J. Cole, Normantas, Radzevičius, Masiulis, Pleikys (who had little playing time during the previous season, and would be loaned during this season to CBet Jonava) all remained with Rytas. Jayvon Graves and Savion Flagg were signed by Rytas as replacements for Foster, the team's top star and leader. Martynas Paliukėnas, known for this tough defense in the LKL, was signed to help Radzevičius in the small-forward position. Rytas signed Ignas Sargiūnas from Neptūnas, where he had formed a formidable duo with Tubelis, to strengthen the point guard position. Needing a center, Rytas surprised fans by signing Steven Enoch, one of the best EuroCup centers with Türk Telekom and who had some impressive performances with Baskonia Vitoria in the EuroLeague a few years prior. The new-look team was considered by many experts as even stronger than the previous year's LKL championship team.

In the LKL season opener, Rytas faced off BC Neptūnas, who proceeded to stun Rytas with a 90–84 win — for the first time, Rytas, as the defending champion, had suffered a defeat in the opening day of the LKL. Rytas then proceeded to win seven consecutive games in the LKL — including a satisfying home win over Žalgiris Kaunas. Rytas finished the LKL regular season with a 29–7 record — behind the league leading Žalgiris, but above rivals 7-bet Lietkabelis and Wolves-Twinsbet — against the Wolves, Rytas would prove their superiority both on the court (winning the season series) and off the court (the fans in Vilnius had much bigger attendances for Rytas, who played most of their games in the smaller Jeep Arena court) — the Wolves would end up suspending their operations after the season, with Rytas successfully defending their place as the top team in Vilnius. Tubelis, Cole and Radzevičius lead Rytas in the LKL regular season.

In the 2024-25 Basketball Champions League, Rytas had high expectations. With a strong team, Rytas was thought to finally break through to the playoffs. In the opener, Rytas was defeated by Unahotels Reggio Emilia in an away game, with Reggio Emilia winning 77–67. This proved to be the only loss for Rytas in the regular season — Rytas would dominate Śląsk Wrocław 98–75 at home and 98–88 away, and would also defeat Falco-Vulcano Szombathely 103–83 at home and 82–72 away, and would avenge their first round loss to Reggio Emilia with a 94–84 win at home — to win first place and direct qualification to the Round of 16 stage. The 5–1 record would be the best start for Rytas in the Basketball Champions League. Radzevičius was named the MVP of the Group stage, while Cole continued to shine as the new team leader. Rytas would start the Round of 16 in dominating fashion — an 86–66 home win over Galatasaray. Reigning champion Unicaja Málaga would beat Rytas 92–74 to snap the six game win streak of Rytas in the Basketball Champions League. Rytas would then face off Manisa Büyükşehir, coached by former Neptūnas, Lietkabelis and Žalgiris coach Kazys Maksvytis — a home 98–74 win for Rytas looked to almost certainly seal the qualification for Rytas in the Champions League playoffs. The second round, however, would prove to be nightmarish for Rytas — Manisa, now the home team, started with a shocking 98–75 thrashing of Rytas, while Galatasaray shocked the undefeated Unicaja at home. Galatasaray defeated Rytas 89–81 at home, giving Rytas very slim chances in the final round. In the final round, Rytas faced off Unicaja at home, while Galatasaray would face Manisa at home — Galatasaray won against Manisa, while Unicaja beat Rytas 83–82 in Vilnius in a heartbreaker — with a 2–4 record, Rytas was eliminated from the Champions League by Galatasaray. The signings of point guard Parker Jackson-Cartwright and returning center Artūras Gudaitis, who had to replace the injured Tubelis, largely flopped as both did not really make any contributions for Rytas in the Champions League. Enoch made the Basketball Champions League Star Lineup second team for the season. Cole and Radzevičius had breakthrough seasons with Rytas — as both remained team leaders through the competition.

In the King Mindaugas Cup, Rytas would face off Neptūnas in the quarterfinals — as Rytas beat Neptūnas 78–67 in Klaipėda, the return home game looked like a formality for Rytas. Through the first half, Rytas had a lead. In the third quarter, Neptūnas took control, and heavily supported by their fans in Vilnius, Neptūnas shocked Rytas with a 92–77 win in Vilnius — winning 159–155 on aggregate and eliminating Rytas in the quarterfinals. The Final Four, held in Vilnius, in Rytas second home court of Avia Solutions Arena, was won by Žalgiris.

In the LKL playoffs, Rytas dominated and defeated BC Šiauliai with 127-81 wins at home, and 110–84 win away, 2–0 series win. In the semifinals, Rytas faced off Lietkabelis. Both teams split the wins at home, with Rytas winning 86-82 and 87–86 at home, while Lietkabelis won 73-70 and 87–76 in Panevėžys. In the deciding game IN Vilnius, Rytas would not let Lietkabelis get close and finished the series with a 94–70 win and winning the series 3–2. During the series, Flagg went down with a season ending injury. Rytas would face off Žalgiris in the LKL finals. Coming in with a 35-game win streak (including 78–67, 83-76 and 97-79 wins over Rytas in the regular season) and home-court advantage, Žalgiris was considered the heavy favorites of the LKL finals. Rytas would have other ideas — Rytas shocked Žalgiris with a double-overtime 97–89 win in Kaunas, taking the home-court advantage from Žalgiris in the very first game. In Vilnius, it was Žalgiris who would win, beating Rytas 83–79, led by former Rytas player Deividas Sirvydis, to tie the series at 1-1. In the third game in Kaunas, many experts predicted it as the game Žalgiris would likely break the series — instead, Rytas would dominate and lead by as much as 22 points at one point — while Žalgiris did make a comeback, Rytas would beat Žalgiris 86–80 to take a 2–1 series lead — becoming the first team ever in LKL history to beat Žalgiris twice in the Žalgirio Arena during a series. The fourth game in Vilnius looked like a perfect finish to a story — a sellout with almost 9300 fans in the Avia Solutions Arena, and a motivated Rytas leading Žalgiris by as much as 17 points at the end of the third quarter — Žalgiris would come back, and with 7,7 seconds remaining, with Rytas up by two points, Sargiūnas, who had become one of the best players for Rytas during the series, would miss a free-throw — Sylvain Francisco, Žalgiris leader, would then make one of the most iconic plays in LKL history, winning the game for Žalgiris with a buzzer-beating three pointer, 84–83, to tie the series 2-2. In the deciding game, a sellout 14400 fans in the Žalgirio Arena, Rytas lead nearly 35 minutes — however, Žalgiris had other plans — led by Ignas Brazdeikis, in the deciding minutes, Žalgiris took the lead and went on to win 76–67, winning the series 3–2, and winning back the LKL championship.

The incredible efforts against the far stronger Žalgiris resulted in Rytas keeping Žibėnas as head coach — re-signing him to a new contract days after the finals.

==== 2025–26: Triumph and tragedy ====
Over the summer, Cole, Flagg, Enoch, Graves, Jackson-Cartwright departed Rytas, but the most painful of departures were that of team captain Normantas, who left after Rytas did not re-sign him after his contract expired, and Tubelis. Tubelis, who had a long-term contract with Rytas, terminated his contract to sign with rivals Žalgiris Kaunas — a shocking departure that left a void for Rytas both for the team, and the fans — in particular as Tubelis signed with Žalgiris soon after the finish of the heartbreaking LKL finals loss. The summer signings for Rytas included the top scorer of the Liga Endesa, Jerrick Harding, and Jordan Walker, who broke the record for most points in the Basketball Champions League the previous season, who were projected to be the new team leaders for Rytas. Jacob Wiley and Kay Brunhke were brought in as a replacement for Tubelis. Rytas also signed Simonas Lukošius after his successful stay in the NCAA. The biggest win of the pre-season was the re-signings of Radzevičius, named team captain, Pauliukėnas, Gudaitis, and Ignas Sargiūnas, who became a leader and a fan-favorite for his LKL finals appearance against Žalgiris.

For the first half of the season, Rytas had struggles in the 2025–26 Basketball Champions League. Rytas finished first in the group stage, with a 4–2 record, with both wins over Legia Warsaw (93–85 home and 79–77 away), and splitting the games against MLP Academics Heidelberg (83–92 away and 116–90 home) and Promitheas Vikos Cola (98–79 home and 95–111 away). Harding lead Rytas in scoring. A huge blow to Rytas became the departure of team captain Radzevičius at just about the end of the group stage. The duo with Walker and Harding also disappointed — with Walker in particular not meshing the team with his largely selfish play. Radzevičius was replaced with Jordan Caroline at the start of the Round of 16 phase — Gudaitis replaced Radzevičius as the new team captain. Speedy Smith also returned to Rytas, to help Marčiulionis at point guard. Rytas started with a win over Hapoel Netanel Holon 106–81 at home, before losing the next two games — Galatasaray MCT Technic beat Rytas in Vilnius, 89–85, and MSB Sarthe beat Rytas 78–72 in Le Mans. With the season on the line, Rytas made two changes — the erratic Walker was replaced by the returning point guard Augustas Marčiulionis, while Wiley departed and was replaced by the returning Martynas Echodas. The signing of Marčiulionis changed the year for Rytas — Rytas went undefeated in the second round, beating Hapoel Holon 106–98 away, Le Mans 101–81 at home and in the deciding game, Galatasaray 90–81 away to finish with a 4–2 record and qualify for the playoffs for the first time since joining the Basketball Champions League. Masiulis, Gudaitis, Lukošius, and in particular, Sargiūnas all shined for Rytas. In the quarterfinals, luck was on Rytas side — Rytas faced ERA Nymburk, and won the hard thought series 2-0 — winning 77–70 at home and 70–69 away, on a pair of last second free throws by Sargiūnas — Rytas qualified for the Basketball Champions League Final Four, held in Badalona. Rytas was projected to finish last in the Final Four. In the semifinals, Rytas continued their roll — a dominant, 87–69 win over multiple time champions La Laguna Tenerife opened the path to the finals — the first international final for Rytas since 2009. Rytas faced AEK Betsson — AEK was led by tournament MVP Frank Bartley, who finished first in the voting over Rytas stars Harding and Sargiūnas, and coached by the Best Coach winner Dragan Šakota, who finished over Žibėnas in the voting. Adding some extra fuel to the fire, longtime Žalgiris players Lukas Lekavičius and Mindaugas Kuzminskas also played for AEK. AEK dominated the start of the finals, leading by 15 at halftime, including a 20-point lead, and leading by 18 at the start of the fourth quarter. The game, however, was far from over — Rytas started cutting the deficit down, led by Harding, Sargiūnas and in particular Lukošius — Lukošius hit a pair of threes for Rytas to tie the game in the deciding seconds 80-80 — Lekavičius, having a chance to win it for AEK, missed the decider and the game went in to overtime. In overtime, there was no stopping Rytas — cheered on by thousands of Rytas fans, Rytas dominated the extra period, winning 92-86 and winning the Basketball Champions League — their first international trophy since 2009. Lukošius was named the MVP of the finals, with majority of his 23 points coming in the fourth quarter and overtime. Harding made the first Basketball Champions League Star Lineup, while Gudaitis made the second. Sargiūnas made the Team of the Round 16. Rytas returned to Vilnius as conquering heroes.

In the King Mindaugas Cup, Rytas beat BC Šiauliai 97–82 away and 99–94 at home, to qualify for the Final Four in Šiauliai, and beat Lietkabelis Panevėžys 106–89 in the semifinals to finally break the loop and qualify for the finals. The finals, however, were a one-sided formality — Rytas found themselves absolutely no match for Žalgiris, who beat Rytas 101–85 to win the King Mindaugas Cup. The tournament became the last game for Walker in a Rytas jersey, as he was replaced by Marčiulionis soon after.

In the LKL, however, Rytas had many issues. In December–January, Rytas suffered a five-game losing streak — the longest in club history. While Rytas fought off a challenge by the resurging Neptūnas Klaipėda and BC Šiauliai to keep the second place in the LKL standings, Rytas finished a record 11 wins away from first place Žalgiris — Žalgiris had absolutely dominated the LKL and Rytas during the year, sweeping Rytas for the season. Rytas finish of 20-12 was also the worst regular season finish for Rytas since 1998. Despite this, before the quarter-final series against Juventus Utena, Rytas was considered to be the easy favorite — even with all the struggles, Rytas was expected to challenge Žalgiris in the LKL finals. Instead, Rytas suffered the biggest fiasco in club history — Juventus beat Rytas 92–84 in Utena to start the series, and in Vilnius, finished off Rytas with a 101–95 win — defeating Rytas 2–0 in the LKL quarter-finals. One of the most embarrassing losses in Rytas history ended with Rytas being jeered off the court by their own fans — just two weeks after winning the Basketball Champions League. Žalgiris went to win the LKL championship, while Tubelis was named the LKL Finals MVP.

Days after the loss, Rytas fired coach Žibėnas. Žibėnas left Rytas as the most successful coach in Rytas history.

== BC Vilnius rytas anthem ==
"Laikas būti pirmiems"
De facto BC Lietuvos rytas club anthem

Marijonas Mikutavičius, the creator of de facto Lithuania Olympics Team song, Trys Milijonai, also created a special song for the BC Lietuvos rytas team, following its success in LKL and the very first steps in the prestigious EuroLeague. The song is called "Laikas būti pirmiems" (Time To Be First) and it is widely regarded as the club's anthem. To this day, it is still played after club wins or at time-outs during the home games.

== Players ==
=== Current roster ===
Note: Flags indicate national team eligibility at FIBA-sanctioned events. Players may hold other non-FIBA nationalities not displayed.

BC Rytas roster
Players
Coaches

Pos.	No.	Nat.	Name	Ht.	Wt.	Age
G	0	(United States)	Devoe, Michael	1.95 m (6 ft 5 in)	83 kg (183 lb)	26 – 17 December 1999
G	2	(United States)	Winston, Cassius	1.85 m (6 ft 1 in)	84 kg (185 lb)	28 – 28 February 1998
PG	3	(Lithuania)	Marčiulionis, Augustas	1.93 m (6 ft 4 in)	91 kg (201 lb)	24 – 21 March 2002
F	4	(United States) (Panama)	Lindo, Ricky	2.03 m (6 ft 8 in)	100 kg (220 lb)	26 – 26 September 2000
G/F	7	(Lithuania)	Radzevičius, Gytis	1.97 m (6 ft 6 in)	92 kg (203 lb)	31 – 17 July 1995
C	8	(Lithuania)	Gudaitis, Artūras (C)	2.08 m (6 ft 10 in)	115 kg (254 lb)	33 – 19 June 1993
F	9	(Germany)	Bruhnke, Kay	2.06 m (6 ft 9 in)	93 kg (205 lb)	25 – 15 July 2001
F/C	14	(Lithuania)	Pleikys, Oskaras	2.02 m (6 ft 8 in)	105 kg (231 lb)	25 – 20 March 2001
G/F	16	(Lithuania)	Urbonas, Ignas	1.99 m (6 ft 6 in)	93 kg (205 lb)	18 – 22 November 2007
F/C	21	(Lithuania)	Masiulis, Gytis	2.07 m (6 ft 9 in)	99 kg (218 lb)	28 – 10 April 1998
G/F	23	(Lithuania)	Jogėla, Matas	2.01 m (6 ft 7 in)	90 kg (198 lb)	28 – 10 July 1998
G/F	77	(Lithuania)	Paliukėnas, Martynas	1.95 m (6 ft 5 in)	94 kg (207 lb)	33 – 14 September 1993

Head coach

- (Lithuania) Nedas Pacevičius

Assistant coach(es)

- (Finland) Vesa Vertio
- (Lithuania) Mindaugas Brazys
- (Lithuania) Matas Juzeliūnas

Athletic trainer(s)

- (Lithuania) Tadas Jackūnas
- (Lithuania) Martynas Liuima

Physiotherapist(s)

- (Lithuania) Andrius Misiūra
- (Lithuania) Laurynas Zurza

Legend

- (C) Team captain
- Injured

- Roster
Updated: September 19, 2026

=== Depth chart ===
Pos.	Starting 5	Bench 1	Bench 2
C	Artūras Gudaitis	Gytis Masiulis	Oskaras Pleikys
PF	Ricky Lindo	Kay Bruhnke
SF	Gytis Radzevičius	Matas Jogėla	Ignas Urbonas
SG	Michael Devoe	Matt Thomas	Martynas Paliukėnas
PG	Cassius Winston	Augustas Marčiulionis

=== Squad changes for/during the 2026–27 season ===
Note: exact date is listed for players who joined or left during season.

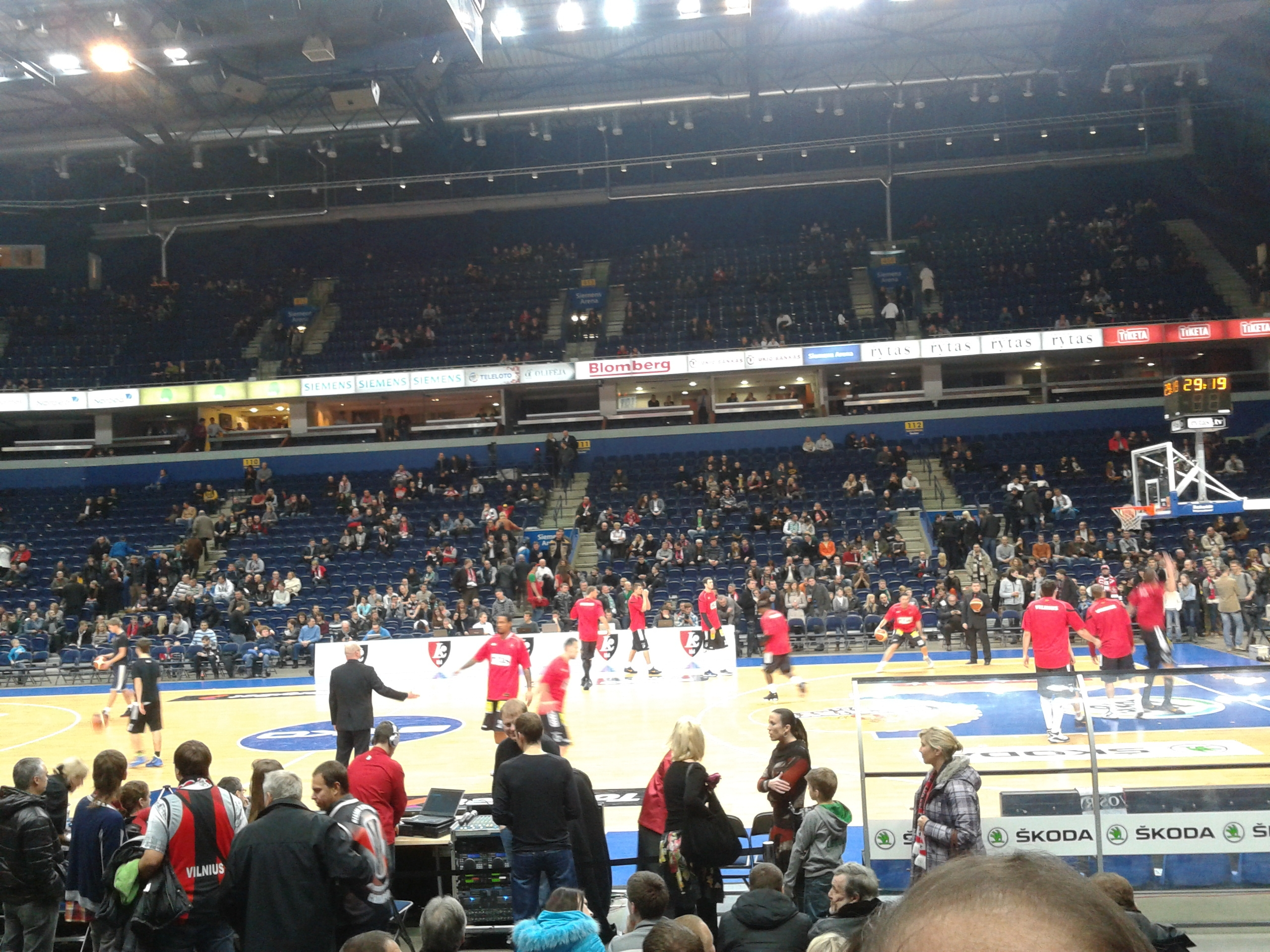
Lietuvos rytas warming-up before the game

==== In ====
No.	Pos.	Nat.	Name	Moving from	
—	HC	(Lithuania)	Nedas Pacevičius	Assistant coach	
—	F	(Lithuania)	Gytis Nemeikša	Hawaii	(United States)
0	G	(United States)	Michael Devoe	Türk Telekom	(Turkey)
2	G	(United States)	Cassius Winston	Hapoel Jerusalem	(Israel)
4	F	(United States) (Panama)	Ricky Lindo	JL Bourg	(France)
7	G/F	(Lithuania)	Gytis Radzevičius	Baskonia	(Spain)
14	F/C	(Lithuania)	Oskaras Pleikys	Šiauliai	(Lithuania)
23	G/F	(Lithuania)	Matas Jogėla	Dolomiti Energia Trento	(Italy)

==== Out ====
No.	Pos.	Nat.	Name	Moving to	
—	HC	(Lithuania)	Giedrius Žibėnas	Free agent	
10	G	(United States)	Jerrick Harding	Türk Telekom	(Turkey)
14	C	(Lithuania)	Martynas Echodas	Neptūnas Klaipėda	(Lithuania)
19	G	(Lithuania)	Nikas Stuknys	UT Martin	(United States)
22	G/F	(Lithuania)	Gantas Križanauskas	Portland State	(United States)
24	F	(United States)	Jordan Caroline	TSG GhostHawks	(Taiwan)
41	G/F	(Lithuania) (Germany)	Simonas Lukošius	Dubai Basketball	(United Arab Emirates)
43	G/F	(Lithuania)	Ignas Sargiūnas	Fenerbahçe	(Turkey)
44	PG	(United States)	Speedy Smith	Pallacanestro Reggiana	(Italy)

==== Loaned Out ====
No.	Pos.	Nat.	Name	Moving to	
	F	(Lithuania)	Gytis Nemeikša	Lietkabelis Panevėžys	(Lithuania)

=== Retired numbers ===
Rytas retired numbers
No.	Nat.	Player	Pos.	Tenure	Date
5	(Lithuanian Basketball Federation)	Steponas Babrauskas	SG	2003–2004, 2008–2014	29 April 2025
7	(Lithuanian Basketball Federation)	Arvydas Macijauskas	SG	1999–2003	11 November 2023
13	(USA Basketball)	Chuck Eidson	F/G	2007–2009	18 April 2024

== Honours ==
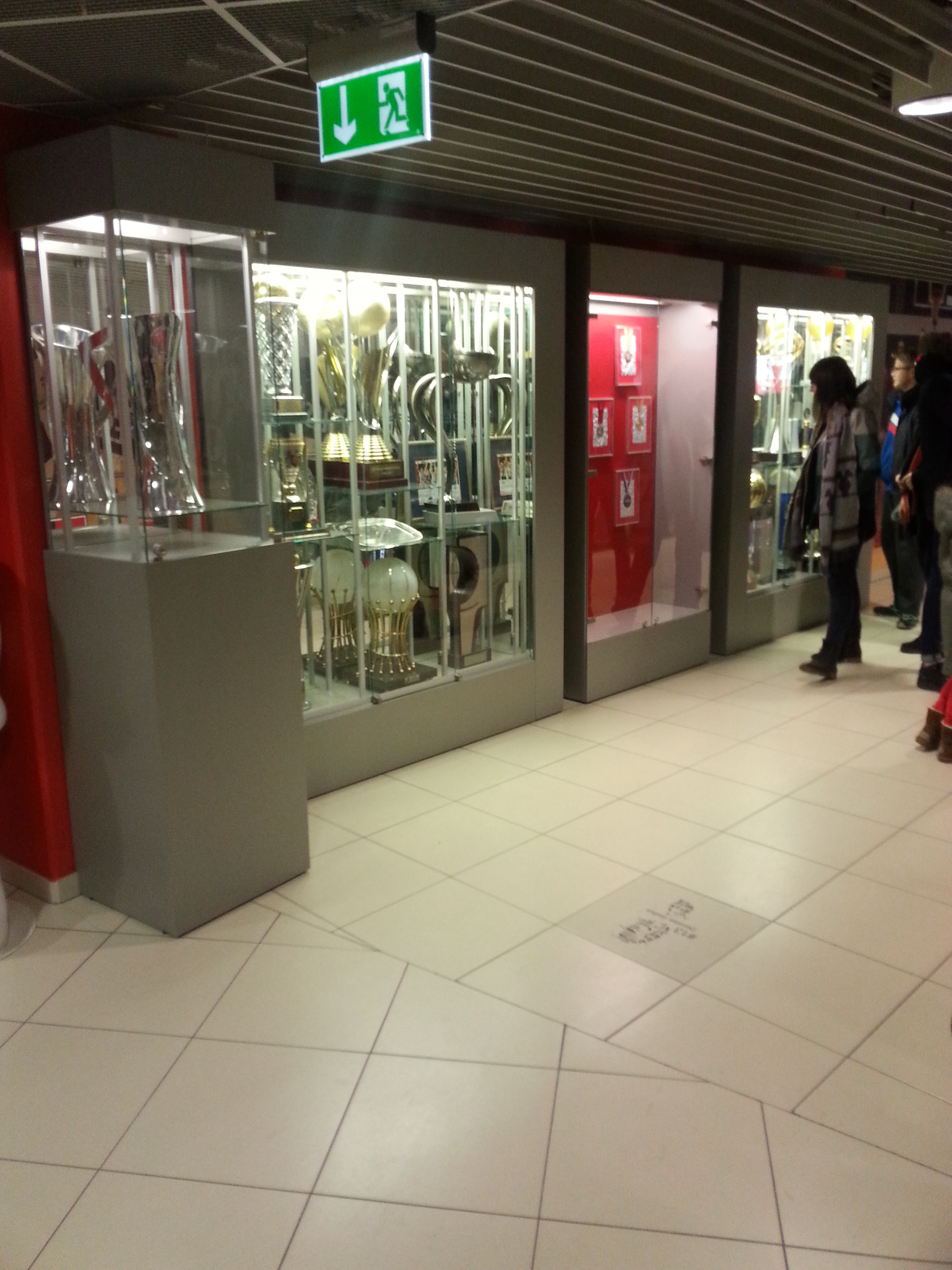
BC Rytas Alley of Glory in Siemens Arena

Total titles: 31

Domestic	Regional	European	Pre-season
Lithuanian SSR Championship; Winners (6): 1972, 1973, 1975, 1977, 1981, 1984 (as Statyba); Lithuanian League; Winners (7): 2000, 2002, 2006, 2009, 2010, 2022, 2024; Lithuanian Cup; Winners (3): 1998, 2009, 2010; King Mindaugas Cup; Winners (2): 2016, 2019	North European Basketball League; Winners (1): 2002; Runners-up (2): 2000, 2003; Third place (2): 1999, 2001; Baltic Basketball League; Winners (3): 2006, 2007, 2009; Runners-up (4): 2005, 2008, 2010, 2012; Third place (1): 2011	FIBA Champions League; Winners (1): 2026; EuroCup; Winners (2): 2005, 2009; Runners-up (1): 2007; Third place (1): 2012; Small Triple Crown (unofficial); Winners (1): 2009	2 Druskininkai, Lithuania Invitational Game: 2007, 2009; 1 Toulouges, France Invitational Game: 2007; 1 BBL Presidents Cup: 2008; 1 Alytus Mayors Cup: 2015; 1 Vladas Garastas Cup: 2015, 2017

== Season by season ==
Season	LKL	LKF Cup KMT Cup	Regional Competitions	Europe	Roster For more detailed information see Former Lietuvos rytas rosters	Head coach
1997–98	3rd place	Champion	—	Korać Cup; Top 32	Marius Janišius, Arnas Kazlauskas, Egidijus Mikalajūnas, Aurimas Palšis, Martynas Purlys, Virginijus Sirvydis, Rolandas Skaisgirys, Gintaras Stulga, Andrius Šakalys, Andrius Šležas, Rolandas Vaičiūnas	Paulauskas, Vainauskas
1998–99	Finalist	—	NEBL; 3rd place	Saporta Cup; Top 32	Darius Dimavičius, Andrius Giedraitis, Šarūnas Jasikevičius, Arnas Kazlauskas, Kęstutis Kemzūra, Rimas Kurtinaitis, Egidijus Mikalajūnas, Makhtar N'Diaye, Aurimas Palšis, Martynas Purlys, Roman Safronov, Virginijus Sirvydis, Ramūnas Šiškauskas, Singaras Tribė, Andrius Vyšniauskas	Vainauskas, Sakalauskas
1999–2000	Champion	—	NEBL; Finalist	Saporta Cup; Semifinalist	Giedrius Aidietis, Mantas Česnauskis, Valerij Četovič, Eric Elliott, Andrius Giedraitis, Rolandas Jarutis, Robertas Javtokas, Gintaras Kadžiulis, Arnas Kazlauskas, Arvydas Macijauskas, Oleksandr Okunsky, Mlađan Šilobad, Ramūnas Šiškauskas, Andrius Šležas, Andrius Vyšniauskas	Vainauskas, Sakalauskas
2000–01	Finalist	—	NEBL; 3rd place	SuproLeague; Top 16	Valerij Četovič, Eric Elliott, Andrius Giedraitis, Greg Grant, Rolandas Jarutis, Artūras Javtokas, Robertas Javtokas, Gintaras Kadžiulis, Arnas Kazlauskas, Arvydas Macijauskas, Ramūnas Šiškauskas, Kęstutis Šeštokas, Andrius Šležas	Sakalauskas, Vainauskas
2001–02	Champion	—	NEBL; Champion	Saporta Cup; Quarterfinalist	Vedran Bosnić, Mantas Česnauskis, Simas Jasaitis, Artūras Javtokas, Robertas Javtokas, Walsh Jordan, Rimantas Kaukėnas, Aivaras Kiaušas, Arvydas Macijauskas, Kęstutis Marčiulionis, Kęstutis Šeštokas, Ramūnas Šiškauskas, Andrius Šležas, Andrius Vyšniauskas	Vainauskas, Kazlauskas
2002–03	Finalist	—	NEBL; Finalist	Champions Cup; Group stage	Povilas Čukinas, Tomas Delininkaitis, Simas Jasaitis, Artūras Javtokas, Aaron Lucas, Aivaras Kiaušas, Vladimir Krstić, Arvydas Macijauskas, Oleksandr Okunsky, Kęstutis Šeštokas, Ramūnas Šiškauskas, Andrius Šležas, Steve Woodberry	Kazlauskas
2003–04	Finalist	—	—	ULEB Cup; Quarterfinalist	Steponas Babrauskas, Povilas Čukinas, Tomas Delininkaitis, Miljan Goljović, Simas Jasaitis, Robertas Javtokas, Saulius Kuzminskas, Aaron Lucas, Mindaugas Lukauskis, Dickey Simpkins, Ramūnas Šiškauskas, Andrius Šležas	Kazlauskas, Kemzūra
2004–05	Finalist	—	BBL Elite Division; Finalist	ULEB Cup; Champion	Povilas Čukinas, Tomas Delininkaitis, Gintaras Einikis, Fred House, Rolandas Jarutis, Simas Jasaitis, Robertas Javtokas, Saulius Kuzminskas, Aaron Lucas, Mindaugas Lukauskis, Haris Mujezinović, Tyrone Nesby, Kęstutis Šeštokas, Andrius Šležas, Roberts Štelmahers	Đurović, Mahorič
2005–06	Champion	—	BBL Elite Division; Champion	EuroLeague; Top 16	Steponas Babrauskas, Maurice Baker, Sandis Buškevics, Povilas Čukinas, Tomas Delininkaitis, Ernestas Ežerskis, Fred House, Simas Jasaitis, Robertas Javtokas, Mindaugas Lukauskis, Haris Mujezinović, Matthew Nielsen, Ivan Tomas, Andrius Šležas, Roberts Štelmahers	Spahija
2006–07	Finalist	Finalist	BBL Elite Division; Champion	ULEB Cup; Finalist	J. P. Batista, Jānis Blūms, Tomas Delininkaitis, Andre Emmett, Martynas Gecevičius, Titus Ivory, Artūras Jomantas, Evaldas Kairys, Ivan Koljević, Mindaugas Lukauskis, Matthew Nielsen, Darius Pakamanis, Marijonas Petravičius, Kareem Rush, Andrius Šležas, Roberts Štelmahers, Eurelijus Žukauskas	Drucker, Sagadin, Trifunović
2007–08	Finalist	Finalist	BBL Elite Division; Finalist	EuroLeague; Top 16	Michailas Anisimovas, Kenan Bajramović, J. P. Batista, Lukas Brazdauskis, Simas Buterlevičius, Chuck Eidson, Martynas Gecevičius, Artūras Jomantas, Jared Jordan, Mindaugas Lukauskis, Darrel Mitchell, Matthew Nielsen, Marijonas Petravičius, Hollis Price, Jackson Vroman, Andrius Šležas, Roberts Štelmahers	Trifunović
2008–09	Champion	Champion	BBL Elite Division; Champion	EuroCup; Champion	Michailas Anisimovas, Steponas Babrauskas, Milko Bjelica, Lukas Brazdauskis, Simas Buterlevičius, Evaldas Dainys, Chuck Eidson, Martynas Gecevičius, Artūras Jomantas, Mindaugas Lukauskis, Branko Milisavljević, Matthew Nielsen, Marijonas Petravičius, Marius Prekevičius, Justas Sinica, Tautvydas Šležas, Donatas Zavackas	Sireika, Kurtinaitis
2009–10	Champion	Champion	BBL Elite Division; Finalist	EuroLeague; Group stage	Steponas Babrauskas, Kenan Bajramović, Aron Baynes, Milko Bjelica, Dejan Borovnjak, Lukas Brazdauskis, Simas Buterlevičius, Evaldas Dainys, Martynas Gecevičius, Vidas Ginevičius, Artūras Jomantas, Igor Milošević, Bojan Popović, Justas Sinica, Jonas Valančiūnas, Donatas Zavackas	Kurtinaitis
2010–11	Finalist	Finalist	BBL Elite Division; 3rd place	EuroLeague; Top 16	Steponas Babrauskas, Kenan Bajramović, Petras Baločka, Milko Bjelica, Simas Buterlevičius, Khalid El-Amin, Martynas Gecevičius, Simas Jasaitis, Šarūnas Jasikevičius, Jerry Johnson, Artūras Jomantas, Žydrūnas Kelys, Igor Milošević, Cemal Nalga, Brad Newley, Karolis Petrukonis, Aleksandar Rašić, D. J. Strawberry, Arvydas Šikšnius, Jonas Valančiūnas	Anzulović, Trifunović, Maskoliūnas
2010–11	Finalist	Finalist	VTB; Group Stage	EuroLeague; Top 16	Steponas Babrauskas, Kenan Bajramović, Petras Baločka, Milko Bjelica, Simas Buterlevičius, Khalid El-Amin, Martynas Gecevičius, Simas Jasaitis, Šarūnas Jasikevičius, Jerry Johnson, Artūras Jomantas, Žydrūnas Kelys, Igor Milošević, Cemal Nalga, Brad Newley, Karolis Petrukonis, Aleksandar Rašić, D. J. Strawberry, Arvydas Šikšnius, Jonas Valančiūnas	Anzulović, Trifunović, Maskoliūnas
2011–12	Finalist	—	BBL Elite Division; Finalist	EuroLeague qualifying Finalist	Steponas Babrauskas, Paulius Dambrauskas, Vilmantas Dilys, Goran Jeretin, Artūras Jomantas, Mindaugas Katelynas, Brad Newley, Aleksandar Rašić, Dovydas Redikas, Tyrese Rice, Lawrence Roberts, Predrag Samardžiski, Renaldas Seibutis, Jonas Valančiūnas	Džikić
2011–12	Finalist	—	VTB; 3rd place	EuroCup; 3rd place	Steponas Babrauskas, Paulius Dambrauskas, Vilmantas Dilys, Goran Jeretin, Artūras Jomantas, Mindaugas Katelynas, Brad Newley, Aleksandar Rašić, Dovydas Redikas, Tyrese Rice, Lawrence Roberts, Predrag Samardžiski, Renaldas Seibutis, Jonas Valančiūnas	Džikić
2012–13	Finalist	—	VTB; Group Stage	EuroLeague; Group Stage	Steponas Babrauskas, Eimantas Bendžius, Jānis Blūms, Simas Buterlevičius, Vilmantas Dilys, Deividas Dulkys, Dejan Ivanov, Artūras Jomantas, Mindaugas Katelynas, Tautvydas Lydeka, Nemanja Nedović, Patrick O'Bryant, Milt Palacio, Leon Radošević, Dovydas Redikas, Predrag Samardžiski, Renaldas Seibutis, Tomislav Zubčić	Džikić, Maskoliūnas, Bauermann
2013–14	3rd place	Finalist	VTB; Semifinals	Qualified For EuroLeague	Steponas Babrauskas, Eimantas Bendžius, Omar Cook, Paulius Dambrauskas, Zabian Dowdell, Deividas Dulkys, Martynas Gecevičius, Andreas Glyniadakis, Stevan Jelovac, Antanas Kavaliauskas, Tautvydas Lydeka, Gediminas Orelik, Juan Palacios, Dovydas Redikas, Renaldas Seibutis, Darius Songaila, Edvinas Šeškus, Milenko Tepić	Bauermann, Petrović, Adomaitis
2013–14	3rd place	Finalist	VTB; Semifinals	EuroLeague; Group Stage	Steponas Babrauskas, Eimantas Bendžius, Omar Cook, Paulius Dambrauskas, Zabian Dowdell, Deividas Dulkys, Martynas Gecevičius, Andreas Glyniadakis, Stevan Jelovac, Antanas Kavaliauskas, Tautvydas Lydeka, Gediminas Orelik, Juan Palacios, Dovydas Redikas, Renaldas Seibutis, Darius Songaila, Edvinas Šeškus, Milenko Tepić	Bauermann, Petrović, Adomaitis
2013–14	3rd place	Finalist	VTB; Semifinals	EuroCup; Eighth-finals	Steponas Babrauskas, Eimantas Bendžius, Omar Cook, Paulius Dambrauskas, Zabian Dowdell, Deividas Dulkys, Martynas Gecevičius, Andreas Glyniadakis, Stevan Jelovac, Antanas Kavaliauskas, Tautvydas Lydeka, Gediminas Orelik, Juan Palacios, Dovydas Redikas, Renaldas Seibutis, Darius Songaila, Edvinas Šeškus, Milenko Tepić	Bauermann, Petrović, Adomaitis
2014–15	Finalist	Finalist	—	EuroCup; Eighth-finals	Travis Leslie, Simas Jasaitis, Paulius Dambrauskas, Adas Juškevičius, Mindaugas Lukauskis, Billy Baron, Edvinas Šeškus, Artūras Valeika, Kšyštof Lavrinovič, Martynas Gecevičius, Gediminas Orelikas, Žygimantas Janavičius, Antanas Kavaliauskas, Mike Moser	Šeškus, Nicola
2015–16	3rd place	Champion	—	EuroCup; Group Stage	Adam Łapeta, Antanas Kavaliauskas, Gediminas Orelik, Mindaugas Lukauskis, Kendrick Brown, Artūras Gudaitis, Nicolás Laprovíttola, Kšyštof Lavrinovič, Deividas Gailius, Adas Juškevičius, Denys Lukashov, Artūras Jomantas, Marius Runkauskas, Julius Jucikas, Rokas Giedraitis, Žygimantas Janavičius, Edvinas Šeškus, Aistis Pilauskas	Nicola, Jasilionis, Gronskis, Pačėsas
2016–17	3rd place	Quarterfinals	—	EuroCup; Top 16	Artūras Gudaitis, David Logan, Drew Gordon, Kenny Kadji, Margiris Normantas, Taylor Brown, Clevin Hannah, Corey Fisher, Laimonas Kisielius, Deividas Gailius, Adam Łapeta, Lukas Kvedaravičius, Jimmy Baron, Josh Akognon, Artūras Jomantas, Deividas Sirvydis, Arnas Beručka, Julius Jucikas, Rokas Giedraitis, Rashaun Broadus, Domantas Vilys, Aistis Pilauskas	Pačėsas, Kurtinaitis
2017–18	Finalist	Finalist	—	EuroCup; Top 16	Ben Madgen, Margiris Normantas, Chris Kramer, Robert Carter, Mindaugas Lukauskis, Loukas Mavrokefalidis, Martynas Echodas, Jimmy Baron, Artūras Jomantas, T. J. Carter, Rokas Giedraitis, Travis Peterson, Egidijus Mockevičius, Deividas Sirvydis, Mindaugas Girdžiūnas, Arnas Butkevičius	Kurtinaitis
2018–19	Finalist	Champion	—	EuroCup; Quarter-finals	Eimantas Bendžius, Marek Blaževič, Arnas Butkevičius, Martynas Echodas, Matt Farrell, Mindaugas Girdžiūnas, Norbertas Giga, Manny Harris, Evaldas Kairys, Chris Kramer, Lukas Kvedaravičius, Derek Needham, Margiris Normantas, Artsiom Parakhouski, Aistis Pilauskas, D. J. Seeley, Dominique Sutton, Deividas Sirvydis, Rok Stipčević, Einaras Tubutis	Adomaitis
2019–20	Second place	Finalist	—	EuroCup; Season cancelled	Cameron Bairstow, Eimantas Bendžius, Dovis Bičkauskis, Marek Blaževič, Arnas Butkevičius, Francisco Cruz, Martynas Echodas, Karolis Giedraitis, Mindaugas Girdžiūnas, Tu Holloway, Evaldas Kairys, Augustas Marčiulionis, Deividas Sirvydis, Ąžuolas Tubelis	Adomaitis
2020–21	Finalist	Quarterfinals	—	Champions League; Regular season	Andrew Goudelock, Dovis Bičkauskis, Arnas Adomavičius, Gytis Radzevičius, Lukas Uleckas, Augustas Marčiulionis, Martynas Echodas, Mindaugas Girdžiūnas, Kristjan Kitsing, Rapolas Ivanauskas, Adas Šimonis, Rokas Gustys, Arnas Butkevičius, Ivan Buva, Ryan Boatright, Keith Benson, Maurice Ndour, Demetrius Jackson	Kairys, Žibėnas
2021–22	Champion	Third place	—	Champions League; Round of 16	Ivan Buva, Vaidas Kariniauskas, Arnas Adomavičius, Gytis Radzevičius, Lukas Uleckas, Speedy Smith, Tanner Leissner, Mindaugas Girdžiūnas, Martynas Pacevičius, Jarvis Williams, Adas Šimonis, Evaldas Kairys, Arnas Butkevičius, Marko Tejić, Rokas Jocius, Maurice Ndour, Margiris Normantas	Žibėnas
2022–23	Finalist	Fourth place	—	Champions League; Round of 16	Martynas Echodas, Evaldas Kairys, Gytis Masiulis, Justin Gorham, Lukas Uleckas, Tomas Lekūnas, Marcus Foster, Elvar Már Friðriksson, Benedek Varadi, Jarvis Williams, Adas Šimonis, Kendale McCullum, Modestas Babraitis, Jaime Echenique, Margiris Normantas	Žibėnas
2023–24	Champion	Third place	—	Champions League; Play–ins	Modestas Babraitis, R. J. Cole, Javin DeLaurier, Martynas Echodas, Justin Gorham, Gantas Križanauskas, Gytis Masiulis, Margiris Normantas, Gytis Radzevičius, Lukas Uleckas, Arnas Velička, Marcus Foster	Žibėnas
2024–25	Finalist	Quarterfinals	—	Champions League; Round of 16	Savion Flagg, Margiris Normantas, Jayvon Graves, Parker Jackson-Cartwright, Gytis Radzevičius, Artūras Gudaitis, Ąžuolas Tubelis, Ignas Urbonas, R. J. Cole, Gytis Masiulis, Gantas Križanauskas, Steven Enoch, Ignas Sargiūnas, Martynas Paliukėnas	Žibėnas
2025–26	5th place	Finalist	—	Champions League; Champions	Artūras Gudaitis, Augustas Marčiulionis, Ignas Urbonas, Kay Bruhnke, Gytis Masiulis, Gantas Križanauskas, Jerrick Harding, Ignas Sargiūnas, Martynas Paliukėnas, Artūras Vilutis, Martynas Echodas, Nikas Stuknys, Jordan Caroline, Danielius Kasparas, Simonas Lukošius, Speedy Smith	Žibėnas

Detailed information of former rosters and results.

== Team records in LKL ==
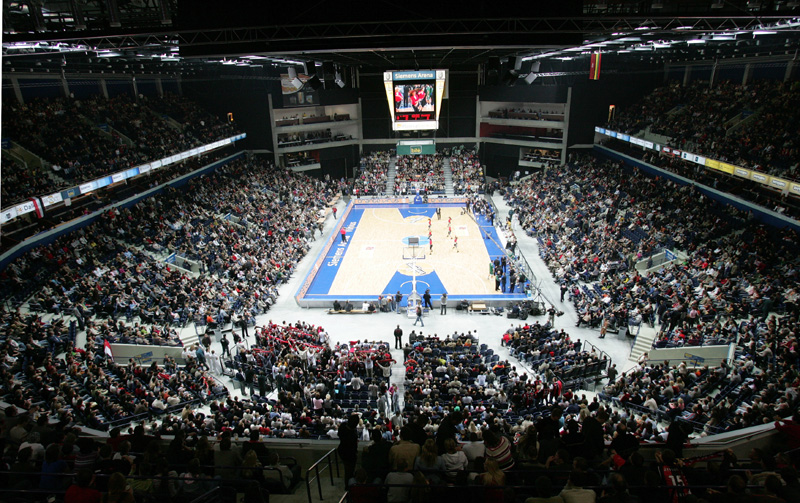
Rytas game in early 2006

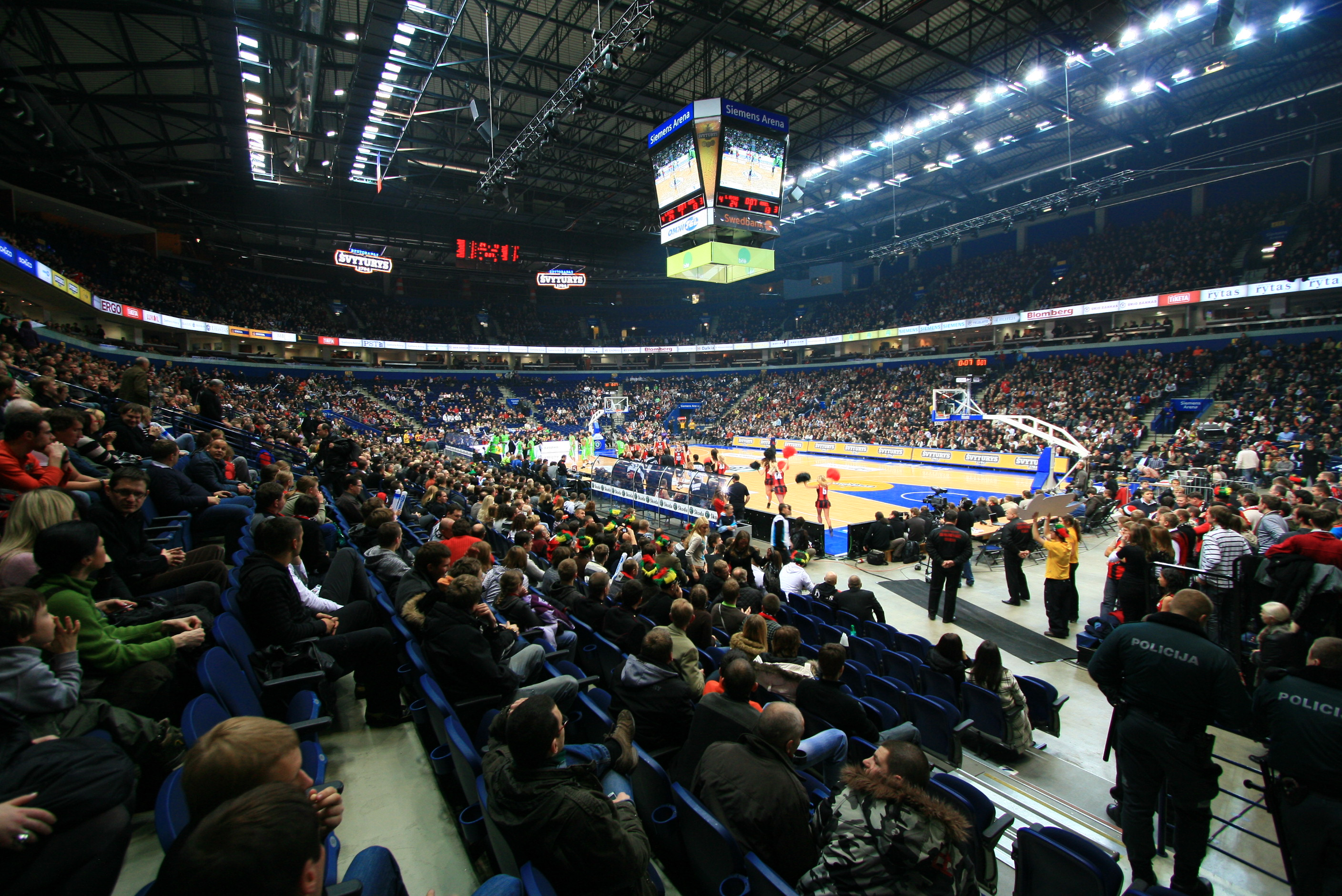
Rytas game in late 2008

Statistic	Record	Opponent	Result	Date	Venue
Points	134	Alytus	134–76	26 October 2008	Lietuvos rytas Arena
Rebounds	65	Prienai-Vytautas	113–56	6 January 2018	Lietuvos rytas Arena
Assists	37	Prienai TonyBet	102–65	11 June 2014	Siemens Arena
Steals	25	Nevėžis	92–40	11 October 2009	Lietuvos rytas Arena
Blocks	9	Olimpas	81–91	29 October 1997	Ekinsta Sports Hall
2-pointers made	43	Sakalai	112–67	9 March 2008	Lietuvos rytas Arena
2-pointers %	86.67%	Neptūnas	132–80	13 February 2003	Lietuvos rytas Sports Arena
3-pointers made	19	Juventus	96–103	28 October 2023	Utena Arena
3-pointers %	78.57%	Sakalai	73–91	17 September 1999	Palace of Concerts and Sports
Free throws made	37	Alita	110–102	5 March 1998	Ekinsta Sports Hall
Free throws %	100%	Šiauliai	77–89	4 April 2022	Šiauliai Arena

if a record is tied, a more recent occasion is put into the table
Last updated: 2024-05-09

== Important people and venues ==
=== Captains ===
Dates	Name
1997–1998	(Lithuania) Virginijus Sirvydis
1998–1999	(Lithuania) Martynas Purlys
1999–2001	(Lithuania) Andrius Giedraitis
2001–2003	(Lithuania) Andrius Šležas
2003–2006	(Lithuania) Robertas Javtokas
2006–2008	(Lithuania) Andrius Šležas
2008–2014	(Lithuania) Steponas Babrauskas
2014–2015	(Lithuania) Martynas Gecevičius
2015–2016	(Lithuania) Antanas Kavaliauskas
2016–2017	(United States) (Poland) David Logan
2017–2018	(Lithuania) Artūras Jomantas
2018–2019	(United States) Chris Kramer
2019–2020	(Lithuania) Eimantas Bendžius
2020–2022	(Lithuania) Arnas Butkevičius
2022–2025	(Lithuania) Margiris Normantas
2025	(Lithuania) Gytis Radzevičius
2025–present	(Lithuania) Artūras Gudaitis

=== Managers ===
Dates	Name
1997–2001	(Lithuania) Algimantas Ližaitis
2001–2010	(Lithuania) Jonas Vainauskas
2010–2017	(Lithuania) Martynas Purlys
2017–2018	(Lithuania) Darius Gudelis
2018–2019	(Lithuania) Julius Sarapinas
2019–2020	(Lithuania) Rolandas Jarutis
2020–2021	(Lithuania) Justas Jankauskas
2021–present	(Lithuania) Jaroslav Latušinskij

=== Presidents ===
Dates	Name
1997–2017	(Lithuania) Gedvydas Vainauskas
2017–2019	(Lithuania) Antanas Guoga

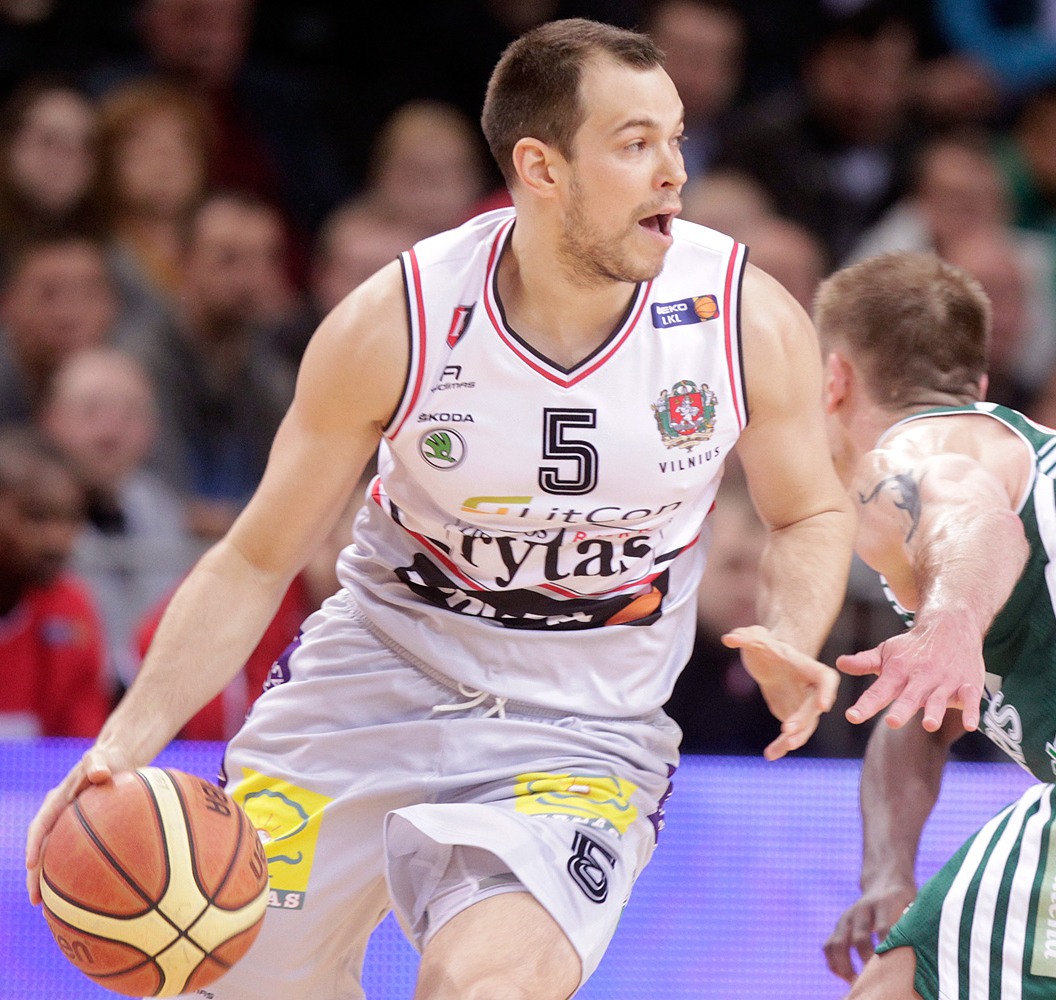
Steponas Babrauskas was a long-term Lietuvos rytas captain

=== Venues ===
Seasons used	Venue	Capacity	Notes
1971–2004	Vilnius Palace of Concerts and Sports	4,400	Since 1971 Statyba started to play in this Palace. After opening Lietuvos rytas arena in 1998, biggest games also was played in this Palace.
1997–1998	Ekinsta Sports Hall	1,000	Used in one season. Hall was opened in 1984 and demolished in 2022.
1998–2004	Lietuvos rytas Sports Arena (Olimpiečių street)	2,000; 3,500	At first capacity of 2,000, later expanded to 3,500.
2004–present	Siemens Arena/	11,000	Used for all EuroLeague/EuroCup/VTB games and some LKL games
2004–present	Jeep Arena	1,700; 2,500	At first capacity of 1,700, later expanded to 2,500; Used for most LKL games and practices.

== Notable players ==
Note: Flags indicate national team eligibility at FIBA-sanctioned events. Players may hold other non-FIBA nationalities not displayed.

Criteria

To appear in this section a player must have either:

- Set a club record or won an individual award while at the club
- Played at least one official international match for their national team at any time
- Played at least one official NBA match at any time.

=== In Statyba ===
- (Lithuania) Algimantas Ližaitis 1964–1971
- (Lithuania) Rimantas Endrijaitis 1965–1975
- (Lithuania) Mykolas Karnišovas 1966–1978
- (Lithuania) Juozas Rimkus 1966–1973
- (Lithuania) Juras Kaziūnas 1967–1973
- (Lithuania) Rimas Girskis 1968–1983
- (Lithuania) Eduardas Kairys 1968–1978
- (Lithuania) Edmundas Narmontas 1970–1985
- (Lithuania) Jonas Kazlauskas 1973–1985
- (Lithuania) Algimantas Pavilonis 1973–1985
- (Lithuania) Alfredas Vainauskas 1979–1990, 1993–1995
- (Lithuania) Šarūnas Marčiulionis 1982–1988
- (Lithuania) Romanas Brazdauskis 1983–1984, 1986–1988
- (Lithuania) Artūras Karnišovas 1987–1990
- (Lithuania) Alvydas Pazdrazdis 1989–1992
- (Lithuania) Martynas Purlys 1993–1995
- (Lithuania) Dainius Adomaitis 1993–1996

=== In Lietuvos rytas/Rytas ===
To appear in this section a player must be either:

- A player who has played at least 3 seasons (if foreign player) or 4 seasons (if Lithuanian player) for the club.
- A player who has won individual award.
- A Lithuanian player who has played for the Lithuanian national basketball team.
- A foreign international player who had significant impact (was a leader) in the club.
- Lithuania:
  - (Lithuania) Steponas Babrauskas 2003–2004, 2008–2014
  - (Lithuania) Eimantas Bendžius 2010–2014, 2018-2020
  - (Lithuania) Simas Buterlevičius 2007–2011, 2012–2013
  - (Lithuania) Arnas Butkevičius 2017–2022
  - (Lithuania) Povilas Čukinas 2002–2006
  - (Lithuania) Tomas Delininkaitis 2002–2007
  - (Lithuania) Darius Dimavičius 1998–1999
  - (Lithuania) Deividas Dulkys 2012–2013
  - (Lithuania) Martynas Echodas 2017–2021, 2022–2024
  - (Lithuania) Gintaras Einikis 2004–2005
  - (Lithuania) Deividas Gailius 2015–2017
  - (Lithuania) Martynas Gecevičius 2007–2011, 2013–2015
  - (Lithuania) Andrius Giedraitis 1998–2001
  - (Lithuania) Rokas Giedraitis 2015–2018
  - (Lithuania) Vidas Ginevičius 2009–2010
  - (Lithuania) Mindaugas Girdžiūnas 2017–2022
  - (Lithuania) Artūras Gudaitis 2015–2017
  - (Lithuania) Simas Jasaitis 2001–2006, 2011, 2015
  - (Lithuania) Šarūnas Jasikevičius 1998–1999, 2010
  - (Lithuania) Robertas Javtokas 1999–2006
  - (Lithuania) Artūras Jomantas 2006–2013, 2016–2018
  - (Lithuania) Adas Juškevičius 2014–2016
  - (Lithuania) Evaldas Kairys 2006–2007, 2018-2020
  - (Lithuania) Rimantas Kaukėnas 2001–2002
  - (Lithuania) Antanas Kavaliauskas 2014–2016
  - (Lithuania) Rimas Kurtinaitis 1998–1999
  - (Lithuania) Kšyštof Lavrinovič 2014–2016
  - (Lithuania) Mindaugas Lukauskis 2003–2009, 2014–2016, 2017–2018
  - (Lithuania) Arvydas Macijauskas 1999–2003
  - (Lithuania) Kęstutis Marčiulionis 2001–2002
  - (Lithuania) Gediminas Orelik 2013–2016
  - (Lithuania) Marijonas Petravičius 2006–2009
  - (Lithuania) Marius Prekevičius 2008–2009
  - (Lithuania) Renaldas Seibutis 2011–2014
  - (Lithuania) Deividas Sirvydis 2017-2020
  - (Lithuania) Darius Songaila 2013–2014
  - (Lithuania) Kęstutis Šeštokas 2000–2003, 2004–2005
  - (Lithuania) Ramūnas Šiškauskas 1998–2004
  - (Lithuania) Andrius Šležas 1997–1998, 1999–2008
  - (Lithuania) Jonas Valančiūnas 2010–2012
  - (Lithuania) Eurelijus Žukauskas 2006–2007
- United States:
  - (United States) Marcus Foster 2022–2023, 2023–2024
  - (United States) Andrew Goudelock 2020–2021
  - (United States) Demetrius Jackson 2020
  - (United States) (Montenegro) Omar Cook 2013–2014
  - (United States) Chuck Eidson 2007–2009
  - (United States) Khalid El-Amin 2010–2011
  - (United States) Drew Gordon 2016–2017
  - (United States) Fred House 2004–2006
  - (United States) Chris Kramer 2017–2019
  - (United States) Jimmy Baron 2017–2018
  - (United States) Travis Leslie 2014–2015
  - (United States) D. J. Seeley 2018–2019
  - (United States) (Poland) David Logan 2016–2017
  - (United States) Aaron Lucas 2002–2004, 2005
  - (United States) Tyrone Nesby 2004–2005
  - (United States) Hollis Price 2007–2008
  - (United States) (Montenegro) Tyrese Rice 2011–2012
  - (United States) Lawrence Roberts 2011–2012
  - (United States) Kareem Rush 2006–2007
  - (United States) Dickey Simpkins 2003–2004
  - (United States) (Lebanon) Jackson Vroman 2008
  - (United States) (Poland) Jerrick Harding 2025–
- Argentina:
  - (Argentina) Nicolás Laprovíttola 2015
- Australia:
  - (Australia) Aron Baynes 2009–2010
  - (Australia) Brad Newley 2010–2012
  - (Australia) Matthew Nielsen 2005–2008
  - (Australia) Ben Madgen 2017–2018
- Bosnia and Herzegovina:
  - (Bosnia and Herzegovina) Kenan Bajramović 2007–2008, 2010–2011
  - (Bosnia and Herzegovina) Haris Mujezinović 2004–2006
- Brazil:
  - (Brazil) J. P. Batista 2006–2008
- Colombia:
  - (Colombia) Juan Palacios 2013–2014
- Greece:
  - (Greece) Loukas Mavrokefalidis 2017–2018
- Latvia:
  - (Latvia) Jānis Blūms 2006–2007, 2012–2013
  - (Latvia) Roberts Štelmahers 2004–2008
- Montenegro:
  - (Montenegro) Milko Bjelica 2008–2011
- Serbia:
  - (Serbia) Stevan Jelovac 2013–2014
  - (Serbia) Nemanja Nedović 2012–2013
  - (Serbia) Bojan Popović 2009–2010
- Belarus:
  - (Belarus) Artsiom Parakhouski 2018–2019
- Senegal:
  - (Senegal) Maurice Ndour 2020–2021, 2021–2022

== Head coaches ==
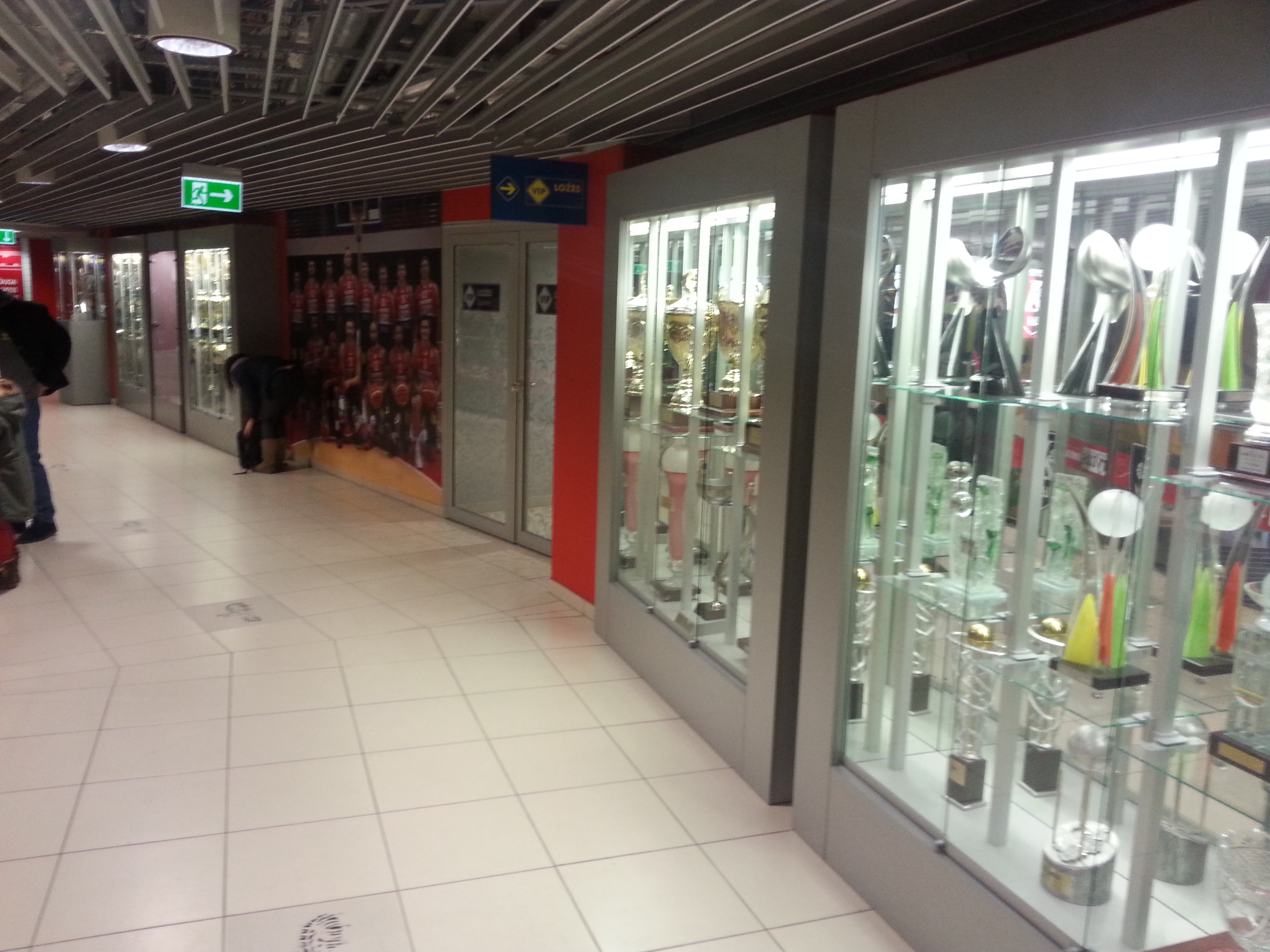
BC Rytas Alley of Glory in Siemens Arena with the won trophies

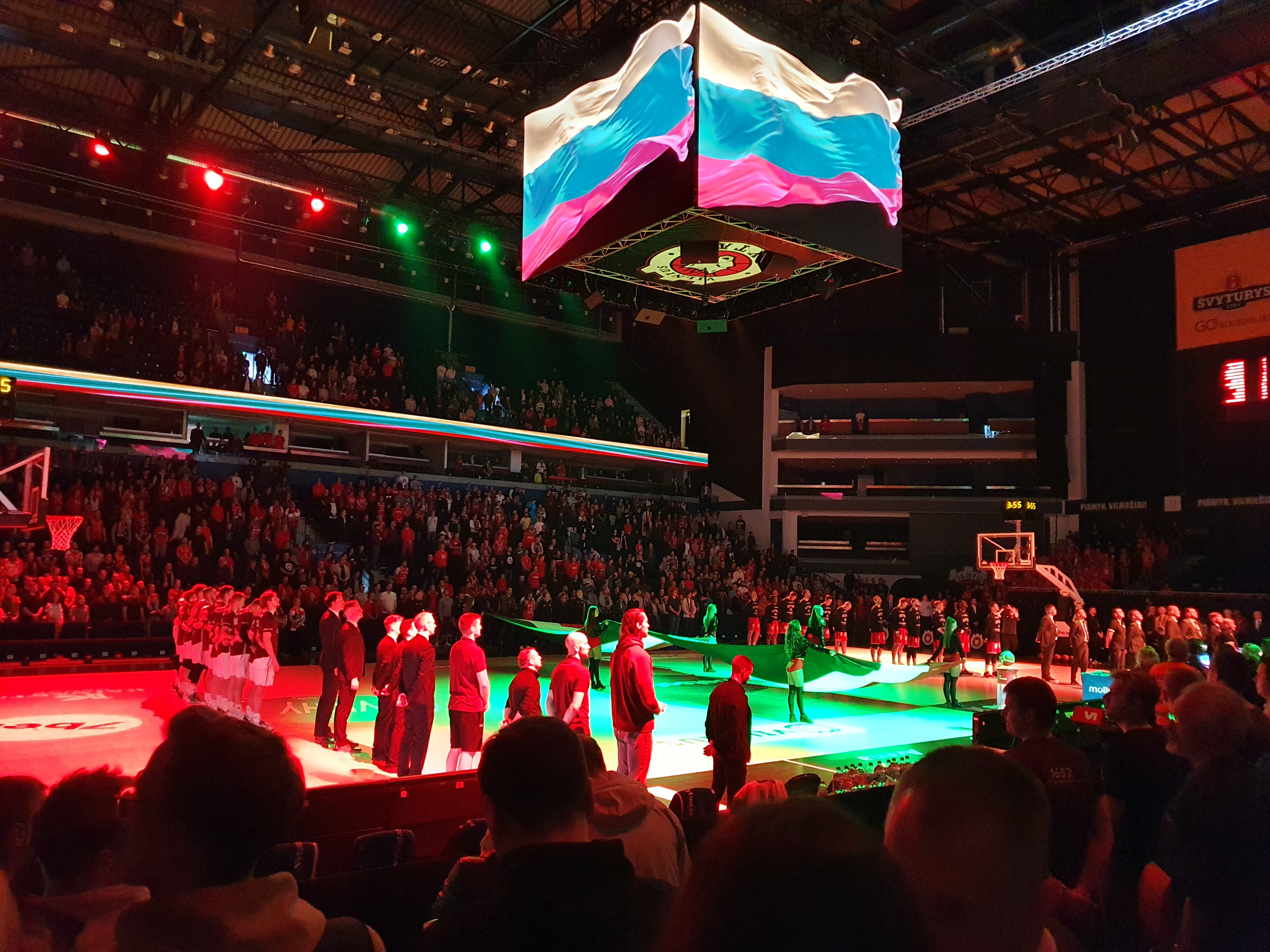
Singing of the Lithuanian national anthem before a game during the 2022 LKL Finals in Vilnius

The following head coaches won at least one major trophy when in charge of Rytas:

Name	Period	Trophies
(Lithuania) Alfredas Vainauskas	1997–2001	LKF Cup
(Lithuania) Šarūnas Sakalauskas	1998–2001	Lithuanian Basketball League
(Lithuania) Jonas Kazlauskas	2001–2004	Lithuanian Basketball League; North European Basketball League
(Slovenia) Tomo Mahorič	2005	ULEB Cup
(Croatia) Neven Spahija	2005–2006	Lithuanian Basketball League; Baltic Basketball League
(Serbia) Aleksandar Trifunović	2006–2008; 2010–2011	Baltic Basketball League
(Lithuania) Rimas Kurtinaitis	2008–2010; 2017–2018	2× Lithuanian Basketball Leagues; 2× LKF Cups; Baltic Basketball League; EuroCup
(Lithuania) Tomas Pačėsas	2016–2017	King Mindaugas Cup
(Lithuania) Dainius Adomaitis	2014, 2018–2020	King Mindaugas Cup
(Lithuania) Giedrius Žibėnas	2021–2026	2x Lithuanian Basketball League; FIBA Basketball Champions League

- (Lithuania) Modestas Paulauskas: 1997
- (Lithuania) Alfredas Vainauskas: 1997–1998, 2000–2001
- (Lithuania) Šarūnas Sakalauskas: 1998–2000
- (Lithuania) Jonas Kazlauskas: 2001–2004
- (Lithuania) Kęstutis Kemzūra: 2004
- (Serbia) Vlade Đurović: 2004–2005
- (Slovenia) Tomo Mahorič: 2005
- (Croatia) Neven Spahija: 2005–2006
- (Israel) Sharon Drucker: 2006
- (Slovenia) Zmago Sagadin: 2006–2007
- (Serbia) Aleksandar Trifunović: 2007–2008, 2010–2011
- (Lithuania) Antanas Sireika: 2008
- (Lithuania) Rimas Kurtinaitis: 2008–2010, 2017–2018
- (Croatia) Dražen Anzulović: 2010
- (Lithuania) Roberts Štelmahers: 2010
- (Lithuania) Darius Maskoliūnas: 2011, 2012–2013
- (Serbia) Aleksandar Džikić: 2011–2012
- (Germany) Dirk Bauermann: 2013
- (Croatia) Aleksandar Petrović: 2013–2014
- (Lithuania) Dainius Adomaitis: 2014, 2018–2020
- (Lithuania) Virginijus Šeškus: 2014–2015
- (Argentina) (Italy) Marcelo Nicola: 2015
- (Lithuania) Tomas Pačėsas: 2015–2017
- (Lithuania) Donaldas Kairys: 2020–2021
- (Lithuania) Giedrius Žibėnas: 2021–2026
- (Lithuania) Nedas Pacevičius: 2026–present

== Statistical leaders ==
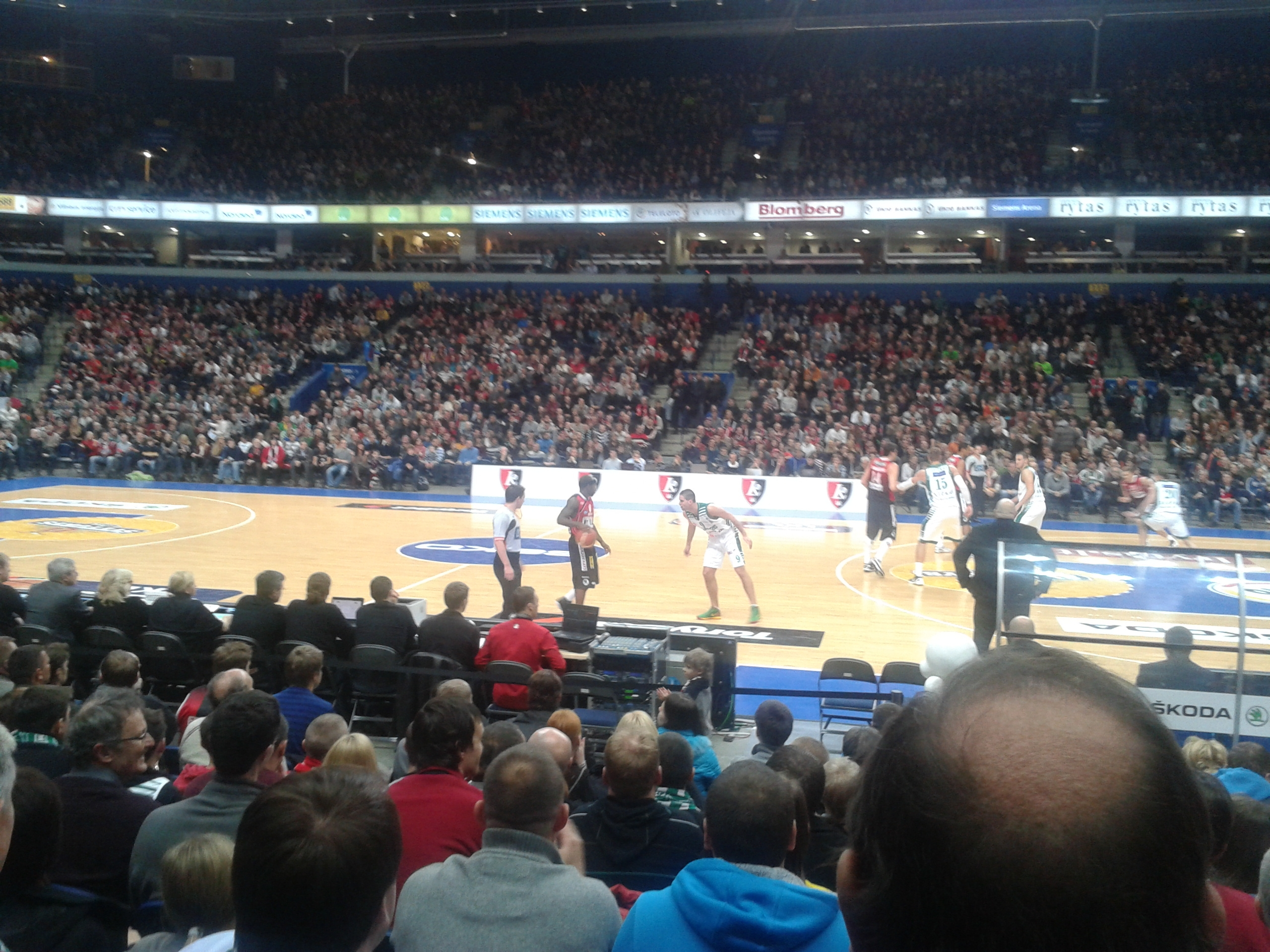
Lietuvos rytas versus Žalgiris in Vilnius

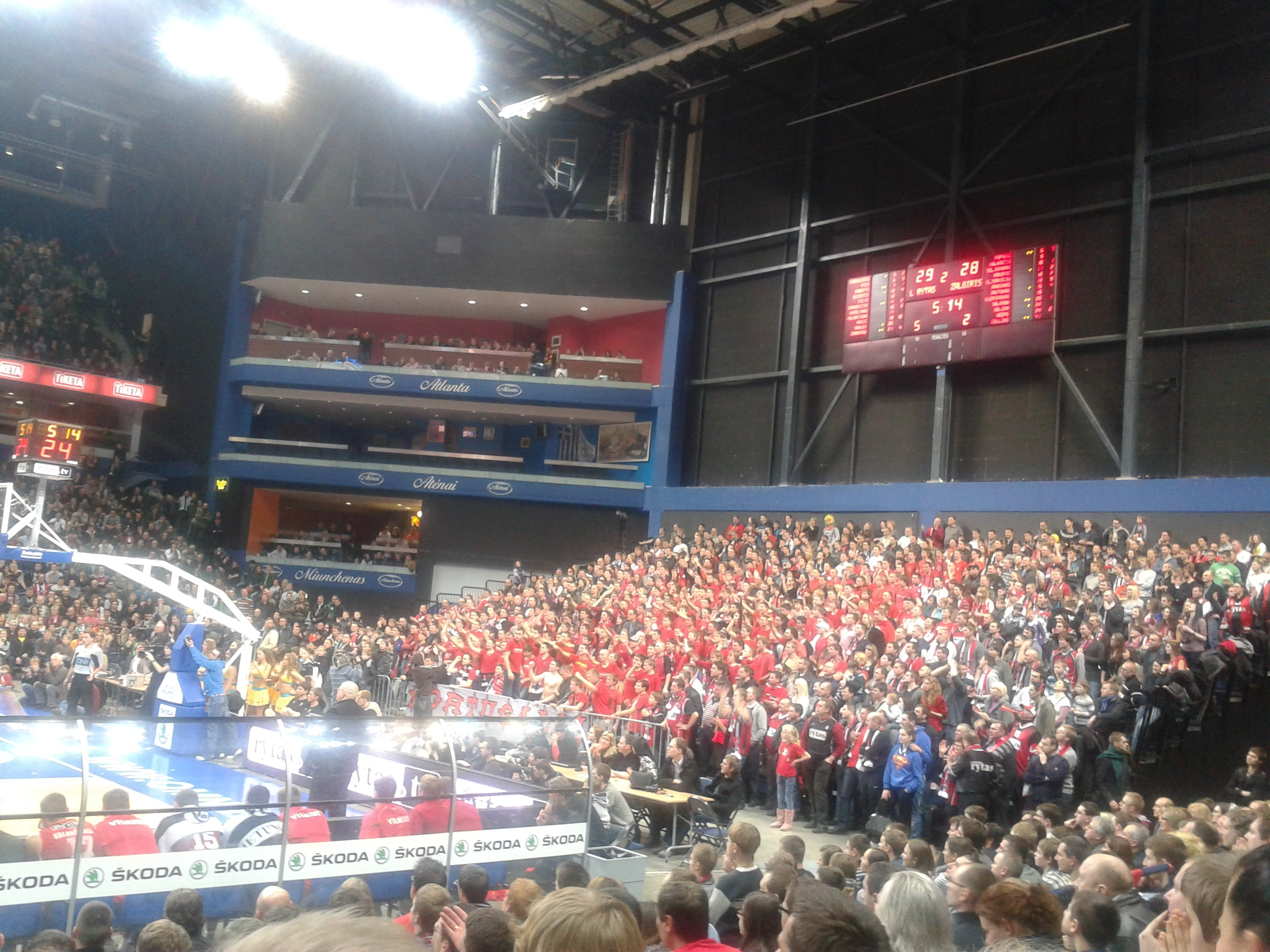
Lietuvos rytas fans during a LKL game

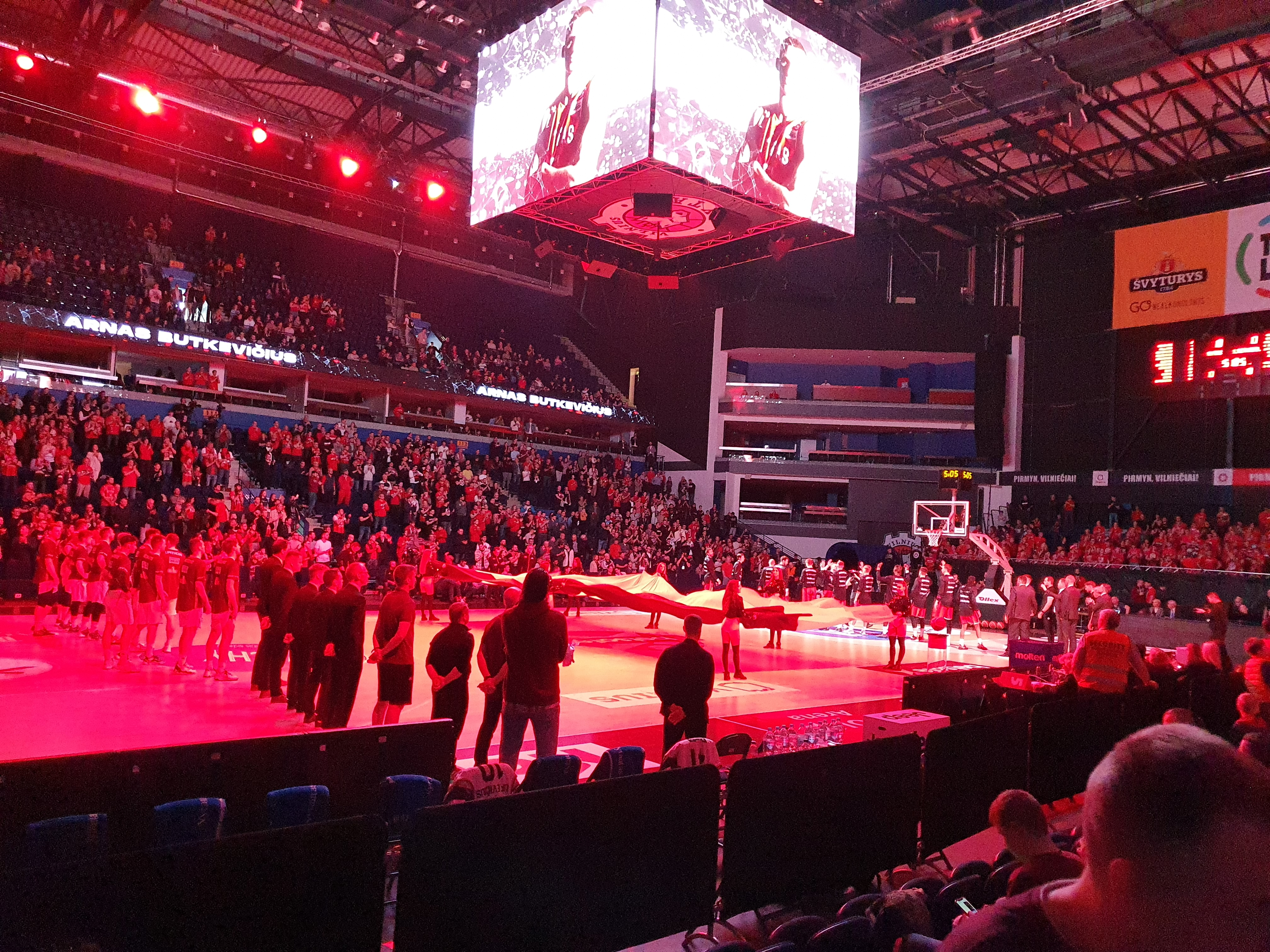
Pre-game presentation of the Rytas Vilnius during the 2022 LKL Finals

=== All-time points per game in European Cup games (PPG) ===
Only players with significant number of games played or points scored.^{‡}

Position	Nat.	Player	Seasons	Games	Total points	Points per game
1	(Lithuania)	Ramūnas Šiškauskas	6	75	1068	14.2
2	(Lithuania)	Arvydas Macijauskas	4	66	978	14.8
3	(Lithuania)	Martynas Gecevičius	7	92	875	9.5
4	(Lithuania)	Andrius Šležas	10	141	867	6.1
5	(Lithuania)	Robertas Javtokas	6	89	855	9.6
6	(Lithuania)	Mindaugas Lukauskis	9	128	781	6.1
7	(Lithuania)	Andrius Giedraitis	3	45	758	16.8
8	(Lithuania)	Artūras Jomantas	9	120	691	5.8
9	(Lithuania)	Renaldas Seibutis	3	44	590	13.4
10	(Lithuania)	Simas Jasaitis	7	77	575	7.5
11	(United States) (Poland)	Eric Elliott	2	39	573	14.7
12	(Lithuania)	Marijonas Petravičius	3	47	523	11.1
13	(Australia)	Matthew Nielsen	3	46	498	10.8
14	(Lithuania)	Steponas Babrauskas	7	86	473	5.5
15	(Lithuania)	Kęstutis Šeštokas	4	58	472	8.1

Last updated: 15 November 2016

== Individual awards ==
=== EuroLeague ===
EuroLeague MVP of the Round

Season	Week	Player	PIR	Opponent
2005–06	6	(Bosnia and Herzegovina) Haris Mujezinović	36	(Israel) Maccabi Tel Aviv B.C.
2007–08	2	(Lithuania) Artūras Jomantas	29	(Israel) Maccabi Tel Aviv B.C.
2010–11	12	(United States) Khalid El-Amin	29	(Spain) Caja Laboral

EuroLeague MVP of the Month

Season	Month	Player
2009–10	October	(Serbia) Bojan Popović

50 Greatest EuroLeague Contributors
Chosen:

- (Lithuania) Šarūnas Jasikevičius

Nominated:

- (Lithuania) Artūras Karnišovas (Statyba)
- (Lithuania) Rimas Kurtinaitis

EuroLeague Basketball 2001–10 All-Decade Team

- (Lithuania) Šarūnas Jasikevičius
- (Lithuania) Ramūnas Šiškauskas

=== EuroCup ===
EuroCup MVP of the Round

Season	Week	Player	PIR	Opponent
2003–04	13	(Lithuania) Robertas Javtokas	24	(Israel) Hapoel Jerusalem
2003–04	14	(Lithuania) Robertas Javtokas	35	(Israel) Hapoel Jerusalem
2004–05	6	(United States) Fred House	50	(Poland) Śląsk Wrocław
2008–09	9	(United States) Chuck Eidson	37	(Germany) Artland Dragons
2014–15	13	(Lithuania) Martynas Gecevičius	38	(Spain) Sevilla
2015–16	6	(Lithuania) Kšyštof Lavrinovič	36	(Turkey) Beşiktaş Sompo Japan
2016–17	13	(United States) David Logan	38	(Russia) Nizhny Novgorod
2017–18	2	(Lithuania) Rokas Giedraitis	31	(Serbia) Partizan NIS
2017–18	6	(United States) Chris Kramer	38	(Spain) RETAbet Bilbao Basket
2017–18	14	(Lithuania) Martynas Echodas	29	(Italy) Fiat Torino
2018–19	9	(Croatia) Rok Stipčević	41	(Italy) Fiat Torino

EuroCup Leaders

Performance Index Rating

- (United States) Fred House 23.90 (in 10 games) (2004–05)
- (United States) Chuck Eidson 21.27 (in 15 games) (2008–09)

Rebounds

- (United States) Drew Gordon 9.57 (in 14 games) (2016–17)

Best EuroCup coach of all time

- (Lithuania) Rimas Kurtinaitis

EuroCup Basketball Awards

Season	Player	Award
2004–05	(Lithuania) Robertas Javtokas	ULEB Cup Finals MVP
2008–09	(United States) Chuck Eidson	EuroCup MVP
2008–09	(United States) Chuck Eidson	All-EuroCup First Team
2008–09	(Lithuania) Marijonas Petravičius	EuroCup Finals MVP
2011–12	(Lithuania) Renaldas Seibutis	All-EuroCup First Team
2011–12	(Lithuania) Jonas Valančiūnas	All-EuroCup First Team
2011–12	(Lithuania) Jonas Valančiūnas	EuroCup Rising Star
2018–19	(Lithuania) Martynas Echodas	EuroCup Rising Star

=== FIBA Champions League ===
Champions League MVP of the Month

Season	Month	Player
2021–22	November	(Croatia) Ivan Buva
2022–23	November	(United States) Marcus Foster

=== Lithuanian Basketball League ===
LKL Finals MVP

- (Lithuania) Arvydas Macijauskas (2002, 2003)
- (Lithuania) Andrius Šležas (2006)
- (United States) Chuck Eidson (2009)
- (Lithuania) Martynas Gecevičius (2010)
- (Lithuania) Arnas Butkevičius (2022)
- (United States) Marcus Foster (2024)

=== Lithuanian Basketball League ===
LKL Season MVP

- (Lithuania) Ramūnas Šiškauskas (2001, 2002)
- (United States) Chuck Eidson (2009)
- (Lithuania) Jonas Valančiūnas (2012)
- (Colombia) Juan Palacios (2014)
- (Croatia) Ivan Buva (2022)

Slam Dunk Contest Champions

- (Lithuania) Robertas Javtokas (2000, 2001)
- (United States) Aaron Lucas (2003)
- (Australia) Aron Baynes (2010)
- (United States) Travis Leslie (2015)

Three-point Shootout Champions

- (Lithuania) Arvydas Macijauskas (2000, 2002, 2003)
- (Lithuania) Mindaugas Lukauskis (2018)
- (United States) Andrew Goudelock (2021)

=== Baltic Basketball League ===
Final Four MVP

- (United States) Kareem Rush (2007)
- (United States) Chuck Eidson (2009)

=== NEBL ===
Finals MVP

- (Lithuania) Arvydas Macijauskas (2002)

=== FIBA ===
FIBA's 50 Greatest Players (1991)

- (Lithuania) Šarūnas Marčiulionis (Statyba)

FIBA Europe Young Men's Player of the Year Award

- (Lithuania) Jonas Valančiūnas (2011, 2012)

== Matches against NBA teams ==
21 October 2008

Boxscore

Golden State Warriors (United States)	126–106	(Lithuania) Lietuvos rytas Vilnius

(United States) Oracle Arena, Oakland, California

== Video game ==
Lietuvos rytas basketball club was featured in the NBA 2K15 video game.
