= History of BC Rytas =

History of basketball team

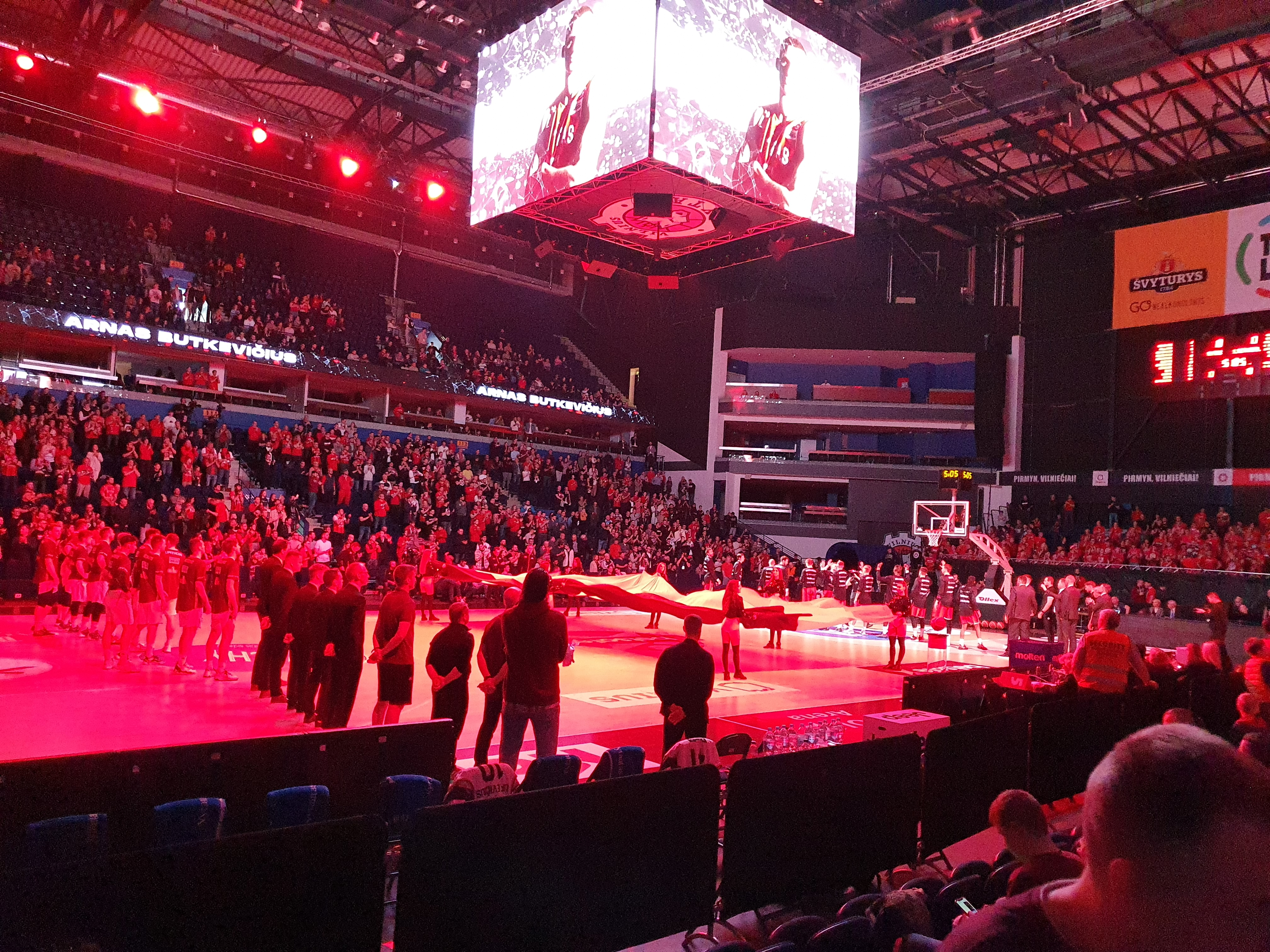
Pre-game presentation of the BC Rytas in a home court in 2022

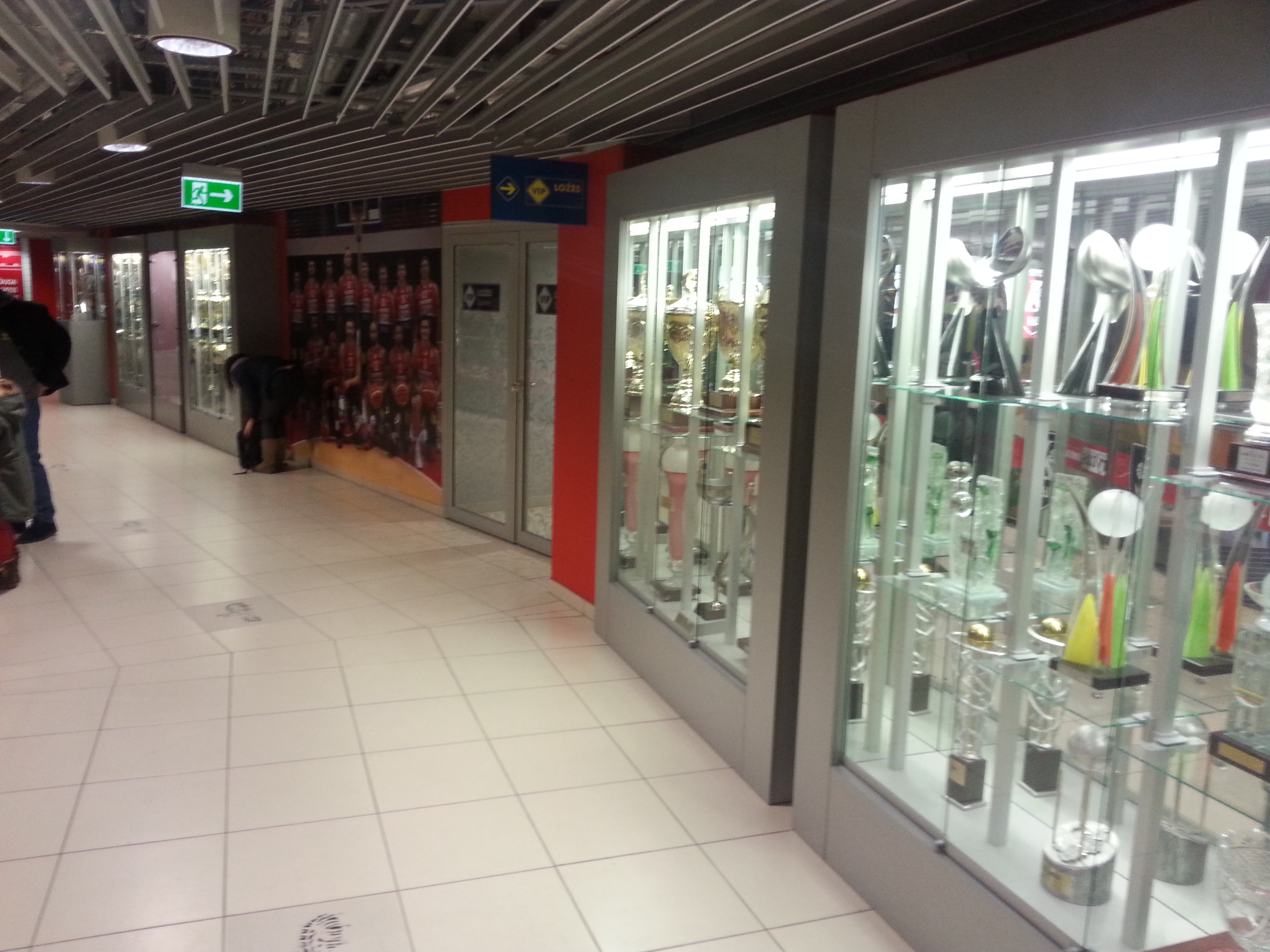
Trophies won by BC Rytas

The history of BC Rytas begins from the founding of the club with a name BC Statyba in 1963, in Lithuania's capital city Vilnius. The BC Statyba was renamed to BC Statyba-Lietuvos rytas in 1997, when Gedvydas Vainauskas, the owner of the daily newspaper Lietuvos rytas, had purchased the club, and in 1998, the old name Statyba was removed completely when the club was renamed to BC Lietuvos rytas. The final name change of the club to BC Rytas occurred in 2018, when its owners has changed and Gedvydas Vainauskas left the club, therefore the new owners of the club sought to remove the affiliation of the club with the newspaper Lietuvos rytas, however the club was domestically and internationally well known as Rytas, thus its name remained similar.

Domestically BC Rytas is known for its long-term rivalry in the Lietuvos krepšinio lyga (Lithuanian Basketball League) with the BC Žalgiris of Kaunas, the second largest Lithuanian city. The BC Rytas is the only Lithuanian men's basketball club other than BC Žalgiris which managed to win the Lithuanian Basketball League since its foundation in 1993. Six out of seven BC Rytas titles of the Lithuanian Basketball League (2000, 2002, 2006, 2009, 2010, 2024) were achieved in victorious LKL Finals against the BC Žalgiris and one against the BC Lietkabelis of Panevėžys in 2022. Moreover, the BC Rytas won three LKF Cup titles (1998, 2009, 2010) and two King Mindaugas Cup titles (2016, 2019) where it also competed against BC Žalgiris.

The BC Rytas throughout its history has achieved success internationally as it had won two EuroCup Basketball titles in 2005 and 2009, and was the 2nd Lithuanian men's basketball club to compete in the EuroLeague, the top-tier men's league in Europe, in which only two other Lithuanian men's basketball clubs competed (BC Žalgiris and BC Neptūnas). The BC Rytas had debuted in the EuroLeague during the 2005–06 season and in total participated in six EuroLeague seasons. Furthermore, the BC Rytas also had won once the North European Basketball League (2001–02 season) and three Baltic Basketball League Elite Division titles (2006, 2007, 2009). On 21 October 2008, the BC Rytas became only the second Lithuanian men's basketball club (after BC Žalgiris) to play against a National Basketball Association team when a friendly game was held against the Golden State Warriors at Oracle Arena in Oakland, California (the Warriors had won the game 126–106).

== Origins (1963–1997) ==
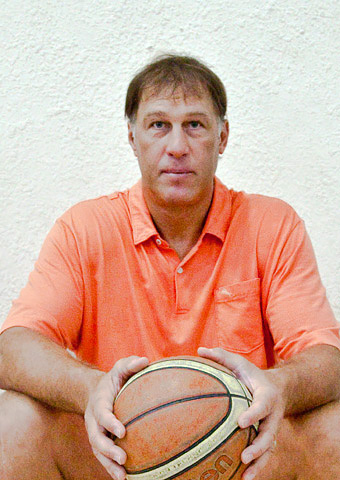
Hall of fame Šarūnas Marčiulionis led BC Statyba from 1981 to 1989.

In 1963, the first basketball team from Vilnius, called Žalgiris, was formed. The following year it changed its name to Plastikas. In that same year, 1964, Plastikas players joined a new team, called Statyba. This name was used for over 30 years.

Jonas Kazlauskas, Rimas Girskis, and then-head coach Rimantas Endrijaitis led Statyba to third place in the 1979, Soviet Union Championship. Three years later, Šarūnas Marčiulionis joined the team and became its leader. In 1987, Artūras Karnišovas joined the team at the age of 16. In 1994, Statyba won bronze medals in their first LKL season.

In 1995, Lietuvos rytas began sponsoring Sūduva Marijampolė, a basketball club from Marijampolė, Lithuania. The partnership lasted for two seasons, during which the team was known as Lietuvos rytas Marijampolė and played in the second-tier Lithuanian league, the LKAL. A notable player for the team was teenager Darius Songaila. However, after the 1996–97 season the partnership ended.

At the same time, Statyba was faced with financial difficulties and was on the verge of bankruptcy. The team needed new investors and in 1997, Lietuvos rytas bought the club. However, the new owners did not want to continue the team's history and renamed it Statyba-Lietuvos rytas, then just Lietuvos rytas. The newspaper's investment helped the club to establish itself as one of the two best in Lithuania, the other being Žalgiris from the country's second-largest city Kaunas.

== First successes (1997–2004) ==
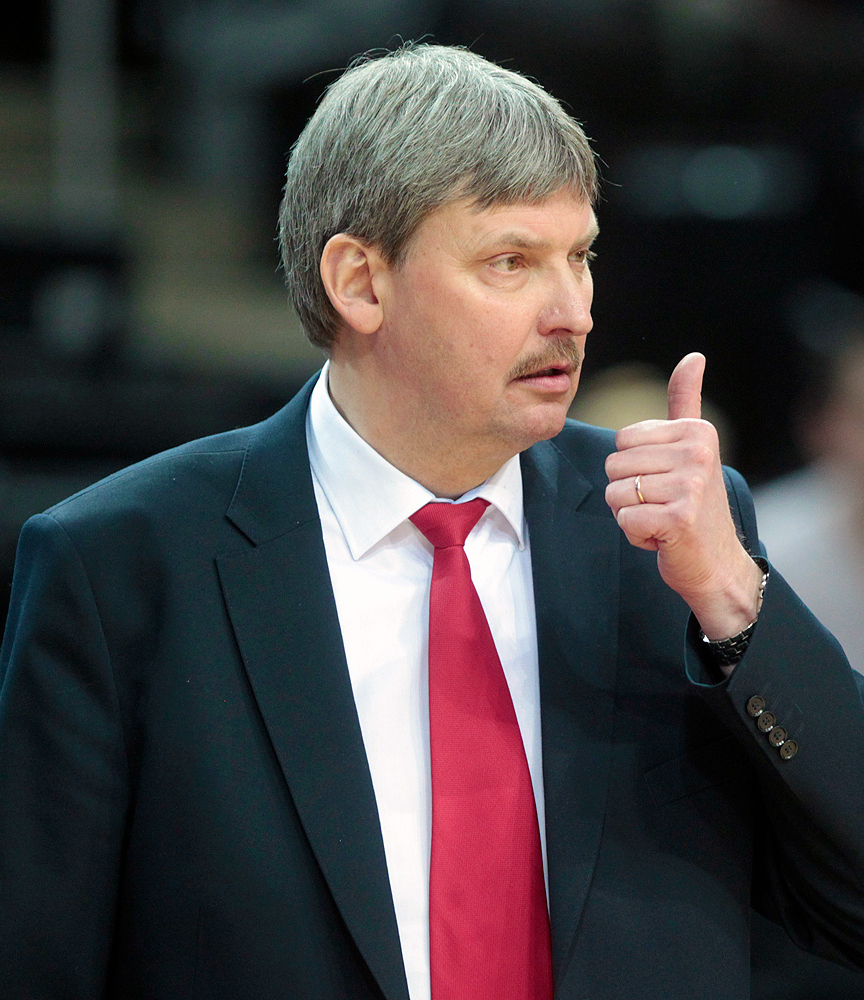
Alfredas Vainauskas, coach of the team 1997–2001

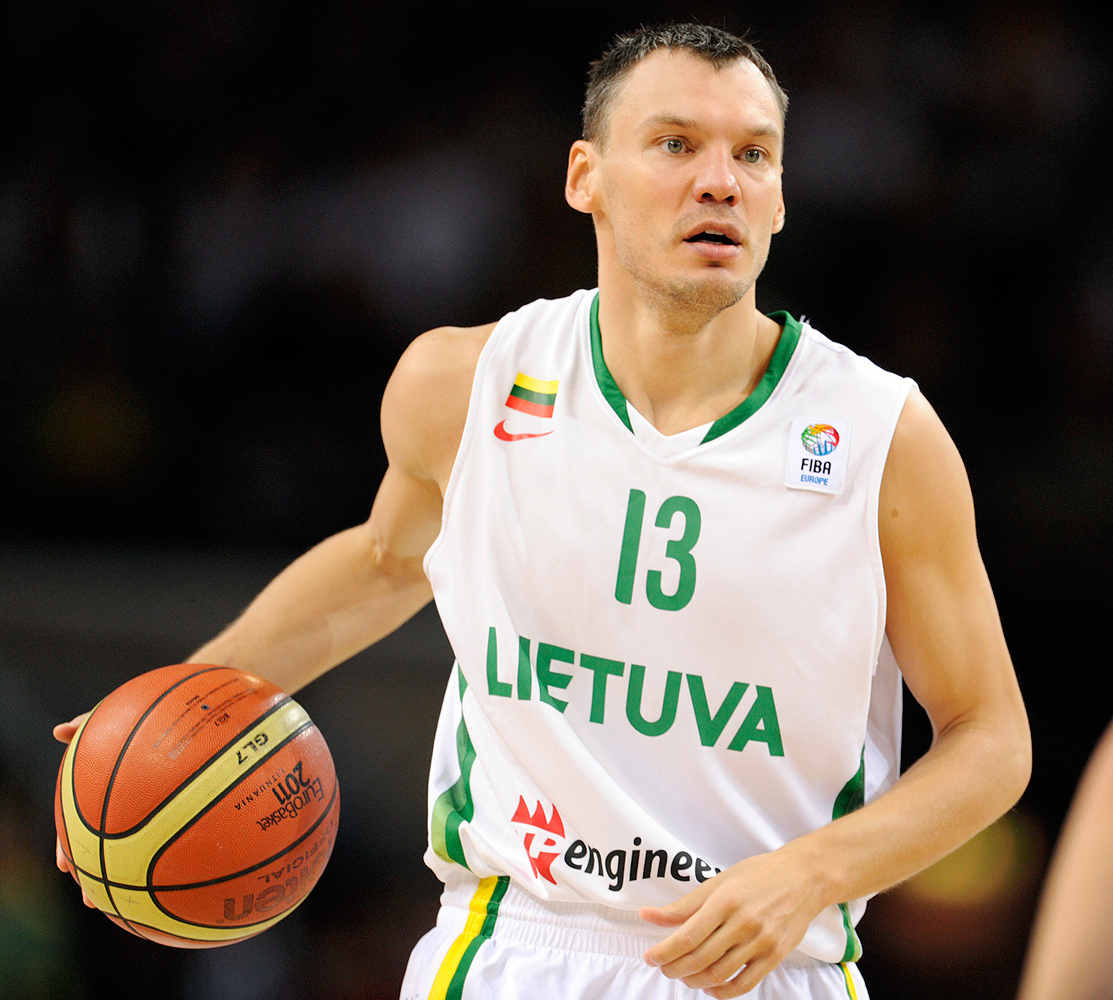
Lithuanian star Šarūnas Jasikevičius started his career in Lietuvos rytas.

During its first season, BC Rytas won a bronze medal in the LKL. In the following season, Rytas won LKL silver, losing to reigning EuroLeague champions Žalgiris Kaunas. The team also took second place in 1997, William Jones Cup.

In 2000, Ramūnas Šiškauskas, Andrius Giedraitis and Eric Elliott, combined with Arvydas Macijauskas and Robertas Javtokas, managed to win LKL. The team was coached by Šarūnas Sakalauskas. It was the first time in the history of the Lithuanian Basketball League that Žalgiris Kaunas did not win the LKL title. Also, Rytas reached the Saporta Cup semifinal, where they met last season's EuroLeague runner-up Kinder. After a home win of 70–60, Lietuvos rytas lost in Italy 83–71, with Šiškauskas missing a three-pointer which would have won the two-game series for his team.

The next season, due to the split between the FIBA and ULEB, Rytas played in the FIBA SuproLeague, making it to the quarterfinals, but losing to Anadolu Efes S.K. The team won third place in the NEBL. In the LKL finals, Žalgiris Kaunas defeated Lietuvos rytas in a tough five-game series 3–2.

In 2002, Lietuvos rytas won the LKL again, this time in a seven-game final series with the last game decided in overtime. The team played without center Robertas Javtokas, who was seriously injured in a motorbike crash. Lietuvos rytas also won the NEBL title in 2002, becoming the last team to win the tournament. The team held first place in the group stage of the Saporta Cup but lost in the quarterfinals to Hapoel Jerusalem.

Over the next two seasons, Lietuvos rytas lost in the LKL finals to Žalgiris Kaunas. They had more success in Europe, though, finishing in second place in the FIBA Champions Cup regional stage (though losing to Hemofarm Vršac in the final stage). The team also debuted in the ULEB Cup, getting to the quarterfinals but losing to Hapoel Jerusalem.

== Success in the ULEB Cup and Euroleague (2004–2008) ==
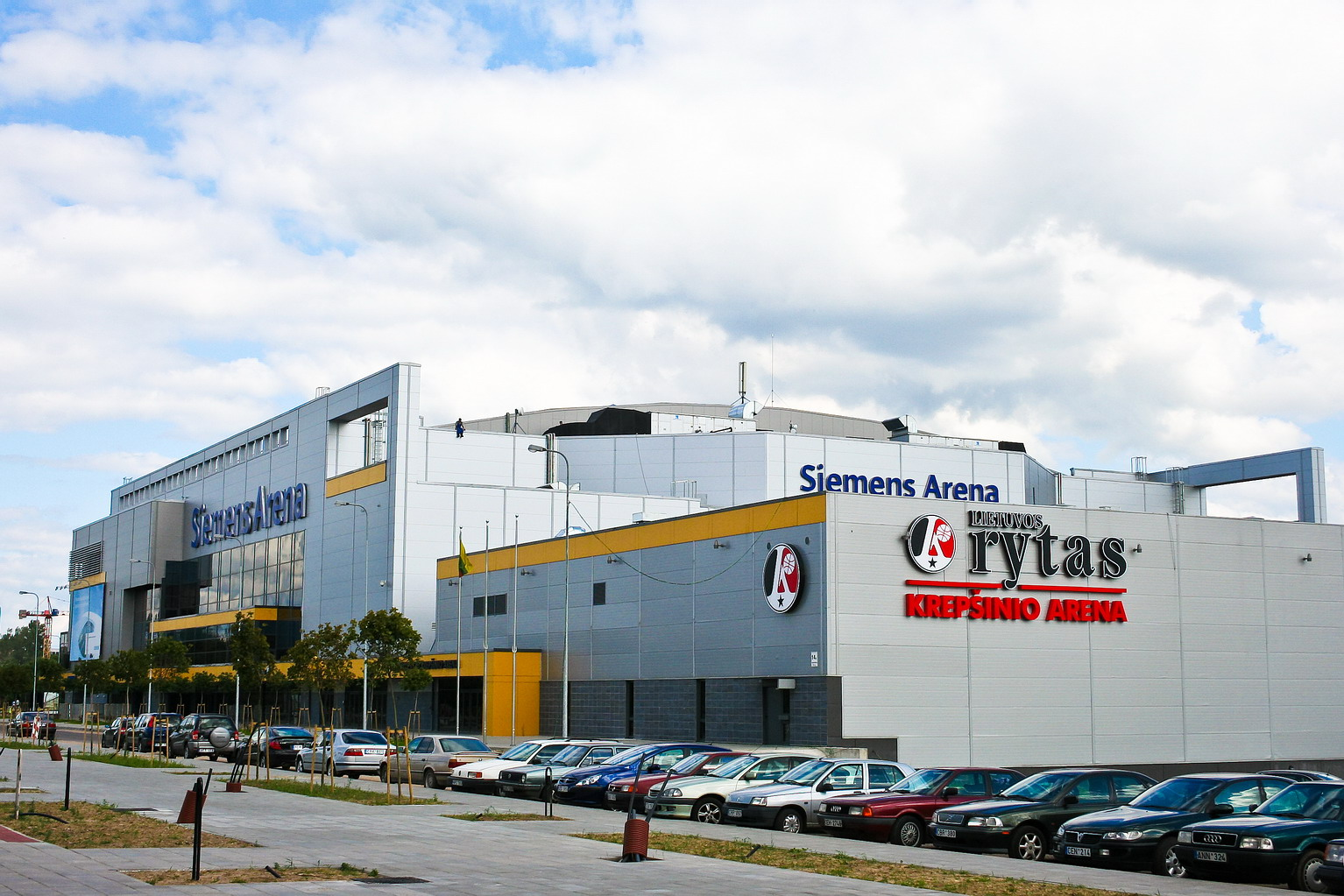
Lietuvos rytas and Siemens arenas, opened 2004

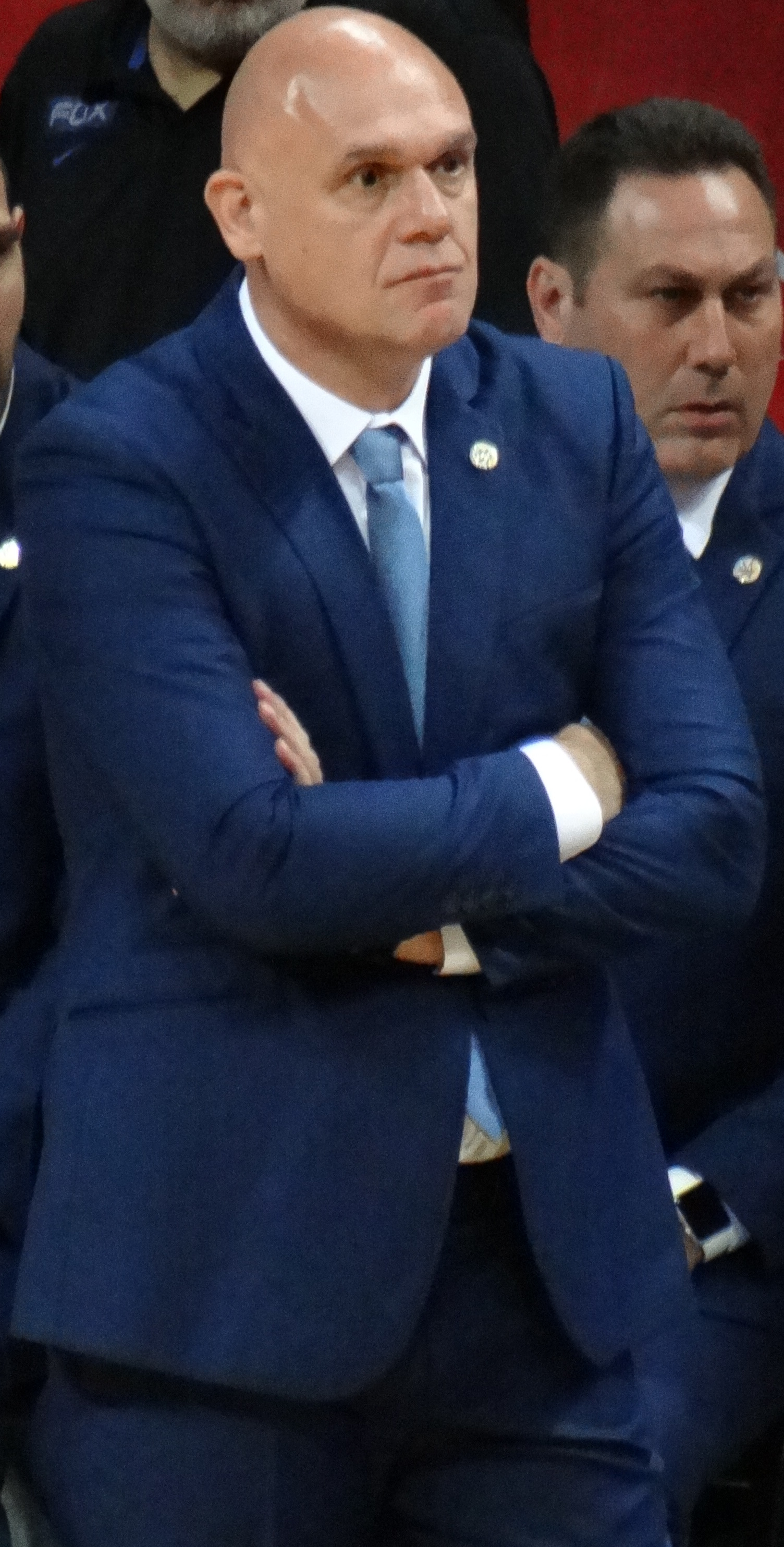
Neven Spahija, coach for the 2005–06 season

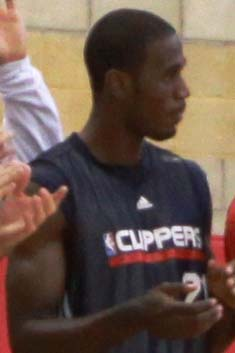
Kareem Rush, leader for the second half of 2006–07 season

The Lietuvos rytas' lineup in 2007

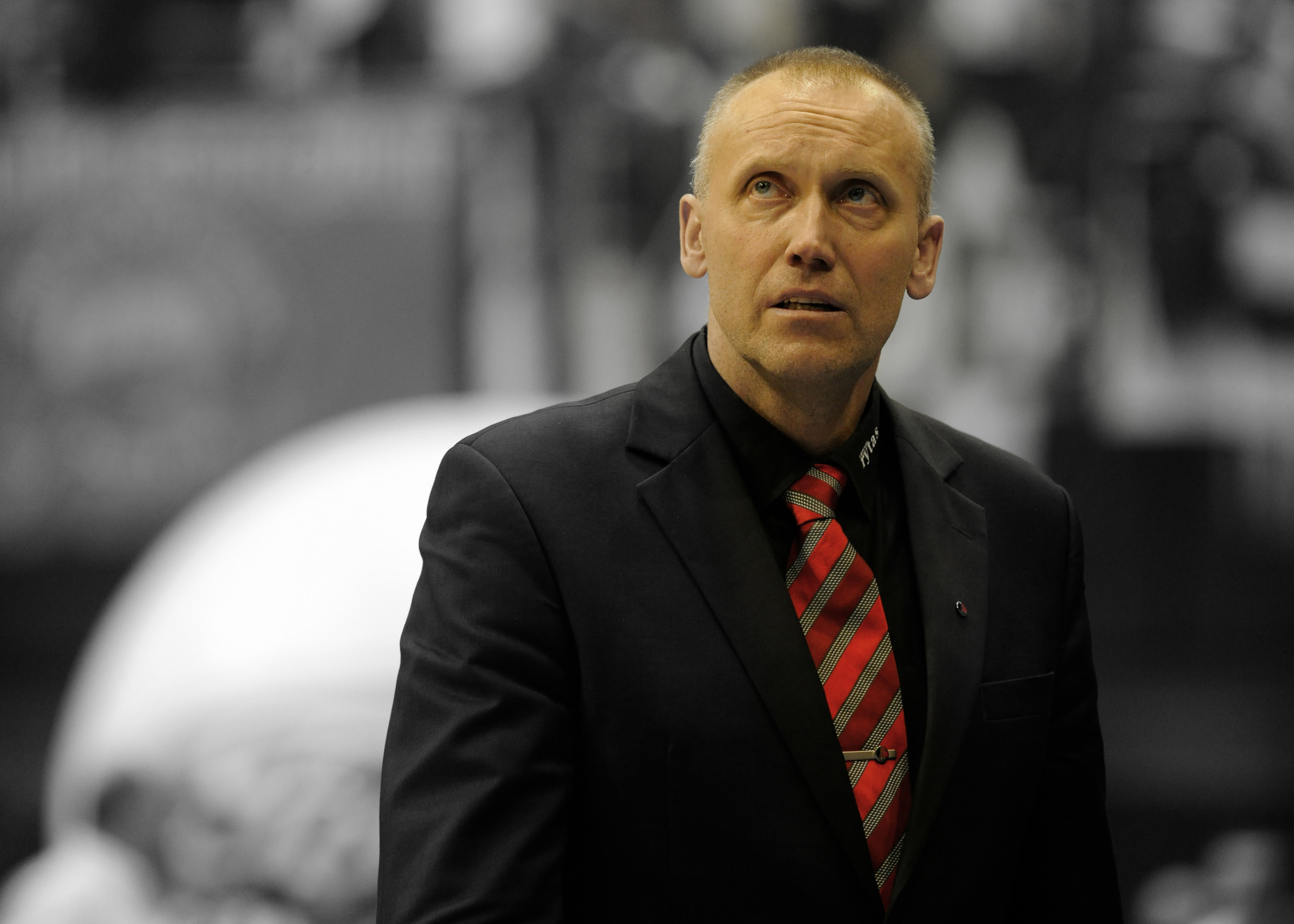
Rimas Kurtinaitis

=== 2004–05: ULEB Cup champions ===
After not winning any titles in the past two seasons, Lietuvos rytas recruited Vlade Đurović as a new coach. Midway through the season, Frederick House, the team leader, suffered a season-ending injury. Đurović later resigned and was replaced by Tomo Mahorič. Tyrone Nesby, Roberts Štelmahers and Robertas Javtokas, Simas Jasaitis and Tomas Delininkaitis led the team to victory in the 2005 ULEB Cup, beating Pamesa Valencia in the semifinals and Makedonikos in the final. This victory granted them a place in the EuroLeague, the continent's primary basketball club tournament. Lietuvos rytas won second place in both the LKL and BBL finals, losing to Žalgiris Kaunas.

=== 2005–06: EuroLeague debut ===
Before the 2005–06 season, Neven Spahija became the head coach of the team. After losing their first two matches, Lietuvos rytas matched the EuroLeague record by winning seven consecutive EuroLeague fixtures, defeating as FC Barcelona, champions Maccabi Tel Aviv (twice) and Efes Pilsen Istanbul. Those wins allowed Rytas to advance to the Top 16 phase, where they won three times out of six, beating Tau Ceramica Vitoria once and Brose Baskets Bamberg twice. However, Lietuvos rytas was eliminated from that year's EuroLeague.

After winning the Baltic Basketball League title, Lietuvos rytas defeated Žalgiris Kaunas 4–0. Despite winning the Lithuanian title, Lietuvos rytas did not acquire the country's spot for 2006–07 EuroLeague that was reserved for Žalgiris Kaunas.

=== 2006–07: ULEB Cup finalists ===
Although the coach and three leading players Robertas Javtokas, Simas Jasaitis and Fred House had left the team during the interseason, the 2006–07 ULEB Cup season was rather successful for Lietuvos rytas. Two coaches were replaced during the season: Sharon Drucker from Israel was replaced by Slovenian Zmago Sagadin and the latter by his assistant coach Aleksandar Trifunović from Serbia. NBA player Kareem Rush arrived to lead the team to the ULEB Cup final where Real Madrid defeated Lietuvos rytas. However, Real Madrid's victory at the ACB semifinals, and of one of four spots reserved for Spain, allowed Lietuvos rytas to take part in the 2007–08 EuroLeague as the ULEB Cup finalist. On 27 April 2007, Lietuvos rytas won their second consecutive BBL title; Kareem Rush was named the Final Four MVP. The LKL finals and LKF Cup finals were both unsuccessful, though, as Žalgiris Kaunas won both tournaments.

=== 2007–08: Back to EuroLeague ===
Lietuvos rytas had a successful season during 2007–08 EuroLeague, defeating Unicaja Málaga and Armani Jeans Milano. Lietuvos rytas defeated Maccabi Tel Aviv, the future EuroLeague finalist. On 1 November, Lietuvos rytas defeated Maccabi by 18 points at home for a third time in a row as Artūras Jomantas led the team with 19 points and became the week's co-MVP with Erazem Lorbek, both having performance index ratings of 29. Hollis Price (19 points) and Chuck Eidson (28 points) played a major role in scoring the fourth victory in a row against Maccabi (away, by 5 points).

Lietuvos rytas completed a road victory against Cibona Zagreb on 31 January 2008, which completed the Euroleague regular season for them allowed them to remain in the first spot in the Group B securing a favorable position in the first pool before the Top 16 draw together with CSKA Moscow, Real Madrid and Panathinaikos Athens. Their 11–3 record was the team's best regular season performance ever, and the best by a Lithuanian team in Euroleague at the time. However, the team was not as successful in the Top 16 and with record of 2–4 did not advance to the playoffs.

Lietuvos rytas were the runner-up in the Lithuanian Basketball League, the Baltic Basketball League and the Lithuanian Cup, losing each time to Žalgiris Kaunas.

== Rimas Kurtinaitis era (2008–2010) ==
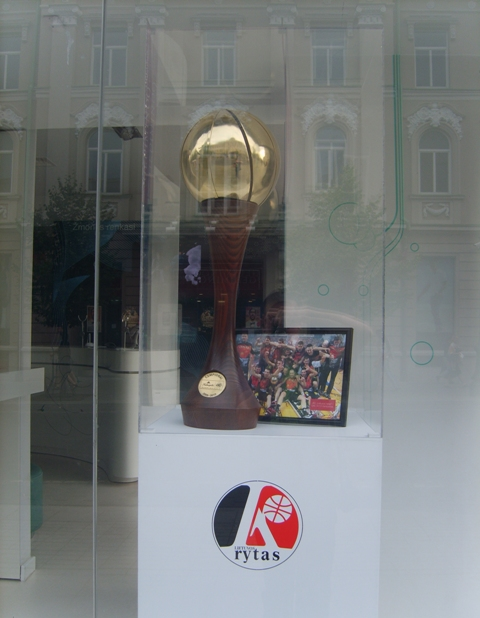
LKL trophy in Vilnius

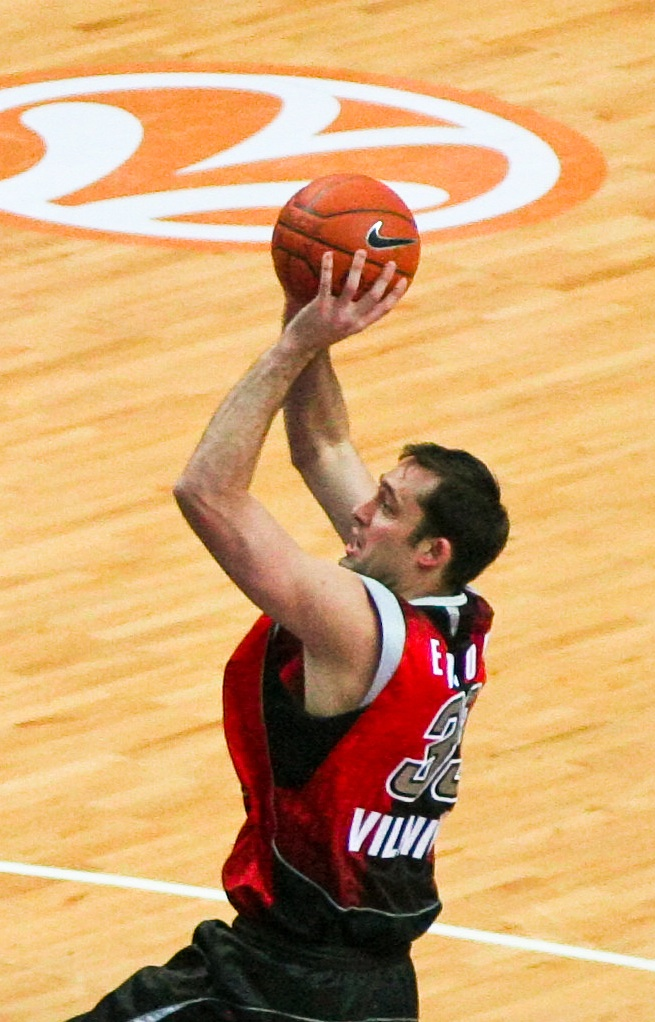
Chuck Eidson, the leader of the team for the 2008–09 season

During The 2008–09 season, Lietuvos rytas had a significantly lower budget. Also, they put a greater emphasis on prospective local players. Lietuvos rytas won the first Baltic Basketball Presidents Cup during this season. On 21 October 2008, Lietuvos rytas had its first chance to play against an NBA basketball club the Golden State Warriors at Oracle Arena. Lietuvos rytas lost the game 126–106.

Lietuvos rytas was affected by the 2008 financial crisis in late 2008 and early 2009. Even if they lost two of its leading foreign players, Lietuvos rytas still managed to reach the second phase of EuroCup, finishing second in their group with three home wins and three away losses. Head coach Antanas Sireika resigned and was replaced by Rimas Kurtinaitis, a former Lietuvos rytas player, for the second half of the season. The team started the second phase of the EuroCup with only two foreign players, Chuck Eidson (a teammate of Petravičius at South Carolina) and Milko Bjelica. Several Lithuanian basketball players joined the team's roster, and Rytas successfully advanced to the Final 8. Chuck Eidson was named the regular season MVP.

The Final 8 began with a victory against Benetton Treviso in the quarterfinal on 2 April 2009. Two days later the team won its semifinal against Hemofarm Vršac and made its third consecutive appearance in the EuroCup finals. Mindaugas Lukauskis has made a decisive three-pointer which allowed him to become the only player to participate in the final three times in total and, later, the only two-time EuroCup champion. Going into the finals, Rytas was considered an underdog against BC Khimki of Russia. However, the performances of Steponas Babrauskas (18 points) and Marijonas Petravičius (20 points) allowed the team to win the final. Lietuvos rytas made a 15–0 run, having left their rivals scoreless for six straight minutes in the third and fourth quarters. Rytas became the first team to reclaim the EuroCup title; Marijonas Petravičius was selected the Final 8 MVP.

Lietuvos rytas was also successful in matches against arch rival Žalgiris Kaunas. It won the 2009 LKF Cup, with Mindaugas Lukauskis scoring the game-winning three pointer with 2 seconds left. Lietuvois rytas also won the Baltic Basketball League final game on 25 April 2009 over Žalgiris Kaunas, 97–74. Chuck Eidson scored 41 points, and he was the MVP for the season. It was the third BBL title for the club. Lietuvos rytas won a trophy for winning the Lithuanian Basketball League (LKL) during this season as well. Having qualified in the finals, Lietuvos rytas had a match against Žalgiris Kaunas during the finals and won the series 4–1, with the final match taking place on 18 May. This was the fourth time Lietuvos rytas became the LKL champion, and it was the fifth trophy of the season for the team.

After the season, team leaders Marijonas Petravičius, Mindaugas Lukauskis and Chuck Eidson left and Lietuvos rytas acquired new prospective players to replace them. The team began their 2009–10 season with a loss to their rival Žalgiris Kaunas 83–78 in the BBL Cup finals. Lietuvos rytas also participated in the 2009 Gomelsky Cup, where the team claimed third place after a near-loss game against Triumph Lyubertsy 94–90.

Lietuvos rytas was not as successful in the 2009–10 EuroLeague as before—they lost the deciding game against Unicaja Málaga, took fifth place in Group B and did not advance to the Top 16. However, their rivalry with Žalgiris Kaunas continued. After winning the LKF Cup 77–65, Lietuvos rytas had problems with player injuries and suffered a loss in the BBL Finals to their rivals from Kaunas, 73–66. However, Lietuvos rytas won the LKL trophy, beating Žalgiris Kaunas 4–3. It was the second consecutive LKL title for the Vilnius team. After the conclusion of the season, head coach Rimas Kurtinaitis left the club to be replaced by Dražen Anzulović.

== Big dreams, small achievements (2010–2014) ==
=== 2010–11: Fourth season in the Euroleague ===
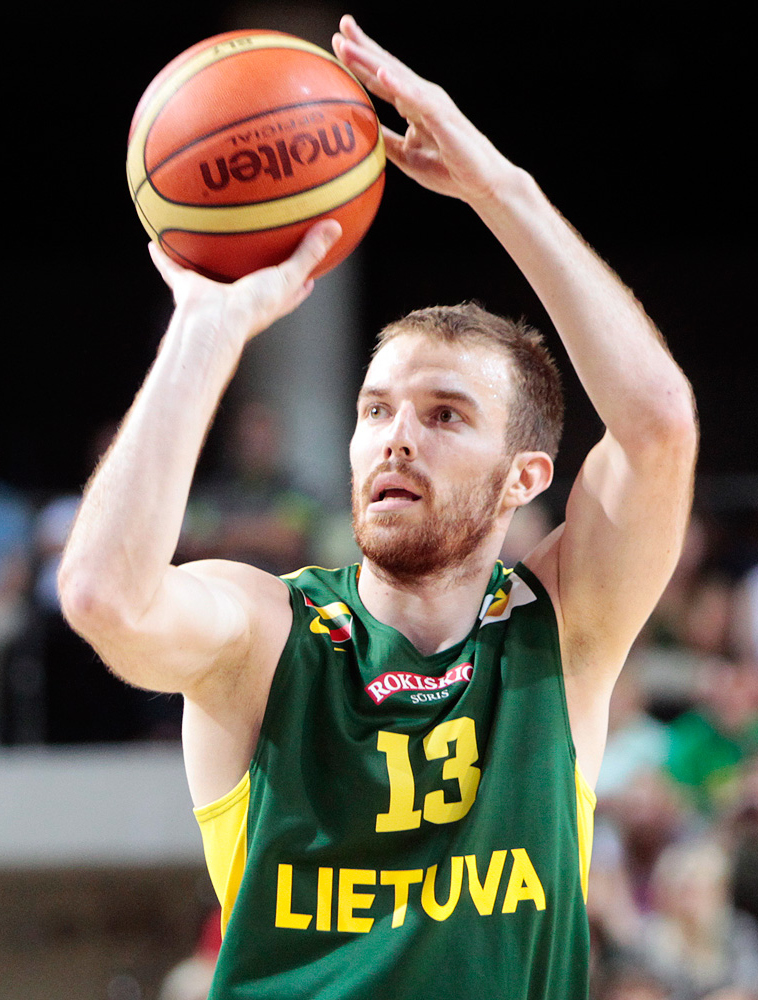
Martynas Gecevičius was the team leader for the 2010–11 season.

The 2010–11 EuroLeague season Lietuvos rytas' fourth season. After an unsuccessful start of the season, Dražen Anzulović was replaced by the team's former coach Aleksandar Trifunović. With an overall record of 0–4 in their Group C, the team signed a former team member and free agent Šarūnas Jasikevičius. After winning three last EuroLeague group phase games, Rytas qualified for the Top 16 stage in the fourth berth during their last games. On New Year's Eve, Jasikevičius was replaced by Simas Jasaitis, a former member of the team and also a free agent. Rytas lost the LKF Cup final to Žalgiris Kaunas 81–69.

The Top 16 phase was the most successful of its three attempts for the team. Playing in the Group E in EuroLeague, Lietuvos rytas defeated Caja Laboral at home, Panathinaikos Athens and Unicaja Málaga on the road. The last round remaining, the team had a chance to finish first in their Top 16 E group. However, Lietuvos rytas lost to Caja Laboral and took third place in the group. Their ninth-place finish in EuroLeague is the highest achievement for the team in this tournament in club history.

However, Rytas lost in the semifinals at the Baltic Basketball League, to VEF Rīga and finished in third place for the first time in club history. Head coach Trifunović was fired and replaced by assistant coach Darius Maskoliūnas. The team's game improved, but Rytas still lost the LKL finals to Žalgiris.

=== 2011–12: EuroCup Final Four ===
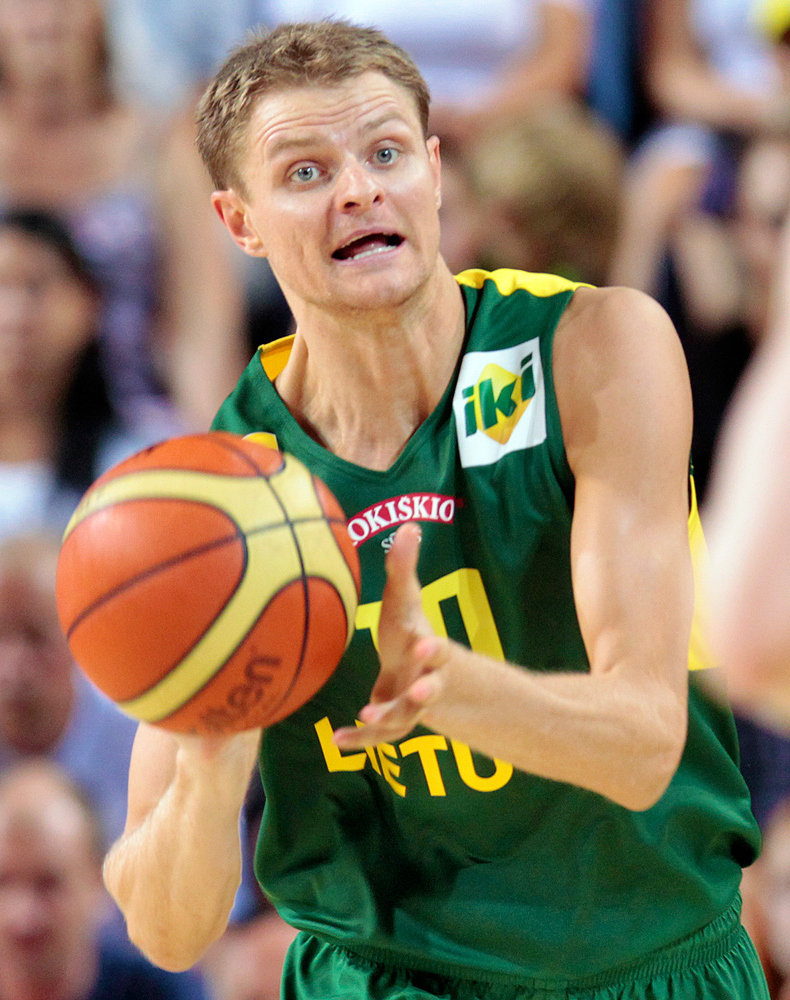
Renaldas Seibutis became the new team leader in the 2011–12 season.

After dismissing Milko Bjelica, Kenan Bajramović, D. J. Strawberry, Cemal Nalga and losing team leader Martynas Gecevičius, Lietuvos rytas replaced eight players. The beginning of the season was not very successful as Lietuvos rytas did not win EuroLeague's qualification tournament, which was organized in Vilnius. Lietuvos rytas won their first two matches against Budućnost Podgorica and Cibona Zagreb, but lost the final game against Galatasaray by a score of 71–63. As a result, Lietuvos rytas had to play at the second-tier European competition, EuroCup. The team, led by Renaldas Seibutis, Jonas Valančiūnas and Tyrese Rice, made it to the quarterfinal round for the fifth time in a row and defeated BC Donetsk, qualifying to the 2012 Eurocup Basketball Final Four, but lost to Valencia Basket 80–70 in the semifinals. Rytas finished third after a 71–62 win against Spartak St. Petersburg.

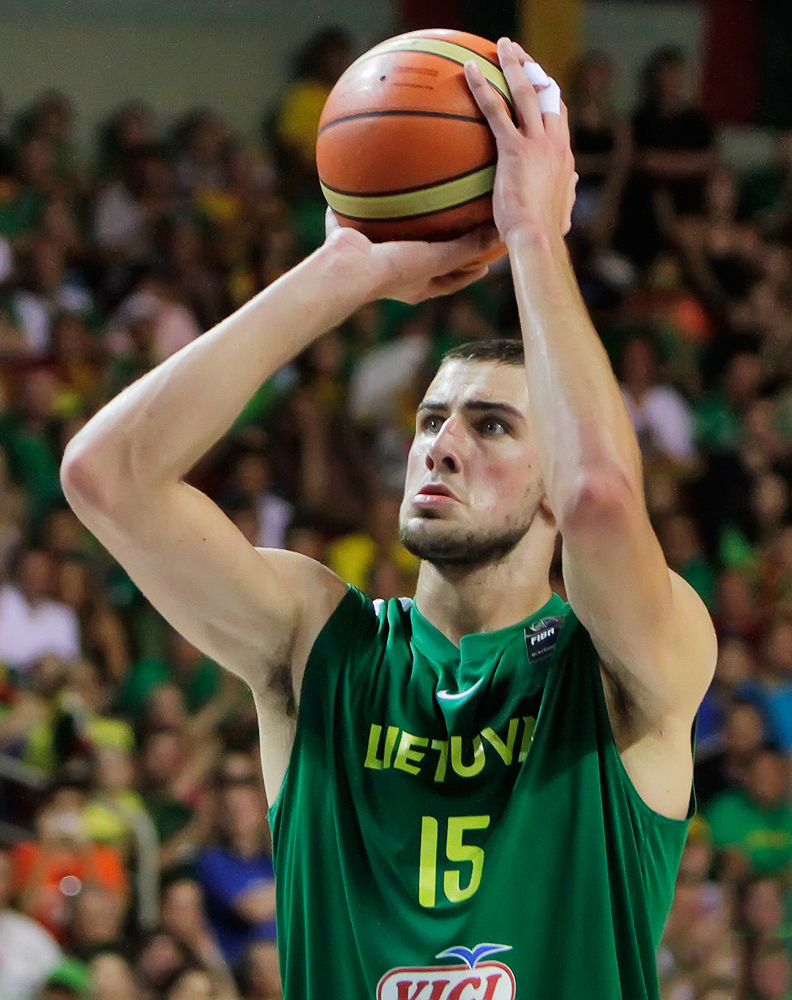
Jonas Valančiūnas spent his first seasons in Lietuvos rytas's system.

The team finished third in the regular season round of the VTB United League and qualified for the eighth final. They defeated Nizhny Novgorod and advanced to the quarterfinals where they met Khimki. Khimki were the reigning EuroCup and VTB League champions and were considered heavy favorites but Rytas unexpectedly won the series 2–1. The Final Four tournament was organized at Siemens Arena. After a tense semifinal, Lietuvos rytas lost to CSKA Moscow 79–72, but went on to win third place against Lokomotiv-Kuban 91–83.

Despite two third places in international competitions, Rytas lost the LKL final series to Žalgiris Kaunas, with Žalgiris winning 3–0. This was the worst domestic season in the team's history; Rytas lost all six of its matches (five in LKL and the BBL finals) to its rival. Following the conclusion of the season, Tyrese Rice, Lawrence Roberts, Aleksandar Rašić and Jonas Valančiūnas left the team.

=== 2012–13 ===
After losing most of their leaders during the summer, Rytas formed a younger squad. Players like Nemanja Nedović were expected to be the future of the team. However, the season was not very successful. Rytas lost the Lithuanian Supercup to Žalgiris Kaunas. After struggling in the opening months, Lietuvos rytas fired coach Aleksandar Džikić, promoting Darius Maskoliūnas as head coach. Though the game had improved, thanks to Leon Radošević, Renaldas Seibutis and Nemanja Nedović, the EuroLeague season was finished with a 2–8 record. The team did not fare much better in the VTB United League. After Leon Radošević and Predrag Samardžiski were released, Rytas signed Milt Palacio, Tomislav Zubčić and Patrick O'Bryant. The rookies were not much help, however, and Rytas still missed the VTB playoffs, with Donetsk defeating Rytas in the deciding game. Coach Maskoliūnas was fired and replaced by Dirk Bauermann. Rytas began to play much better, and in April scored an away win over Žalgiris Kaunas—the first in almost two years. Rytas made the LKL finals for the 15th time in a row. However, Žalgiris Kaunas easily swept Lietuvos rytas 4–0 in the final.

=== 2013–14: Downfall of Lietuvos rytas ===
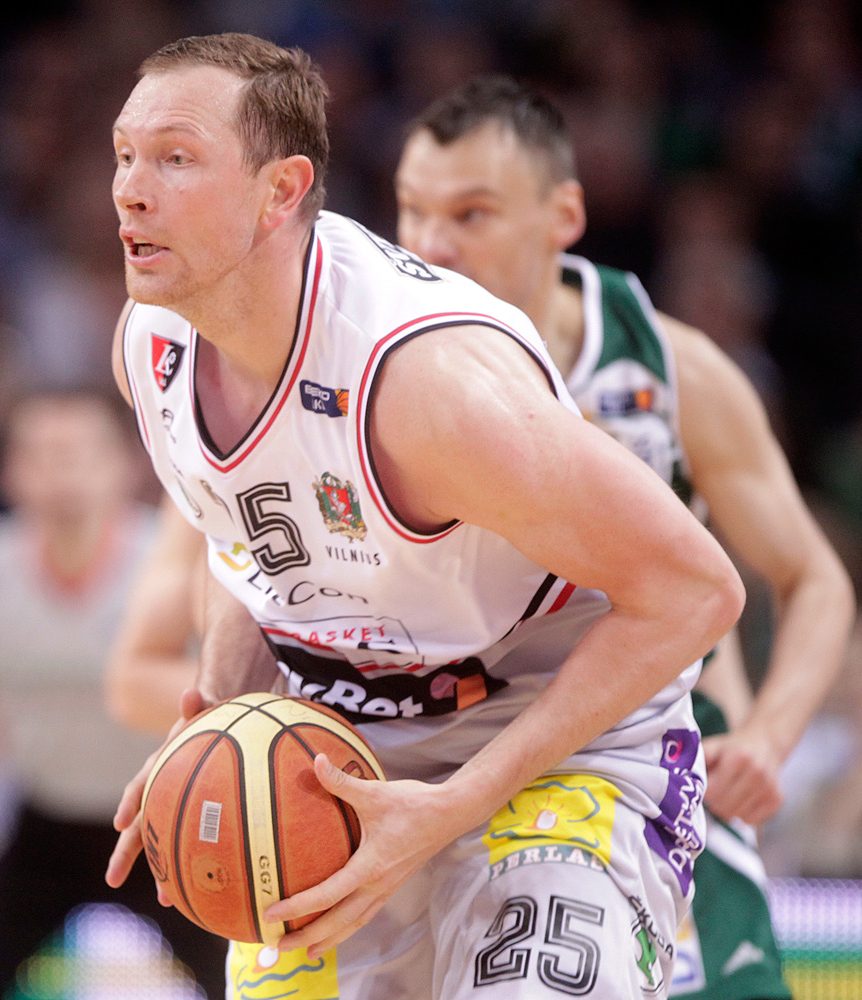
Rytas became the first club in Lithuania for veteran Darius Songaila.

Due to the unsuccessful past season, the manager decided to almost completely rebuild the team: eight players left after the team lost the LKL finals to Žalgiris Kaunas, its rival. Former team leader Martynas Gecevičius was recalled after a two-season break and a notable point guard Omar Cook was signed. Because the team was second in the domestic league, it had to hope for a EuroLeague wild card. The team did not receive it, and had to participate in EuroLeague's qualification tournament once again, which was held in Vilnius.

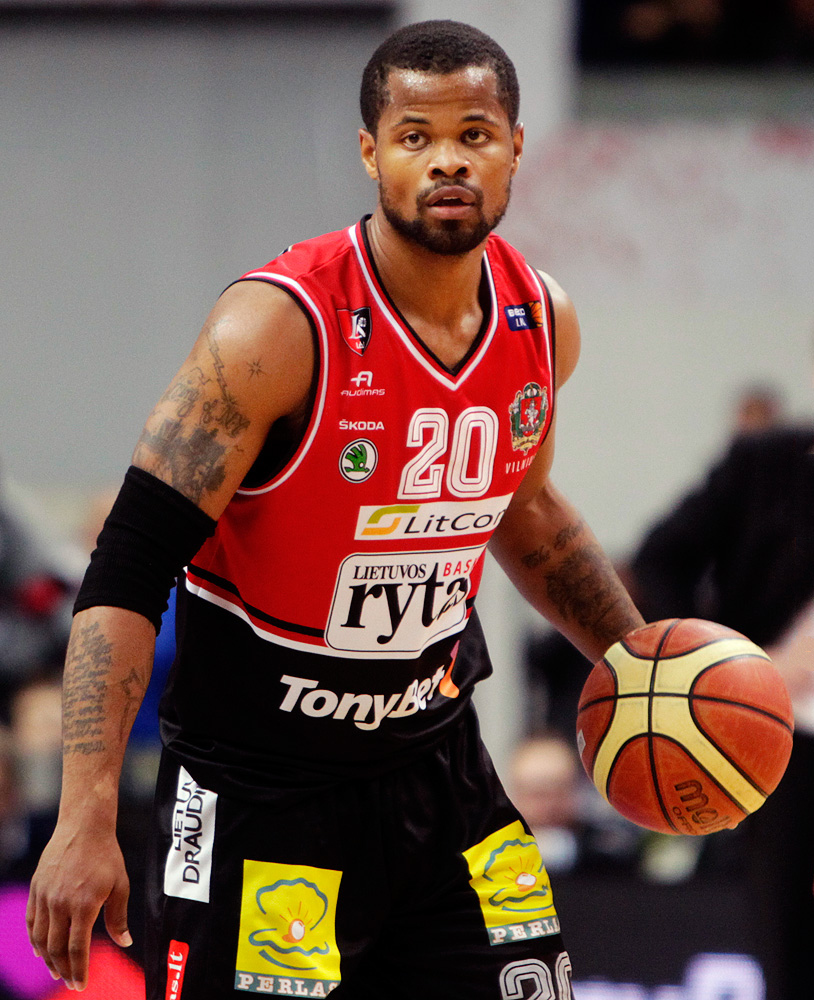
Notable point guard Omar Cook was signed for the 2013–14 season.

This time, Rytas, led by Renaldas Seibutis and Martynas Gecevičius, was successful—it won three games in a row (against VEF Rīga, EWE Oldenburg and Telenet Oostende), and qualified for the EuroLeague. To strengthen the team roster before the EuroLeague games, Lietuvos rytas signed former NBA and Lithuania national team player Darius Songaila. On 18 October 2013, Lietuvos rytas started the 2013–14 EuroLeague season with an 84–83 victory against Panathinaikos Athens after Renaldas Seibutis's winning shot in overtime. The game was selected as EuroLeague's Game of the Week and re-broadcast in over 150 countries worldwide. However, after this, the team experienced a decline and Rytas was unable to win any more games. Six games were lost by 10 points or more and it ended being the worst Lietuvos rytas season ever in the EuroLeague - a disappointing 1–9 record. After this, coach Dirk Bauermann was fired and replaced by Aleksandar Petrović. The change helped and on 22 December, Rytas crushed its rival Žalgiris Kaunas 90–58. After being eliminated in the EuroCup playoffs by Crvena zvezda Belgrade, Lietuvos rytas also suffered a defeat in the LKF Cup finals - losing to TonyBet Prienai 92–91. This led to the firing of coach Aleksandar Petrović, who was replaced by Dainius Adomaitis.

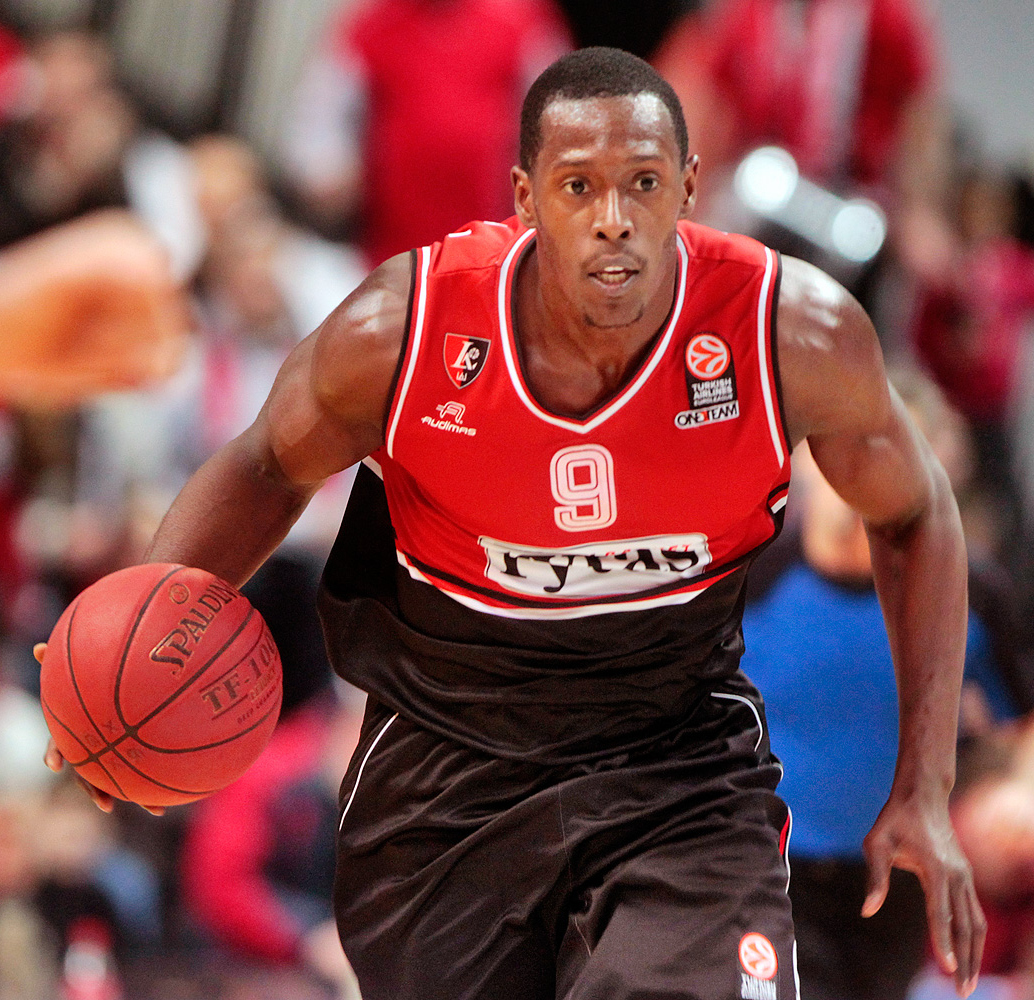
Juan Palacios was one of the team leaders in the 2013–14 season.

Despite two victories against Rytas' biggest rival Žalgiris Kaunas during the regular season, the LKL playoffs were a disaster for Lietuvos rytas. Due to a rare situation in LKL standings, Rytas and Žalgiris Kaunas met in the semifinals and not in the finals for the second time since 1998. Darius Songaila's 28 points led Rytas to a first series victory in Vilnius with 90–85 result. Rytas lost to Žalgiris in Kaunas 72–57 and the series was tied at 1–1. The third game was played in Vilnius. However it was unsuccessful for the home team. Despite having multiple leads, Rytas lost 73–71 to Žalgiris Kaunas and did not qualify to the LKL Finals for the second time in club history; Žalgiris won the series 2–1. Team captain Steponas Babrauskas described it as a "tragedy". Moreover, one of team leaders Renaldas Seibutis injured his eye after contact with Vytenis Lipkevičius and required surgery causing him to miss the rest of the season. The disastrous season continued for Rytas in the VTB playoffs. After defeating Triumph Lyubertsy 3–0 in the first round, Rytas lost to Nizhny Novgorod 1–3 in the semifinals, losing a chance to play in the 2014–15 EuroLeague season. Rytas finished in third place in the LKL, winning the series against TonyBet Prienai 3–0 and winning the bronze medal. This was the team's worst season since 1998–99.

== Tough years in EuroCup and LKL (2014–2017) ==
=== 2014–15: Return to EuroCup ===
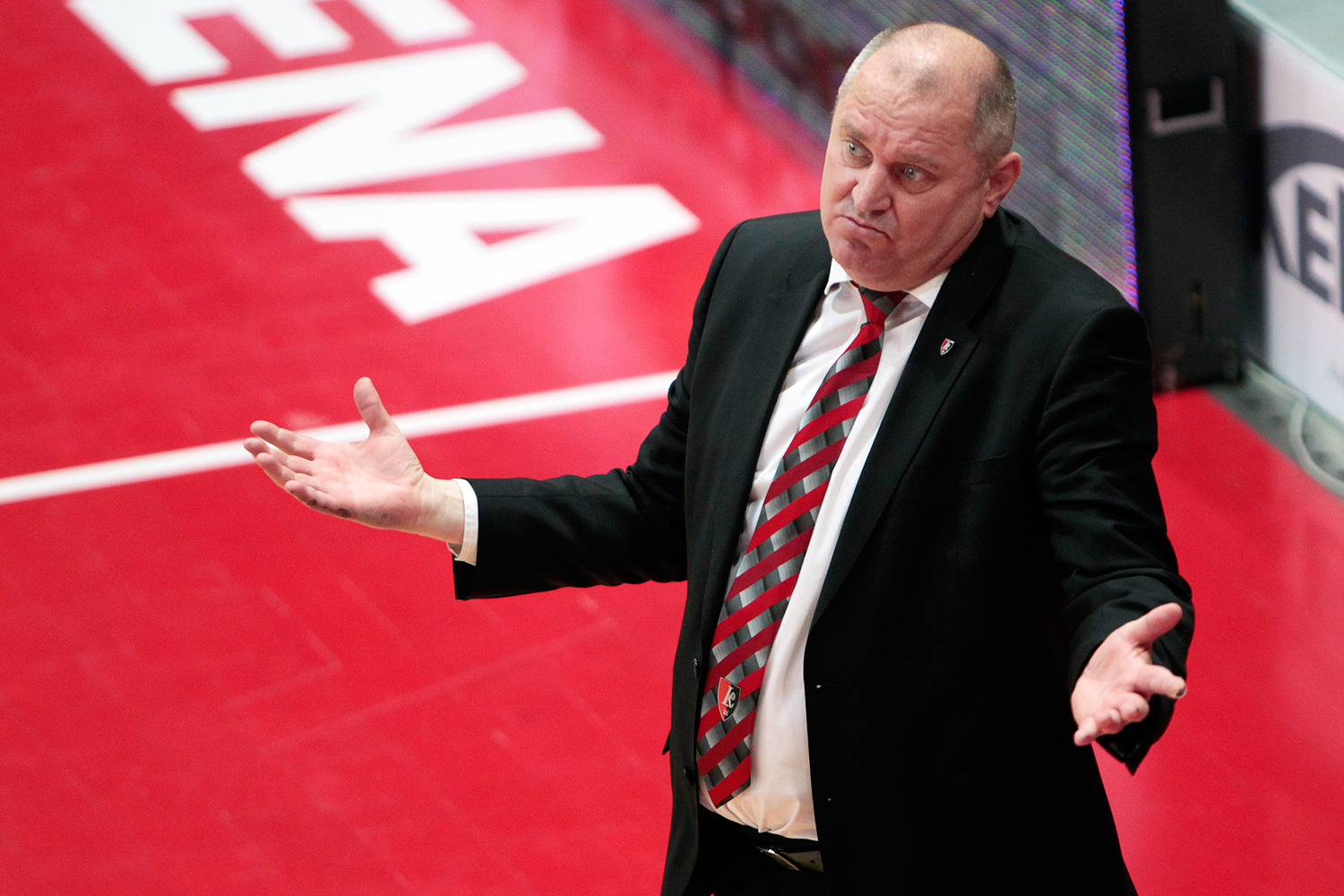
Virginijus Šeškus with Rytas

After an unsuccessful LKL season the previous year, taking only third place, Rytas lost any chance of qualifying for the EuroLeague that year. The team was not invited to the qualifying tournament as before and had to return to the second-tier European league EuroCup. As a result, the club made changes. Renaldas Seibutis, Omar Cook and Darius Songaila left the team. Also, the team played most of its games in the newly reconstructed Lietuvos rytas Arena instead of the Siemens Arena. Thirdly, Rytas withdrew from the Russian VTB League. Virginijus Šeškus, a former multiple LKL bronze medalist with Prienai, was signed as head coach of the team, along with his past team members Artūras Valeika and Mindaugas Lukauskis, who played six seasons in Rytas previously. Club owner Gedvydas Vainauskas said shortly afterward that the enthusiastic Šeškus reminds him of former team coach Rimas Kurtinaitis, who led Rytas to its biggest victories in club history. Lithuania's national team member Adas Juškevičius and former NBA player Travis Leslie were signed in as well.

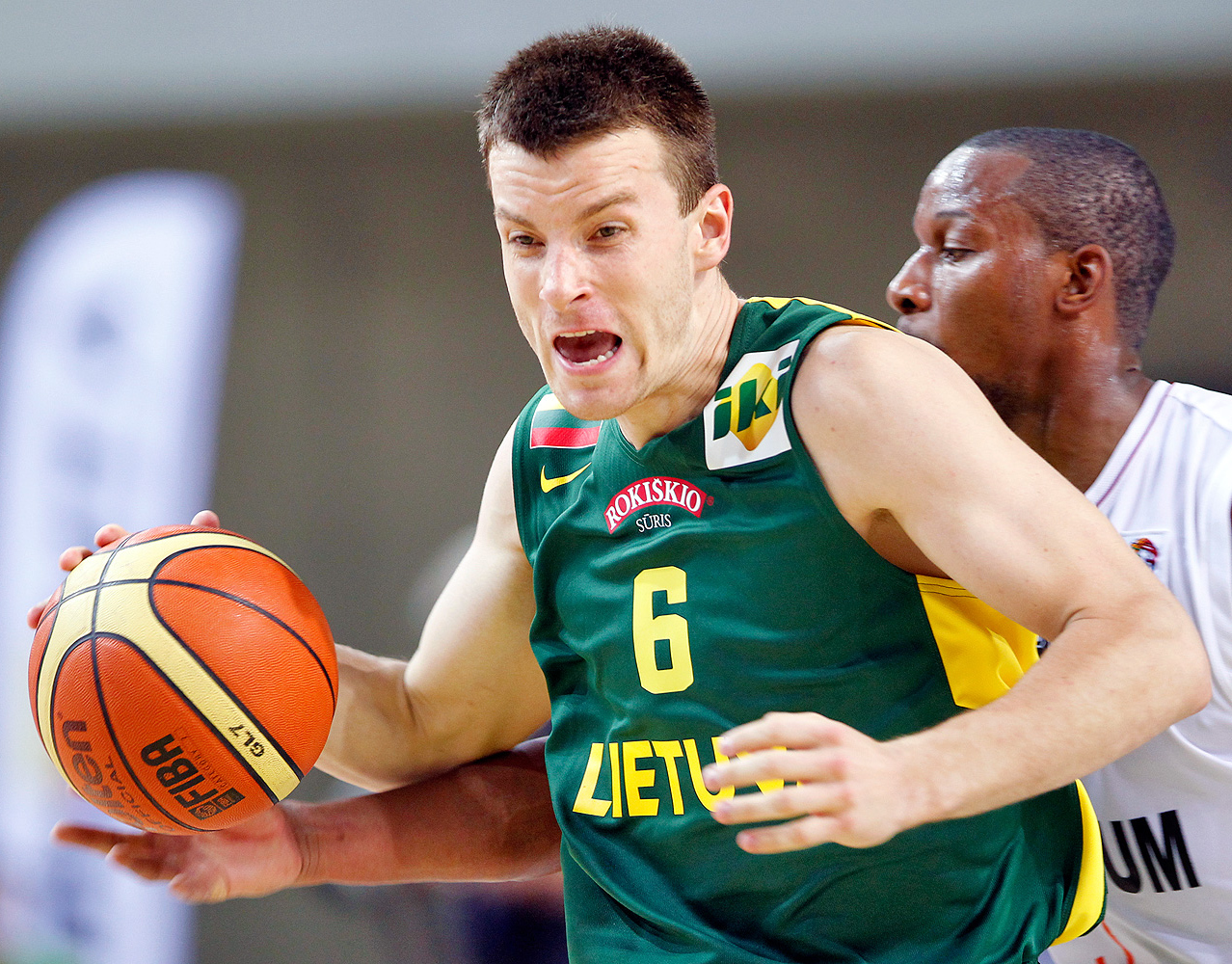
Lithuania national team member Adas Juškevičius joined Rytas in 2014.

On 15 October 2014, Rytas started the EuroCup season with a 92–65 victory over Serbian powerhouse Partizan Belgrade. They finished first round with an 8–2 record and took first place in the group. On 16 December, Kšyštof Lavrinovič signed a two-year deal with Rytas. On 5 January 2015, Simas Jasaitis, another Lithuanian national team member, also signed with Rytas for the third time in his career. Lietuvos rytas started the last 32-game stage in the EuroCup by winning against the best team in Poland, Turów Zgorzelec which was relegated to EuroCup after winning only one game in the EuroLeague's regular season. Despite a successful start, Rytas lost three games out of six in the second stage and qualified into the next round by taking second place in the group only after the crucial defeat of Telenet Oostende 111–83 at the last game in Vilnius. Due to the questionable shape of the team, Virginijus Šeškus was fired as head coach. Despite this he remained with Rytas as an assistant to the new head coach Marcelo Nicola.

Between 20 and 22 February, Rytas participated in the 2015 LKF Cup. They defeated Dzūkija Alytus 78–63 in the quarterfinals, and Šiauliai 71–61 in the semifinals. However, Rytas lost the season's first trophy to principal rival Žalgiris Kaunas 82–76 at the finals and extended their trophy drought.

On 4 March, Lietuvos rytas played the first game of the EuroCup playoffs against Pınar Karşıyaka. Despite having a double-digit lead multiple times, Rytas failed to secure the game until the final seconds. The match finished with an 81–81 tie; the series winner was to be decided in Turkey. On 11 March, Rytas players failed to show any promise of winning the game. The deficit after the first two quarters was 34–53. The result was 97–81, ending the two-time EuroCup champion Rytas' career early that year.

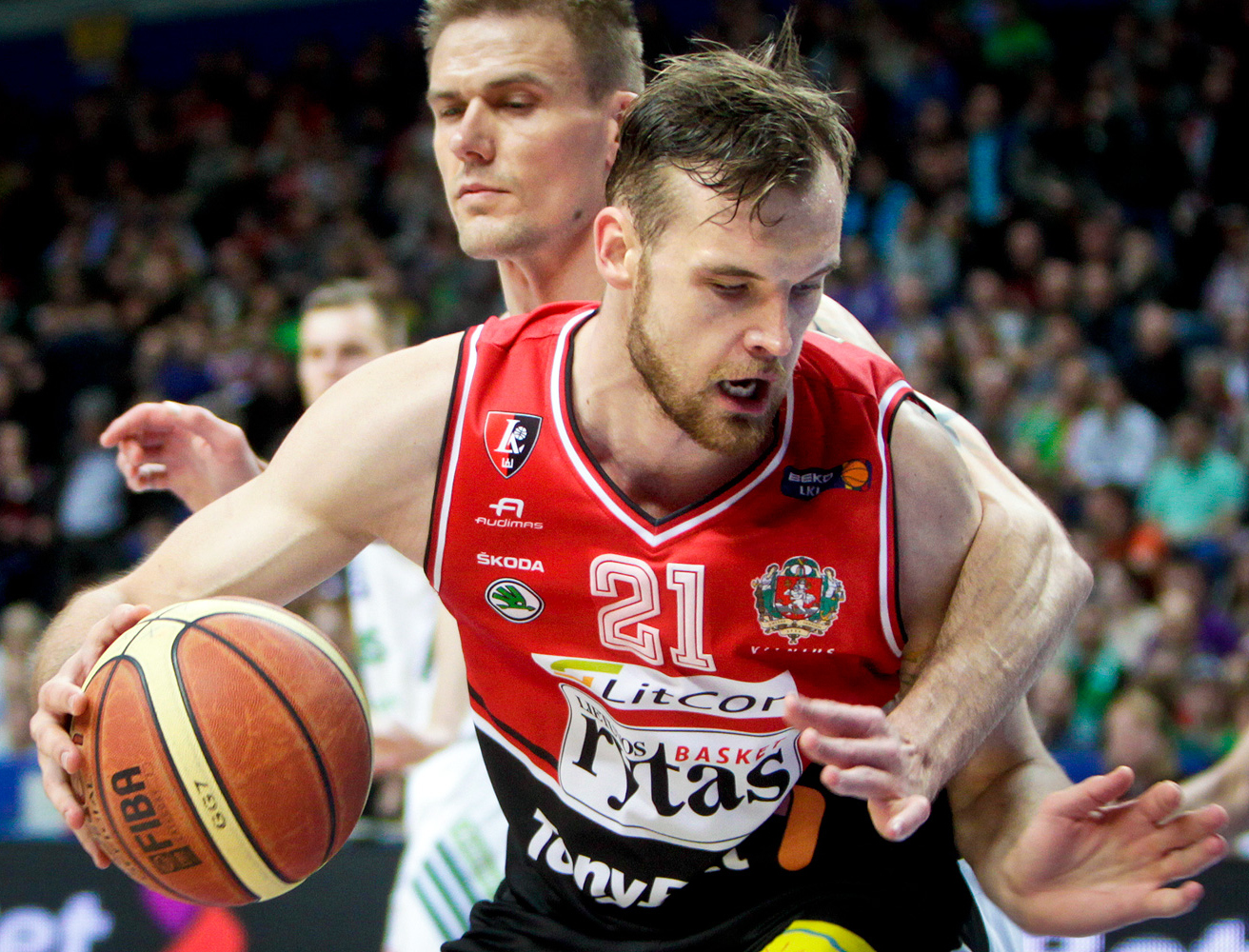
Antanas Kavaliauskas, one of the primary Rytas players in the 2014–15 season

In LKL, Rytas' start was uneasy. On 19 October 2014, they suffered their first defeat against Žalgiris Kaunas 84–82 in Vilnius, although, they defeated Neptūnas Klaipėda 73–65 a week later. On 15 November, they lost to Pieno žvaigždės Pasvalys 87–85. On 28 December, Rytas also lost to Neptūnas 94–90 in their home arena. On 1 January 2015, Rytas failed to win the second game against Žalgiris in Kaunas, losing 91–77. On 8 March 2015, Rytas had shown positive signs under their new head coach Nicola. They defeated Žalgiris Kaunas in Vilnius 93–66. Žalgiris Kaunas' assistant coach Šarūnas Jasikevičius described the game as a "shame". Following the fiasco in the EuroCup, on 15 March, Rytas defeated Neptūnas 87–86 for the second time in Klaipėda after a goal by Mike Moser with only 0.6 second remaining, and firmly improved the chances of taking the first spot during the regular LKL season. On 13 April, Rytas defeated Neptūnas 84–75 for the third time, for its 16th straight victory in LKL, and guaranteeing at least a second spot in the regular LKL season. The winning streak ended on the final day of the regular season, with an 82–81 loss to Žalgiris Kaunas. With the loss, Rytas entered the playoffs as the second seed team. The referees' decisions sparked many discussions. Consequently, Rytas asked LKL to hire foreign-born referees during the semifinals and the grand finals to completely guarantee referee impartiality. Their request was rejected by the majority of the LKL clubs.

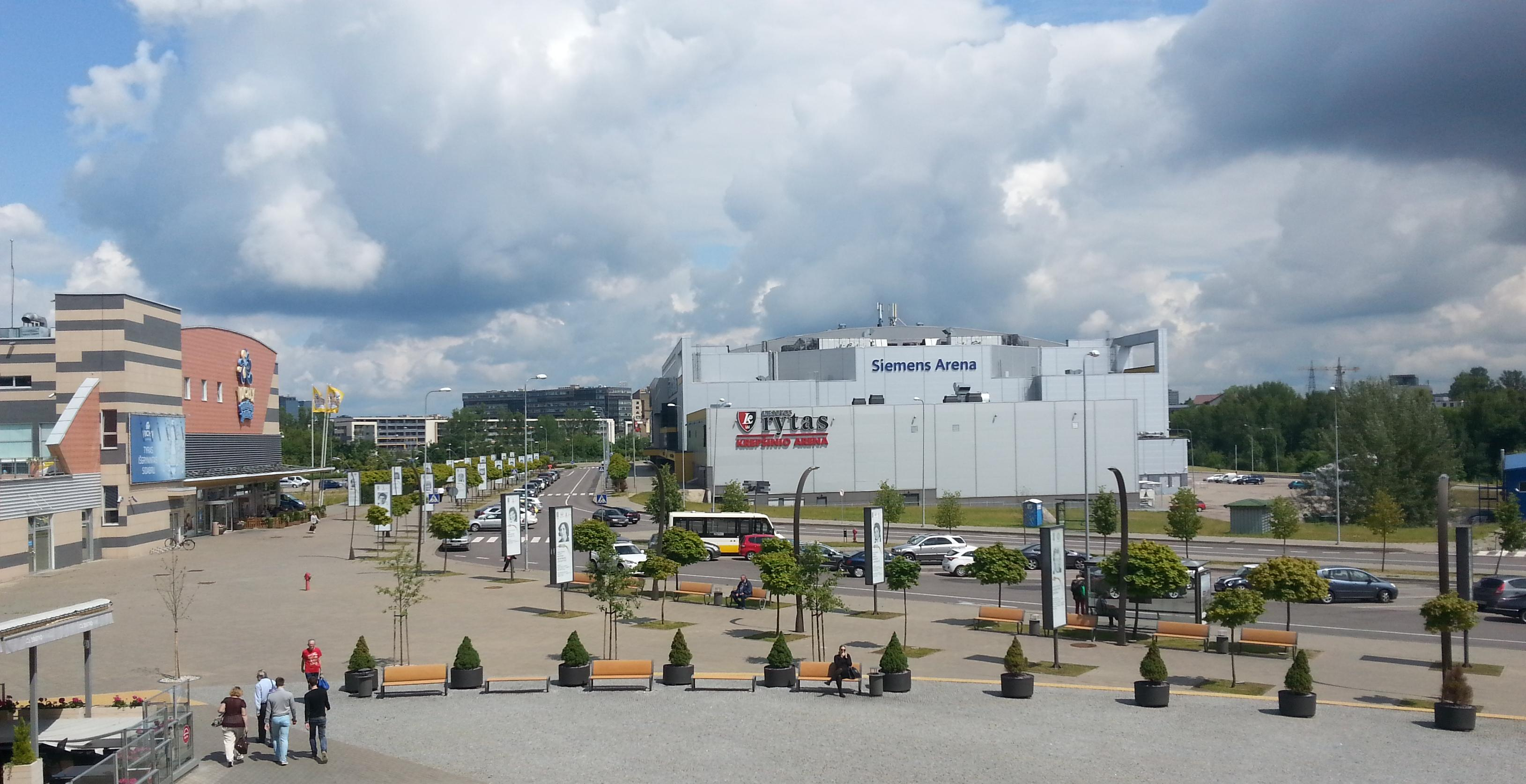
Rytas played LKL finals in their 2,500-seat arena for the first time in the club's history.

Rytas began the LKL playoffs defeating Šiauliai 3–0 in the series (97–69, 107–96 and 96–92), despite the efforts Rokas Giedraitis who was signed with Lietuvos rytas the following season. The LKL semifinals were more difficult for the team who defeated Neptūnas only during the game's final minutes 88–79. They later lost 107–101 in Klaipėda after overtime and the semifinal series tied at 1–1. Rytas won 96–89 two days later in Vilnius. A crucial game in Klaipėda began well; the team had a 29-point lead at one time. Neptūnas almost tied the game at the end but Rytas won by five points and eliminated Neptūnas 3–1, qualifying for the LKL Finals after a one-year break.

The team began the LKL finals with a 73–66 loss to Žalgiris Kaunas. Antanas Kavaliauskas scored 17 points in the first half, Kšyštof Lavrinovič did the same in the second half with 17 points as well, but the team failed to receive solid support from the team captain Martynas Gecevičius (4 points, 0/5 three-pointers) and one of the key players Gediminas Orelik (2 points, 1/6 field goals). During the second game, Rytas was defeated 78–62 in Vilnius. All-season team leaders Gecevičius, Kavaliauskas and Orelik together scored only 13 points. Žalgiris Kaunas won two more games, 71–68 after overtime and 85–77. Rytas lost the finals 0–4 once again.

=== 2015–16 ===
"I don't know how they got this information, but they tried to lure me. <...> Vilnius. Family. Challenge. Beloved team. BC Lietuvos rytas had more levers at his side."

— Antanas Kavaliauskas, describing his "Loyalty..." message in Twitter, which he wrote after rejecting the identical contract from the LKL champions Žalgiris Kaunas that competed in the EuroLeague.

On 5 July 2015, Lietuvos rytas president Gedvydas Vainauskas admitted that the ticket prices and the move to the 2,500-seat arena during the primary games were a failure and said that the club was seeking to fill vacant positions in the near future. The club started playing many of their games at the Siemens Arena following an agreement with the arena. The deal with the arena owners is in place until 2020. Despite all of Rytas' efforts and Euroleague Basketball Company promises to LKL, the club did not receive a wild card to the tournament and had to play in the second-tier league EuroCup for a second straight season.

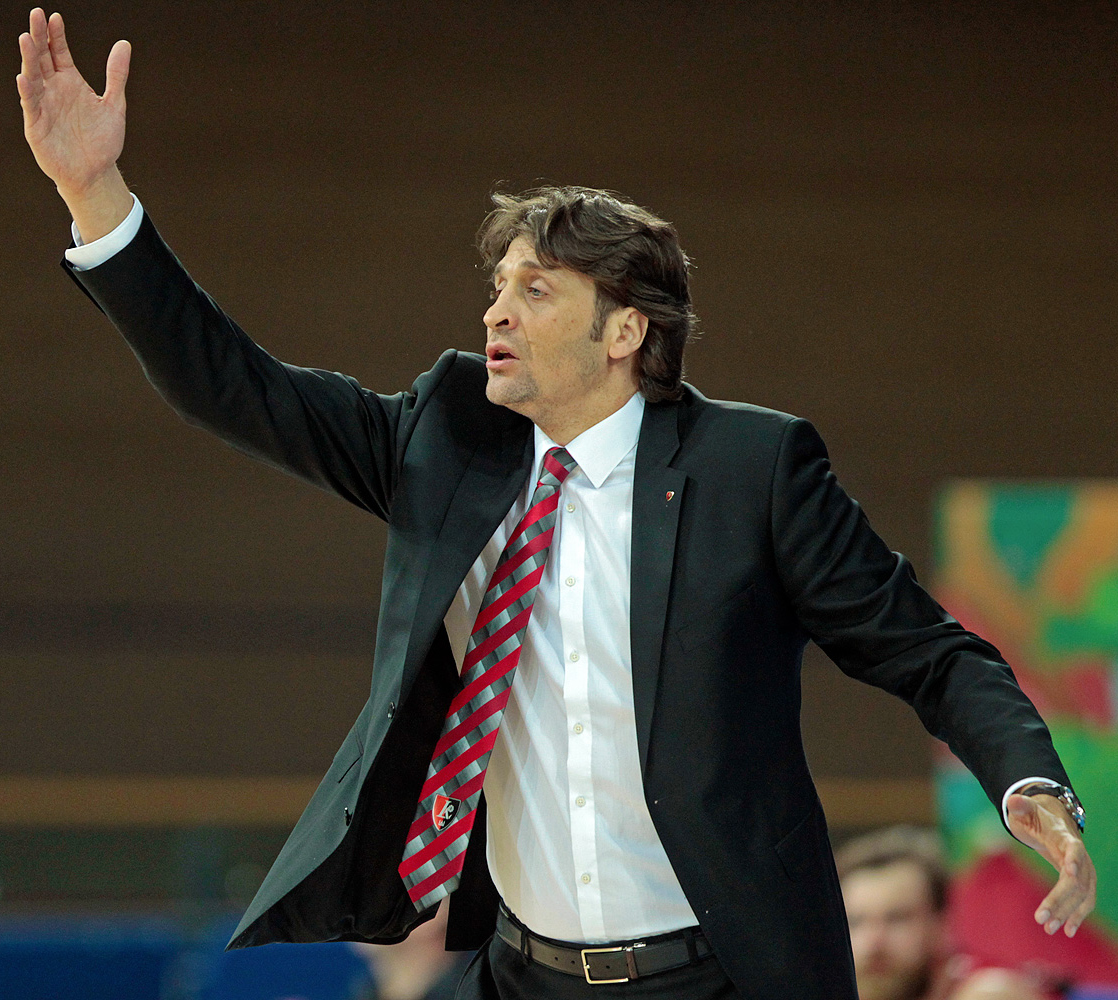
Marcelo Nicola remained as the head coach of the team but was fired in the middle of November due to the team's poor results.

Rytas began signing new team members early on. Billy Baron, Mike Moser, and Travis Leslie left the team. Marcelo Nicola remained as the head coach of the team, despite the disastrous LKL finals. Then one of the CSU Asesoft Ploiești leaders Marius Runkauskas replaced Martynas Gecevičius. The club's president said later in an interview said that a contract extension with a team leader, who scores only 10 points in four final games, is not possible. Unlike Gecevičius, another Rytas leader Antanas Kavaliauskas signed a new three-year deal. Rytas also signed Deividas Gailius, who was Neptūnas Klaipėda's team leader. As a result, Simas Jasaitis had to leave the team. In a surprise move, Rytas signed Artūras Gudaitis, who was a member of their principal opponents Žalgiris Kaunas, and was recently drafted by the Philadelphia 76ers, by paying to buyout his contract. Rokas Giedraitis also signed four-year deal with the club. Furthermore, one of the Šiauliai leaders Julius Jucikas replaced Artūras Valeika. Seven Lietuvos rytas players were invited to the Lithuania men's national basketball team training camp.

Argentina national basketball team member Nicolás Laprovíttola became the final player on Rytas' in the summer of 2015. On 19 August, first training camp was held. On 4 September, Krasta Auto (Lithuania's authorised BMW dealer) became one of the club sponsors, giving 14 new cars to club members and replacing the former vehicle sponsor Škoda Auto. The agreement was signed for three years. On 23 September, Kavaliauskas was chosen captain of the team.

Rytas had a positive start to the pre-season by winning a friendly tournament in Alytus and then the Vladas Garastas Cup, where they defeated the EuroLeague participant Khimki in the final 85–84. Rytas also started the LKL in dominating fashion.

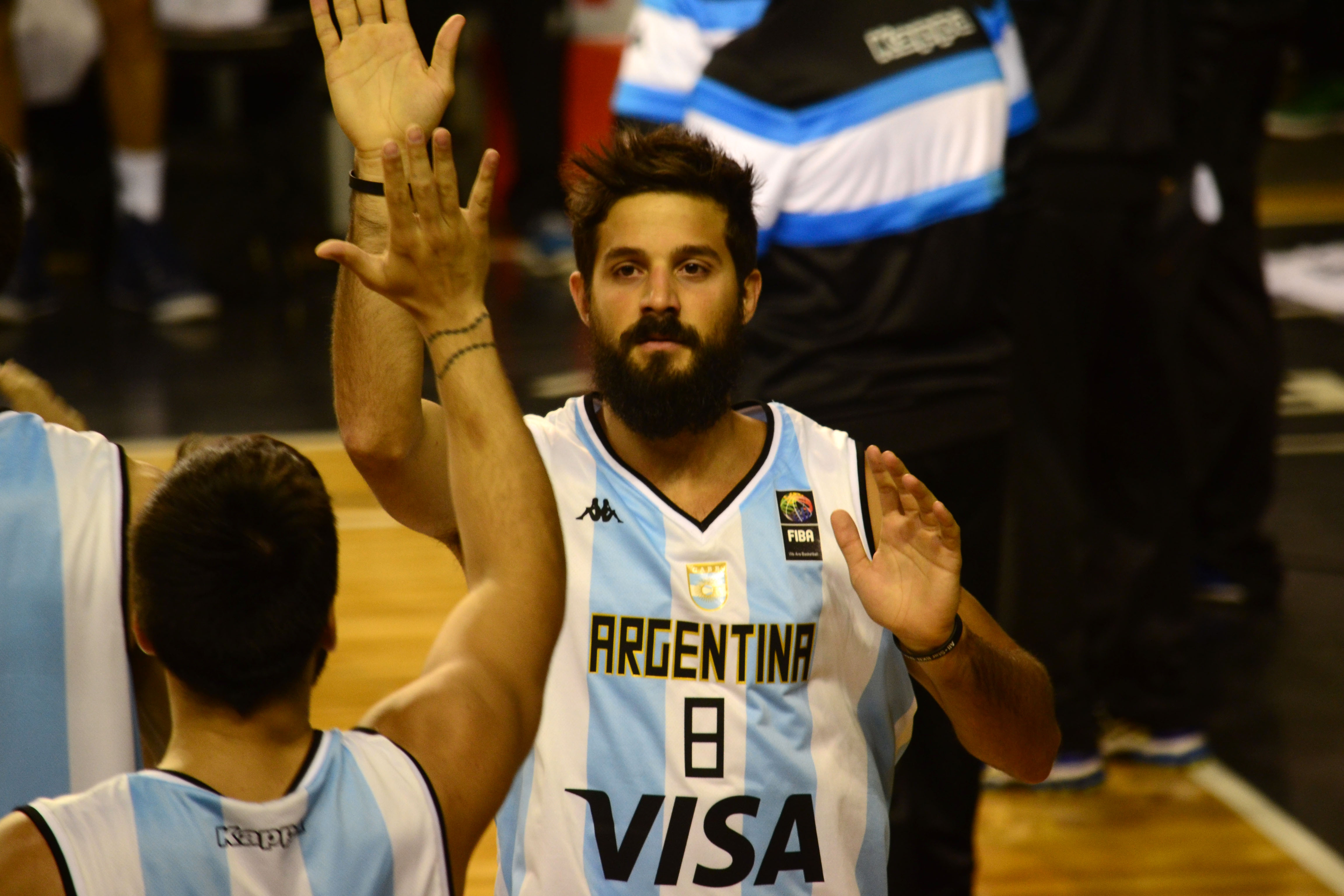
Nicolás Laprovíttola was the team's only foreign player in the EuroCup.

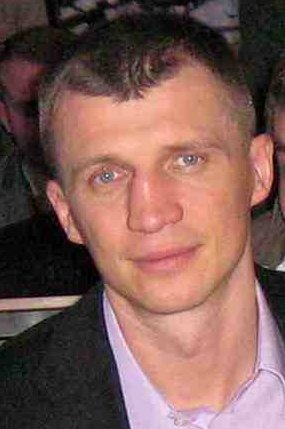
Under the command of the new coach Tomas Pačėsas, Rytas won first major trophy in six years.

The return to the Siemens Arena at the start of the 2015–16 EuroCup season, ended with a 91–87 defeat to Beşiktaş J.K. The team then defeateded Szolnoki Olaj 89–65. After a 79–70 loss to Žalgiris Kaunas, problems began to surface. After losses to Avtodor Saratov 97–81 and Zenit Saint Petersburg 70–65 at home in the EuroCup, the team was booed off the court. Rytas also lost to PAOK 81–76, and rumors started about conflicts between coach Nicola and the team. Due to team's losing record Marcelo Nicola was fired. There were rumors he would be replaced by Tomas Pačėsas. Under coach Aurimas Jasilionis, however, the team played its best match of the season—a 103–92 win over Beşiktaş J.K in Istanbul. A few days later, despite their improved play, Rytas lost 82–68 to Žalgiris Kaunas in the Siemens Arena. The team's poor form was quickly recalled when Rytas lost another EuroCup home game, this time to Szolnoki Olaj 99–98. Rytas then lost to Avtodor Saratov 109–92, leaving minimal hope it would qualify for the Last-32 stage in the EuroCup. After the loss, coach Jasilionis was replaced by longtime assistant coach Arvydas Gronskis. After another loss, this time to Zenit Saint Petersburg 94–84, Rytas lost all hope of qualifying for the Last-32 stage. In the final game, Rytas lost to PAOK 88–81 at home, finishing with a 2–8 record. After the EuroCup fiasco, coach Gronskis was sent to the reserve team Perlas Vilnius again, and Tomas Pačėsas became the team's new head coach. The team finished the year with a three straight victories.

On 31 December, Nicolás Laprovíttola left the team. On 10 January, Julius Jucikas was traded to Dzūkija Alytus for Adam Łapeta. On 17 January, Rytas achieved the season's first victory versus Žalgiris Kaunas 78–72. On 19–21 February, Rytas competed in the newly formed Karaliaus Mindaugo taurė tournament. After defeating Lietkabelis Panevėžys in the quarterfinals 88–82, Neptūnas Klaipėda in the semifinals 97–79, and Žalgiris Kaunas in the final 67–57, the team won their first trophy following a five-season drought. Antanas Kavaliauskas was named MVP. On 29 March, Rytas signed a three-years contract with the Euroleague Basketball Company to compete in its organized tournaments.

The rest of the season, however, was a disaster. Rytas lost the first place in the LKL regular season to rivals Žalgiris Kaunas. Rytas had difficulty in a victorious sweep against Lietkabelis Panevėžys in the quarterfinal stage. In the semifinals, the problems became clear when in the first match at Siemens Arena, Rytas lost to Neptūnas 83–71. After a 70–68 loss in Klaipėda, Rytas was down 0–2, though managed to win the next two games 66–64 and 74–73, setting a deciding fifth game at the Siemens Arena. Rytas lost 73–72 and lost the series 3–2, the worst fiasco in club history. This was also the first time Rytas was eliminated in the LKL by another team, instead of Žalgiris Kaunas. The disappointing season ended with the team winning the LKL bronze medal series 3–0 versus the Juventus Utena.

=== 2016–17: Departure of the old management ===
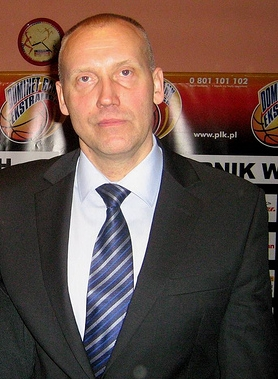
Rimas Kurtinaitis returned to BC Lietuvos rytas in 2017.

The new season began with a contract extension for Artūras Jomantas and Artūras Gudaitis, who decided to remain with the club. Following this, Rytas signed David Logan, who had been a EuroLeague star under coach Tomas Pačėsas. On 23 July, the front line was strengthened by the athletic Kenny Kadji. On 27 July, Adam Łapeta signed a new two-year contract. During the summer, team captain Kavaliauskas reportedly had a dispute with the team management concerning his pay.

Soon it was announced that Kavaliauskas would probably not return for the next season, leading to him deleting the infamous "Loyalty.." message he wrote about Lietuvos rytas the previous summer. In August, in a move that shocked fans of both teams, Kavaliauskas left the team and signed with Žalgiris Kaunas. On 30 August, Drew Gordon was signed. On 1 October, Rashaun Broadus signed a trial deal. On 2 October, Kadji was released after failing to adapt to the team after playing just three games. On 22 November, one of the Nigerian national team leaders Josh Akognon was signed as primary point guard. On 9 December, Broadus was fired. On 28 December, Clevin Hannah joined the team, along with Laimonas Kisielius. On 21 January, Akognon left the team.

Lietuvos rytas qualified for the EuroCup Top 16 phase with a 3–5 record, in large part due to the efforts of Drew Gordon, David Logan and Artūras Gudaitis. Many troubles began before the start of the top 16, as Gudaitis and Gailius suffered injuries. Rytas lost a very close game to Hapoel Jerusalem at the start in Vilnius, losing 80–76 in a game Rytas led by as much as 20 points. The fans and coaching staff blamed the referees for the loss after the game. In the second round, Rytas lost to Zenit Saint Petersburg 88–79 in an away game. In the next two weeks, Rytas faced Nizhny Novgorod, winning both times – 97–63 away, and 99–73 at home, with chances to reach the playoffs returning. After a tough game, and a loss, to Hapoel in Jerusalem 82–77, Rytas faced Zenit at home. David Logan scored 28 points in the deciding game, with Rytas winning 86–84 but just narrowly missing the playoffs as Zenit won the first game by nine points. After failing to progress into the EuroCup Playoffs the club announced addition of guard Jimmy Baron from local rivals Neptūnas Klaipėda. On 10 February, Tomas Pačėsas decided to leave the club and resigned, and was replaced by Rimas Kurtinaitis, who had coached Rytas to most of its titles previously. The coaching change, however, did not save Rytas from losing in the first round of the King Mindaugas Cup. Rytas, the defending champion, lost to Juventus Utena 87–84. The loss was David Logan's last game. After weeks of rumors, he left to sign with Sidigas Avellino. On 25 February, club signed a contract with forward Taylor Brown from the Polish Basketball League.

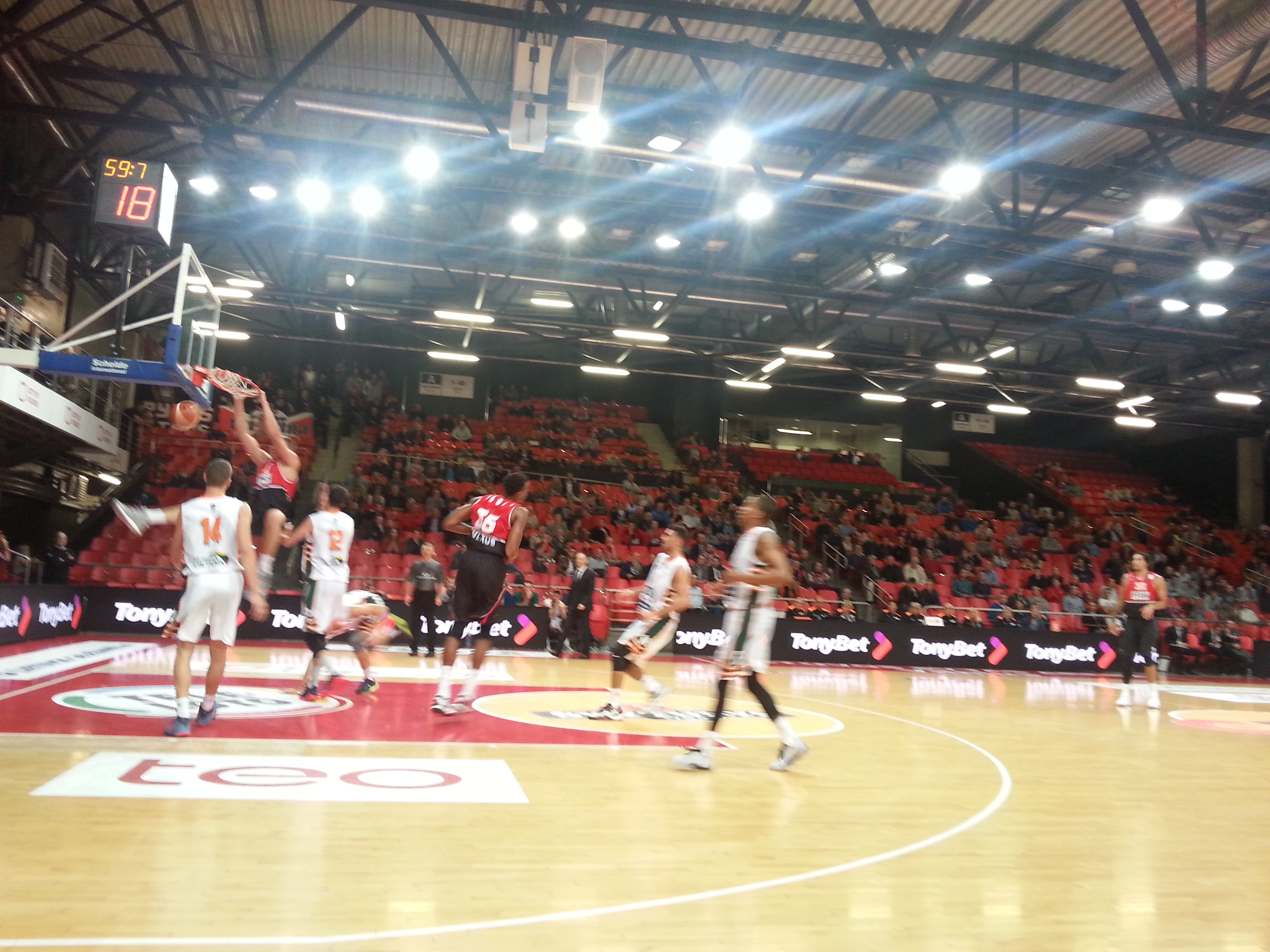
Scene from the LKL season opening game versus Nevėžis Kėdainiai

In the LKL, with coach Pačėsas, the team fell to third place for much of the season, only moving in to second place by the last weeks of the regular season under coach Kurtinaitis. Rytas split the season series with new rivals Neptūnas Klaipėda, and with the rising Lietkabelis Panevėžys team. Against Žalgiris Kaunas, however, this was not the case - Žalgiris swept Rytas in the regular season. In the LKL playoffs, Rytas faced, and swept Pieno žvaigždės Pasvalys in the quarterfinals 3–0. In the semifinal, Rytas faced Lietkabelis. In the regular season, both teams won at home, and fought for the second place and home court advantage, which Rytas won at the last game in Vilnius 92–60. Considered a favorite, Rytas won the first game 96–85 in Vilnius, a game with many conflicts between both teams, in particular Drew Gordon and Lietkabelis' forward Žygimantas Skučas. In the second game, Rytas lost in Panevėžys 90–73. With the series tied at 1–1, Rytas was the favorite heading in to the third game in Vilnius, Lietkabelis had never won in Vilnius before. However Rytas lost 81–73, and was down 1–2 in the series.

Heading to Panevėžys, trouble arose with regard to discipline violations by Taylor Brown, Corey Fisher and Clevin Hannah, though no actions were taken by the team until after the series. The three players, along with Drew Gordon, were subsequently suspended for the rest of the season. All of them were denying the violations but incontestable pictures were published. In Panevėžys, Rytas lost 86–77 and lost the series 1–3. This fiasco meant that Rytas did not qualify for the LKL finals for the second time in a row—the first time in the team's history this had happened.

In the bronze medal series, Rytas faced Neptūnas Klaipėda, who were now considered the favorite due to Rytas' internal problems. Rytas started the series with a 79–60 win in Vilnius. After losing in Klaipėda 83–70, Rytas won the third game in Vilnius 71–54, again taking a series lead. The last two games were very close. Led by Chris Lofton, Neptūnas tied the series in Klaipėda at 2–2 with a 70–65 win, leading to a decisive Game five in the next few days. Led by Gailius and Baron, former Neptūnas players, Rytas won the game 74–66 and the series 3–2, ending the season with a more positive note and avenging their 2016 loss to Neptūnas.

The season ended with an international scandal for the team, however, as club president Gedvydas Vainauskas made a controversial statement about black players on the team who behaved unprofessionally (saying no more than two players should play on the team and that more are like a gang), drawing negative attention to the team from around the world.

== New owners' era (2017–present) ==
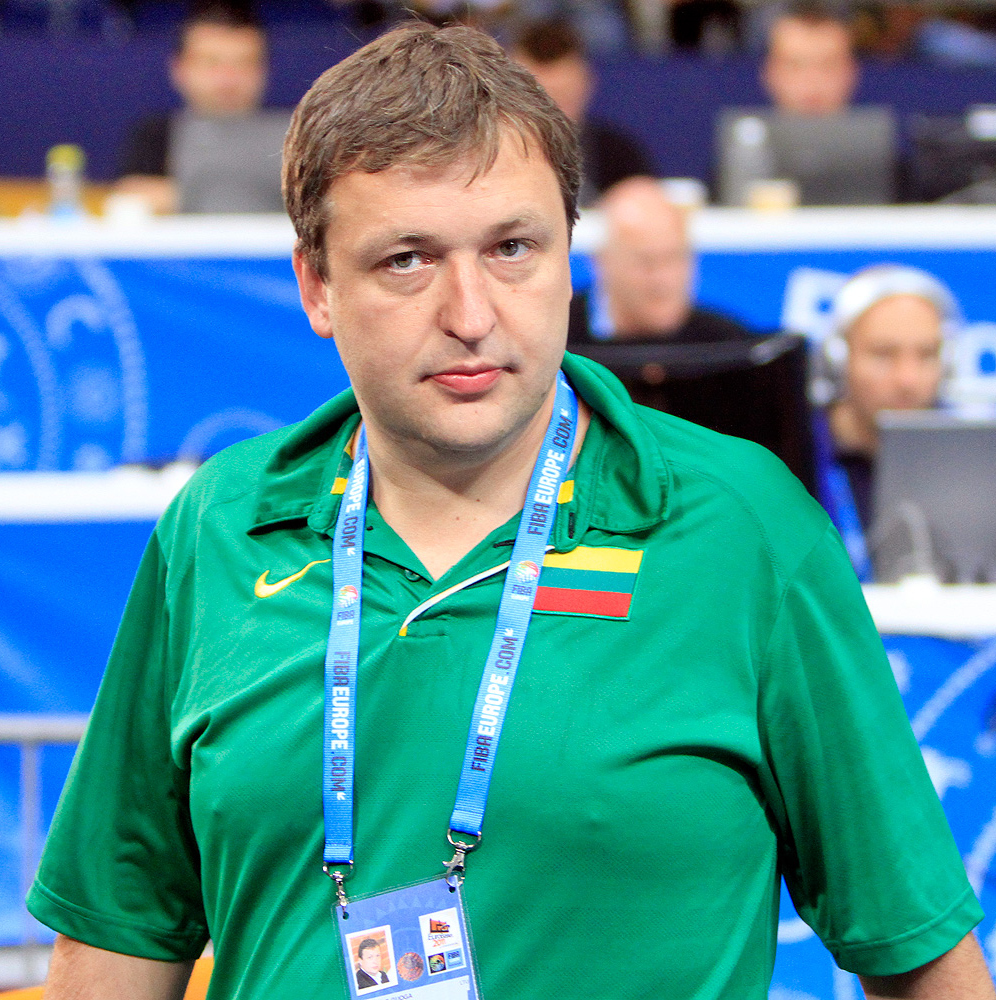
In 2017, Antanas Guoga bought a major stake in the club.

On 19 June 2017, famous poker player, businessman and European Parliament member Antanas Guoga bought fifty percent of the club from Sigitas Židonis and Remigijus Kazilionis. Two remaining stake owners Darius Gudelis and Vilnius City Municipality retained their rights to the club (twenty-five percent each). On 20 June Gedvydas Vainauskas resigned as president of Rytas a position he held since the founding of the club in 1997, just a week after receiving an award from LKL president Remigijus Milašius for his contributions to basketball.

Shortly after becoming the new owner of the club, Guoga sparked discussions about changing the club's name and invited the public to offer their ideas since the team no longer had connections with the Vainauskas' newspaper Lietuvos rytas. The idea was sharply criticised by the club's elite fans, group B Tribūna (Rytas Ultras), who said the only team they would support is black-white-red Rytas. On 21 June, the new owners organised a meeting, during which the first changes were announced. The public institution Krepšinio rytas was renamed to Statyba to honour the historical Statyba Vilnius, Darius Gudelis replaced Martynas Purlys as the club's director, and it was decided that the club's name Lietuvos rytas would be changed within a year with the most likely, but not yet final, choice being Rytas. Guoga also told the media it was very likely that at least two Lithuanian basketball stars will participate on the team, in addition to Jonas Valančiūnas, Linas Kleiza and Arvydas Macijauskas. On 4 July, Gudelis announced that former assistant coach Alberto Blanco and Linas Kleiza were joining the club. Their first task was to assist Rimas Kurtinaitis to bring together a new team roster.

On 13 July, a press conference was held during which it was announced that Kleiza had also become a shareholder of the club buying part of the Guoga's stake. He was named vice-president of the club and would act as sports director. Limited liability company Norvelita and Perlas also became shareholders of the club.

Despite positive changes in the club, rifts between the new owners started to emerge after it announced a sponsorship agreement with Lithuanian business consortium MG Baltic. Club president Antanas Guoga condemned the partnership and demanded an annulment of it and the resignation of CEO Darius Gudelis. Despite his wishes the other shareholders decided against these actions and openly questioned Guoga's financial commitment to the club. Finally on 24 October, the club announced that Guoga had sold his share in the club to Gudelis and had written off €300,000 that he had previously loaned the club. On 9 October 2018, however, it was revealed Guoga was still the team's president. Gudelis resigned on 15 November, after a controversy involving Blanco. Executive director Julius Serapinas was named as his replacement. On 7 June 2019, Serapinas was replaced by former Rytas player Rolandas Jarutis. Kleiza left the team in February 2020, after a falling out with Jarutis.

=== 2017–18: Comeback ===
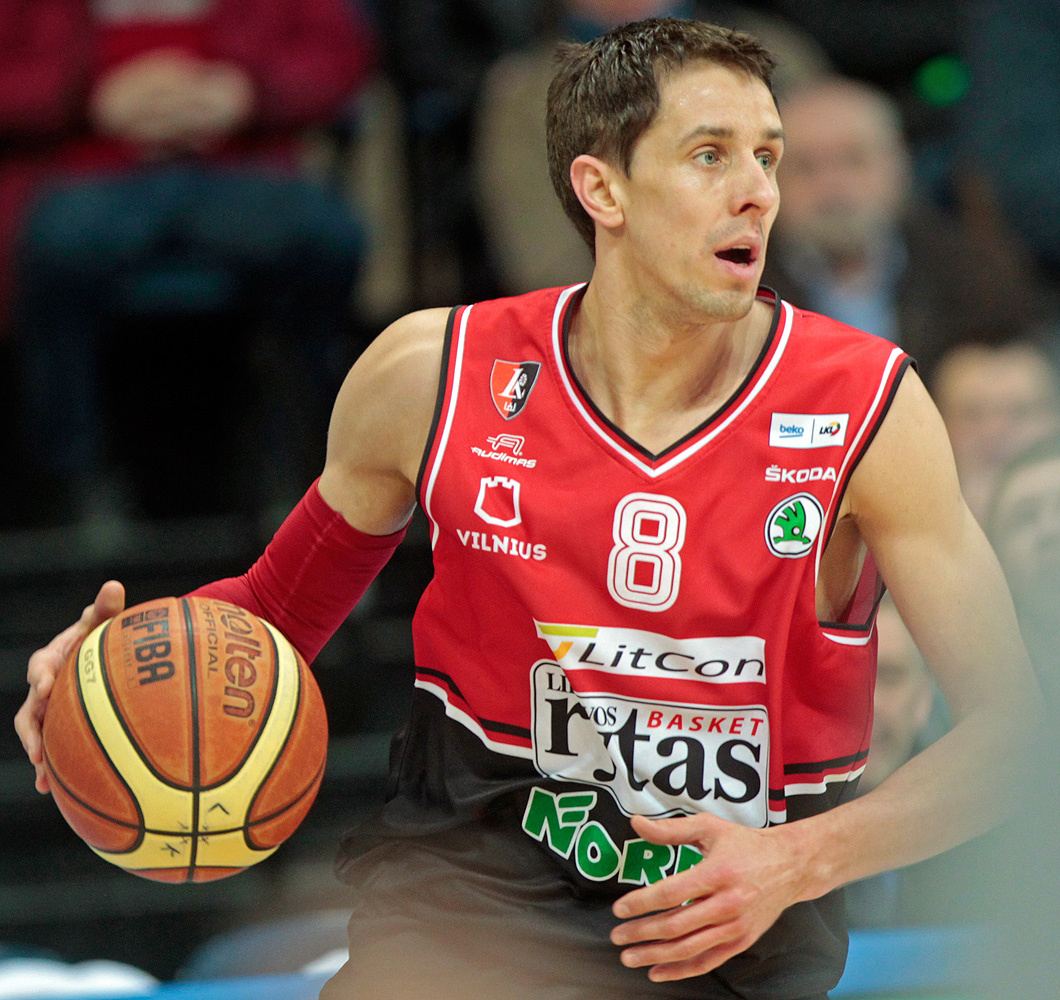
BC Lietuvos rytas symbol Mindaugas Lukauskis returned to the team for his ninth season and helped his long-time team return to the Lithuanian League finals. He was the league's oldest player.

On 14 June 2017, it was announced that Rytas had received a wild card to the 2017–18 EuroCup season. On 17 June, Rytas signed with first addition to the club for the upcoming season, former Lietkabelis leader Ben Madgen.

Rimas Kurtinaitis remained as head coach. On 11 July, famous Lithuanian masseur Juozas Petkevičius returned to the team. After launching ticket sales for the upcoming season, the team has sold 1,800 season tickets in less than 24 hours. On 19 July, Rytas signed veteran Mindaugas Lukauskis for his ninth season as a club member.

On the following day, Travis Peterson was signed and Kurtinaitis also confirmed that the team had reached an agreement with Chris Kramer. On 22 July, Chris Kramer and Marc Antonio Carter officially joined the team. On 28 July, Mindaugas Brazys joined the coaching staff. On 17 August, notable Lithuanian youth national team member Martynas Echodas was signed to a three-year deal. The newly formed team showed positive results during the preparation games, winning all seven games and the Vladas Garastas Cup.

On 23 September, Rytas began the 2017–18 LKL season by defeating Juventus Utena 82–75. On 25 September, Rytas signed experienced veteran Loukas Mavrokefalidis. Due to Artūras Gudaitis' departure to the Olimpia Milano, he was replaced by Egidijus Mockevičius, who signed a three-year deal with the team on 30 September. However, Mockevičius was unable to play due to injury. In the LKL regular season, Rytas played its best season since 2015.

Wins over rivals Neptūnas Klaipėda and Lietkabelis Panevėžys helped Rytas reach second place in the standings, behind Žalgiris Kaunas, with whom Rytas tied in the regular season series. In the LKL playoffs, Rytas defeated Juventus Utena 3–0 in the quarterfinals. Having signed Neptūnas leaders Girdžiūnas and Butkevičius, Rytas became the most hated team in Klaipėda, and the rivalry between the two teams intensified. Rytas tied the season series with Neptūnas 2–2 in the regular season, with a win in Klaipėda in April 90–72, the first since the 2016 season. This helped Rytas secure second place in the standings. The two teams faced off in the LKL semifinals. In the first game in Vilnius, Rytas lost to Neptūnas 83–74. In the second game in Klaipėda, Rytas avenged the loss winning 67–49 and tying the series at 1–1. Rytas then won the third game at home, 74–67, to take a 2–1 series lead. In Klaipėda, with a chance to close out the series in the fourth game, Rytas took a 16-point lead in the first quarter. Neptūnas, however, came back and took the lead in the fourth quarter winning the game 74–70, and forcing the deciding match in Vilnius by tying the series 2–2. In the deciding fifth game Rytas defeated Neptūnas 88–82, winning the series 3–2. The win marked the first trip to the LKL finals since 2015. In the LKL finals, Rytas faced Žalgiris Kaunas, playing the best season since 1999 and coming off a third-place finish in the Euroleague. Rytas lost the first game, 96–83, in Kaunas. In the second game, Rytas won 82–73 in Vilnius, led by Mavrokefalidis scoring 22 points and Ben Madgen with 19, and tied the series at 1–1. This win marked the first win by Rytas in the LKL finals since 2011. In Kaunas, Žalgiris Kaunas won the game 90–80 and took a 2–1 series lead. Back in Vilnius, Rytas led for much of the first half but lost 82–78, with Žalgiris Kaunas taking a commanding 3–1 series lead. With one last chance, Rytas fought hard in the fifth game in Kaunas, but a strong fourth quarter by Žalgiris Kaunas led to an 80–70 win, and winning the series 4–1. In the 2018 Karaliaus Mindaugo taurė, Rytas avenged their previous season defeat against Juventus Utena, winning in overtime 91–88 in the quarterfinals. In the semifinals, held in Klaipėda, Rytas defeated Dzūkija Alytus 81–61. In the finals, Rytas faced rival Žalgiris Kaunas, who were having a successful season in the Euroleague. Coming off two wins against Žalgiris Kaunas in the LKL, Rytas lead in the first half, before Žalgiris Kaunas recovered in the second, dominating the game and beating Rytas 81–62 in the finals.

In the 2017–18 EuroCup Basketball season, Rytas lost at home to Bilbao Basket 93–83 in the opener. The next week, Rytas won their first game by defeating Partizan Belgrade 91–80 in Belgrade thanks to the efforts of Week MVP Rokas Giedraitis, who scored 28 points, and Loukas Mavrokefalidis, 26 points. An injury to Chris Kramer hurt the team. Rytas then lost a home game to PBC Lokomotiv Kuban 93–85 in overtime, as well as an away game to Alba Berlin 93–86. The team faced a lot of criticism for poor defence. With Kramer back in the lineup, Rytas defeated Limoges CSP at home, 92–76. The second round of the Eurocup was a huge success for Rytas. In Bilbao, Rytas avenged their loss by defeating Bilbao Basket 96–79 led by Chris Kramer, who scored 27 points, and became the Week MVP. A home win against Partizan Belgrade followed, 93–75. Rytas lost to Lokomotiv Kuban 77–68 in an away game.

Many changes occurred to the team at the same time. Marc Antonio Carter and power forward Robert Carter were released, and replaced by Mindaugas Girdžiūnas and Arnas Butkevičius, leaders from rivals Neptūnas Klaipėda, and Egidijus Mockevičius returned from injury. These changes helped, as Rytas won the most important game in the regular season, by defeating Alba Berlin 94–73 and avenging their first round loss. The win also helped Rytas qualify for the EuroCup Top 16. In the last game of the regular season, Rytas defeated Limoges CSP 71–69 in an away game, finishing second in the group C. In the Top 16, Rytas started by losing to B.C. Zenit Saint Petersburg at home, 98–96. After losing two more away games to Bayern Munich 81–68 and Fiat Torino 83–77, Rytas fell to an 0–3 record, its worst start in club history. A strong game by Martynas Echodas, who became the Week MVP, helped Rytas win against Fiat Torino 101–68 at home. During the same game, however, Arnas Butkevičius suffered a broken hand, and was out for about five weeks. In the most important game of the EuroCup season for Rytas, they fell to Zenit 113–100 in an away game, losing any chance to qualify for the EuroCup playoffs. Coach Kurtinaitis and the team faced heavy criticism for the poor defence. In the final home game in the EuroCup, Rytas lost to Bayern Munich 87–85, another poor defensive showing, and finished with a 1–5 record and last place in Top 16 group F.

=== 2018–19: King Mindaugas Cup winners and return to the EuroCup playoffs ===
"I want to underline that this team is special. I began professionally playing basketball when I was seventeen, I have won the Croatian championship and cup twice. I played in the Italian final, however this team is something different. I have to begin from the coach – he gives us directions, but you need to have 12 soldiers, pit bulls who would follow these. These guys are special and deserve the victory."

— Rok Stipčević, following the Rytas triumph in the 2018–19 King Mindaugas Cup Final Four.

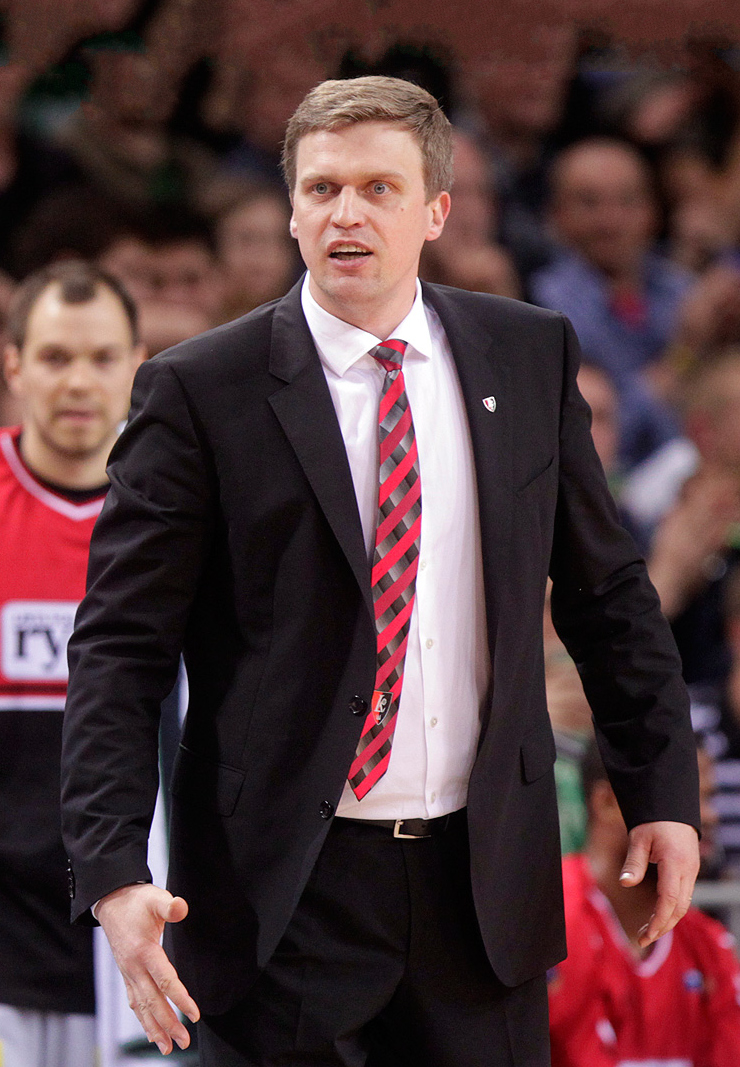
Lithuania men's national basketball team head coach Dainius Adomaitis returned to Rytas in 2018.

The preparation for the season began in June, during the semifinal series, with controversial rumors that Lithuanian national basketball team, and former Rytas head coach Dainius Adomaitis would replace coach Kurtinaitis at the end of the season. While the team denied the rumors, after losing the LKL finals to Žalgiris Kaunas, Adomaitis was named the team's new head coach. Former Rytas players, and current members of the national team, Eimantas Bendžius and Evaldas Kairys, were the first additions, signing in July. Dominique Sutton, formerly of Dolomiti Energia Trento, and one of the best players in both the Italian league and the Eurocup, signed in August. D. J. Seeley replaced Rokas Giedraitis, who left to sign with Alba Berlin. Rytas also signed point guard Matt Farrell, scoring leader from the University of Notre Dame, but he was released just before the season for reported personal reasons. Talented young players Deividas Sirvydis and Marek Blaževič were signed to long-term deals. Norbertas Giga, former member of the Rytas system, returned in October. Kramer, who resigned in the summer, was named the new team captain.

Rytas won the first game of the season, beating Juventus Utena, 87–57, in the start of the LKL. During the season, Rytas struggled against rivals Žalgiris, Lietkabelis and Neptūnas, which led to Rytas finishing third in the regular season with a 26–10 record, worst regular season finish in club history. Rytas faced Juventus in the quarterfinals, winning the series in 2–1. In the semifinals, Rytas faced Neptūnas who, for the first time, had home court advantage, defeating them shockingly easily 2–0 and advancing to the LKL Finals. In the LKL Finals, Žalgiris easily swept Rytas 3–0.

In the 2018–19 EuroCup Basketball season, Rytas played in group D, and struggled against top teams in the group, such as Unicaja Malaga, UNICS Kazan and Fraport Skyliners, but wins over KK Mornar and Fiat Torino helped Rytas qualify for the Top 16 stage with a 5–5 record. Seeley, Sutton (who was released in February) and Bendžius were the team leaders. Martynas Echodas was named the EuroCup Basketball Rising Star. In the Top 16 stage, now joined by Stipčević and Artsiom Parakhouski, Rytas struggled against Alba Berlin, which was led by former Rytas player Rokas Giedraitis, but wins over KK Partizan and AS Monaco helped them qualify for the EuroCup playoffs for the first time since 2015. Rytas faced Valencia Basket, losing the series 2–0 and being eliminated from the EuroCup.

During the 2018–19 season, Rytas won the King Mindaugas Cup. After eliminating Juventus Utena in the Quarterfinals, they eliminated Neptūnas Klaipėda in the semifinals 86–72 and then defeated Žalgiris Kaunas in the Final 70–67. After a season-ending injury to Kramer, Rytas signed Derek Needham to fill the point guard spot.

=== 2019–20: Final season in the EuroCup ===
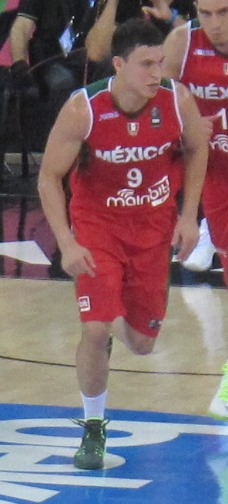
Francisco Cruz and Eimantas Bendžius were leaders of Rytas during the 2019–20 season.

During the off-season, Parakhouski, Seeley, Needham, Kramer, Stipčević, Giga, Normantas, Piliauskas all departed from the team. Rolandas Jarutis, former Rytas player, was named the new team manager. Under Jarutis, Rytas started adding more players from developmental team Perlas-MRU, like Augustas Marčiulionis, son of legendary basketball player Šarūnas Marčiulionis, Simas Jarumbauskas, Einaras Tubutis, Ąžuolas Tubelis and Marek Blaževič, who already had played in the previous seasons, but also played in the NKL for Perlas. Karolis Giedraitis, son of former Rytas player Andrius Giedraitis, also earned a spot on the team. Deividas Sirvydis, drafted in the 2019 NBA draft by the Dallas Mavericks as the 37th pick, but traded to the Detroit Pistons, remained with the team. Bendžius, Girdžiūnas and most importantly, the improving Butkevičius remained with the team. Butkevičius also debuted for the Lithuanian national basketball team in the World Cup. Rytas also signed Dovis Bičkauskis from Juventus and Tu Holloway as the new point guards. Australian Cameron Bairstow was signed as the new power forward, while Francisco Cruz was signed as the new shooting guard. Evaldas Kairys was initially among the players released during the summer, but was re-signed in September. After the season, coach Adomaitis remained with Rytas.

The preparation for the season began in August. Rytas largely struggled in pre-season matches. Rytas started the 2019–20 LKL season with a five-game winning streak. The win streak was snapped by Žalgiris Kaunas. Due to the COVID-19 pandemic, the LKL season ended prematurely - Žalgiris were announced as the winners, while Rytas finished second - one win over third-placed Lietkabelis Panevėžys. In the King Mindaugas Cup tournament, Rytas reached the finals, but was defeated by Žalgiris.

In the 2019–20 EuroCup Basketball season, Rytas played in Group B, with Umana Reyer Venezia, Partizan NIS, Tofaş, Lokomotiv Kuban and Limoges CSP. Wins over Lokomotiv Kuban and Tofaş helped Rytas qualify for the Top 16, with a 4–6 record, also eliminating the powerful Lokomotiv team, from the competition. Bendžius, Butkevičius and Cruz lead the team. In the Top 16 competition, Rytas played UNICS Kazan, AS Monaco and Galatasaray. Losses against AS Monaco and UNICS eliminated Rytas from playoff contention. Rytas finished with a 3–3 record, and third place in the standings. The season was later cancelled. During the season, Rytas gave much of the younger players playing time, with Blaževič in particular having a breakout season with Rytas, both in the LKL and the EuroCup.

=== 2020–21: Return to FIBA competitions ===
Rytas faced with the 2020–21 season with drastically reduced budget as the club had to pay off debts, despite the fact that the debt from June 2017 decreased from 4,040,000 Eur to 2,140,000 Eur, and fired team manager Jarutis. Therefore, the club decided to choose the Basketball Champions League instead of the EuroCup due to a much more beneficial financial offer and returned to a FIBA competition for the first time since the 2002–03 season. Rytas sold its young talents Deividas Sirvydis and Marek Blaževič for buyouts, with Marek in particular being a painful departure, as he left Rytas for Žalgiris. Captain Eimantas Bendžius left the club due to financial reasons, however Martynas Echodas and the new captain Arnas Butkevičius stayed in the team. Donaldas Kairys replaced Dainius Adomaitis in the head coach position. Also, Rytas signed with a former EuroLeague star Andrew Goudelock, Demetrius Jackson, who proved to be a pleasant surprise, Chris McCullough, and Lithuanians Saulius Kulvietis, Rokas Gustys, Gytis Radzevičius, Lukas Uleckas, Augustas Marčiulionis. Due to health reasons, contract with Kulvietis was terminated and he was replaced by Kristjan Kitsing; Maurice Ndour was also signed in October.

The season initially started strong for Rytas – at the start of the LKL, Rytas smashed BC Juventus in the opener 106–77, and went on a six-game win streak, thanks to great play from Goudelock and point guard Jackson. The win streak was stopped by Žalgiris Kaunas, who beat Rytas in Vilnius. Problems arose within Rytas, starting with Jackson shockingly leaving Rytas just days after their 2020–21 Basketball Champions League debut for personal reasons. McCullough had a number of off-court issues, ending with Rytas releasing him in November. Injuries, losses, reported and rumored conflicts between coach Kairys and Rytas players, poor player selection, with Ryan Boatright, replacing Jackson, and center Keith Benson becoming huge failures for Rytas, and by January, Rytas had completely fallen apart – Rytas ended their Champions League campaign after the group stage with a 2–4 record – a huge disappointment for the team. The problems continued – Ndour, one of the few bright spots for Rytas for the season, left Rytas after the exit in the Champions League. Rytas also suffered multiple upset losses in the LKL and in the King Mindaugas Cup, suffered the biggest fiasco of the season, losing to Juventus in the quarter-finals, including an embarrassing 27 point defeat at home. The loss proved to be the final game for coach Kairys, as he was fired immediately after the game, and was replaced by his assistant Giedrius Žibėnas. Rytas also made a few more changes to the roster, releasing Boatright and Benson soon after the firing of Kairys, and signing Ivan Buva as the new center.

Under Žibėnas, Rytas won their next 16 out of 17 games in the LKL, including an away win over Žalgiris in Kaunas – their first win over Žalgiris since February 2019, with a performance by Ivan Buva, and rose up the standings in the LKL by the end of the regular season, finishing in second place after Žalgiris. In the LKL playoffs, Rytas swept both BC Šiauliai and Eurocup team Lietkabelis Panevėžys to make the LKL finals. In the finals, Žalgiris swept Rytas 3–0. Many Rytas fans nonetheless largely considered the end of the season a success. After the season, coach Žibėnas signed an extension with the club to continue as head coach for the following season.

=== 2021–22: LKL champions ===
Rytas Vilnius celebrating after becoming the 2022 Lithuanian Basketball League Champions

During the off-season, much of the roster departed the team. Rytas signed players like the returning Margiris Normantas, Vaidas Kariniauskas, Jarvis Williams, Kenneth Smith and Tanner Leissner to strengthen the roster, while also keeping players like Buva, Butkevičius, Uleckas and Radzevičius, all among leaders of the previous season with the team. Coach Žibėnas remained as head coach of Rytas.

While Rytas initially had struggles, soon enough, Rytas started showing some potential. Injuries to Williams and Leissner lead to the brief return of Maurice Ndour. Rytas had a long win streak in both the LKL, and the Basketball Champions League. In the Champions League, Rytas finished 1st in the regular season, in a group that included EWE Baskets Oldenburg, Beşiktaş Icrypex and defending two-time champions of the tournament Hereda San Pablo Burgos, with Rytas getting memorable wins over Burgos both away, and at home, and finishing with a 4–2 record. In the LKL, Rytas had overtaken Žalgiris Kaunas in the standings, leading for much of the season. High hopes, nonetheless, once again hit some road blocks by January–March - the win streak ended with a close home loss to Žalgiris, who took first place in the LKL regular season, and Rytas struggled in the Champions League Round of 16 stage, falling behind Lenovo Tenerife, and SIG Strasbourg, finishing just out of the playoffs due to a point difference with SIG Strasbourg.

In the King Mindaugas Cup, held in Vilnius, Rytas was believed to be a favorite heading in - however, a shock loss to Lietkabelis Panevėžys in the semifinals left Rytas without the finals for the second consecutive season. Rytas won the bronze medal game against BC Šiauliai, also in a struggle. Žalgiris went on to win the tournament. During this time, Ndour once again left Rytas, and he was eventually replaced by former Rytas player Evaldas Kairys, who returned to the team.

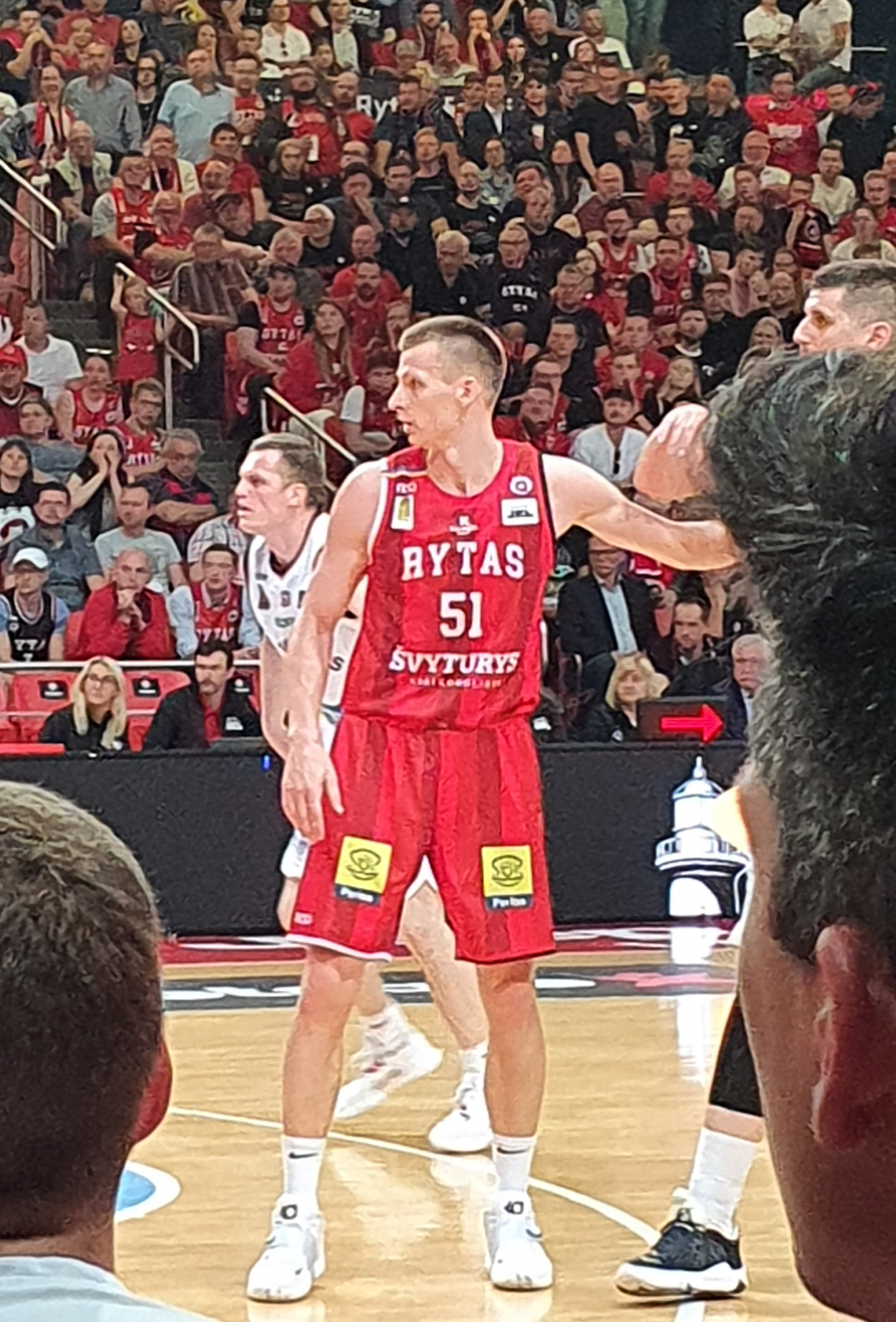
Arnas Butkevičius, captain of the team, during the 2022 LKL Finals

With the LKL remaining, by April, Rytas had once again found their game. Led by LKL MVP Buva, Rytas once again regained the LKL regular season leading position, by beating Žalgiris, and for the first time since 2013–14, Rytas finished in first place in the LKL standings and earned homecourt advantage for the playoffs. Great play by the improving Radzevičius, Uleckas, captain Butkevičius, Smith and the returning Jarvis Williams became the key for success. Players like Margiris Normantas were also praised for their efforts.

"I wanted this year's chebra (squad) to end the season victoriously. Getting over each other's heads benefits the team. Most importantly, it wouldn't have been useful if at the end of the season we hadn't realized that eventually we need to give in to something, accept our role, so that everyone is useful for the team and not for themselves. When we realized this, we became very strong. Of course, we didn't avoid mistakes, we didn't avoid bad decisions, but then we became a real team."

— Arnas Butkevičius.

In the LKL playoffs, Rytas had struggles - in the quarterfinals, Rytas defeated BC Dzūkija 3–1 in the quarterfinals, and BC Šiauliai 3–1 in the semifinals. Rytas would struggle early, but by the deciding games, would win in dominating fashion.

In the LKL finals, Rytas would face a surprising opponent in Lietkabelis Panevėžys, who had eliminated the defending champions Žalgiris in the semifinals - Žalgiris had won the previous 11 consecutive LKL championships, and had been the most hated team among Rytas fans. While not getting a chance for revenge against Žalgiris for all the years of loses, Rytas had become the favorite of the LKL finals for the first time in a very long time. In the LKL finals start, however, Rytas lost to Lietkabelis 77–68 at home, losing their homecourt advantage. Rytas, having to respond, responded in dominating fashion by winning the next two games 88–66 in Panevėžys, and 85–63 in Vilnius, in a very controversial game which included Lietkabelis head coach Nenand Čanak shoving Rytas head coach Žibėnas and even getting into an argument with Rytas director Darius Gudelis. In a much hyped game in Panevėžys, facing a deficit, Rytas managed to pull a win over Lietkabelis 78–77, on a dunk in the deciding seconds from Butkevičius, and took a 3–1 lead in the LKL finals. On June 7, 2022, Rytas had finally prevailed - beating Lietkabelis 79–76, Rytas won the series 4–1. For the first time since 2010, Rytas had regained the LKL championship.

=== 2022–23 ===
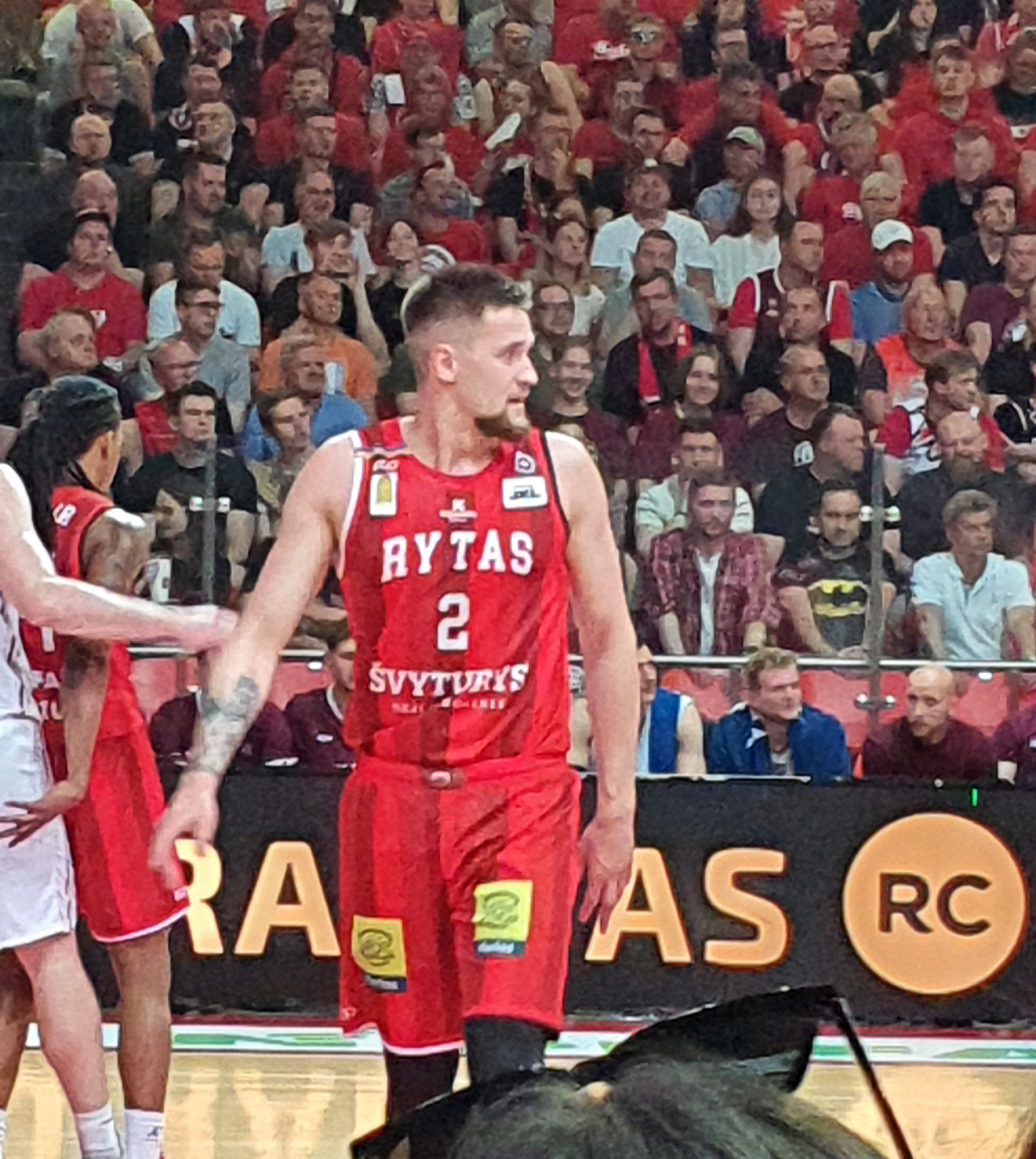
Following the departure of Butkevičius, Margiris Normantas was selected captain of the team in 2022.

Over the summer, much of the LKL championship winning team departed. Buva, Smith, Leissner, Girdžiūnas, Kariniauskas all departed. The most painful of the departures, was captain Arnas Butkevičius signing with hated rivals Žalgiris Kaunas. Rytas first signed the returning Martynas Echodas to replace the departing Ivan Buva. Rytas signed former Žalgiris player Gytis Masiulis to replace Leissner, while Todd Withers was signed to replace Butkevičius. Benedek Váradi and former LKL MVP with BC Šiauliai Elvar Már Friðriksson were signed as the new point guards to replace Kariniauskas and Smith. Rytas also signed Marcus Foster at guard. Rytas also re-signed Radzevičius and Uleckas to new contracts, and kept Normantas, Williams and Evaldas Kairys with the team. Coach Giedrius Žibėnas also remained with the team. During the pre-season, Marcus Foster lead Rytas in scoring. Rytas also signed Tomas Lekūnas to a short-term deal, as Withers had not arrived by the start of the season for personal reasons. Lekūnas later signed a deal for the rest of the season, while Withers had officially left the team. By March, Rytas had signed point guard Kendale McCullum, power forward Justin Gorham and center Jaime Echenique, with all three playing a big part in Rytas deep run in the LKL playoffs.

Rytas started the LKL season winning a close game against region rival Juventus 90–88. They continued the good start by winning two more games, but an unexpected defeat to Nevėžis at home on the fourth game completely shocked the team. They lost their next two games to CBet Jonava and Lietkabelis Panevežys, finding themselves with a disappointing 3–3 record to start. Rytas recovered, going on a seven-game win streak, which included a win over new rivals, BC Wolves, 91–89 away, and against long-time rivals Žalgiris, 89–85 at home, in a game where Foster scored 34 points and famously waved off the Žalgiris fans. The rivalry with the Wolves largely started due to the fact that the Wolves became the new team in Vilnius, and the games between both teams became very heated as the Wolves became one of the most hated teams among Rytas fans and many former Rytas players, like Lukauskis, joined the team, as well as being coached by long-time Rytas coach Rimas Kurtinaitis. Wolves snapped Rytas win streak in the LKL, with an 88–76 win over Rytas in Vilnius. Rytas rebounded, winning the next 11 out of 12 games in the LKL, and scoring an amazing win over Žalgiris in Kaunas, 100–94, with Normantas scoring 30 points and Foster scoring 28 points, renewing a rivalry with Žalgiris and a fight for first place in the LKL. Žalgiris, however, won the final game of the regular season between the teams, 81–75, a win that guaranteed Žalgiris first place in the LKL regular season over Rytas. Rytas finished by winning their last 6 games, including a win in Vilnius over Wolves, 102–98, with a 27–6 record. In the LKL playoffs, in the quarterfinals, Rytas faced old rivals BC Neptūnas, winning a very tough series 2–0, beating Neptūnas both at home in overtime, 107–99, and away, 95–91. In the semifinals, while many fans expected a Rytas–Wolves matchup, in an unexpected twist, Rytas faced CBet Jonava, who had swept the Wolves in the quarterfinals, was a surprise team of the season, and had already shocked Rytas in the King Mindaugas Cup semifinals. This time, Rytas gained revenge by beating CBet 82–74 at home, 82–67 in Jonava, and 90–85 at home, to sweep the series for a 3–0 win for Rytas. In the LKL finals, Rytas faced off against Žalgiris. In the first game, Žalgiris beat Rytas 108–93 at home to take the lead. In the second game, Rytas got revenge, while a tight game by halftime, Rytas had a very strong second half, leading to a dominating 94–71 win in the Jeep Arena in Vilnius, tying the series 1–1. Žalgiris won the next game 95–80 in Žalgiris Arena, to once again lead the series over Rytas. The fourth game became a classic – Žalgiris led much of the way, including double digits, looking to finish the series – Rytas, however, kept coming back, backed up by a packed Jeep Arena. In the deciding minutes, Rytas made one final comeback, and Marcus Foster won the game for Rytas with a deciding layup, 69–68, tying the series at 2–2. In the deciding game, in a packed Žalgiris Arena, Rytas led much of the game, including in the final minutes, before Žalgiris made a run led by Isaiah Taylor and former Rytas captain Butkevičius winning the game 97–87, and the series 3–2, to regain the LKL title. While defeated, Rytas earned much praise, both from Rytas fans and experts, for giving the best fight they could against a Žalgiris team that reached the Euroleague playoffs.

Rytas lost to Nevėžis-OPTIBET in King Mindaugas Cup qualifiers in their first game, 78–70, having to win at least by nine points their second match in Vilnius to advance to the Final Four tournament, held in Šiauliai. In the second game, after regulation, Rytas had led Nevėžis-OPTIBET 81–73, necessitating overtime. In overtime, the much stronger Rytas made short work of Nevėžis-OPTIBET, winning 98–78 to qualify for the semifinals. One of the main favorites to win the tournament, along with Žalgiris, Rytas was expected to beat CBet Jonava in the semifinals. However, just like the previous season, history repeated itself. Rytas played poorly while CBet played one of the best games of the season, and CBet beat Rytas 92–86 in the semifinals in one of the biggest shocks in tournament history. For the third consecutive season, Rytas was eliminated in the King Mindaugas Cup semifinals. In the bronze medal game, Rytas, while erasing a huge deficit, could not defeat BC Lietkabelis, losing the game 91–88 and finishing in a disappointing fourth place. Žalgiris went on to win the tournament.

Rytas started their FIBA Champions League campaign slowly, losing the first two away games of the tournament to the defending champions Lenovo Tenerife 89–74 and then following it up with a loss against Bnei Herzliya 90–85. In following games, they crushed Peristeri B.C., coached by legendary player Vassilis Spanoulis, 89–64 on their home debut, and beat them again 82–71 in Athens. Marcus Foster, for his strong performances, earned the MVP of November honors. With a 2–2 record, Rytas had a chance to qualify to the playoffs directly, however, Rytas lost to Bnei Herzliya at home, 101–90, dropping to 2–3. In the final game of the regular season, Rytas faced Lenovo Tenerife at home-, winning the game 85–78, and finished in second place in the group with a 3–3 record. While not being able to directly qualify to the Round of 16 phase, Rytas faced off PAOK in the tournament's play-in where they beat PAOK at home 85–62. PAOK tied the series with an 81–78 win over Rytas in Thessaloniki. In the deciding game, at home, Rytas once again dominated and won 82–63 over PAOK, winning the series 2–1 and qualifying to the Round of 16. In the deciding game for Rytas in the Champions League, they were defeated in an away game 82–69 by Baxi Manresa. Foster continued his string of strong performances. Rytas beat Bahçeşehir Koleji at home, 95–88, and then faced one of the tournament favorites, Telekom Baskets Bonn, at both home and away. While Rytas came back after erasing a huge deficit in a home game, losing 86–79, they lost 99–72 in Bonn, with Rytas dropping 1–3. Rytas, still having a shot at the playoffs, earned a 92–69 away win against Bahçeşehir. With a 2–3 record, Rytas faced Baxi Manresa at home needing to win the game by 14 points to qualify for the playoffs. Baxi lead most of the game, but by the second half, Rytas had recovered and in the fourth quarter, took a 14-point lead over Baxi. Despite Rytas managed to win the game 96–95, Baxi qualified for the playoffs since both Rytas and Baxi finished with a 3–3 record, but a win by Baxi in the first game by 13 points led to Baxi's qualification. Foster finished the tournament as the top scorer.

=== 2023–24: Regaining the LKL championship ===
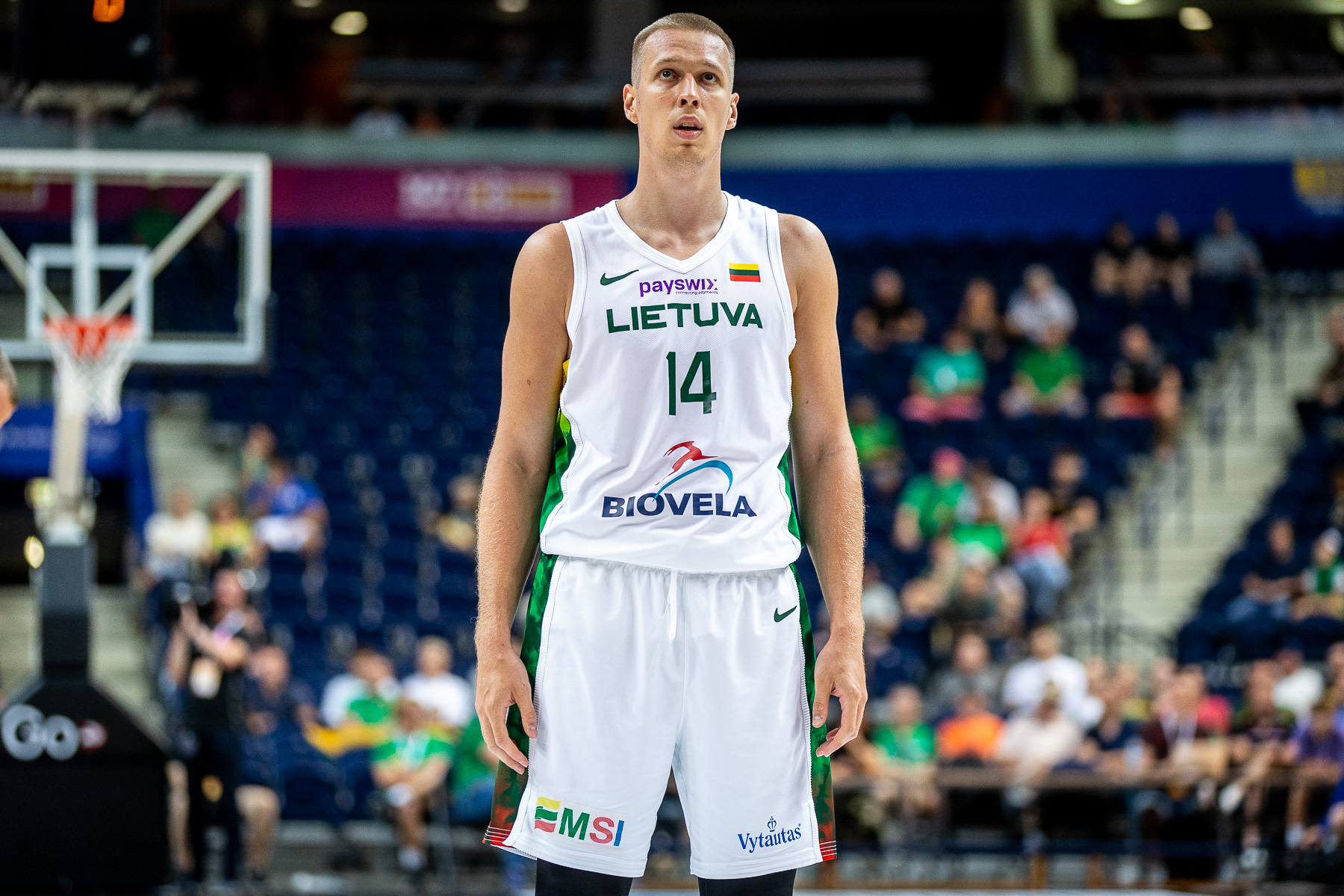
Martynas Echodas, one of the BC Rytas leaders during the 2023–24 season, burst into tears after winning the 2024 Lithuanian Basketball League title and described it as "probably the most joyful moment in life".

During the summer, McCullum, Fridriksson, Kairys, Lekūnas, Varadi, Echenique, and most importantly, team leader Marcus Foster all left the team, while Rytas re-signed team captain Normantas, Justin Gorham, Gytis Radzevičius and Martynas Echodas to new contracts during the summer. Coach Žibėnas was re-signed during the previous season. Rytas also signed new point guards Arnas Velička and R.J. Cole, center Javin DeLaurier and power forward Oskaras Pleikys to contracts. Keith Hornsby was initially signed as a replacement for Marcus Foster. Rytas also returned to play some home games in the Avia Solutions Group Arena, an arena now shared with inner-city rivals Wolves Vilnius.

During the Basketball Champions League season, Rytas started the season with a 0–2 record, with JDA Dijon, 87–83, and Promitheas Patras, 78–76, defeating Rytas in two away games. Rytas recovered with two dominating wins over BK Opava at home 99–63, and 95–75 away, and won home rematches against Promitheas, 77–75, and JDA Dijon, 79–77, to finish the regular season with a 4–2 record and one win behind group winners JDA Dijon, thus forced to fight for a spot in the Round of 16 in the Play-in tournament. Echodas, Normantas and Radzevičius lead the team in scoring during the regular season. Before the Play-in tournament, Marcus Foster returned to Rytas, replacing Hornsby. In the Play-in tournament, Rytas were heavy favorites against Peristeri Athens - the previous season, Rytas had easily beat Peristeri in the competition. Led by a more experienced Vassilis Spanoulis, however, Peristeri was not the same team as the previous season - Peristeri crushed Rytas in Vilnius, 110–92, and beat Rytas 83–80 at home in Athens, beating Rytas 2-0 and shockingly eliminating Rytas from the competition. While Marcus Foster provided a spark for Rytas, he was not able to save Rytas from the elimination.

In the King Mindaugas Cup, Rytas easily beat long-time rivals BC Juventus 98-86 and 104–67 in the quarterfinals. In the Final Four, held in Kaunas, once again, even with the addition of the returning Marcus Foster, Rytas failed - in the semifinals, 7bet-Lietkabelis, in a rematch of the previous two tournament semifinal and bronze medal games, once again beat Rytas, 94–86, in the semifinals - with Rytas missing another chance to return to the KMT finals. In the bronze medal game, Rytas beat BC Šiauliai, 94–89, in another hard-fought game to win the bronze medals. Žalgiris went on to win the tournament.

"It's an incredible feeling, we were so close last year, my heart really wanted to be here. I remember sitting in China and watching Rytas play against Žalgiris for the first time this season. I knew I would be here at this moment. I was confident that after the season in China I would be back here to fight for this title. Unbelievable, we played like never before. We pushed hard, everyone made their contribution."

— Marcus Foster.

In the LKL, for most of the season, Rytas fought for first place in the standings, against Žalgiris Kaunas and against the Wolves, the latter of whom Rytas fought against for the title of the best team in Vilnius. Rytas won the regular season series against the Wolves, but were swept by Žalgiris, thus finishing behind Žalgiris in the regular season standings, at second place. In the games against the Wolves, much of the fan-support was behind Rytas. Fueled by the return of Marcus Foster, Rytas entered the playoffs fighting for at least a spot in the LKL finals- in the quarterfinals, Rytas beat CBet Jonava 110–77 at home, and 96–90 away, to win the series 2–0, and to set up a LKL semifinals clash against the Wolves, for the battle of Vilnius, as titled by both the players for each team, and the press. Homecourt advantage belonged to Rytas, but with each team sharing the Avia Solutions Group Arena court, neither team really had an advantage. Wolves started the series by shocking Rytas with a 96–85 win, taking the lead, before Rytas won the next two games, tainted with incidents by the players and even coach Žibėnas, 113-75 and 86–78. Wolves tied the series with a 97–86 win, to set up the deciding fifth game clash. Led by Foster, heavily supported all series by Rytas fans, Rytas won a hard-fought game 92–87 to finish off the Wolves and win the series 3–2, with Rytas returning to the LKL Finals. Before the finals, rivals Žalgiris had suffered a huge blow as team leader Keenan Evans suffered a season ending injury - despite this, Žalgiris was still considered by most as the favorite to win the finals. Rytas had other ideas- in the first game, in Kaunas, Rytas beat the still shocked Žalgiris, by erasing a double digit deficit in the final minutes, in an overtime 89–88 win that took away the homecourt advantage for Žalgiris, with Rytas leading the series 1–0. In the second game, in Vilnius, once again, Žalgiris lead for most of the game, before Normantas and Foster sparked a comeback by Rytas - the game went to overtime, and again, Rytas managed to win, beating Žalgiris 104-94 and taking a 2–0 series lead. Žalgiris beat Rytas in Kaunas, 91–81. The fourth game became a classic - heavily cheered by over 9000 fans in the arena, Rytas would beat Žalgiris on a deciding layup by Foster, who scored 33 points, 88–87, to win the series and the LKL championship 3–1, winning their second championship in two years. Marcus Foster was named the 2024 LKL Finals Most Valuable Player. The win by Rytas is considered by everyone to be the biggest upset ever in the LKL Finals.
