= Former Lietuvos rytas rosters =

== 1997-98 Korać Cup season ==
BC Lietuvos Rytas roster
Players
Coaches

Pos.	No.	Nat.	Name	Ht.	Wt.	Age
C	4	(Lithuania)	Kazlauskas, Arnas	2.04 m (6 ft 8 in)	104 kg (229 lb)	49 – 11 March 1976
F	5	(Lithuania)	Šležas, Andrius	1.98 m (6 ft 6 in)	89 kg (196 lb)	50 – 4 February 1975
F	7	(Lithuania)	Mikalajūnas, Egidijus	1.99 m (6 ft 6 in)	94 kg (207 lb)	53 – 24 February 1972
C	8	(Lithuania)	Stulga, Gintaras	2.10 m (6 ft 11 in)	110 kg (243 lb)	52 – 21 February 1973
G	10	(Lithuania)	Purlys, Martynas	1.93 m (6 ft 4 in)	85 kg (187 lb)	53 – 18 July 1971
G	11	(Lithuania)	Palšis, Aurimas	1.91 m (6 ft 3 in)	90 kg (198 lb)	56 – 7 September 1968
F	12	(Lithuania)	Vaičiūnas, Rolandas	2.00 m (6 ft 7 in)	93 kg (205 lb)	49 – 4 July 1975
G	13	(Lithuania)	Skaisgirys, Rolandas	1.92 m (6 ft 4 in)	93 kg (205 lb)	56 – 19 February 1969
F	14	(Lithuania)	Janišius, Marius	2.02 m (6 ft 8 in)	93 kg (205 lb)	47 – 1 October 1977
G	15	(Lithuania)	Sirvydis, Virginijus	1.96 m (6 ft 5 in)	90 kg (198 lb)	51 – 23 August 1973
G		(Lithuania)	Šakalys, Andrius	1.95 m (6 ft 5 in)		44 – 9 April 1980

Head coach

- (Lithuania) Modestas Paulauskas
- (Lithuania) Alfredas Vainauskas

Legend

- (C) Team captain
- Injured

- Roster

== 1998-99 Saporta Cup season ==
BC Lietuvos Rytas roster
Players
Coaches

Pos.	No.	Nat.	Name	Ht.	Wt.	Age
PF	4	(Lithuania)	Kazlauskas, Arnas	2.04 m (6 ft 8 in)	104 kg (229 lb)	49 – 11 March 1976
G	6	(Lithuania)	Purlys, Martynas	1.93 m (6 ft 4 in)	85 kg (187 lb)	53 – 18 July 1971
C	7	(Lithuania)	Tribė, Singaras	2.07 m (6 ft 9 in)	90 kg (198 lb)	54 – 2 November 1970
F	7	(Lithuania)	Mikalajūnas, Egidijus	1.99 m (6 ft 6 in)		53 – 24 February 1972
C	8	(Russia)	Safronov, Roman	2.13 m (7 ft 0 in)	112 kg (247 lb)	53 – 13 August 1971
SG	9	(Lithuania)	Giedraitis, Andrius	1.96 m (6 ft 5 in)	86 kg (190 lb)	51 – 23 July 1973
SG	10	(Lithuania)	Kurtinaitis, Rimas	1.96 m (6 ft 5 in)		64 – 15 May 1960
G	11	(Lithuania)	Palšis, Aurimas	1.91 m (6 ft 3 in)	90 kg (198 lb)	56 – 7 September 1968
PF	12	(Lithuania)	Dimavičius, Darius	2.06 m (6 ft 9 in)	112 kg (247 lb)	56 – 8 April 1968
PG	13	(Lithuania)	Jasikevičius, Šarūnas	1.93 m (6 ft 4 in)	89 kg (196 lb)	49 – 5 March 1976
C	14	(Lithuania)	Vyšniauskas, Andrius	2.06 m (6 ft 9 in)	101 kg (223 lb)	51 – 16 September 1973
G/F	15	(Lithuania)	Šiškauskas, Ramūnas	1.96 m (6 ft 5 in)	80 kg (176 lb)	46 – 10 September 1978
PF		(Senegal)	N'Diaye, Makhtar	2.08 m (6 ft 10 in)		51 – 12 December 1973
PG		(Lithuania)	Kemzūra, Kęstutis	1.91 m (6 ft 3 in)		54 – 20 April 1970
SG		(Lithuania)	Sirvydis, Virginijus	1.95 m (6 ft 5 in)		51 – 23 August 1973

Head coach

- (Lithuania) Alfredas Vainauskas
- (Lithuania) Šarūnas Sakalauskas

Legend

- (C) Team captain
- Injured

- Roster

== 1999-00 Saporta Cup season ==
BC Lietuvos Rytas roster
Players
Coaches

Pos.	No.	Nat.	Name	Ht.	Wt.	Age
PF	4	(Lithuania)	Kazlauskas, Arnas	2.04 m (6 ft 8 in)	104 kg (229 lb)	49 – 11 March 1976
SF	5	(Lithuania)	Šležas, Andrius	1.98 m (6 ft 6 in)	91 kg (201 lb)	50 – 4 February 1975
SG	6	(Lithuania)	Kadžiulis, Gintaras	1.93 m (6 ft 4 in)	84 kg (185 lb)	44 – 29 March 1980
SG	7	(Lithuania)	Macijauskas, Arvydas	1.92 m (6 ft 4 in)	90 kg (198 lb)	45 – 19 January 1980
G/F	8	(Lithuania)	Šiškauskas, Ramūnas	1.96 m (6 ft 5 in)	87 kg (192 lb)	46 – 10 September 1978
SG	9	(Lithuania)	Giedraitis, Andrius	1.96 m (6 ft 5 in)	93 kg (205 lb)	51 – 23 July 1973
C	11	(Ukraine)	Okunsky, Oleksandr	2.15 m (7 ft 1 in)	127 kg (280 lb)	53 – 13 July 1971
PF	12	(Lithuania)	Aidietis, Giedrius	2.03 m (6 ft 8 in)	104 kg (229 lb)	50 – 12 March 1975
PG	13	(Lithuania)	Jarutis, Rolandas	1.84 m (6 ft 0 in)	87 kg (192 lb)	48 – 22 May 1976
PG	14	(United States)	Elliott, Eric	1.82 m (6 ft 0 in)	82 kg (181 lb)	55 – 26 September 1969
C	15	(Lithuania)	Javtokas, Robertas	2.10 m (6 ft 11 in)	100 kg (220 lb)	45 – 20 March 1980
PG		(Lithuania)	Česnauskis, Mantas	1.87 m (6 ft 2 in)		43 – 22 July 1981
C		(Belarus)	Cetovic, Valerij	2.08 m (6 ft 10 in)		44 – 9 September 1980
C		(Serbia)	Šilobad, Mlađan	2.08 m (6 ft 10 in)		53 – 6 July 1971
C		(Lithuania)	Vyšniauskas, Andrius	2.06 m (6 ft 9 in)		51 – 16 September 1973

Head coach

- (Lithuania) Alfredas Vainauskas
- (Lithuania) Šarūnas Sakalauskas

Assistant coach(es)

- (Lithuania) Rolandas Čėsna

Legend

- (C) Team captain
- Injured

- Roster

== 2000-01 Suproleague season ==
BC Lietuvos Rytas roster
Players
Coaches

Pos.	No.	Nat.	Name	Ht.	Wt.	Age
PF	4	(Lithuania)	Kazlauskas, Arnas	2.04 m (6 ft 8 in)	104 kg (229 lb)	49 – 11 March 1976
F	5	(Lithuania)	Šležas, Andrius	1.98 m (6 ft 6 in)	91 kg (201 lb)	50 – 4 February 1975
PF	6	(Lithuania)	Šeštokas, Kęstutis	2.03 m (6 ft 8 in)	98 kg (216 lb)	48 – 15 April 1976
SG	7	(Lithuania)	Macijauskas, Arvydas	1.92 m (6 ft 4 in)	97 kg (214 lb)	45 – 19 January 1980
G/F	8	(Lithuania)	Šiškauskas, Ramūnas	1.98 m (6 ft 6 in)	87 kg (192 lb)	46 – 10 September 1978
SG	9	(Lithuania)	Giedraitis, Andrius	1.96 m (6 ft 5 in)	93 kg (205 lb)	51 – 23 July 1973
SG	10	(Lithuania)	Kadžiulis, Gintaras	1.93 m (6 ft 4 in)	84 kg (185 lb)	44 – 29 March 1980
C	11	(United States)	Grant, Greg	2.08 m (6 ft 10 in)	104 kg (229 lb)	54 – 20 March 1971
PF	12	(Lithuania)	Javtokas, Artūras	2.05 m (6 ft 9 in)	105 kg (231 lb)	48 – 27 January 1977
PG	13	(Lithuania)	Jarutis, Rolandas	1.84 m (6 ft 0 in)	87 kg (192 lb)	48 – 22 May 1976
PG	14	(United States)	Elliott, Eric	1.82 m (6 ft 0 in)	82 kg (181 lb)	55 – 26 September 1969
C	15	(Lithuania)	Javtokas, Robertas	2.08 m (6 ft 10 in)	108 kg (238 lb)	45 – 20 March 1980

Head coach

- (Lithuania) Alfredas Vainauskas
- (Lithuania) Šarūnas Sakalauskas

Assistant coach(es)

- (Lithuania) Rolandas Čėsna

Legend

- (C) Team captain
- Injured

- Roster

== 2001-02 Saporta Cup season ==
BC Lietuvos Rytas roster
Players
Coaches

Pos.	No.	Nat.	Name	Ht.	Wt.	Age
PG	4	(Lithuania)	Česnauskis, Mantas	1.87 m (6 ft 2 in)	81 kg (179 lb)	43 – 22 July 1981
F	5	(Lithuania)	Šležas, Andrius	1.98 m (6 ft 6 in)	85 kg (187 lb)	50 – 4 February 1975
PF	6	(Lithuania)	Šeštokas, Kęstutis	2.02 m (6 ft 8 in)	97 kg (214 lb)	48 – 15 April 1976
SG	7	(Lithuania)	Macijauskas, Arvydas	1.92 m (6 ft 4 in)	95 kg (209 lb)	45 – 19 January 1980
G/F	8	(Lithuania)	Šiškauskas, Ramūnas	1.98 m (6 ft 6 in)	90 kg (198 lb)	46 – 10 September 1978
SF	9	(Lithuania)	Kiaušas, Aivaras	1.99 m (6 ft 6 in)	88 kg (194 lb)	44 – 19 May 1980
G	10	(Bosnia and Herzegovina)	Bosnić, Vedran	1.87 m (6 ft 2 in)	86 kg (190 lb)	48 – 4 June 1976
PG	10	(United States)	Jordan, Walsh	1.84 m (6 ft 0 in)	87 kg (192 lb)	52 – 4 May 1972
C	11	(Lithuania)	Vyšniauskas, Andrius	2.07 m (6 ft 9 in)	105 kg (231 lb)	51 – 16 September 1973
PF	12	(Lithuania)	Javtokas, Artūras	2.07 m (6 ft 9 in)	110 kg (243 lb)	48 – 27 January 1977
SF	13	(Lithuania)	Jasaitis, Simas	2.00 m (6 ft 7 in)	87 kg (192 lb)	42 – 26 March 1982
SG	14	(Lithuania)	Kaukėnas, Rimantas	1.94 m (6 ft 4 in)		47 – 11 April 1977
C	15	(Lithuania)	Javtokas, Robertas	2.10 m (6 ft 11 in)	106 kg (234 lb)	45 – 20 March 1980
PG		(Lithuania)	Marčiulionis, Kęstutis	1.88 m (6 ft 2 in)		47 – 15 April 1977

Head coach

- (Lithuania) Alfredas Vainauskas
- (Lithuania) Jonas Kazlauskas

Assistant coach(es)

- (Lithuania) Alfredas Vainauskas
- (Lithuania) Rimantas Endrijaitis

Legend

- (C) Team captain
- Injured

- Roster

== 2002-03 Champions Cup season ==
BC Lietuvos Rytas roster
Players
Coaches

Pos.	No.	Nat.	Name	Ht.	Wt.	Age
F	5	(Lithuania)	Šležas, Andrius (C)	2.00 m (6 ft 7 in)		50 – 4 February 1975
SG	7	(Lithuania)	Macijauskas, Arvydas	1.92 m (6 ft 4 in)		45 – 19 January 1980
G/F	8	(Lithuania)	Šiškauskas, Ramūnas	1.98 m (6 ft 6 in)		46 – 10 September 1978
PG	9	(Lithuania)	Delininkaitis, Tomas	1.90 m (6 ft 3 in)		42 – 11 June 1982
C	10	(Lithuania)	Čukinas, Povilas	2.09 m (6 ft 10 in)		41 – 11 April 1983
C	11	(Ukraine)	Okunsky, Oleksandr	2.14 m (7 ft 0 in)		53 – 13 July 1971
PF	12	(Lithuania)	Javtokas, Artūras	2.07 m (6 ft 9 in)		48 – 27 January 1977
SF	13	(Lithuania)	Jasaitis, Simas	2.02 m (6 ft 8 in)		42 – 26 March 1982
PG	14	(United States)	Lucas, Aaron	1.84 m (6 ft 0 in)		45 – 14 December 1979
C	15	(Lithuania)	Kuzminskas, Saulius	2.10 m (6 ft 11 in)		42 – 30 May 1982
G		(Croatia)	Krstić, Vladimir	1.84 m (6 ft 0 in)		52 – 27 July 1972
SF		(Lithuania)	Kiaušas, Aivaras	1.99 m (6 ft 6 in)		44 – 19 May 1980
PF		(Lithuania)	Šeštokas, Kęstutis	2.02 m (6 ft 8 in)		48 – 15 April 1976
G		(United States)	Woodberry, Steve	1.92 m (6 ft 4 in)		53 – 9 October 1971

Head coach

- (Lithuania) Jonas Kazlauskas

Assistant coach(es)

Legend

- (C) Team captain
- Injured

- Roster

== 2003-04 ULEB Cup season ==
BC Lietuvos Rytas roster
Players
Coaches

Pos.	No.	Nat.	Name	Ht.	Wt.	Age
G/F	4	(Lithuania)	Lukauskis, Mindaugas	1.98 m (6 ft 6 in)		45 – 19 May 1979
SG	5	(Lithuania)	Babrauskas, Steponas	1.97 m (6 ft 6 in)		40 – 20 June 1984
PG	6	(Lithuania)	Delininkaitis, Tomas	1.90 m (6 ft 3 in)		42 – 11 June 1982
F	7	(Lithuania)	Šležas, Andrius (C)	2.00 m (6 ft 7 in)		50 – 4 February 1975
G/F	8	(Lithuania)	Šiškauskas, Ramūnas	1.98 m (6 ft 6 in)		46 – 10 September 1978
C	10	(Lithuania)	Čukinas, Povilas	2.09 m (6 ft 10 in)		41 – 11 April 1983
C	11	(Lithuania)	Kuzminskas, Saulius	2.10 m (6 ft 11 in)		42 – 30 May 1982
PF	12	(United States)	Simpkins, Dickey	2.05 m (6 ft 9 in)		52 – 6 April 1972
SF	13	(Lithuania)	Jasaitis, Simas	2.02 m (6 ft 8 in)		42 – 26 March 1982
PG	14	(United States)	Lucas, Aaron	1.84 m (6 ft 0 in)		45 – 14 December 1979
C	15	(Lithuania)	Javtokas, Robertas	2.11 m (6 ft 11 in)		45 – 20 March 1980
PF	18	(Serbia and Montenegro)	Goljović, Milan	2.03 m (6 ft 8 in)		53 – 27 August 1971

Head coach

- (Lithuania) Jonas Kazlauskas
- (Lithuania) Kęstutis Kemzūra

Assistant coach(es)

Legend

- (C) Team captain
- Injured

- Roster

== 2004-05 ULEB Cup season ==
BC Lietuvos Rytas roster
Players
Coaches

Pos.	No.	Nat.	Name	Ht.	Wt.	Age
G/F	4	(Lithuania)	Lukauskis, Mindaugas	1.98 m (6 ft 6 in)		45 – 19 May 1979
F	5	(Lithuania)	Šležas, Andrius (C)	2.00 m (6 ft 7 in)		50 – 4 February 1975
PF	6	(Lithuania)	Šeštokas, Kęstutis	2.02 m (6 ft 8 in)		48 – 15 April 1976
PG	7	(Latvia)	Štelmahers, Roberts	1.91 m (6 ft 3 in)		50 – 19 November 1974
SF	8	(United States)	House, Fred	1.93 m (6 ft 4 in)		47 – 4 January 1978
PG	9	(Lithuania)	Delininkaitis, Tomas	1.90 m (6 ft 3 in)		42 – 11 June 1982
C	10	(Lithuania)	Čukinas, Povilas	2.09 m (6 ft 10 in)		41 – 11 April 1983
C	11	(Lithuania)	Kuzminskas, Saulius	2.10 m (6 ft 11 in)		42 – 30 May 1982
PF	12	(Bosnia and Herzegovina)	Mujezinović, Haris	2.05 m (6 ft 9 in)		51 – 21 January 1974
SF	13	(Lithuania)	Jasaitis, Simas	2.02 m (6 ft 8 in)		42 – 26 March 1982
C	15	(Lithuania)	Javtokas, Robertas	2.10 m (6 ft 11 in)		45 – 20 March 1980
PG	16	(United States)	Lucas, Aaron	1.84 m (6 ft 0 in)		45 – 14 December 1979
PF	33	(United States)	Nesby, Tyrone	2.03 m (6 ft 8 in)		49 – 31 January 1976
C	41	(Lithuania)	Einikis, Gintaras	2.08 m (6 ft 10 in)		55 – 30 September 1969
PG	44	(Lithuania)	Jarutis, Rolandas	1.83 m (6 ft 0 in)		48 – 22 May 1976

Head coach

- (Serbia) Vlade Đurović
- (Slovenia) Tomo Mahorić

Assistant coach(es)

- (Lithuania) Rūtenis Paulauskas

Legend

- (C) Team captain
- Injured

- Roster

== 2005-06 Euroleague season ==
BC Lietuvos Rytas roster
Players
Coaches

Pos.	No.	Nat.	Name	Ht.	Wt.	Age
SG	0	(Croatia)	Tomas, Ivan	1.93 m (6 ft 4 in)	81 kg (179 lb)	44 – 15 March 1981
G/F	4	(Lithuania)	Lukauskis, Mindaugas	1.98 m (6 ft 6 in)	92 kg (203 lb)	45 – 19 May 1979
F	5	(Lithuania)	Šležas, Andrius (C)	2.00 m (6 ft 7 in)	97 kg (214 lb)	50 – 4 February 1975
PG	7	(Latvia)	Štelmahers, Roberts	1.90 m (6 ft 3 in)	87 kg (192 lb)	50 – 19 November 1974
SF	8	(United States)	House, Fred	1.93 m (6 ft 4 in)	97 kg (214 lb)	47 – 4 January 1978
PG	9	(Lithuania)	Delininkaitis, Tomas	1.90 m (6 ft 3 in)	80 kg (176 lb)	42 – 11 June 1982
C	10	(Lithuania)	Čukinas, Povilas	2.09 m (6 ft 10 in)	110 kg (243 lb)	41 – 11 April 1983
G/F	11	(Lithuania)	Ežerskis, Ernestas	1.92 m (6 ft 4 in)		37 – 5 May 1987
PF	12	(Bosnia and Herzegovina)	Mujezinović, Haris	2.05 m (6 ft 9 in)	112 kg (247 lb)	51 – 21 January 1974
SF	13	(Lithuania)	Jasaitis, Simas	2.02 m (6 ft 8 in)	93 kg (205 lb)	42 – 26 March 1982
C	15	(Lithuania)	Javtokas, Robertas	2.10 m (6 ft 11 in)	115 kg (254 lb)	45 – 20 March 1980
PG	23	(United States)	Baker, Maurice	1.89 m (6 ft 2 in)	90 kg (198 lb)	45 – 28 July 1979
SG	24	(Latvia)	Buškevics, Sandis	1.90 m (6 ft 3 in)	80 kg (176 lb)	48 – 28 January 1977
PF	44	(Australia)	Nielsen, Matthew	2.08 m (6 ft 10 in)	98 kg (216 lb)	47 – 3 February 1978
SG	55	(Lithuania)	Babrauskas, Steponas	1.97 m (6 ft 6 in)	90 kg (198 lb)	40 – 20 June 1984

Head coach

- (Croatia) Neven Spahija

Assistant coach(es)

- (Lithuania) Robertas Kuncaitis
- (Slovenia) Gašper Okorn

Legend

- (C) Team captain
- Injured

- Roster

== 2006-07 ULEB Cup season ==
BC Lietuvos Rytas roster
Players
Coaches

Pos.	No.	Nat.	Name	Ht.	Wt.	Age
SF	4	(United States)	Rush, Kareem	1.98 m (6 ft 6 in)	98 kg (216 lb)	44 – 30 October 1980
F	5	(Lithuania)	Šležas, Andrius (C)	2.00 m (6 ft 7 in)	98 kg (216 lb)	50 – 4 February 1975
PG	7	(Latvia)	Štelmahers, Roberts	1.90 m (6 ft 3 in)	87 kg (192 lb)	50 – 19 November 1974
G/F	8	(Lithuania)	Lukauskis, Mindaugas	1.98 m (6 ft 6 in)	92 kg (203 lb)	45 – 19 May 1979
PG	9	(Lithuania)	Delininkaitis, Tomas	1.90 m (6 ft 3 in)	80 kg (176 lb)	42 – 11 June 1982
PG	10	(Serbia)	Koljević, Ivan	1.86 m (6 ft 1 in)	87 kg (192 lb)	40 – 30 June 1984
C	11	(Lithuania)	Žukauskas, Eurelijus	2.18 m (7 ft 2 in)	112 kg (247 lb)	51 – 22 August 1973
SF	12	(Lithuania)	Kairys, Evaldas	2.03 m (6 ft 8 in)		34 – 11 October 1990
PF	13	(Brazil)	Batista, Joao Paulo	2.06 m (6 ft 9 in)	120 kg (265 lb)	43 – 29 October 1981
SG	14	(United States)	Emmett, Andre	1.96 m (6 ft 5 in)	104 kg (229 lb)	42 – 27 August 1982
C	15	(Lithuania)	Petravičius, Marijonas	2.08 m (6 ft 10 in)	113 kg (249 lb)	45 – 24 October 1979
SF	21	(Lithuania)	Jomantas, Artūras	1.99 m (6 ft 6 in)	88 kg (194 lb)	39 – 4 May 1985
PG	21	(Lithuania)	Pakamanis, Darius	1.92 m (6 ft 4 in)		43 – 8 September 1981
SG	31	(Lithuania)	Gecevičius, Martynas	1.93 m (6 ft 4 in)	85 kg (187 lb)	36 – 16 May 1988
SG	33	(United States)	Ivory, Titus	1.93 m (6 ft 4 in)	89 kg (196 lb)	47 – 13 August 1977
PF	44	(Australia)	Nielsen, Matthew	2.08 m (6 ft 10 in)	105 kg (231 lb)	47 – 3 February 1978
PG	51	(Latvia)	Blūms, Jānis	1.90 m (6 ft 3 in)	85 kg (187 lb)	42 – 20 April 1982

Head coach

- (Israel) Sharon Drucker
- (Slovenia) Zmago Sagadin
- (Serbia) Aleksandar Trifunović

Assistant coach(es)

- (Lithuania) Arvydas Gronskis
- (Israel) Avner Yaor
- (Serbia) Dušan Gvozdić

Legend

- (C) Team captain
- Injured

- Roster

== 2007-08 Euroleague season ==
BC Lietuvos Rytas roster
Players
Coaches

Pos.	No.	Nat.	Name	Ht.	Wt.	Age
PF	4	(Lithuania)	Buterlevičius, Simas	2.00 m (6 ft 7 in)	87 kg (192 lb)	35 – 18 April 1989
F	5	(Lithuania)	Šležas, Andrius (C)	2.00 m (6 ft 7 in)	97 kg (214 lb)	50 – 4 February 1975
C	6	(United States)	Vroman, Jackson	2.08 m (6 ft 10 in)	103 kg (227 lb)	43 – 6 June 1981
PG	7	(Latvia)	Štelmahers, Roberts	1.91 m (6 ft 3 in)	88 kg (194 lb)	50 – 19 November 1974
SG	8	(Lithuania)	Lukauskis, Mindaugas	1.98 m (6 ft 6 in)	92 kg (203 lb)	45 – 19 May 1979
G	10	(United States)	Price, Hollis	1.86 m (6 ft 1 in)	77 kg (170 lb)	45 – 29 October 1979
C	12	(Lithuania)	Anisimovas, Michailas	2.14 m (7 ft 0 in)	104 kg (229 lb)	40 – 11 October 1984
PF	13	(Brazil)	Batista, Joao Paulo	2.06 m (6 ft 9 in)	123 kg (271 lb)	43 – 29 October 1981
C	15	(Lithuania)	Petravičius, Marijonas	2.08 m (6 ft 10 in)	113 kg (249 lb)	45 – 24 October 1979
SF	21	(Lithuania)	Jomantas, Artūras	2.00 m (6 ft 7 in)	95 kg (209 lb)	39 – 4 May 1985
PG	22	(United States)	Mitchell, Darrel	1.80 m (5 ft 11 in)	80 kg (176 lb)	40 – 3 May 1984
PG	25	(United States)	Jordan, Jared	1.88 m (6 ft 2 in)	82 kg (181 lb)	40 – 14 October 1984
SG	31	(Lithuania)	Gecevičius, Martynas	1.93 m (6 ft 4 in)	87 kg (192 lb)	36 – 16 May 1988
SF	33	(United States)	Eidson, Chuck	2.01 m (6 ft 7 in)	94 kg (207 lb)	44 – 10 October 1980
PF	41	(Lithuania)	Brazdauskis, Lukas	2.03 m (6 ft 8 in)	94 kg (207 lb)	36 – 1 October 1988
C	44	(Australia)	Nielsen, Matthew	2.08 m (6 ft 10 in)	98 kg (216 lb)	47 – 3 February 1978
PF	51	(Bosnia and Herzegovina)	Bajramović, Kenan	2.07 m (6 ft 9 in)	97 kg (214 lb)	43 – 24 May 1981

Head coach

- (Serbia) Aleksandar Trifunović

Assistant coach(es)

- (Lithuania) Arvydas Gronskis
- (Serbia) Ivan Jeremić

Legend

- (C) Team captain
- Injured

- Roster

== 2008-09 Eurocup season ==
BC Lietuvos Rytas roster
Players
Coaches

Pos.	No.	Nat.	Name	Ht.	Wt.	Age
SF	4	(Lithuania)	Buterlevičius, Simas	2.00 m (6 ft 7 in)		35 – 18 April 1989
SG	5	(Lithuania)	Babrauskas, Steponas (C)	1.97 m (6 ft 6 in)	82 kg (181 lb)	40 – 20 June 1984
C	7	(Lithuania)	Šležas, Tautvydas	2.08 m (6 ft 10 in)	110 kg (243 lb)	34 – 31 March 1990
SG	8	(Lithuania)	Lukauskis, Mindaugas	1.96 m (6 ft 5 in)	90 kg (198 lb)	45 – 19 May 1979
PG	9	(Lithuania)	Prekevičius, Marius	1.96 m (6 ft 5 in)	94 kg (207 lb)	40 – 22 May 1984
PF	11	(Montenegro)	Bjelica, Milko	2.08 m (6 ft 10 in)	101 kg (223 lb)	40 – 4 June 1984
C	12	(Lithuania)	Anisimovas, Michailas	2.16 m (7 ft 1 in)	112 kg (247 lb)	40 – 11 October 1984
SF	13	(United States)	Eidson, Chuck	2.01 m (6 ft 7 in)	94 kg (207 lb)	44 – 10 October 1980
PF	14	(Lithuania)	Zavackas, Donatas	2.03 m (6 ft 8 in)	114 kg (251 lb)	44 – 23 April 1980
C	15	(Lithuania)	Petravičius, Marijonas	2.07 m (6 ft 9 in)	110 kg (243 lb)	45 – 24 October 1979
SF	21	(Lithuania)	Jomantas, Artūras	2.00 m (6 ft 7 in)	98 kg (216 lb)	39 – 4 May 1985
SF	22	(Lithuania)	Sinica, Justas	2.03 m (6 ft 8 in)	80 kg (176 lb)	39 – 31 May 1985
SG	31	(Lithuania)	Gecevičius, Martynas	1.93 m (6 ft 4 in)	85 kg (187 lb)	36 – 16 May 1988
PG	33	(Serbia)	Milisavljević, Branko	1.91 m (6 ft 3 in)	89 kg (196 lb)	48 – 21 July 1976
PF	41	(Lithuania)	Brazdauskis, Lukas	2.05 m (6 ft 9 in)	85 kg (187 lb)	36 – 1 October 1988
PF	44	(Australia)	Nielsen, Matthew	2.10 m (6 ft 11 in)	98 kg (216 lb)	47 – 3 February 1978
PG	55	(Lithuania)	Dainys, Evaldas	1.82 m (6 ft 0 in)	90 kg (198 lb)	42 – 29 September 1982

Head coach

- (Lithuania) Antanas Sireika
- (Lithuania) Rimas Kurtinaitis

Assistant coach(es)

- (Lithuania) Arvydas Gronskis
- (Lithuania) Robertas Kuncaitis

Legend

- (C) Team captain
- Injured

- Roster

== 2009-10 Euroleague season ==
BC Lietuvos Rytas roster
Players
Coaches

Pos.	No.	Nat.	Name	Ht.	Wt.	Age
PG	4	(Serbia)	Popović, Bojan	1.91 m (6 ft 3 in)	84 kg (185 lb)	42 – 13 February 1983
SG	5	(Lithuania)	Babrauskas, Steponas (C)	1.97 m (6 ft 6 in)	90 kg (198 lb)	40 – 20 June 1984
PG	9	(Lithuania)	Ginevičius, Vidas	1.94 m (6 ft 4 in)	88 kg (194 lb)	46 – 11 May 1978
PF	10	(Serbia)	Borovnjak, Dejan	2.09 m (6 ft 10 in)	98 kg (216 lb)	38 – 1 April 1986
PG	10	(Greece)	Milošević, Igor	1.93 m (6 ft 4 in)	88 kg (194 lb)	38 – 14 April 1986
PF	11	(Montenegro)	Bjelica, Milko	2.08 m (6 ft 10 in)	112 kg (247 lb)	40 – 4 June 1984
SG	13	(Lithuania)	Gecevičius, Martynas	1.93 m (6 ft 4 in)	93 kg (205 lb)	36 – 16 May 1988
PF	14	(Lithuania)	Zavackas, Donatas	2.03 m (6 ft 8 in)	104 kg (229 lb)	44 – 23 April 1980
SF	15	(Lithuania)	Buterlevičius, Simas	2.00 m (6 ft 7 in)	94 kg (207 lb)	35 – 18 April 1989
C	17	(Lithuania)	Valančiūnas, Jonas	2.10 m (6 ft 11 in)	95 kg (209 lb)	32 – 6 May 1992
SF	21	(Lithuania)	Jomantas, Artūras	2.00 m (6 ft 7 in)	98 kg (216 lb)	39 – 4 May 1985
SF	22	(Lithuania)	Sinica, Justas	2.03 m (6 ft 8 in)	85 kg (187 lb)	39 – 31 May 1985
C	31	(Australia)	Baynes, Aron	2.08 m (6 ft 10 in)	110 kg (243 lb)	38 – 9 December 1986
PF	41	(Lithuania)	Brazdauskis, Lukas	2.05 m (6 ft 9 in)	101 kg (223 lb)	36 – 1 October 1988
PF	51	(Bosnia and Herzegovina)	Bajramović, Kenan	2.06 m (6 ft 9 in)	103 kg (227 lb)	43 – 24 May 1981
PG	55	(Lithuania)	Dainys, Evaldas	1.82 m (6 ft 0 in)	88 kg (194 lb)	42 – 29 September 1982

Head coach

- (Lithuania) Rimas Kurtinaitis

Assistant coach(es)

- (Lithuania) Arvydas Gronskis
- (Lithuania) Robertas Kuncaitis

Legend

- (C) Team captain
- Injured

- Roster

== 2010-11 Euroleague season ==
BC Lietuvos Rytas roster
Players
Coaches

Pos.	No.	Nat.	Name	Ht.	Wt.	Age
SG	5	(Lithuania)	Babrauskas, Steponas (C)	1.97 m (6 ft 6 in)	90 kg (198 lb)	40 – 20 June 1984
SG	8	(Lithuania)	Šikšnius, Arvydas	1.96 m (6 ft 5 in)	94 kg (207 lb)	37 – 10 October 1987
PG	8	(United States)	Strawberry, D. J.	1.96 m (6 ft 5 in)	93 kg (205 lb)	39 – 15 June 1985
PG	9	(Lithuania)	Kelys, Žydrūnas	1.88 m (6 ft 2 in)	65 kg (143 lb)	37 – 29 April 1987
PG	10	(Serbia)	Rašić, Aleksandar	1.95 m (6 ft 5 in)	90 kg (198 lb)	41 – 16 March 1984
PG	10	(Greece)	Milošević, Igor	1.93 m (6 ft 4 in)	93 kg (205 lb)	38 – 14 April 1986
PF	11	(Montenegro)	Bjelica, Milko	2.08 m (6 ft 10 in)	112 kg (247 lb)	40 – 4 June 1984
SG	13	(Lithuania)	Gecevičius, Martynas	1.93 m (6 ft 4 in)	93 kg (205 lb)	36 – 16 May 1988
SF	15	(Lithuania)	Buterlevičius, Simas	2.00 m (6 ft 7 in)	94 kg (207 lb)	35 – 18 April 1989
C	17	(Lithuania)	Valančiūnas, Jonas	2.10 m (6 ft 11 in)	105 kg (231 lb)	32 – 6 May 1992
SF	20	(Australia)	Newley, Brad	2.01 m (6 ft 7 in)	93 kg (205 lb)	40 – 18 February 1985
SF	21	(Lithuania)	Jomantas, Artūras	2.00 m (6 ft 7 in)	98 kg (216 lb)	39 – 4 May 1985
PG	22	(Lithuania)	Jasikevičius, Šarūnas	1.93 m (6 ft 4 in)	92 kg (203 lb)	49 – 5 March 1976
C	25	(Turkey)	Nalga, Cemal	2.08 m (6 ft 10 in)	110 kg (243 lb)	37 – 16 September 1987
C	31	(Lithuania)	Baločka, Petras	2.05 m (6 ft 9 in)	117 kg (258 lb)	38 – 10 August 1986
SF	33	(Lithuania)	Jasaitis, Simas	2.02 m (6 ft 8 in)	95 kg (209 lb)	42 – 26 March 1982
PG	42	(United States)	El-Amin, Khalid	1.78 m (5 ft 10 in)	89 kg (196 lb)	45 – 25 April 1979
PF	51	(Bosnia and Herzegovina)	Bajramović, Kenan	2.06 m (6 ft 9 in)	103 kg (227 lb)	43 – 24 May 1981
C	55	(Lithuania)	Petrukonis, Karolis	2.12 m (6 ft 11 in)	115 kg (254 lb)	37 – 18 May 1987
PG	55	(United States)	Johnson, Jerry	1.83 m (6 ft 0 in)	83 kg (183 lb)	42 – 23 April 1982

Head coach

- (Croatia) Dražen Anzulović
- (Serbia) Aleksandar Trifunović
- (Lithuania) Darius Maskoliūnas

Assistant coach(es)

- (Lithuania) Arvydas Gronskis
- (Lithuania) Marius Linartas
- (Latvia) Roberts Štelmahers

Legend

- (C) Team captain
- Injured

- Roster

== 2011-12 Eurocup season ==
Lietuvos rytas roster
Players
Coaches

Pos.	No.	Nat.	Name	Ht.	Wt.	Age
G	4	(Lithuania)	Dambrauskas, Paulius	1.91 m (6 ft 3 in)	83 kg (183 lb)	33 – 16 December 1991
G/F	5	(Lithuania)	Babrauskas, Steponas (C)	1.97 m (6 ft 6 in)	95 kg (209 lb)	40 – 20 June 1984
PG	6	(United States)	Rice, Tyrese	1.85 m (6 ft 1 in)	86 kg (190 lb)	37 – 15 May 1987
PF	7	(United States)	Roberts, Lawrence	2.06 m (6 ft 9 in)	109 kg (240 lb)	42 – 20 October 1982
SG	8	(Montenegro)	Jeretin, Goran	1.92 m (6 ft 4 in)	95 kg (209 lb)	45 – 17 September 1979
SG	10	(Lithuania)	Seibutis, Renaldas	1.95 m (6 ft 5 in)	82 kg (181 lb)	39 – 23 July 1985
PF	12	(Lithuania)	Dilys, Vilmantas	2.08 m (6 ft 10 in)	104 kg (229 lb)	37 – 6 October 1987
C	14	(North Macedonia)	Samardžiski, Predrag	2.14 m (7 ft 0 in)	110 kg (243 lb)	38 – 11 April 1986
PF	15	(Lithuania)	Katelynas, Mindaugas	2.06 m (6 ft 9 in)	102 kg (225 lb)	41 – 16 May 1983
C	17	(Lithuania)	Valančiūnas, Jonas	2.10 m (6 ft 11 in)	105 kg (231 lb)	32 – 6 May 1992
G	19	(Serbia)	Rašić, Aleksandar	1.95 m (6 ft 5 in)	90 kg (198 lb)	41 – 16 March 1984
SF	20	(Australia)	Newley, Brad	2.00 m (6 ft 7 in)	93 kg (205 lb)	40 – 18 February 1985
SF	21	(Lithuania)	Jomantas, Artūras	2.00 m (6 ft 7 in)	105 kg (231 lb)	39 – 4 May 1985
G	32	(Lithuania)	Redikas, Dovydas	1.92 m (6 ft 4 in)	90 kg (198 lb)	32 – 11 December 1992

Head coach

- (Serbia) Aleksandar Džikić

Assistant coach(es)

- (Lithuania) Darius Maskoliūnas
- (Lithuania) Arvydas Gronskis
- (Serbia) Srdjan Flajs

Athletic trainer(s)

- (Slovenia) Tomaž Brinec

Legend

- (C) Team captain
- Injured

- Roster

== 2012-13 Euroleague season ==
Lietuvos rytas roster
Players
Coaches

Pos.	No.	Nat.	Name	Ht.	Wt.	Age
G/F	4	(Lithuania)	Dulkys, Deividas	1.96 m (6 ft 5 in)	88 kg (194 lb)	37 – 12 March 1988
SG	5	(Lithuania)	Babrauskas, Steponas (C)	1.97 m (6 ft 6 in)	88 kg (194 lb)	40 – 20 June 1984
C	6	(Lithuania)	Lydeka, Tautvydas	2.08 m (6 ft 10 in)	115 kg (254 lb)	41 – 13 October 1983
C	7	(Croatia)	Zubčić, Tomislav	2.12 m (6 ft 11 in)	105 kg (231 lb)	35 – 17 January 1990
SG	10	(Lithuania)	Seibutis, Renaldas	1.96 m (6 ft 5 in)	82 kg (181 lb)	39 – 23 July 1985
PG	11	(Belize)	Palacio, Milt	1.93 m (6 ft 4 in)	95 kg (209 lb)	47 – 7 February 1978
PF	12	(Lithuania)	Dilys, Vilmantas	2.08 m (6 ft 10 in)	104 kg (229 lb)	37 – 6 October 1987
SF	13	(Lithuania)	Buterlevičius, Simas	2.00 m (6 ft 7 in)	94 kg (207 lb)	35 – 18 April 1989
C	14	(North Macedonia)	Samardžiski, Predrag	2.14 m (7 ft 0 in)	110 kg (243 lb)	38 – 11 April 1986
PF	15	(Lithuania)	Katelynas, Mindaugas	2.06 m (6 ft 9 in)	102 kg (225 lb)	41 – 16 May 1983
G	16	(Serbia)	Nedović, Nemanja	1.91 m (6 ft 3 in)	87 kg (192 lb)	33 – 16 June 1991
SF	21	(Lithuania)	Jomantas, Artūras	2.00 m (6 ft 7 in)	98 kg (216 lb)	39 – 4 May 1985
SF	22	(Lithuania)	Bendžius, Eimantas	2.03 m (6 ft 8 in)	88 kg (194 lb)	34 – 23 April 1990
C	31	(United States)	O'Bryant, Patrick	2.13 m (7 ft 0 in)	113 kg (249 lb)	38 – 20 June 1986
G	32	(Lithuania)	Redikas, Dovydas	1.92 m (6 ft 4 in)	90 kg (198 lb)	32 – 11 December 1992
C	43	(Croatia)	Radošević, Leon	2.09 m (6 ft 10 in)	100 kg (220 lb)	35 – 26 February 1990
PF	44	(Bulgaria)	Ivanov, Dejan	2.05 m (6 ft 9 in)	103 kg (227 lb)	39 – 18 March 1986
PG	45	(Latvia)	Blūms, Jānis	1.91 m (6 ft 3 in)	86 kg (190 lb)	42 – 20 April 1982

Head coach

- (Serbia) Aleksandar Džikić
- (Lithuania) Darius Maskoliūnas
- (Germany) Dirk Bauermann

Assistant coach(es)

- (Lithuania) Arvydas Gronskis
- (Lithuania) Dainius Adomaitis

Athletic trainer(s)

- (Slovenia) Tomaž Brinec

Legend

- (C) Team captain
- Injured

- Roster

== 2017-18 Eurocup season ==
Lietuvos rytas roster
Players
Coaches

Pos.	No.	Nat.	Name	Ht.	Wt.	Age
G	20	(United States)	Baron, Jimmy	1.91 m (6 ft 3 in)	89 kg (196 lb)	38 – 23 May 1986
PG	22	(United States)	Carter, Marc Antonio	1.92 m (6 ft 4 in)	95 kg (209 lb)	39 – 22 May 1985
F/C	4	(United States)	Carter, Robert	2.06 m (6 ft 9 in)	114 kg (251 lb)	30 – 4 April 1994
SF	51	(Lithuania)	Butkevičius, Arnas	1.97 m (6 ft 6 in)	92 kg (203 lb)	32 – 22 October 1992
F/C	14	(Lithuania)	Echodas, Martynas	2.06 m (6 ft 9 in)	102 kg (225 lb)	27 – 7 July 1997
G	31	(Lithuania)	Giedraitis, Rokas	2.00 m (6 ft 7 in)	88 kg (194 lb)	32 – 16 August 1992
PG	18	(Lithuania)	Girdžiūnas, Mindaugas	1.88 m (6 ft 2 in)	86 kg (190 lb)	36 – 20 January 1989
F	21	(Lithuania)	Jomantas, Artūras (C)	2.00 m (6 ft 7 in)	106 kg (234 lb)	39 – 4 May 1985
PG	3	(United States)	Kramer, Chris	1.91 m (6 ft 3 in)	98 kg (216 lb)	36 – 4 April 1988
G/F	8	(Lithuania)	Lukauskis, Mindaugas	1.98 m (6 ft 6 in)	90 kg (198 lb)	45 – 19 May 1979
SG	1	(Australia)	Madgen, Ben	1.93 m (6 ft 4 in)	92 kg (203 lb)	40 – 7 February 1985
C	12	(Greece)	Mavrokefalidis, Loukas	2.10 m (6 ft 11 in)	106 kg (234 lb)	40 – 25 July 1984
C	55	(Lithuania)	Mockevičius, Egidijus	2.08 m (6 ft 10 in)	108 kg (238 lb)	32 – 1 September 1992
PF	42	(United States)	Peterson, Travis	2.08 m (6 ft 10 in)	102 kg (225 lb)	39 – 18 May 1985
PG	2	(Lithuania)	Normantas, Margiris	1.93 m (6 ft 4 in)	91 kg (201 lb)	28 – 27 October 1996
F	0	(Lithuania)	Sirvydis, Deividas	2.02 m (6 ft 8 in)	86 kg (190 lb)	24 – 10 June 2000

Head coach

- (Lithuania) Rimas Kurtinaitis

Assistant coach(es)

- (Lithuania) Robertas Kuncaitis
- (Spain) Alberto Blanco
- (Lithuania) Mindaugas Brazys

Athletic trainer(s)

- (Lithuania) Evaldas Kandratavičius

Doctor

- (Lithuania) Mantas Ambraška

Physiotherapist(s)

- (Lithuania) Juozas Petkevičius

Legend

- (C) Team captain
- Injured

- Roster
