= 2000–01 North European Basketball League =

North European Basketball League
- Season: 2000-2001
- Teams: 16

Regular season
- Season MVP: (Russia) Sergei Chikalkin

Finals
- Champions: (Russia) Ural Great Perm
- Finals MVP: (Russia) Sergei Chikalkin

2000–01 NEBL was the second complete season of the North European Basketball League. The tournament was held during the 2000–01 basketball season on 30 November 2000 – 22 April 2001.

The winner of the NEBL championship was awarded with $45,000 cheque, the other finalist received $25,000, 3rd-place winner - $20,000 and 4th best team got $10,000.

Ural Great won the tournament by defeating Žalgiris in the final.

Sergei Chikalkin from Ural Great was named as the Most valuable player.

== Clubs ==
Country (League)	Teams
Czech Republic (NBL)	USK Erpet Prague
Denmark (Basketligaen)	Magic Great Danes
England (NBL)	Haribo London Towers London
Estonia (KML)	Kalev Tallinn
Finland (Korisliiga)	Honka Playboys Espoo
Latvia (LBL)	Ventspils
Latvia (LBL)	BK LMT Rīga
Lithuania (LKL)	Žalgiris Kaunas
Lithuania (LKL)	Lietuvos rytas Vilnius
Lithuania (LKL)	Šiauliai
Netherlands (DBL)	Conesco Den Helder
Poland (PLK)	Polonia Warbud Warsaw
Russia (Super League A)	Ural Great Perm
Russia (Super League A)	CSKA Moscow
Sweden (Basketligan)	Norrköping Dolphins Norrköping
Ukraine (SuperLeague)	Kyiv Kiev

== Regular season ==
Pos	Team	Pld	W	L	PF	PA	PD	Tie-break
1	(Russia) Ural Great (A)	15	14	1	1402	1081	+321	
2	(Lithuania) Lietuvos rytas (A)	15	12	3	1348	1210	+138	1–0
3	(Lithuania) Žalgiris (B)	15	12	3	1251	1071	+180	0–1
4	(Russia) CSKA (B)	15	11	4	1357	1234	+123	
5	(England) Haribo London Towers (B)	15	9	6	1179	1187	−8	1–0
6	(Poland) Polonia Warbud (B)	15	9	6	1098	1156	−58	0–1
7	(Ukraine) Kyiv (B)	15	8	7	1262	1227	+35	
8	(Latvia) Ventspils (B)	15	7	8	1251	1237	+14	2–0
9	(Latvia) BK LMT (B)	15	7	8	1334	1389	−55	1–1
10	(Lithuania) Šiauliai (B)	15	7	8	1227	1216	+11	0–2
11	(Estonia) Kalev	15	5	10	1106	1304	−198	
12	(Denmark) Magic Great Danes	15	4	11	1082	1217	−135	2–1; 1–0
13	(Finland) Honka Playboys (T)	15	4	11	1179	1278	−99	2–1; 0–1
14	(Netherlands) Conesco (T)	15	4	11	1074	1168	−94	1–2; 1–0
15	(Czech Republic) USK Erpet (T)	15	4	11	1199	1242	−43	1–2; 0–1
16	(Sweden) Norrköping Dolphins (T)	15	3	12	1288	1420	−132	

Source: NEBL
(A) Advance to Final Four; (B) Advance to eight-finals; (T) Transfer to NEBL Challenge Cup

== Results ==
	(Sweden) NOR	(Czech Republic) PRA	(Netherlands) CON	(Finland) HON	(Denmark) MGD	(Estonia) KAL	(Lithuania) ŠIA	(Latvia) LMT	(Latvia) VEN	(Ukraine) KYI	(Poland) POL	(England) HLT	(Russia) CSK	(Lithuania) ŽAL	(Lithuania) LRY
(Russia) Ural Great Perm	109-86	89-65	68-55	113-66	105-72	92-68	93-62	122-92	83-73	99-97	98-60	91-65	78-69	81-68	81-83
(Lithuania) Lietuvos rytas	108-75	87-71	85-79	86-84	81-65	91-67	91-93	82-89	103-94	101-92	90-73	96-79	89-98	75-70	
(Lithuania) Žalgiris Kaunas	97-69	88-85	73-48	93-79	97-68	112-71	72-66	103-81	81-75	72-68	71-54	83-67	71-84		
(Russia) CSKA Moscow	94-101	93-92	87-80	92-91	87-60	107-64	91-81	98-104	101-88	80-88	83-57	93-90			
(England) Haribo London Towers	75-78	77-75	76-69	83-81	65-53	82-67	86-68	86-103	77-75	79-73	92-72				
(Poland) Polonia Warbud	89-82	87-75	83-72	60-52	63-60	65-74	87-69	82-78	72-70	94-90					
(Ukraine) Kyiv	97-92	64-57	82-69	88-74	81-71	87-69	73-92	100-87	82-91						
(Latvia) Ventspils	94-88	87-98	67-64	80-71	69-70	99-80	83-77	106-90							
(Latvia) BK LMT Rīga	90-82	83-104	84-94	77-86	85-73	95-81	96-90								
(Lithuania) Šiauliai	106-89	85-80	63-64	84-71	90-75	91-65									
(Estonia) Kalev	88-87	76-73	76-78	71-67	89-78										
(Denmark) Magic Great Danes	85-77	80-86	82-63	90-79											
(Finland) Honka Playboys	112-102	81-80	85-79												
(Netherlands) Conesco Den Helder	84-91	76-66													
(Czech Republic) USK Erpet Prague	92-89														

Source: Worldbasket.com

== Play-offs ==
=== Eight-finals ===
Team 1	Agg.	Team 2	1st leg	2nd leg
Žalgiris (Lithuania)	147–115	(Lithuania) Šiauliai	84–54	63–61
CSKA (Russia)	207–153	(Latvia) BK LMT	89–70	118–83
Haribo London Towers (England)	167–178	(Latvia) Ventspils	70–97	97–81
Polonia Warbud (Poland)	157–174	(Ukraine) Kyiv	80–83	77–91

=== Quarterfinals ===
Team 1	Agg.	Team 2	1st leg	2nd leg
Žalgiris (Lithuania)	163–147	(Ukraine) Kyiv	77–59	86–88
CSKA (Russia)	190–189	(Latvia) Ventspils	107–104	83–85

== Final Four ==
=== Semifinal 1 ===
21 April 2001
15:45

Boxscore

Ural Great (Russia)	90–56	(Russia) CSKA
Scoring by quarter: 21–13, 25–16, 22–16, 22–11
Pts: Chikalkin 21; Rebs: Mikhailov 12; Asts: Panov, Pačėsas 6		Pts: Rogers 20; Rebs: Rogers 11; Asts: three players 2

Universal Sports Palace Molot, Perm
Attendance: 7,000
Referees: Efim Resser (GER), Volodymyr Drabikovskyi (UKR)

=== Semifinal 2 ===
21 April 2001
18:30

Boxscore

Lietuvos rytas (Lithuania)	79–107	(Lithuania) Žalgiris
Scoring by quarter: 23–33, 17–27, 18–14, 21–33
Pts: Šeštokas, A. Javtokas 14; Rebs: Šeštokas 9 Asts: Šiškauskas 4		Pts: Slanina 30; Rebs: Marčiulionis 8 Asts: Marčiulionis 8

Universal Sports Palace Molot, Perm
Attendance: 6,000
Referees: Ivan Zachara (CZE), Nikolaos Mpotitsis (SWE)

=== Third-place game ===
22 April 2001
15:00

Boxscore

Lietuvos rytas (Lithuania)	103–74	(Russia) CSKA
Scoring by quarter: 29–24, 25–15, 29–14, 20–21
Pts: Šležas 21; Rebs: A. Javtokas 12; Asts: Elliott 7		Pts: Rogers 19; Rebs: Rogers 12; Asts: LaRue 3

Universal Sports Palace Molot, Perm
Attendance: 6,500
Referees: Efim Resser (GER), Nikolaos Mpotitsis (SWE)

=== Final ===
22 April 2001
17:45

Boxscore

Ural Great (Russia)	88–81	(Lithuania) Žalgiris
Scoring by quarter: 19–22, 24–16, 18–13, 27–30
Pts: Chikalkin 38; Rebs: Panov 13; Asts: Pačėsas 6		Pts: Woodberry 21; Rebs: Khizhnyak, Woodberry, Slanina 5 Asts: Woodberry 2

Universal Sports Palace Molot, Perm
Attendance: 7,500
Referees: Ivan Zachara (CZE), Volodymyr Drabikovskyi (UKR)

== Final standings ==
Pos	Team
1	Ural Great
2	Žalgiris
3	Lietuvos rytas
4	CSKA
5	Kyiv
6	Ventspils
7	Haribo London Towers
8	Polonia Warbud
9	BK LMT
10	Šiauliai
11	Kalev
12	Magic Great Danes
13	Honka Playboys
14	Conesco
15	USK Erpet
16	Norrköping Dolphins

Updated to match(es) played on unknown. Source:

== NEBL Challenge Cup'2001 ==
Challenge Cup was second-tier competition for clubs, that wanted to be promoted to first-tier NEBL tournament (Championship). Four NEBL Championship worst teams transferred to NEBL Challenge Cup'2001 Second stage.

=== Clubs ===
Country (League)	Teams
Belarus (Premier League)	Grodno-93 Grodno
Belarus (Premier League)	RTI Minsk
England (NBL)	Pertemps Bullets Birmingham
Estonia (KML)	Tartu Ülikool/Delta Tartu
Estonia (KML)	Hotronic Tallinn
Estonia (KML)	Nybit Tallinn
(Georgia (country)) Georgia (Superliga)	BASCO Batumi
Germany (BBL)	s.Oliver Würzburg
Lithuania (LKL)	Alita Alytus
Norway (BLNO)	Ulriken Eagles Bergen
Russia (Super League A)	Spartak Saint Petersburg
Sweden (Basketligan)	Södertälje Kings Södertälje
Sweden (Basketligan)	Sundsvall Dragons Sundsvall
Ukraine (SuperLeague)	Odesa

=== First stage ===
==== Group A ====
All games played in Batumi from 16 to 18 February 2001.

Pos	Team	Pld	W	L	PF	PA	PD	Tie-break
1	(Georgia (country)) BASCO (A)	3	3	0	241	205	+36	
2	(Belarus) Grodno-93 (A)	3	2	1	240	215	+25	
3	(Estonia) Tartu Ülikool/Delta (A)	3	1	2	223	225	−2	
4	(Estonia) Nybit	3	0	3	182	241	−59	

(A) Advance to second stage

==== Group B ====
All games played in Bergen from 17 to 19 February 2001.

Pos	Team	Pld	W	L	PF	PA	PD	Tie-break
1	(Germany) s.Oliver (A)	3	3	0	264	207	+57	
2	(Norway) Ulriken Eagles (A)	3	1	2	247	250	−3	1–1, +14
3	(England) Pertemps Bullets (A)	3	1	2	208	222	−14	1–1, 0
4	(Estonia) Hotronic (A)	3	1	2	187	227	−40	1–1, -14

(A) Advance to second stage

==== Group C ====
All games played in Odesa from 21 to 23 February 2001.

Pos	Team	Pld	W	L	PF	PA	PD	Tie-break
1	(Ukraine) Odesa (A)	3	3	0	278	223	+55	
2	(Lithuania) Alita (A)	3	2	1	296	280	+16	
3	(Russia) Spartak (A)	3	1	2	262	248	+14	
4	(Belarus) RTI	3	0	3	245	330	−85	

(A) Advance to second stage

==== Ranking of fourth-placed teams ====
Pos	Grp	Team	Pld	W	L	PF	PA	PD	Pts	Qualification
1	B	(Estonia) Hotronic	3	1	2	187	227	−40	4	Advance to Second stage
2	A	(Estonia) Nybit	3	0	3	182	241	−59	3	
3	C	(Belarus) RTI	3	0	3	245	330	−85	3	

Source: NEBL

=== Second stage ===
==== Group D ====
All games played in Södertälje from 19 to 20 March 2001.

Semifinals

Team 1	Score	Team 2
Södertälje Kings (Sweden)	89–75	(Netherlands) Conesco
BASCO (Georgia (country))	86–114	(Lithuania) Alita

Third-place game

Team 1	Score	Team 2
Conesco (Netherlands)	82–74	(Georgia (country)) BASCO

Final

Team 1	Score	Team 2
Södertälje Kings (Sweden)	86–90	(Lithuania) Alita

==== Group E ====
All games played in Grodno from 26 to 27 March 2001.

Semifinals

Team 1	Score	Team 2
Spartak (Russia)	86–74	(Czech Republic) USK Erpet
s.Oliver (Germany)	84–65	(Belarus) Grodno-93

Third-place game

Team 1	Score	Team 2
USK Erpet (Czech Republic)	72–93	(Belarus) Grodno-93

Final

Team 1	Score	Team 2
Spartak (Russia)	90–68	(Germany) s.Oliver

==== Group F ====
All games played in Tartu from 14 to 15 March 2001.

Semifinals

Team 1	Score	Team 2
Odesa (Ukraine)	63–57	(Norway) Ulriken Eagles
Tartu Ülikool/Delta (Estonia)	78–76	(Sweden) Norrköping Dolphins

Third-place game

Team 1	Score	Team 2
Norrköping Dolphins (Sweden)	97–63	(Norway) Ulriken Eagles

Final

Team 1	Score	Team 2
Odesa (Ukraine)	87–77	(Estonia) Tartu Ülikool/Delta

==== Group G ====
All games played in Birmingham from 20 to 21 March 2001.

Semifinals

Team 1	Score	Team 2
Sundsvall Dragons (Sweden)	88–100	(England) Pertemps Bullets
Hotronic (Estonia)	67–84	(Finland) Honka Playboys

Third-place game

Team 1	Score	Team 2
Hotronic (Estonia)	74–60	(Sweden) Sundsvall Dragons

Final

Team 1	Score	Team 2
Honka Playboys (Finland)	67–80	(England) Pertemps Bullets

=== Final Four ===
Final Four was held in Odesa from 27 to 28 April 2001.
Spartak withdraw. It was replaced with Grodno-93 by NEBL decision.
Yorick Williams (Pertemps Bullets) was named the MVP of the Final Four.

Semifinals

Team 1	Score	Team 2
Odesa (Ukraine)	102–93 OT	(England) Pertemps Bullets
Alita (Lithuania)	92–88	(Belarus) Grodno-93

Third-place game

Team 1	Score	Team 2
Pertemps Bullets (England)	83–86	(Belarus) Grodno-93

Final

Team 1	Score	Team 2
Odesa (Ukraine)	98–82	(Lithuania) Alita

=== Final standings ===
Pos	Team
1	Odesa
2	Alita
3	Grodno-93
4	Pertemps Bullets
5	Spartak
6	Honka Playboys
6	s.Oliver
6	Södertälje Kings
6	Tartu Ülikool/Delta
10	Conesco
10	Norrköping Dolphins
10	Hotronic
13	USK Erpet
13	BASCO
13	Ulriken Eagles
13	Sundsvall Dragons
17	Nybit
18	RTI

Updated to match(es) played on unknown. Source:
