= Brazdauskis =

Brazdauskis is the masculine form of a Lithuanian family name. Notable people with the surname include:

- Lukas Brazdauskis (born 1988), Lithuanian basketball player
- Romanas Brazdauskis (born 1964), Lithuanian basketball player, father of Lukas
