= Laurynas Samėnas =

Lithuanian basketball player (born 1988)

BC Ežerūnas
- Position: Shooting guard
- League: NKL

Personal information
- Born: October 12, 1988 (age 38) Panevėžys, Lithuanian SSR, Soviet Union
- Listed height: 6 ft 3.75 in (1.92 m)
- Listed weight: 180 lb (82 kg)

Career information
- Playing career: 2006–present

Career history
- 2006–2008: SSK-Perlas Vilnius
- 2008–2009: Sakalai Vilnius
- 2009: Šiauliai
- 2009–2010: Sakalai Vilnius
- 2010–2011: Perlas Vilnius
- 2011–2012: Sakalai Vilnius
- 2012–2013: Triobet Šiauliai
- 2013–2015: TBB Trier
- 2015: Pieno Žvaigždės Pasvalys
- 2015–2016: Juventus Utena
- 2016–2017: Atomerőmű SE
- 2017–2018: Juventus Utena
- 2018–2019: Basketball Löwen Erfurt
- 2019–2020: Swiss Central Basket
- 2020: BC Vytis
- 2020-: BC Ežerūnas

Laurynas Samėnas (born October 12, 1988) is a Lithuanian professional basketball player.
