= Ežerskis =

- Lithuanian surname
- m.: Ežerskis
- f.: (unmarried): Ežerskytė
- f.: (married): Ežerskienė

Ežerskis is a Lithuanian surname. Notable people with the surname include:

- Ernestas Ežerskis (born 1987), Lithuanian professional basketball player
- Mindaugas Ežerskis (born 1977), Lithuanian wrestler
