= Dilys (disambiguation) =

Dilys is a feminine given name and virtue name

Dilys may also refer to:

- Dilys (surname), Lithuanian surname
- Dilys Award, awarded by the Independent Mystery Booksellers Association
