= Aaron Lucas =

American basketball player

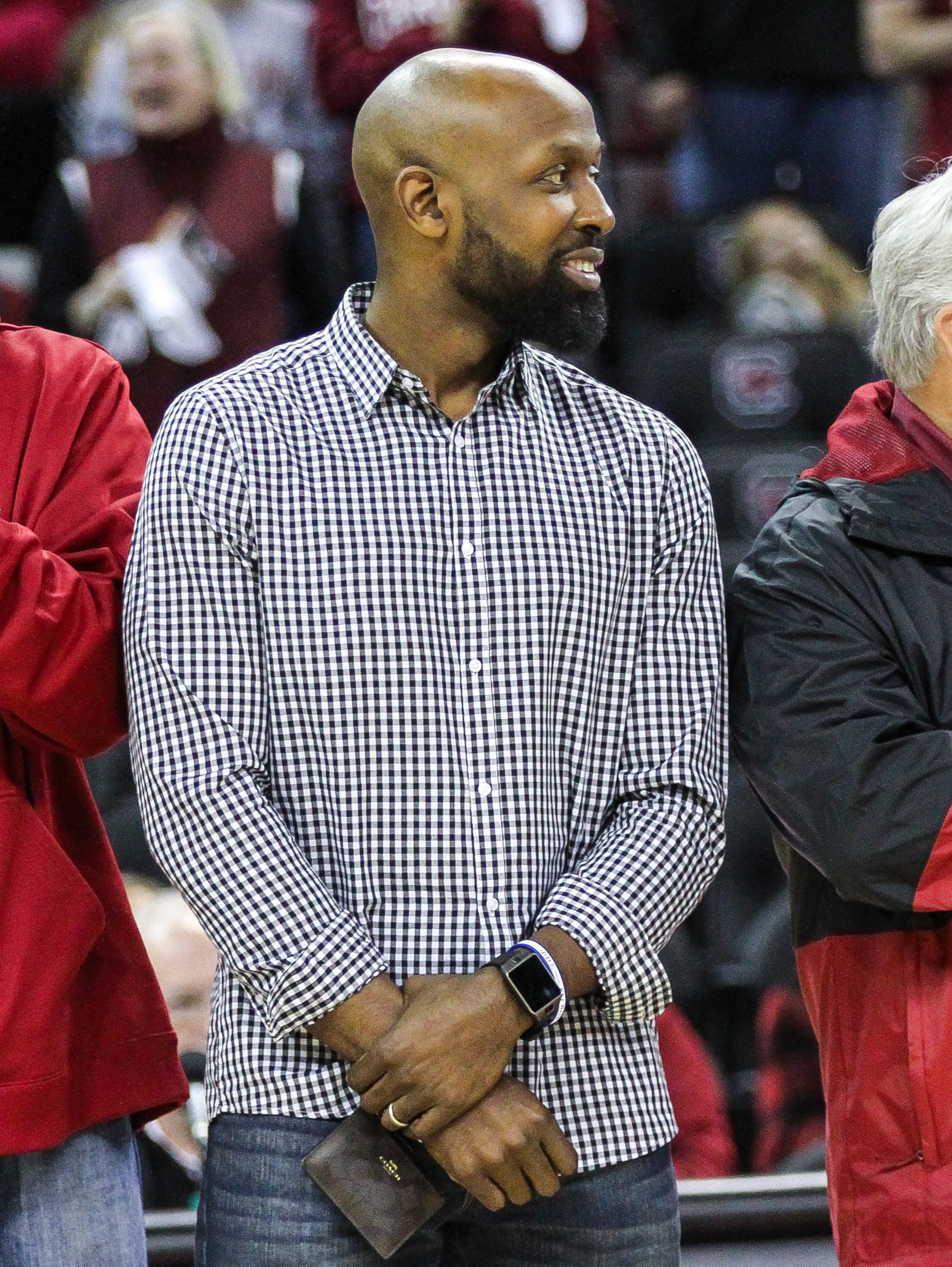

Personal information
- Born: December 14, 1979 (age 46) Greenville, South Carolina, U.S.
- Listed height: 6 ft 1.5 in (1.87 m)
- Listed weight: 195 lb (88 kg)

Career information
- High school: Richland Northeast (Columbia, South Carolina)
- College: South Carolina (1998–2002)
- NBA draft: 2002: undrafted
- Playing career: 2002–2007
- Position: Point guard
- Number: 7, 14

Career history
- 2002–2005: Lietuvos rytas
- 2004–2005: →Bnei HaSharon
- 2005–2006: JSF Nanterre
- 2006: Mersin BB
- 2006–2007: BC Kyiv

Career highlights
- LKL Slam Dunk Contest Champion (2003)

Aaron Lucas (born December 14, 1979) is an American former professional basketball player, who played for various clubs in Europe.

== High school ==
After getting an opportunity to play varsity late into his freshman year, Lucas went on to garner several All Region Team selections, All State selection, Beach Ball and Hooters Holiday Tournament MVP's, North/South All Star, McDonald's All American (game nominee) and Nike All American as well as 1998 South Carolina Player of the Year.

== College career ==
Lucas college basketball played for NCAA Division I's South Carolina's Gamecocks, along with future Lietuvos Rytas stars Marijonas Petravičius and Chuck Eidson. He averaged 10.4 ppg, 2.4 rpg and 3.9 apg during his senior year.

== Professional playing career ==
After graduating University of South Carolina, Lucas briefly played for Columbia Range, a basketball team in Columbia. Lucas left the club and came to Lietuvos Rytas, where he instantly became its leader. Having an impressive vertical jump and dunking ability, he won the 2003 LKL "Oro Karalius", a competition similar to the NBA Slam Dunk Contest. In 2004, he was loaned to Bnei HaSharon, but returned to his former team in spring of 2005. In May 2005, he terminated his contract and signed with JSF Nanterre. He last played for BC Kyiv in 2007.
