= Dilys (surname) =

- Lithuanian surname
- m.: Dilys
- f.: (unmarried): Dilytė
- f.: (married): Dilienė

Dilys is a Lithuanian surname. Notable people with the surname include:

- Antanas Dilys (1932–2021), Lithuanian photographer
- Gabija Dilytė, Lithuanian wrestler
- Mantas Dilys
- Povilas Dilys (1905–1995), Lithuanian Evangelical Reformed priest, general superintendent
- Vilmantas Dilys
