= Romanas Brazdauskis =

Lithuanian basketball player (born 1964)

Personal information
- Born: February 20, 1964 (age 62) Kretinga, Lithuanian SSR, Soviet Union
Medal record
Men's basketball
Representing Lithuania
Olympic Games
Bronze medal – third place	1992 Barcelona	Team competition

Romanas Brazdauskis (born February 20, 1964, in Kretinga) is a former basketball player from Lithuania, who won the bronze medal with the Lithuania national basketball team at the 1992 Summer Olympics in Barcelona, Spain. His son, Lukas Brazdauskis, played for BC Lietuvos Rytas.

== Career ==
- 1981–1982: (Soviet Union) Lietkabelis Panevėžys
- 1982–1983: (Soviet Union) Statyba Vilnius
- 1983–1985: (Soviet Union) Rīgas ASK
- 1985–1987: (Soviet Union) Statyba Vilnius
- 1987–1990: (Soviet Union) Žalgiris Kaunas
- 1991–1992: (Australia) Vytis Adelaide
- 1993–1994: (Lithuania) Žalgiris Kaunas
- 1996–1997: (Slovakia) BK Inter Bratislava
- 1997–1998: (Lithuania) Olimpas Plungė
- 2000–2001: (Lithuania) Atletas Kaunas
- 2009–2010: (Lithuania) Raseiniai
