= Arvydas Gronskis =

Lithuanian basketball coach (born 1974)

Žalgiris-2 Kaunas
- Position: Head coach
- League: National Basketball League

Personal information
- Born: 17 May 1974 (age 52) Vilnius, Lithuanian SSR, USSR
- Coaching career: 2001–present

Career history

Coaching
- 2001–2007: Sakalai Vilnius (assistant)
- 2007–2015: Lietuvos rytas Vilnius (assistant)
- 2015: Lietuvos rytas Vilnius
- 2015–2017: Perlas Vilnius
- 2017: Lietuvos rytas Vilnius (assistant)
- 2017–2019: Perlas Vilnius
- 2019-present: Žalgiris-2 Kaunas

Career highlights
- As coach: 2× BBL champion (2007, 2009); EuroCup champion (2009); LKF Cup champion (2009); 2× LKL champion (2009, 2010)

Arvydas Gronskis (born 17 May 1974) is a Lithuanian professional basketball coach, most notable for his successful long-term working in Lietuvos rytas Vilnius coaching staff. He is currently the head coach of Žalgiris-2 Kaunas.
