= BC Sakalai =

Lithuanian basketball club

- Founded: 1991
- Dissolved: 2013
- Arena: Ekinstos laisvalaikio centras (capacity: 1,000)
- Location: Vilnius, Lithuania
- Team colors: Yellow and green
- President: Linas Kvedaravičius (till dissolution)
- Championships: Lithuanian Basketball A League (1994); Baltic Basketball League Challenge Cup (2009)
Home	Away

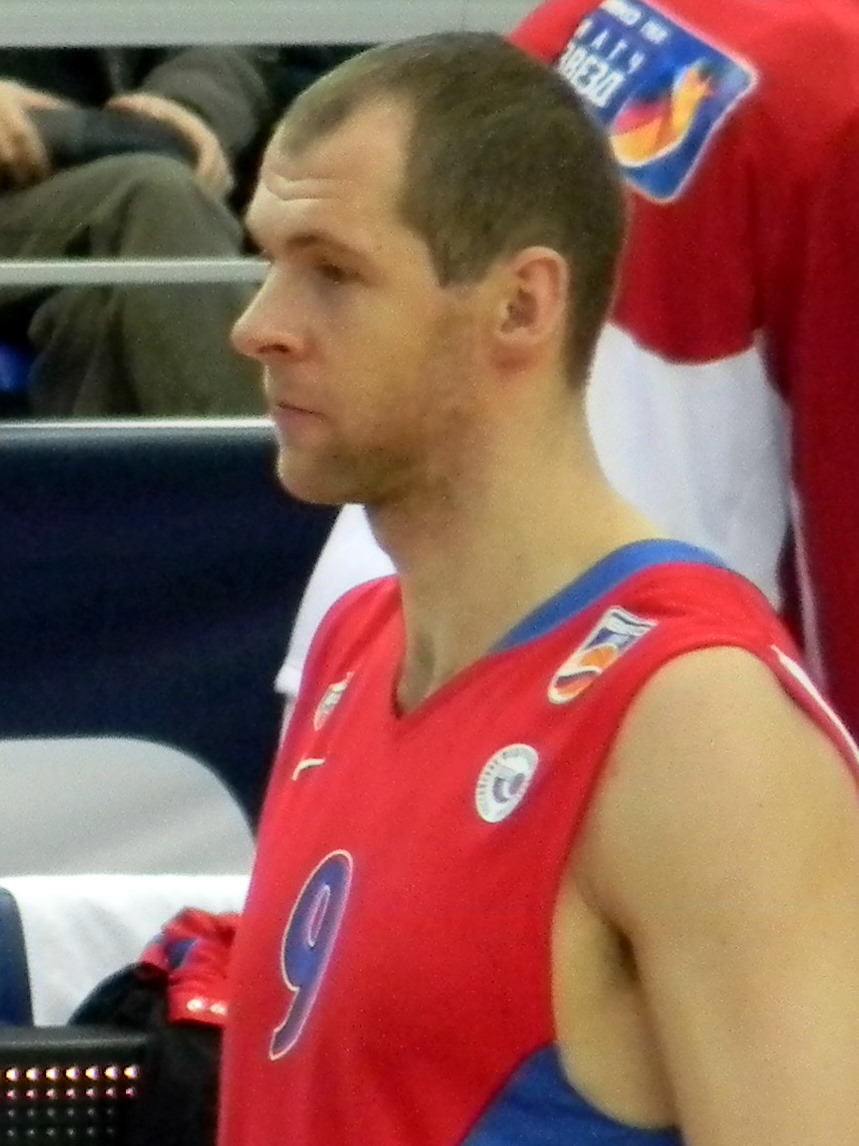
Ramūnas Šiškauskas, a Lithuanian basketball star player, started his career with Sakalai.

BC Sakalai was a professional basketball club based in Vilnius, Lithuania, playing in the Lithuanian Basketball League and the Baltic Basketball League. They played their home games at the 1,000-seat Ekinstos laisvalaikio centras.

Sakalai means falcons in the Lithuanian language.

== Franchise history ==
=== Beginning and LKAL champions (1991–1994) ===
BC Sakalai began playing in 1991 at the Lithuanian Basketball A League (LKAL). In 1994, Sakalai managed to win the LKAL Championship and in June 1994, the Lithuanian Basketball League (LKL) Committee accepted them into the LKL.

=== LKL debut (1994–1995) ===
In their debut season, Sakalai finished in eighth place (17 wins and 23 losses), and were coached by Šarūnas Sakalauskas. Their first win was against NECA Kaunas, 100–88. In the playoffs, Sakalai lost the series 0–2 in the first round to BC Žalgiris. Andrius Giedraitis lead the team in scoring. Sakalai also played in the FIBA Korać Cup, qualifying, but losing to Panionios Athens in the second round.

=== LKL and Korać Cup (1995–1999) ===
In the 1995–96 LKL season, Sakalai finished in fifth place, led by players like Giedraitis and Gintautas Šivickas, and lost to favorites Atletas Kaunas 2–0 in the playoffs. In the 1996–97 season, Giedraitis lead the LKL in scoring, though Sakalai were largely inconsistent, finishing in seventh place, losing to BC Olimpas in the playoffs, 2–1, though giving fight to the team that eventually reached the LKL finals. During the season, Ramūnas Šiškauskas made his pro debut in the LKL. Players like Erikas Kučiauskas, Rolandas Matulis and Arnas Kazlauskas, who played in the team since the first LKL season, also had their best seasons to date. Throughout this time, Sakalai also had a rivalry with the other Vilnius team, BC Statyba, with Sakalai winning most of their matches.

In the 1997–98 season, Sakalai had their best season to date. Under coach Sakalauskas, coaching the team since their LKL debut, Sakalai finished second in the LKL regular season standings. Giedraitis lead the team in scoring once again, and Šiškauskas showed a lot of improvement in his second LKL season. Sakalai also played in the Baltic Cup tournament. In the playoffs of the LKL, however, Sakalai lost to Atletas Kaunas 2–0 in the semifinals, preventing the team from reaching the LKL finals. In the bronze medal series, Sakalai lost to the new team in Vilnius, Statyba-Lietuvos rytas, in somewhat a shocker, 2–1. Sakalai finished in fourth place.

In the 1998–99 season, head coach Sakalauskas left the team during the season, becoming head coach for the rival BC Lietuvos rytas team. Giedraitis also left the team to sign with Lietuvos rytas, and during the season, Šiškauskas, who became the team leader in Sakalai, also left to sign with Lietuvos rytas. Assistant coach Rūtenis Paulauskas became the head coach of the team, at just 27 years old. Sakalai then signed Virginijus Sirvydis, Egidijus Mikalajūnas and Rolandas Skaisgirys, who were let go by Lietuvos rytas. Sirvydis, in particular, became the new team leader. Dainius Šalenga made his LKL debut during the season. In the LKL, Sakalai finished only in sixth place in the regular season, but eliminated the heavily favored BC Alita in the quarterfinals 2–1. In the semifinals, Sakalai gave fight, but lost to Lietuvos rytas 2–0 in the semifinals. In the bronze medal series, once again underdogs, shocked everyone again, by defeating BC Šiauliai 2–1, winning the final match away, and finishing in third place in the LKL. The win also helped Sakalai qualify for the Saporta Cup for the next season.

=== Saporta Cup, LKL and BBL (1999–2008) ===
The 1999–00 season was a very tumultuous one for Sakalai, who started the season by building a very powerful team for the Saporta Cup. By December, however, coach Paulauskas had resigned, and much of the team had also left, with point guards Jemeil Rich and Rolandas Jarutis, who signed with rivals Lietuvos rytas, being the most significant. Assistant coach and former player in the first LKL seasons Linas Šalkus became the new head coach. Sakalai recovered, thanks to solid play from Sirvydis, Matulis, Šalenga and Skaisgirys. Sakalai managed to qualify for the Saporta Cup playoffs, giving fight, but succumbing to KK Split in the playoffs. In the LKL, Sakalai once again reached the semifinals, again losing to Lietuvos rytas, 3–0. Sakalai once again faced BC Šiauliai in the bronze medal series, holding homecourt advantage this season, but this time, Šiauliai won the series 3–1, with Sakalai finishing in fourth place. Sakalai still qualified for the Saporta Cup the next season. Saulius Kuzminskas made his LKL debut during the season.

During the 2000–01 LKL season, coached by Šalkus again, Sakalai remained stable throughout the season. Šalenga, playing his best year, left during the season to sign with Žalgiris Kaunas. Simas Jasaitis made his LKL debut for the team. Sakalai were eliminated from the Saporta Cup after the regular season. In the LKL, Skaisgirys and Matulis led the team. Sakalai once again faced Šiauliai in the playoffs, this time in the quarterfinals, losing the series 2–0 and finishing in fifth place for the season. Throughout the next 2 seasons, in 2001–02 and 2002–03, Sakalai were once again competitive, finishing in sixth and fifth places respectively. Mindaugas Lukauskis, who played in the team during the 2001–02 season, had his best year and breakout season with Sakalai.

In 2003–04 and 2004–05 LKL seasons, Sakalai were one away from third place, but lost to Šiauliai both times. Also, in 2005, Sakalai competed in the first Baltic Basketball League season, finishing in sixth place. During this time, Sakalai had formed a core with longtime team players like Matulis, Skaisgirys and Kučiauskas, also players like Eligijus Redeckas, also signing talented young players like Renaldas Seibutis and Steponas Babrauskas, who became leaders of the team. Martynas Gecevičius made his LKL debut during the 2004–05 season.

Over the next few seasons, however, results started to decline. During the 2005–06 season, Sakalai still had a solid season in the LKL, finishing in fifth place and in the BBL, where they finished in eighth place, just narrowly missing qualification for the Final Six tournament. During the season, Skaisgirys left the team, though the team core still remained. During the 2006–07 season, Sakalai signed talented young players like Mindaugas Kuzminskas, Vytautas Šarakauskas, Simas Buterlevičius, Aidas Viskontas and Justas Sinica. Redeckas had retired, while Matulis and Kučiauskas remained with the team. This time, Sakalai struggled, playing an unsuccessful season in both the BBL and LKL. Coach Šalkus resigned and was replaced by Rimas Kurtinaitis, while team leader Gecevičius signed with Lietuvos rytas. Results largely remained the same, with Sakalai finishing in seventh place in the LKL and failing to qualify for the playoffs in the BBL. During the 2007–08 season, Kurtinatis left the team early to take a coaching job in Poland, leaving assistant coach Romualdas Petronis to take over the team. Led by Justas Sinica, Sakalai played better than expected, finishing in seventh place in both the LKL, and BBL Challenge Cup.

=== BBL Challenge Cup winners (2008–2009) ===
The 2008–09 season looked to become the turning point for Sakalai. Under new coach Nerijus Zabarauskas, Sakalai won the BBL Challenge Cup, defeating VEF Rīga 84–77 in the finals, and making a comeback to the BBL Elite division - where they fought, but lost, to Nevėžis Kėdainiai. Sakalai were led by their young core, consisting of Arvydas Šikšnius, who was the Challenge Cup MVP, Šarakauskas, Vilmantas Dilys, Laurynas Samėnas and Arnas Labuckas. Rolandas Matulis still played with the team, while Kučiauskas retired after the 2007–08 season and became the club director for Sakalai. In the LKL, Sakalai finished in seventh place, and qualified for the LKL playoffs, losing to Lietuvos rytas in the quarterfinals. Though a very successful season for Sakalai, this season did not become a comeback for the team.

=== Decline (2009–2013) ===
Over the next few seasons, the team completely plummeted. Club director and longtime player Kučiauskas became the head coach for the team. During the summer, much of the young core left the team, with only Samėnas remaining. Skaisgirys and Sirvydis returned to the team, with Sirvydis still showing great form and becoming team leader. In the BBL Challenge Cup, Sakalai played disappointingly, not even coming close to reaching their previous season heights. In the LKL, for the first time in club history, Sakalai didn't even qualify for the LKL playoffs. During this time, Sakalai also lost much of their popularity in Vilnius, with Lietuvos rytas and BC Perlas becoming the most popular teams in Vilnius. The ninth-place finish was the worst for Sakalai at the time.

In the 2010–11 season, Kučiauskas remained as head coach, while Andrius Giedraitis returned to the team as an assistant coach. During the season, Arnas Butkevičius made his pro debut, while more young players for the team like Augustas Pečiukevičius and Ovidijus Varanauskas played a lot more solidly. Sirvydis and Matulis still lead the team. After a disappointing start, Rūtenis Paulauskas briefly returned to the team, taking over as head coach. Sakalai finished the season in 11th place in the LKL, and once again failed to qualify for the BBL Challenge Cup playoffs.

Before the 2011–12 season, Sakalai signed Kazys Maksvytis as the new head coach for the team. Maksvytis had coached the Lithuanian U16, U18 and U19 teams, winning gold medals in both the European and World championships. Sakalai also signed Deividas Pukis, who was one of the team leaders. Maksvytis gave more playing time for the young players of the team, such as Butkevičius, Samėnas, Evaldas Baniulis and Pukis, while also playing veterans Sirvydis and Matulis. While in the LKL, Sakalai did not have much success, finishing in 10th place, they did have success in the BBL Challenge Cup, where they reached the playoffs and won third place.

The 2012–13 season turned out to be the last one for Sakalai. Over the last few seasons, Sakalai had many financial issues. During the summer, Maksvytis left the team, and former coach Romualdas Petronis returned to become the head coach for the team, while Sirvydis, who retired in the summer, became the assistant head coach. Rolandas Matulis remained for the team, for the 19th season, with only playing one season away, in 2001–02, with Žalgiris. During the season, players like Justas Sinica briefly returned to the team, but left just as quick due to the financial situation. Edvinas Šeškus and Paulius Dambrauskas, on loan from Lietuvos rytas, suffered season ending injuries, while much of the talented young players, like Pukis and Butkevičius, left during the summer. Sakalai played disappointingly in both the BBL, and the LKL. After conflicts with management, coach Petronis resigned, and Sirvydis finished the season as head coach. In the LKL, Sakalai finished in 10th place. Due to the financial issues, Sakalai were suspended by the LKL for the 2013–14 season, and were dissolved in the summer of 2014.

== Season by season ==
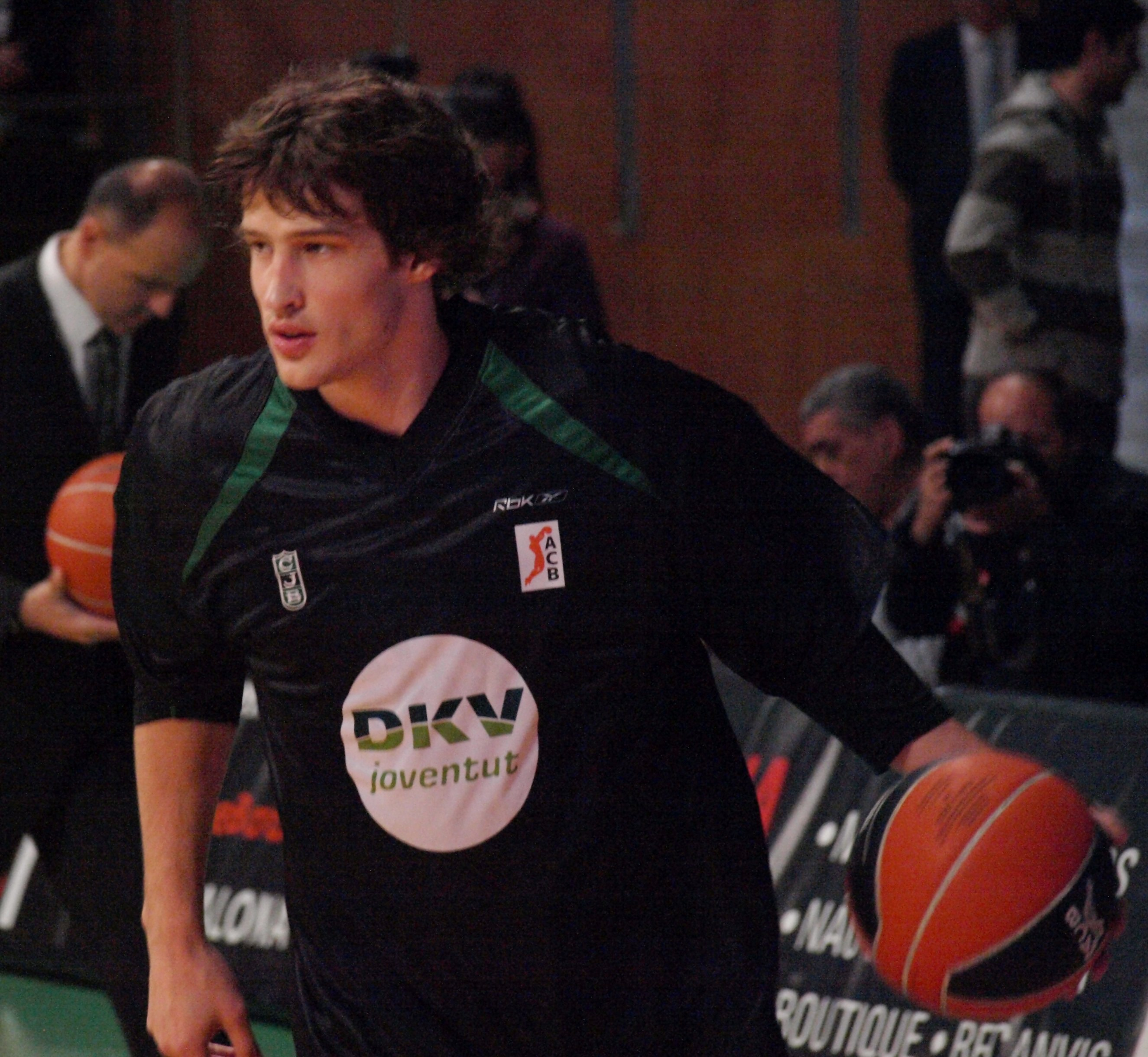
Simas Jasaitis was one of the BC Sakalai team leaders in 2000–01 season.

Season	League	Pos.	Playoffs	Baltic League	Pos.	LKF Cup	European competitions
1993–94	LKAL	1	Promoted	–	—	—	—
1994–95	LKL	8	Quarterfinals	—	—	—	Korać Cup; First round
1995–96	LKL	5	Semifinals	—	—	—	—
1996–97	LKL	7	Quarterfinals	—	—	—	—
1997–98	LKL	2	4th place	—	—	—	—
1998–99	LKL	6	Bronze medal	—	—	—	—
1999–2000	LKL	3	4th place	—	—	—	Saporta Cup; Round of 32
2000–01	LKL	4	Quarterfinals	—	—	—	Saporta Cup; Group stage
2001–02	LKL	6	Quarterfinals	—	—	—	—
2002–03	LKL	5	Quarterfinals	—	—	—	—
2003–04	LKL	4	4th place	—	—	—	—
2004–05	LKL	3	4th place	Elite Division	6	—	—
2005–06	LKL	5	Quarterfinals	Elite Division	8	—	—
2006–07	LKL	7	Quarterfinals	Elite Division	13	—	—
2007–08	LKL	7	Quarterfinals	Elite Division	17	—	—
2008–09	LKL	7	Quarterfinals	Challenge Cup	1	Eighth-finals	—
2009–10	LKL	9	—	Challenge Cup	3	Second round	—
2010–11	LKL	11	—	Challenge Cup	7	Quarterfinals	—
2011–12	LKL	10	—	Challenge Cup	3	First round	—
2012–13	LKL	10	—	Elite Division	12	—	—

== Notable players ==
- (Lithuania) Andrius Giedraitis 1994–1999
- (Lithuania) Ramūnas Šiškauskas 1996–1998
- (Lithuania) Dainius Šalenga 1998–2000
- (Lithuania) Saulius Kuzminskas 1999–2000
- (Lithuania) Alvydas Pazdrazdis 1999–2000
- (Lithuania) Simas Jasaitis 2000–2001
- (Lithuania) Mindaugas Lukauskis 2001–2002
- (Lithuania) Marius Prekevičius 2001–2002
- (Lithuania) Renaldas Seibutis 2003–2005
- (Lithuania) Martynas Gecevičius 2004–2007
- (Lithuania) Mindaugas Kuzminskas 2006–2007

== Championships ==
- Lithuanian Basketball A League champions: 1994
- Baltic Basketball League Challenge Cup champions: 2009
