= Paulius Dambrauskas =

Lithuanian basketball player

Personal information
- Born: December 16, 1991 (age 34) Vilnius, Lithuania
- Listed height: 1.95 m (6 ft 5 in)
- Listed weight: 83 kg (183 lb)

Career information
- Playing career: 2008–2022
- Position: Point guard

Career history
- 2008–2009: Vilniaus „KM-Magnus Orem“
- 2009–2016: Lietuvos rytas Vilnius
- 2009–2011: → Vilnius Perlas
- 2012–2013: → Vilnius Sakalai
- 2013–2015: → Alytaus Dzūkija
- 2015–2016: → Šiauliai
- 2016–2017: Maurienne Savoie Basket
- 2017–2018: MKS Dąbrowa Górnicza
- 2018–2019: Klaipėdos Neptūnas
- 2019–2020: Stal Ostrów Wielkopolski
- 2020–2021: Astoria Bydgoszcz
- 2021: Antibes Sharks
- 2021-2022: Stella Azzurra Roma

Paulius Dambrauskas (born 16 December 1991) is a Lithuanian former basketball player.

== Professional career ==
In 2010, Dambrauskas signed a long-term contract with BC Lietuvos Rytas. In the 2012–13 season BC Sakalai loaned Dambrauskas from Lietuvos Rytas. In February he suffered a shoulder injury and was not able to play for 4 months.

After recovering from the injury he started the 2013–14 season with Lietuvos Rytas, but later that year was loaned to BC Dzūkija. In the 2013–14 season he also started in Lietuvos Rytas, but once again later that year was loaned to BC Dzūkija. From 2015 August he played for BC Šiauliai. In 2016-17 Dambrauskas played in Maurienne Savoie Basket, and for the first time in his career outside Lithuania.

On June 28, 2019, he signed with Stal Ostrów Wielkopolski of the Polish Basketball League. Dambrauskas averaged 12.8 points, 4.5 rebounds and 2.5 assists per game.

On September 14, 2020, he has signed with Astoria Bydgoszcz of the Polish Basketball League.
