= Ernestas Ežerskis =

Lithuanian basketball player (born 1987)

Personal information
- Born: May 5, 1987 (age 39) Panevėžys, Lithuanian SSR, Soviet Union
- Listed height: 6 ft 4 in (1.93 m)
- Listed weight: 190 lb (86 kg)

Career information
- Playing career: 2004–2021
- Position: Point guard
- Number: 11

Career history
- 2004–2006: Panevėžys
- 2006–2007: Lietuvos Rytas
- 2006–2007: →Neptūnas
- 2007: →KR Basket
- 2007–2009: Aisčiai
- 2009–2012: Techasas
- 2012: Liepāja Triobet
- 2012: Nevėžis Kėdainiai
- 2012–2013: Jämtland Basket
- 2013: Prienai
- 2013: Juventus
- 2013–2014: Lietkabelis
- 2014–2015: TYCO Rapla
- 2015–2016: Nevėžis Kėdainiai
- 2016–2018: Sūduva-Mantinga
- 2018-2019: Lietkabelis Panevėžys
- 2018-2019: →BC Ežerūnas
- 2019: Sūduva-Mantinga
- 2019-2021: Panevėžio Bangenė-Aivera

Career highlights
- LKL All-Star (2010)

Ernestas Ežerskis (born 5 May 1987 in Panevėžys, Lithuanian SSR) is a Lithuanian former professional basketball player. He plays the point guard position.

== Career ==
In September 2007, Ežerskis joined KR of the Icelandic Úrvalsdeild karla on loan from Lietuvos Rytas. His first game with KR was against Snæfell in the Icelandic Company Cup finals where he scored 3 points. In his next game, during Icelandic Super Cup where he went scoreless in 9 minutes of playing time. His best game, and ultimately his last game for KR, came against Fjölnir in the Úrvalsdeild karla where he scored 15 points in 19 minutes. After the game he left KR and returned to Rytas.
