= Artūras Jomantas =

Lithuanian basketball player

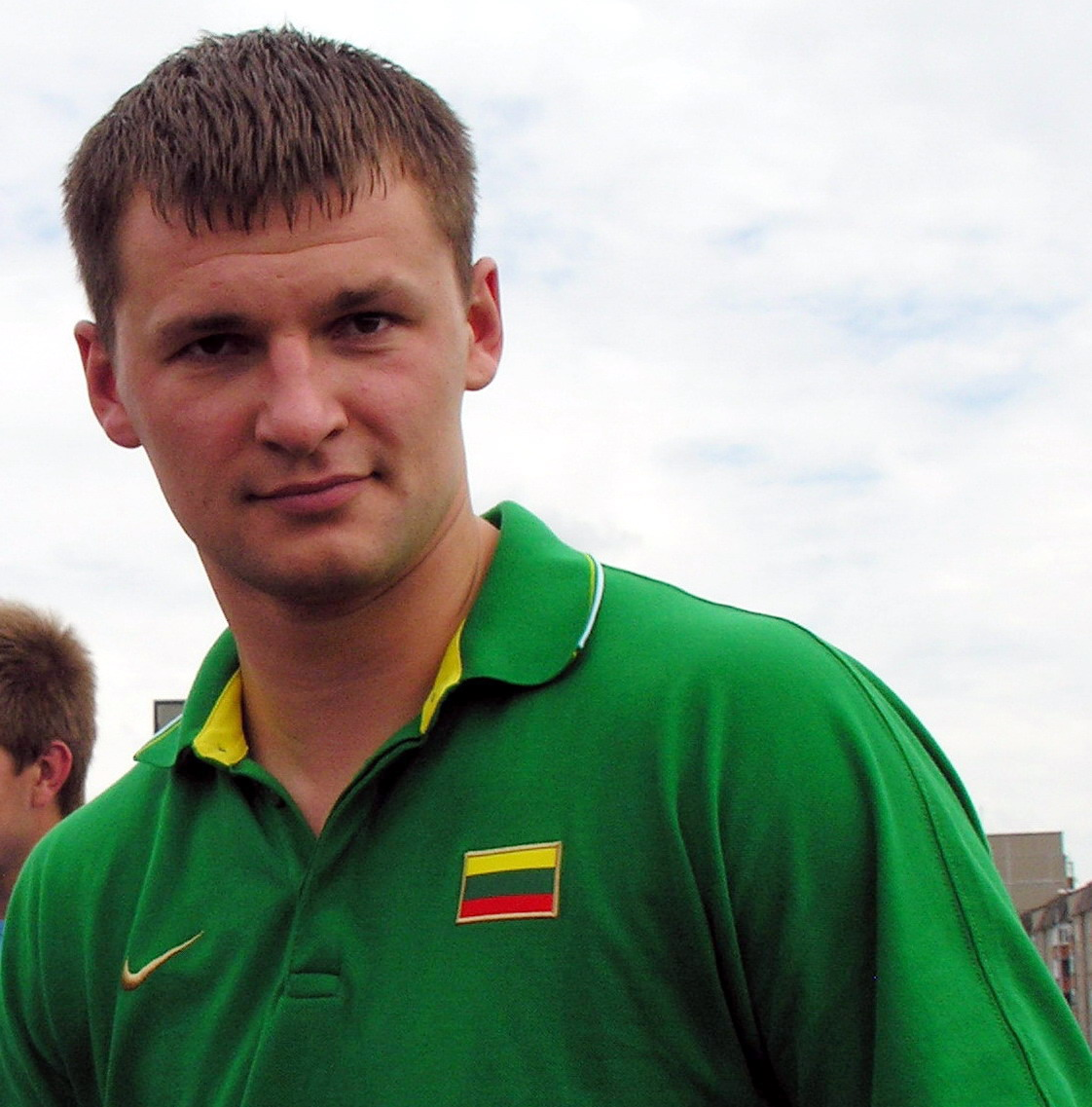
- Jomantas in 2009

Personal information
- Born: May 4, 1985 (age 41) Mažeikiai, Lithuanian SSR, Soviet Union
- Listed height: 6 ft 6.75 in (2.00 m)
- Listed weight: 234 lb (106 kg)

Career information
- Playing career: 2001–2023
- Position: Power forward

Career history
- 2001–2004: Mažeikiai Nafta
- 2004–2006: Šiauliai
- 2006–2013: Lietuvos rytas
- 2013–2014: Pieno žvaigždės
- 2014–2015: Dzūkija
- 2015–2016: Šiauliai
- 2016–2018: Lietuvos rytas
- 2018–2022: Dzūkija
- 2022–2023: M Basket

Career highlights
- FIBA EuroCup All-Star (2006); 2× LKL champion (2009, 2010); EuroCup champion (2009); LKL Defensive Player of the Year (2016)
Medals
Men's basketball
Representing Lithuania
FIBA Under-21 World Championship
Gold medal – first place	2005 Argentina	National Team
FIBA Europe Under-20 Championship
Silver medal – second place	2005 Russia	National Team
FIBA European U-20 Championship
Bronze medal – third place	2004 Czech Republic	National Team
FIBA Under-19 World Championship
Silver medal – second place	2003 Greece	National Team

Artūras Jomantas (born May 4, 1985) is a Lithuanian former professional basketball player.

== Professional career ==
Born in Mažeikiai, Lithuania, he made his debut with Mažeikiai Nafta during the 2001–02 season. He played high-school basketball at Laurinburg Normal HS. In 2004, he signed with Šiauliai and played there until the end of the 2005–06 season. He joined Lietuvos rytas in 2006 and stayed there for 7 seasons. Despite being a solid player at first, his career in Lietuvos rytas quickly went downward, and he was eventually released in May 2013. In August 2013, it was announced that Jomantas signed with Pieno žvaigždės. He later played a season for Dzūkija and Šiauliai, and came back to Lietuvos rytas in 2016. In 2018, he returned to Dzūkija and played 4 seasons there until signing with his hometown team, Mažeikiai, in the summer of 2022, where he played until 2023.

== Career statistics ==
Legend
GP	Games played	GS	Games started	MPG	Minutes per game
FG%	Field-goal percentage	3P%	3-point field-goal percentage	FT%	Free-throw percentage
RPG	Rebounds per game	APG	Assists per game	SPG	Steals per game
BPG	Blocks per game	PPG	Points per game	PIR	Performance index rating
**Bold**	Career high

=== EuroLeague ===
Year	Team	GP	GS	MPG	FG%	3P%	FT%	RPG	APG	SPG	BPG	PPG	PIR
2007–08	Lietuvos Rytas	**20**	7	23.0	.529	**.429**	.717	4.1	1.7	1.1	**.2**	6.3	8.3
2009–10	Lietuvos Rytas	10	**10**	**32.1**	**.571**	.294	.727	**4.7**	**2.8**	**1.5**	.1	**9.5**	**11.5**
2010–11	Lietuvos Rytas	12	5	16.4	.412	.214	.750	2.2	1.0	.4	.1	2.4	2.5
2012–13	Lietuvos Rytas	3	3	25.0	.250	.286	**1.000**	4.0	1.0	.7	.0	4.0	6.3

== Awards and achievements ==
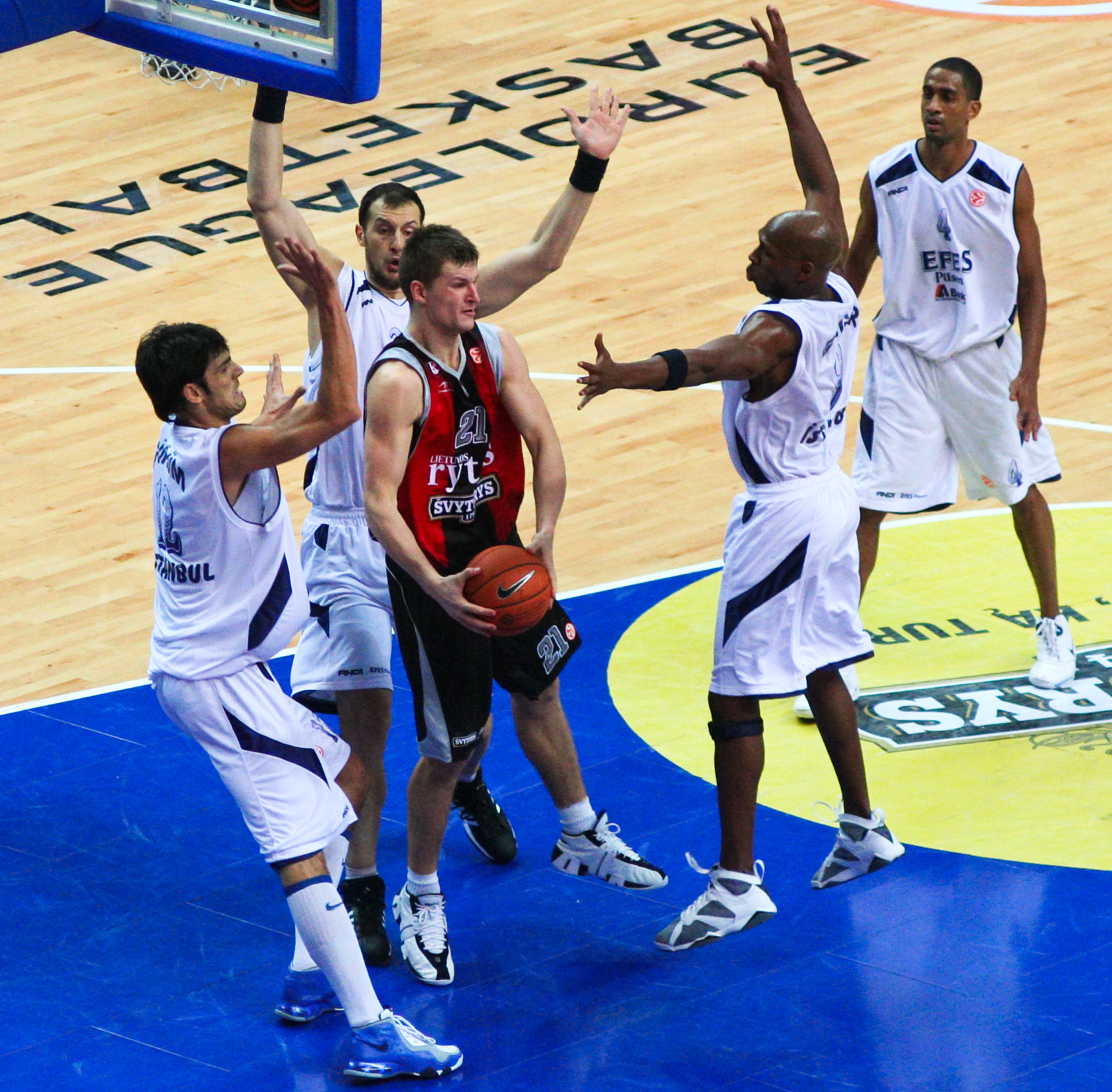
Jomantas during his first tenure with Lietuvos rytas Vilnius in 2007.

- LKL, Baltic Basketball League, LKF Vice-Champion - 2008
- He was named the 2007-08 Euroleague Week-2 MVP.
- He won the 2007 Baltic League with BC Lietuvos rytas.
- He played in the 2005 Lithuanian All Star Game.
- He played in the 2006 FIBA EuroCup All Star Game.
- He played in 2007 Baltic League All Star Game.
- He has been member of the Lithuanian U-16, U-18, U-20 and U-21 National Team.
- He played at the 2001 European U-16 Championship.
- He won the silver medal at the 2003 World U-18 Championship.
- He won the silver medal at the 2005 European U-20 Championship.
- He won the bronze medal at the 2005 European U-20 Championship.
- He won the gold medal at the 2005 World Under-21 Championship.
- LKF cup winner: 2009
- LKL second-place winner: 2007, 2008
- ULEB Eurocup champion 2009
- Euroleague MVP of the Week - Season 2007–08, Week 2, against Maccabi Tel Aviv B.C.
