= Alfredas Vainauskas =

Lithuanian basketball player and coach

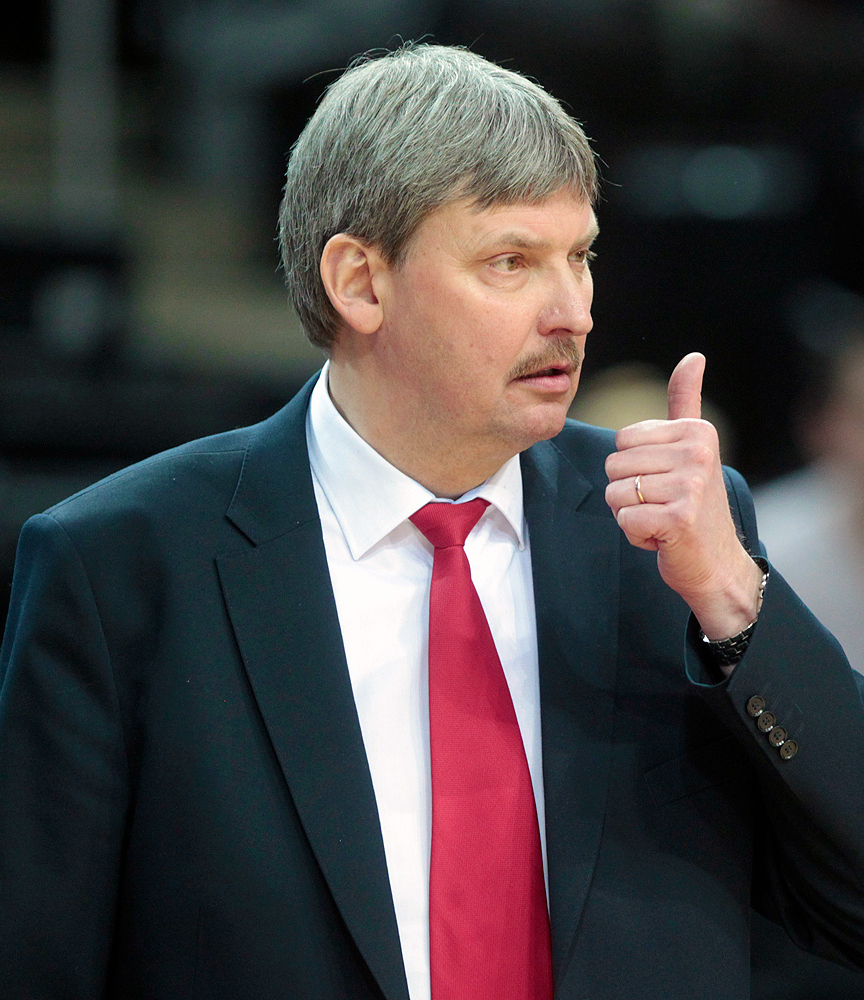
Alfredas Vainauskas in 2015

Alfredas Vainauskas, born 16 January 1961 in Vilnius, Lithuanian SSR), is a Lithuanian basketball coach, currently coaching Utena women's basketball team.

== Playing career ==
In 1978, Vainauskas started his career with BC Statyba. With this team, he won a bronze medal in the USSR League in 1979. In 1989, Vainauskas, along with his teammate Šarūnas Marčiulionis, left the team and played abroad, in Slovakia ("BC Prievidza") for two seasons, in Hungary ("BC Debreceni") for one season and in Czech Republic ("BC Kunin") for two seasons. In 1994, he returned to Statyba, and, after the season, concluded his basketball playing career.

== Coaching career ==
In 1995, Vainauskas became the assistant coach of Statyba. After the team dissolved in 1997, he continued coaching their successors, BC Lietuvos rytas until 2002. During his tenure with the team, he became the LKL champion twice, the now–defunct NEBL champion once, and the LKF Cup champion once. During the 2001–02 season, he teamed up with his former Statyba teammate Jonas Kazlauskas and assisted the team to a NEBL and a LKL championship victory.

In 2004, he switched to coaching women's basketball teams. He coached BC Lietuvos Telekomas for three seasons. He served as the assistant coach for Lithuania women's national team participating in EuroBasket 2007. During 2008–09 season, he was the assistant coach of WBC Dynamo Kursk and became the team's head coach in 2011. He led the team to its first EuroCup championship title in 2012, and, as a result, was named by FIBA coach of the year in European women's basketball. He coached the team for one and half more seasons, losing his position in November 2013.

== Russia women's national team ==
On 24 December 2012, he was named the head coach of the Russian national team. The team, named as one of the favorites in the EuroBasket 2013, suffered a shocking fate, and was eliminated in the group stage. Not only was this the worst EuroBasket appearance for the team, but it also lost its usual spot at the 2014 World Championship. On 21 October 2013, under heavy criticism from the Russian Basketball Federation, Vainauskas resigned from the post.
