= Martynas Purlys =

Lithuanian basketball player and executive

London Lions
- Position: General manager
- League: BBL; EuroCup

Personal information
- Born: 18 July 1971 (age 55) Vilnius, Lithuanian SSR, Soviet Union
- Listed height: 1.93 m (6 ft 4 in)
- Listed weight: 85 kg (187 lb)

Career information
- Playing career: 1990–2003

Career history
- 1990–1993: BC Rožňava
- 1993–1995: Statyba Vilnius
- 1995–1996: Neptūnas Klaipėda
- 1996–1999: Statyba Vilnius / Statyba-Lietuvos rytas / Lietuvos rytas
- 1999–2000: Sema Panevėžys
- 2000–2001: Legia Krolewskie
- 2001–2002: Shandong Flaming Bulls
- 2002–2003: TTÜ/A. Le Coq Tallinn
Medals
Men's basketball
Representing Soviet Union
FIBA Europe Under-16 Championship
Bronze medal – third place	1987 Yugoslavia	Team competition

Martynas Purlys (born 18 July 1971 in Vilnius) is a Lithuanian professional basketball executive and former player. He played the point guard and shooting guard positions. He is currently the general manager for London Lions of the British Basketball League (BBL). From 2010 to 2017, he was the team manager of the Lithuanian powerhouse Lietuvos rytas Vilnius. Since 2008, he was the head of Sports Development Group (SDG), an agency founded by Šarūnas Marčiulionis.
