= Evaldas Kandratavičius =

Lithuanian athletic trainer

BC Khimki
- Position: Athletic trainer
- League: VTB United League; EuroLeague

Personal information
- Born: Alytus, Lithuania

Career information
- College: Lithuanian Sports University; Lithuanian University of Health Sciences

Evaldas Kandratavičius is a Lithuanian professional athletic trainer, who has worked with some of the best professional basketball teams in Europe for multiple years, including: Lithuania men's national basketball team (debuted during the historic performance in 2010 FIBA World Championship), Lithuania women's national basketball team, CSKA Moscow (over 2 seasons), Lietuvos rytas Vilnius and many famous Women's National Basketball Association players. He graduated Lithuanian Sports University and successfully defended his dissertation in Lithuanian University of Health Sciences. He signed with BC Khimki in the summer of 2019.
