= Andrius Giedraitis =

Lithuanian basketball player and coach

Personal information
- Born: July 23, 1973 (age 53) Kapsukas, Lithuanian SSR, Soviet Union
- Listed height: 6 ft 5 in (1.96 m)
- Listed weight: 210 lb (95 kg)

Career information
- Playing career: 1992–2009
- Position: Shooting guard

Career history
- 1992–1994: LPA Vilnius
- 1994–1997: BC Sakalai
- 1997: BC Šiauliai
- 1997–1999: BC Sakalai
- 1999–2001: BC Lietuvos Rytas
- 2001–2002: Telindus Oostende
- 2002–2003: Śląsk Wrocław
- 2003–2004: BC Lietuvos Rytas
- 2004–2005: BSG Basket Ludwigsburg
- 2005–2007: BC Dynamo Moscow Region
- 2007–2008: Grupo Capitol Valladolid
- 2008: Śląsk Wrocław
- 2008–2009: Rūdupis Prienai

Career highlights
- Belgian League champion (2002); Lithuanian League champion (1999); Lithuanian League MVP (1997, 1998); Lithuanian League Second Division champion (1994)
Medals
Men's basketball
Representing Lithuania
Summer Olympics
Bronze medal – third place	2000 Sydney

Andrius Giedraitis (born July 23, 1973) is a Lithuanian former professional basketball player and coach.

== Professional career ==
Giedraitis started his career in the LPA Vilnius team, and he later moved to BC Sakalai. In 1998, he became a member of BC Lietuvos Rytas. He was one of the leaders of that team. In 2001, he moved to Telindus Oostende. During the 2002–03 season, he played with Śląsk Wrocław, where he became one of the team's leaders (averaging 11.6 points per game).

In 2003, he signed a contract with BC Lietuvos Rytas, however, due to an injury, he did not play. In 2004, he moved to BSG Basket Ludwigsburg, where he also immediately became one of the team's leaders. In 2005, he played with BC Dynamo Moscow Region. In 2007, he moved to Grupo Capitol Valladolid.

== Coaching career ==
On August 12, 2010, Giedraitis became an assistant coach for Sakalai.

== Career statistics ==
Legend
GP	Games played	GS	Games started	MPG	Minutes per game
FG%	Field-goal percentage	3P%	3-point field-goal percentage	FT%	Free-throw percentage
RPG	Rebounds per game	APG	Assists per game	SPG	Steals per game
BPG	Blocks per game	PPG	Points per game	PIR	Performance index rating
**Bold**	Career high

=== EuroLeague ===
Year	Team	GP	GS	MPG	FG%	3P%	FT%	RPG	APG	SPG	BPG	PPG	PIR
2001–02	Telindus Oostende	14	13	27.2	.521	.529	.884	3.5	1.6	1.1	.2	13.6	16.0
2002–03	Śląsk Wrocław	14	8	25.2	.618	.552	.825	2.4	1.8	.9	.0	13.1	14.3
