= Šarūnas Sakalauskas =

Lithuanian basketball coach (born 1960)

Personal information
- Born: September 24, 1960 (age 66) Kaunas, Lithuania

Career history

Coaching
- 1994–1998: Sakalai
- 1999–2001: Lietuvos rytas
- 2001–2009: Eisbären Bremerhaven

Career highlights
- Lithuanian League champion (2000); German ProA champion (2005); BBL Coach of the Year (2006)

Šarūnas Sakalauskas (September 24, 1960 in Kaunas) is a former Lithuanian basketball coach. He was the coach of Sakalai, Lietuvos rytas Vilnius and Eisbären Bremerhaven. During the 2005–06 season he was named Coach of the Year in the German Basketball Bundesliga. In 2010, Sakalauskas was the sports director of Žalgiris Kaunas.

== Achievements ==
- Lithuanian Basketball League champion – 2000
- Germany Division II league champion – 2005
- German League Coach of the Year – 2006
