= Vilmantas Dilys =

Lithuanian basketball player

Personal information
- Born: October 6, 1987 (age 39) Utena, Lithuanian SSR, Soviet Union
- Listed height: 2.08 m (6 ft 10 in)
- Listed weight: 104 kg (229 lb)

Career information
- Playing career: 2003–Present
- Position: Power forward / small forward

Career history
- 2003–2008: Žalgiris Kaunas
- 2003–2004, 2008: →Žalgiris-Arvydas Sabonis school
- 2006–2007: →Clinicas Rincón Axarquía
- 2008–2009: Sakalai Vilnius
- 2009–2010: Arkadia Traiskirchen Lions
- 2010–2011: BC Palanga
- 2011: Perlas Vilnius
- 2011–2013: Lietuvos rytas Vilnius
- 2013: Nevėžis Kėdainiai
- 2013–2014: Tartu Ülikool/Rock
- 2014–2015: Dzūkija Alytus
- 2015: Bàsquet Manresa
- 2015–2016: Vytautas Prienai-Birštonas
- 2016–2017: Pieno žvaigždės Pasvalys
- 2022-Present: Bristol Hurricanes

Vilmantas Dilys (born October 6, 1987) is a Lithuanian professional basketball player. He is 2.08 m tall and can play both power forward and small forward positions.
