= BC Ežerūnas =

Ežerūnas-Atletas
- Leagues: Regional League
- Founded: 2009
- Dissolved: 2024
- History: „Ežerūnas-Karys“ (2009-2013) „Tiumenas-Ežerūnas“ (2013-2014) „Ežerūnas-Karys“ (2014-2016) „Ežerūnas“ (2016-2020) „Ežerūnas-Atletas“ (2020-2024)
- Arena: Molėtų krepšinio arena, Molėtai
- Capacity: 500
- Location: Molėtai, Lithuania
- Team colors: White, Blue
- President: (Lithuania) Kipras Baleišis
- Head coach: (Lithuania) Marius Pociukonis
- Affiliations: Juventus Utena; Olimpas Ukmergė
Home	Away

BC Ežerūnas-Atletas was a Lithuanian professional basketball club based in Molėtai, Lithuania. Founded in 2009, the club from 2011 to 2021 competed in National Basketball League, since 2021 to 2024 competed in Regional Basketball League.

In August 2024, the club ceased all operations.

== Club achievements ==
- 2011-2012 season: NKL 13th place
- 2012-2013 season: NKL 15th place
- 2013-2014 season: NKL 3rd place
- 2014-2015 season: NKL 2nd place
- 2015-2016 season: NKL 13th place
- 2016-2017 season: NKL 13th place
- 2017-2018 season: NKL 7th place
- 2018-2019 season: NKL 11th place

== Notable players and coaches ==
- (Lithuania) Gintautas Matulis
- (Lithuania) Saulius Kuzminskas
- (Lithuania) Andrius Šležas
- (Lithuania) Kęstutis Šeštokas
- (Lithuania) Evaldas Baniulis
- (Lithuania) Žygimantas Šeštokas
- (United States) Thomas Ray Davis
- (Lithuania) Karolis Lukošiūnas
- (Lithuania) Dovydas Giedraitis
- (Lithuania) Arnas Beručka
