= Kęstutis Marčiulionis =

Lithuanian basketball player (born 1977)

Personal information
- Born: March 24, 1976 (age 50) Kaunas, Lithuanian SSR, Soviet Union
Medals
Men's basketball
Representing Lithuania
Olympic Men's basketball
Bronze medal – third place	2000 Sydney	Lithuania
FIBA Europe Under-18 Championship
Gold medal – first place	1994 Israel	U-18 Team

Kęstutis Marčiulionis (born April 4, 1977) is a Lithuanian basketball player. He is a 6-foot-2-inch (1.88 m) point guard.

Kęstutis Marčiulionis played NCAA collegiate basketball at the University of Delaware in the United States. He has represented his home country in several international competitions, most notably the 2000 Summer Olympics, where he won a bronze medal.

Marčiulionis also played high school basketball for Huguenot Academy, a small private school located in Powhatan County, Virginia, during its 1994–1995 season.

== Professional clubs ==
- 1993–1994: BC Žalgiris
- 1994–1995: Huguenot Academy
- 1995–1996: Hargrave Military Academy
- 1996–2000: University of Delaware
- 2000–2001: BC Žalgiris
- 2001–2002: BC Lietuvos Rytas
- 2002–2003: Idea Śląsk Wrocław
- 2003: BC Bremerhaven
- 2003: BC Atletas
- 2004: Astoria Bydgoszcz
- 2004–2005: Anwil Wloclawek
- 2005–2006: BC Kaposvár
- 2006–2007: BC Albacomp
- 2007–2008: CB Mallorquí
- 2008–2009: BC Kaposvár
- 2009-2010: BC Kecskemét
- 2011-2012: Volukte Kaunas
