= Andrius Šležas =

Lithuanian basketball player and coach (born 1975)

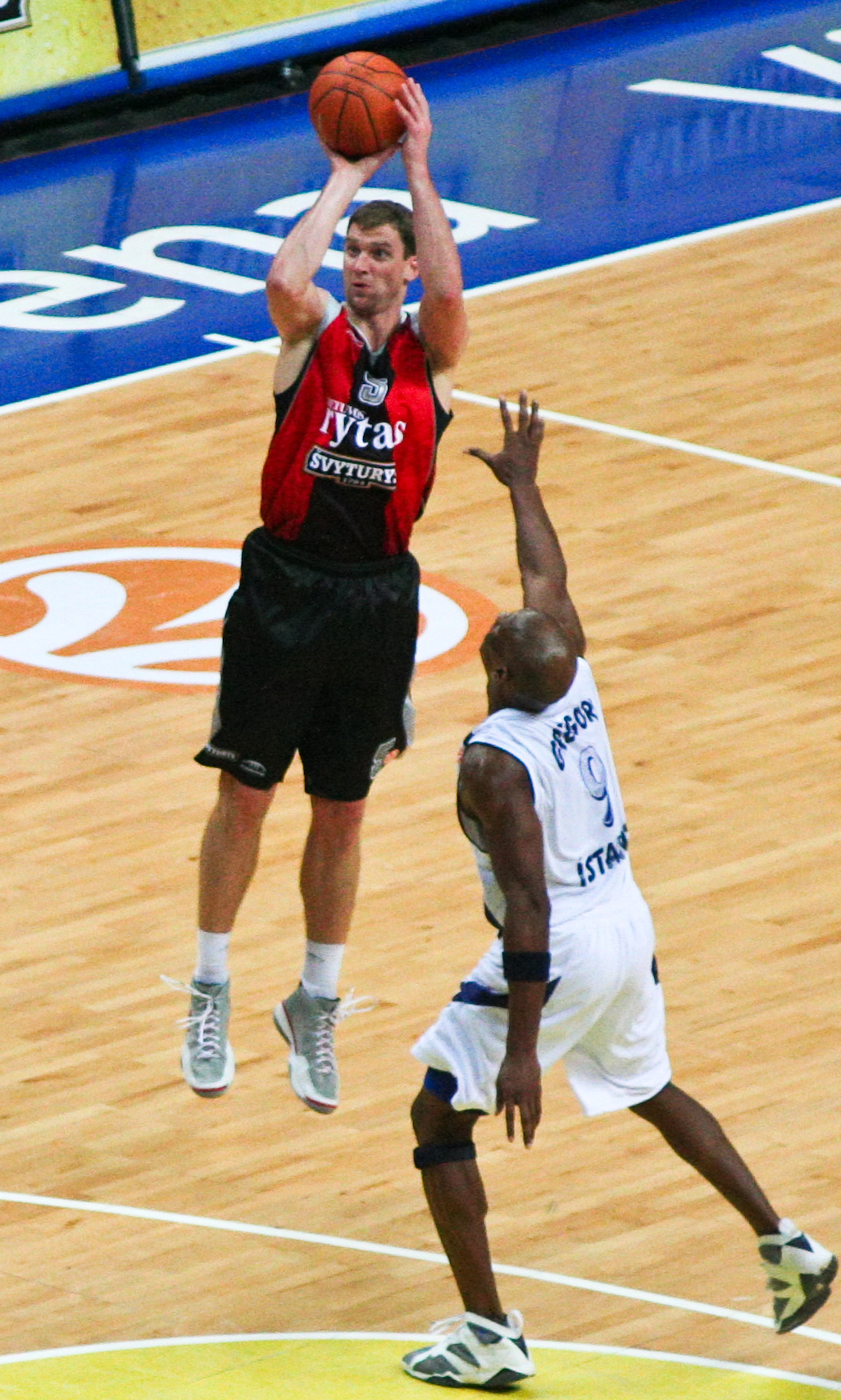
- Šležas, as a Lietuvos rytas player, in 2007.

Rytas-2 Vilnius
- Title: Assistant coach
- League: National Basketball League

Personal information
- Born: February 4, 1975 (age 51) Joniškis, Lithuanian SSR, Soviet Union
- Listed height: 6 ft 6.75 in (2.00 m)
- Listed weight: 220 lb (100 kg)

Career information
- Playing career: 1994–2014
- Position: Small forward / power forward
- Coaching career: 2014–present

Career history

Playing
- 1994–1997: BC Žiemgala
- 1997–1998: Statyba-Lietuvos rytas Vilnius
- 1998–1999: BC Šiauliai
- 1999–2008: Lietuvos rytas Vilnius
- 2008–2009: BC Šiauliai
- 2009–2011: Prostějov
- 2011–2012: Ežerūnas-Karys
- 2012–2014: Trakai

Coaching
- 2017–present: Perlas/Rytas-2 Vilnius (assistant)

Career highlights
- ULEB Cup champion (2005); 3× Lithuanian LKL champion (2000, 2002, 2006); Lithuanian LKF Cup winner (1998); Lithuanian LKL Finals MVP (2006); 2× Baltic BBL champion (2006, 2007); North European League champion (2002)

Andrius Šležas (born February 4, 1975) is a Lithuanian former professional basketball player and basketball coach. During his playing career, he was best known as a 3-point specialist.

== Professional playing career ==
Šležas was named the Lithuanian League's Finals MVP in 2006.

== Coaching career ==
Šležas began his coaching career in 2014.
