= Kęstutis Šeštokas =

Lithuanian basketball player

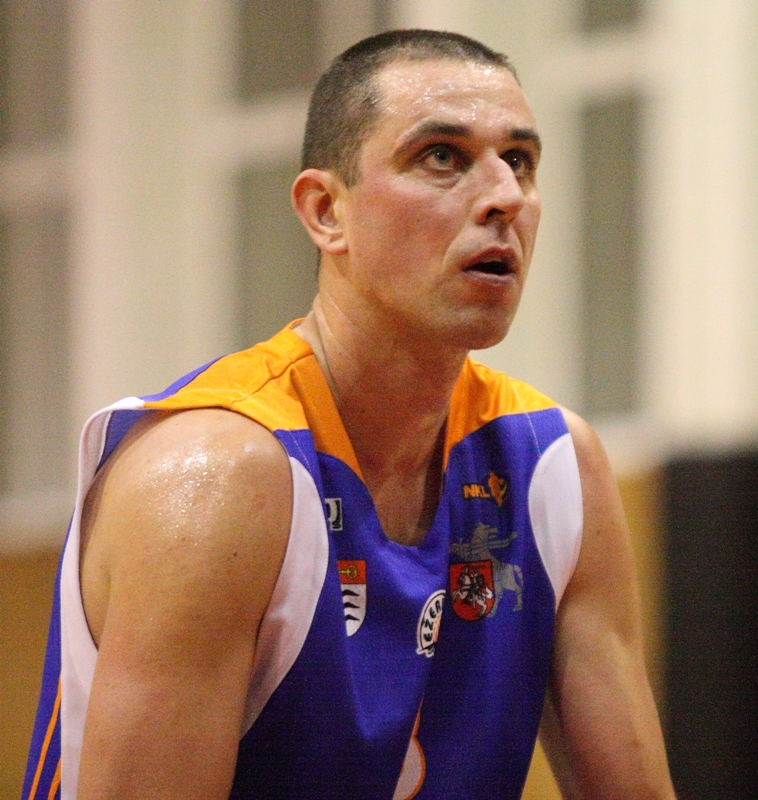

Personal information
- Born: April 15, 1976 (age 50) Kaunas, Lithuanian SSR, Soviet Union
- Listed height: 6 ft 7 1/2 in (2.02 m)
- Listed weight: 222 lb (101 kg)

Career information
- Playing career: 1993–2012
- Position: Power forward
- Number: 8

Career history
- 1993–2000: Žalgiris Kaunas
- 2000–2003: Lietuvos rytas Vilnius
- 2003–2004: BK Ventspils
- 2004–2005: Lietuvos rytas Vilnius
- 2005: BK Ventspils
- 2005: Khimik Yuzhny
- 2005–2006: AEL Limassol
- 2006–2007: UB La Palma
- 2007–2008: Tartu Ülikool/Rock
- 2008–2010: Rudupis Prienai
- 2010–2012: Ežerūnas-Karys

Career highlights
- 7× LKL champion (1994–1999, 2002); FIBA Saporta Cup champion (1998); EuroLeague champion (1999); NEBL champion (2002); 2× LBL champion (2004, 2005); Cypriot league champion (2006); NKL champion (2009); RKL champion (2011)
Medals
Men's basketball
Representing Lithuania
FIBA Europe U18 Championship
Gold medal – first place	1994 Israel	U-18 Team

Kęstutis Šeštokas (born April 15, 1976) is a Lithuanian former professional basketball player, who played at the power forward position. He is the only player who has won the domestic leagues (LKL, LBL, KML) of all three Baltic states. His major trophies include the Euroleague title in 1999, the ULEB Cup title in 2005 and the Saporta Cup in 1998 as well as many regional and domestic titles.

== Achievements ==
=== National team ===
- 1994 European U-18 Champion
- 1996 European U-20 Champion
- 1997 member of the Lithuanian squad at EuroBasket 1997

=== Club ===
- 1993–94 (Lithuania) Lithuanian League Championship (Žalgiris Kaunas)
- 1994–95 (Lithuania) Lithuanian League Championship (Žalgiris Kaunas)
- 1995–96 (Lithuania) Lithuanian League Championship (Žalgiris Kaunas)
- 1996–97 (Lithuania) Lithuanian League Championship (Žalgiris Kaunas)
- 1997–98 (Europe) EuroCup Championship (Žalgiris Kaunas)
- 1997–98 (Europe) Baltic Cup Championship (Žalgiris Kaunas)
- 1997–98 (Lithuania) Lithuanian League Championship (Žalgiris Kaunas)
- 1998–99 (Europe) Euroleague Championship (Žalgiris Kaunas)
- 1998–99 (Europe) NEBL Championship (Žalgiris Kaunas)
- 1998–99 (Lithuania) Lithuanian League Championship (Žalgiris Kaunas)
- 2001–02 (Europe) NEBL Championship (Lietuvos Rytas Vilnius)
- 2001–02 (Lithuania) Lithuanian League Championship (Lietuvos Rytas Vilnius)
- 2003–04 (Latvia) Latvian League Championship (BK Ventspils)
- 2004–05 (Europe) ULEB Cup Championship (Lietuvos Rytas Vilnius)
- 2004–05 (Latvia) Latvian League Championship (BK Ventspils)
- 2005–06 (Cyprus) Cypriot League Championship (AEL Limassol)
- 2007–08 (Estonia) Estonian League Championship (Tartu Ülikool/Rock)
- 2008–09 (Lithuania) NKL Championship (Rudupis Prienai)
- 2010–11 (Lithuania) RKL Championship (Molėtai Ežerūnas-Karys)
