= Artūras Javtokas =

Lithuanian basketball player

Personal information
- Born: January 27, 1977 (age 49) Šiauliai, Lithuania
- Listed height: 6 ft 9 in (2.06 m)
- Listed weight: 247 lb (112 kg)

Career information
- College: Clemson (1999–2000)
- Playing career: 1995–2005
- Position: Power forward / center

Career history
- 1995–1999: Šiauliai
- 2000–2001: Ural Great Perm
- 2001–2003: Lietuvos rytas Vilnius
- 2003–2005: Žalgiris Kaunas

Career highlights
- LKL Champion (2002, 2004); NEBL Champion (2002)

Artūras Javtokas (born January 27, 1977) is a retired Lithuanian professional basketball player. He is the older brother of Lithuania national team member Robertas Javtokas.
