= Marijonas Petravičius =

Lithuanian basketball player (born 1979)

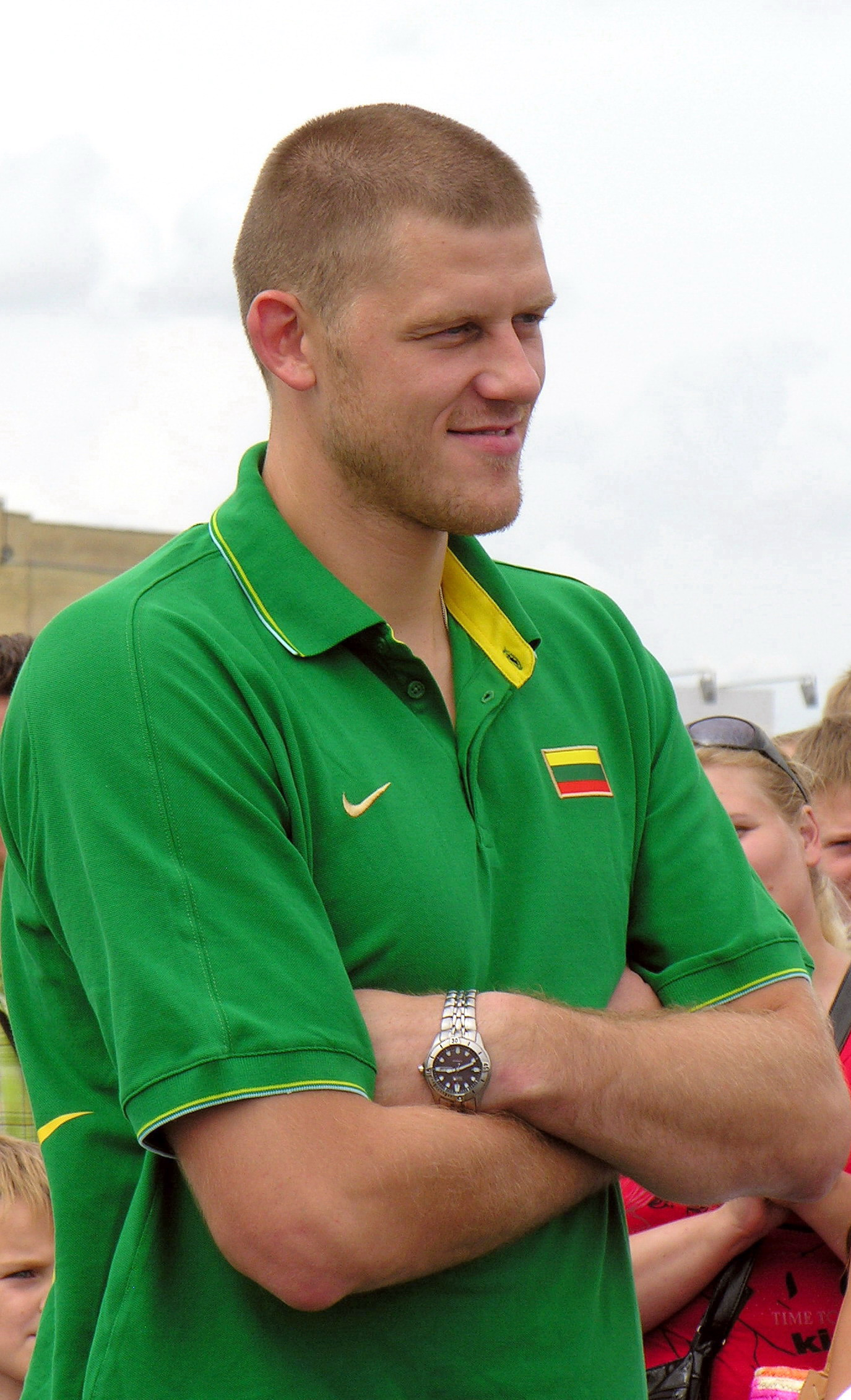

Personal information
- Born: October 24, 1979 (age 47) Šilalė, Lithuanian SSR, Soviet Union
- Listed height: 6 ft 10.25 in (2.09 m)
- Listed weight: 260 lb (118 kg)

Career information
- High school: New Hampton School (New Hampton, New Hampshire)
- College: South Carolina (1999–2003)
- NBA draft: 2003: undrafted
- Playing career: 2003–2012
- Position: Power forward / center

Career history
- 2003–2004: Mitteldeutscher BC
- 2004–2005: Telindus Oostende
- 2005–2006: Ventspils
- 2006: Al Qadsia
- 2006–2009: Lietuvos rytas Vilnius
- 2009–2011: Armani Jeans Milano
- 2011: Azovmash Mariupol
- 2012: Khimki Moscow Region

Career highlights
- EuroCup Finals MVP (2009); FIBA EuroCup Challenge Finals MVP (2004); 2× Lithuanian All-Star (2008, 2009); Latvian League Finals MVP (2006)

Marijonas Petravičius (born October 24, 1979) is a Lithuanian retired professional basketball player. He was a member of the Lithuania national team. He mainly played the center position, but he could also play the power forward position.

== Professional career ==
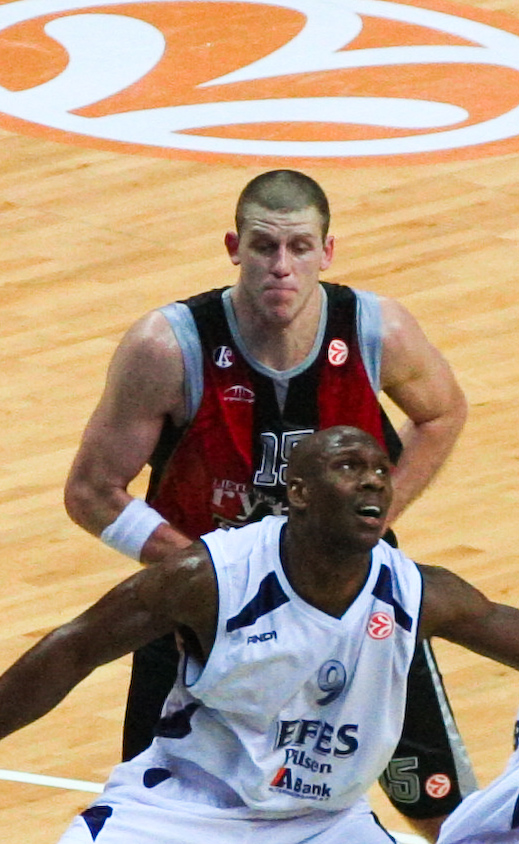
Marijonas Petravičius during his tenure with the Lietuvos rytas Vilnius

With his former club Mitteldeutscher BC, he won the FIBA EuroCup Challenge in 2004, being the Final Four MVP.

Petravičius arrived to Lietuvos rytas Vilnius in 2006, to replace Robertas Javtokas who left the team, and he quickly became the first choice center for the team. He helped Lietuvos rytas to reach the EuroCup final in 2007. In 2008 the team was competing in the EuroLeague, and in his first game Petravičius scored 29 points against Armani Jeans Milano.

Petravičius led Rytas to first place during the group stage, but during a practice Petravičius suffered a foot injury. With the club's three leaders injured: himself, Matthew Nielsen and Roberts Štelmahers, Rytas failed to enter the EuroLeague quarterfinals. He was named the EuroCup Finals MVP in 2009.

He joined the Italian club Armani Jeans Milano in 2009.

In August 2011, he agreed to terms with the Turkish team Beşiktaş Cola Turka Istanbul. However, Beşiktaş gave up on signing him after he was diagnosed with a lung problem. Later he signed a contract with Azovmash Mariupol, however he asked to wait one month for personal reasons. Azovmash declined to wait one month for him and terminated the contract.

On 16 January 2012 Petravičius signed with Khimki Moscow Region. He debuted in Khimki on 28 January 2012. He played only 5 minutes and scored 2 points, grabbed 1 rebound and made one assist, but he also made two turnovers and got one foul. However, this was his first and the last one game in Khimki, because his disease renewed. On 17 February 2012 Khimki terminated contract with Petravičius.

== Career statistics ==
Legend
GP	Games played	GS	Games started	MPG	Minutes per game
FG%	Field-goal percentage	3P%	3-point field-goal percentage	FT%	Free-throw percentage
RPG	Rebounds per game	APG	Assists per game	SPG	Steals per game
BPG	Blocks per game	PPG	Points per game	PIR	Performance index rating
**Bold**	Career high

=== EuroLeague ===
*	Led the league

Year	Team	GP	GS	MPG	FG%	3P%	FT%	RPG	APG	SPG	BPG	PPG	PIR
2007–08	Rytas	**17**	**16**	**25.1**	**.722***	—	.741	**5.6**	.3	**.6**	**.4**	**13.5**	**15.7**
2009–10	Milano	8	4	18.5	.617	—	**.756**	3.3	**.6**	.4	.3	9.1	10.4
2010–11	Milano	5	4	15.4	.630	—	.700	3.2	—	.4	—	8.2	6.8
Career		30	24	21.7	.699	.000	.743	4.6	.3	.5	.3	11.4	12.8

== National team career ==
Petravičius was a member of the senior Lithuanian national basketball team at the 2008 Summer Olympics tournament, where Lithuania finished in 4th place. He also participated in EuroBasket 2009 and EuroBasket 2011. During the latter tournament, however, he was forced to leave the team due to being diagnosed with a pulmonary embolism.

== Awards and achievements ==
- FIBA Europe Cup Champion: 2004
- FIBA Europe Cup Final Four MVP: 2004
- LBL Champion: 2006
- BBL Champion: 2007
- EuroLeague MVP of the Week runner up (scoring 29 points-career high): 2007
- BBL Vice-Champion: 2008
- LKL Vice-Champion: 2007, 2008
- LKF Vice-Champion: 2007, 2008
- LKF Cup Champion: 2009
- EuroCup Champion: 2009
- EuroCup Finals MVP: 2009
