= Lukas Brazdauskis =

Lithuanian basketball player (born 1988)

Personal information
- Born: October 1, 1988 (age 38) Kaunas, Lithuanian SSR, Soviet Union
- Listed height: 6 ft 8 in (2.03 m)
- Listed weight: 190 lb (86 kg)

Career information
- Playing career: 2007–2017
- Position: Small forward

Career history
- 2007–2010: Lietuvos Rytas
- 2010: BC Perlas
- 2010–2011: BC Nevėžis
- 2011–2012: BC Pieno žvaigždės
- 2012–2013: BC Dzūkija
- 2014: BC Barsy Atyrau
- 2014: BC Trakai
- 2014–2015: BC Nevėžis
- 2017: Vytis Šakiai
Medals
Men's basketball
Representing Lithuania
FIBA Europe Under-20 Championship
Silver medal – second place	2008 Latvia	U-20 Team
FIBA Europe Under-18 Championship
Silver medal – second place	2006 Greece	U-18 Team

Lukas Brazdauskis (born October 1, 1988) is a Lithuanian professional basketball player.
