= 2003 FIBA Under-19 World Championship =

International basketball tournament

2003 FIBA Under-19 Basketball World Cup
Tournament details
- Host country: Greece
- Dates: 10–20 July
- Teams: 16 (from 5 federations)
- Venues: 2 (in 1 host city)

Final positions
- Champions: Australia (1st title)

Tournament statistics
- MVP: (Australia) Andrew Bogut
- Top scorer: (Lithuania) Linas Kleiza (29.1)
- Top rebounds: (Australia) Andrew Bogut (17.0)
- Top assists: (Puerto Rico) J. J. Barea (5.9) (South Korea) Kim Tae-sul
- PPG (Team): Australia (97.3)
- RPG (Team): Australia (45.6)
- APG (Team): Argentina (19.0)

Official website
- 2003 FIBA U19 World Championship

The 2003 FIBA Under-19 World Championship (Greek: 2003 Παγκόσμιο Πρωτάθλημα FIBA Under-19) was the 7th edition of the FIBA U19 World Championship organized by FIBA. It was held in the Greek city of Thessaloniki from 10 to 20 July 2003. Australia won the tournament by beating Lithuania, 126–92, in the final, for their maiden title. Andrew Bogut was named the tournament MVP.

== Venue ==
The tournament was supposed to be held in Penang and Kuala Lumpur, Malaysia, however due to 2002–2004 SARS outbreak, on 25 May 2003, FIBA Central Board decided to move the competition to another venue. Greece, which previously hosted the 1995 edition, stepped forward to host the tournament.

| Location | City | Round |
|---|---|---|
| 2003 FIBA Under-19 World Championship is located in Greece | Thessaloniki | All Rounds |

== Qualified teams ==
| Means of Qualification | Dates | Venue | Berths | Qualifiers |
|---|---|---|---|---|
| Host Nation | 25 May 2003 | —N/a | 1 | Greece |
| 2002 FIBA Under-18 African Championship | 2–9 August 2002 | (Egypt) Cairo | 2 | Nigeria; Angola |
| 2002 FIBA Under-18 Americas Championship | 24–28 July 2002 | (Venezuela) La Asunción | 4 | Puerto Rico; Venezuela; United States; Argentina |
| 2002 FIBA Under-18 Asian Championship | 16–26 December 2002 | Kuwait City | 4 | China; Iran; South Korea; Malaysia^{1} |
| 2002 FIBA Under-18 European Championship | 12–21 July 2002 | (Germany) Böblingen | 4 | Croatia; Slovenia; Lithuania; Turkey^{2} |
| 2002 FIBA Under-18 Oceania Championship | —N/a | (Australia) Sydney | 1 | Australia |
| Total | | | 16 | |

^{1}Asia has 3 slots allotted and Malaysia qualified to the world championships as the initial hosts of the competition before it was relocated to Greece. Malaysia's qualification has been retained as no changes on the participation teams took place.
^{2}Europe has 4 slots allotted and Greece qualified to the world championships as third placers. As Greece became the tournament hosts, fifth placer Turkey qualified to fill up the remaining European slot as a result.

== Preliminary round ==
=== Group A ===
| Pos | Team | Pld | W | L | PF | PA | PD | Pts | Qualification |
|---|---|---|---|---|---|---|---|---|---|
| 1 | Australia | 3 | 3 | 0 | 279 | 226 | +53 | 6 | Quarterfinal Round |
| 2 | Turkey | 3 | 2 | 1 | 226 | 225 | +1 | 5 | Quarterfinal Round |
| 3 | Argentina | 3 | 1 | 2 | 209 | 213 | −4 | 4 | Classification Round |
| 4 | South Korea | 3 | 0 | 3 | 242 | 292 | −50 | 3 | Classification Round |

Source: FIBA
Rules for classification: 1) points; 2) head-to-head points difference.

10 July 2003
16:45

Boxscore

| Argentina | 87–67 | South Korea |
Scoring by quarter: 18–17, 14–17, 20–22, 35–11
| Pts: Alloatti 22; Rebs: Alloatti 14; Asts: four players 3 | | Pts: Ha 16; Rebs: Ha, Yang 10; Asts: Kim T. 7 |

Thessaloniki

10 July 2003
21:15

Boxscore

| Turkey | 74–80 | Australia |
Scoring by quarter: 17–25, 15–20, 21–19, 21–16
| Pts: Atsür 37; Rebs: Pastal 12; Asts: Kutruza, Göktug Ezel 3 | | Pts: Bogut 22; Rebs: Bogut 10; Asts: Marković 4 |

Thessaloniki

11 July 2003
16:45

Boxscore

| South Korea | 80–81 | Turkey |
Scoring by quarter: 16–21, 21–18, 23–19, 20–23
| Pts: Lee Y. 25; Rebs: Ha 18; Asts: Kim T. 10 | | Pts: Kaya 20; Rebs: Atsür 10; Asts: Atsür 6 |

Thessaloniki

11 July 2003
21:15

Boxscore

| Australia | 75–57 | Argentina |
Scoring by quarter: 17–25, 15–20, 21–19, 21–16
| Pts: Bogut 25; Rebs: Bogut 24; Asts: Marković, Carter 3 | | Pts: Alloatti 14; Rebs: Sandes 9 Asts: Figueroa 4 |

Thessaloniki

12 July 2003
19:00

Boxscore

| South Korea | 95–124 | Australia |
Scoring by quarter: 27–32, 11–39, 38–23, 19–30
| Pts: Lee K. 26; Rebs: Yang 6 Asts: Yang 7 | | Pts: Bogut 33; Rebs: Bogut 25; Asts: Bruce 7 |

Thessaloniki

12 July 2003
21:15

Boxscore

| Turkey | 71–65 | Argentina |
Scoring by quarter: 19–11, 22–16, 11–15, 19–23
| Pts: Kutruza 16; Rebs: Daloğlu 11; Asts: Kutruza, Atsür 2 | | Pts: Muruaga, Zago 19; Rebs: Zago 11; Asts: Figueroa 4 |

Thessaloniki

=== Group B ===
| Pos | Team | Pld | W | L | PF | PA | PD | Pts | Qualification |
|---|---|---|---|---|---|---|---|---|---|
| 1 | Greece (H) | 3 | 3 | 0 | 293 | 204 | +89 | 6 | Quarterfinal Round |
| 2 | Puerto Rico | 3 | 2 | 1 | 260 | 240 | +20 | 5 | Quarterfinal Round |
| 3 | Angola | 3 | 1 | 2 | 210 | 222 | −12 | 4 | Classification Round |
| 4 | Iran | 3 | 0 | 3 | 172 | 269 | −97 | 3 | Classification Round |

Source: FIBA
Rules for classification: 1) points; 2) head-to-head points difference.
(H) Hosts

10 July 2003
14:30

Boxscore

| Iran | 50–74 | Angola |
Scoring by quarter: 17–13, 16–11, 9–18, 8–32
| Pts: Monavari 11; Rebs: Sahakian 10; Asts: four players 1 | | Pts: J. dos Santos 26; Rebs: da Silva Neto 9 Asts: Bonifácio, Barros 4 |

Thessaloniki

10 July 2003
21:15

Boxscore

| Greece | 103–83 | Puerto Rico |
Scoring by quarter: 25–23, 20–22, 27–18, 31–20
| Pts: Vasileiadis 32; Rebs: Schortsanitis 14; Asts: Perperoglou 5 | | Pts: Barea, Verdejo 27; Rebs: Ramos 8 Asts: Barea 5 |

Thessaloniki

11 July 2003
16:45

Boxscore

| Puerto Rico | 92–66 | Iran |
Scoring by quarter: 16–12, 32–19, 21–20, 23–15
| Pts: Barea 19; Rebs: Orozco 13; Asts: Rosas 5 | | Pts: Amini 20; Rebs: Rouzbahani 10; Asts: Zamani 2 |

Thessaloniki

11 July 2003
21:15

Boxscore

| Angola | 65–87 | Greece |
Scoring by quarter: 16–18, 14–23, 15–19, 20–27
| Pts: Barros 31; Rebs: Morais 7 Asts: three players 2 | | Pts: Vasileiadis 23; Rebs: Schortsanitis 7 Asts: Xanthopoulos 6 |

Thessaloniki

12 July 2003
16:45

Boxscore

| Angola | 71–85 | Puerto Rico |
Scoring by quarter: 27–32, 11–39, 38–23, 19–30
| Pts: Barros 21; Rebs: M. dos Santos 12; Asts: J. dos Santos 3 | | Pts: Barea 28; Rebs: Vassallo 9 Asts: Barea 6 |

Thessaloniki

12 July 2003
21:15

Boxscore

| Greece | 103–56 | Iran |
Scoring by quarter: 21–18, 24–18, 23–8, 35–12
| Pts: Vasileiadis 28; Rebs: Vasileiadis, Schortsanitis 10; Asts: Sourlis, Xanthopoulos 7 | | Pts: Zamani 16; Rebs: Zamani 10; Asts: six players 1 |

Thessaloniki

=== Group C ===
| Pos | Team | Pld | W | L | PF | PA | PD | Pts | Qualification |
|---|---|---|---|---|---|---|---|---|---|
| 1 | United States | 3 | 3 | 0 | 281 | 236 | +45 | 6 | Quarterfinal Round |
| 2 | Slovenia | 3 | 2 | 1 | 272 | 227 | +45 | 5 | Quarterfinal Round |
| 3 | Nigeria | 3 | 1 | 2 | 226 | 259 | −33 | 4 | Classification Round |
| 4 | China | 3 | 0 | 3 | 231 | 288 | −57 | 3 | Classification Round |

Source: FIBA
Rules for classification: 1) points; 2) head-to-head points difference.

10 July 2003
14:30

Boxscore

| China | 69–92 | Nigeria |
Scoring by quarter: 29–18, 4–19, 16–26, 20–29
| Pts: Yi J. 24; Rebs: Yi J. 12; Asts: Zhao 5 | | Pts: Odia 21; Rebs: Echefu 8 Asts: Tat 5 |

Thessaloniki

10 July 2003
19:00

Boxscore

| Slovenia | 83–84 | United States |
Scoring by quarter: 28–18, 16–25, 15–21, 24–20
| Pts: Lorbek 28; Rebs: Šmigić 11; Asts: Močnik 7 | | Pts: Davis 24; Rebs: Davis 14; Asts: Watson, Williams 6 |

Thessaloniki

11 July 2003
14:30

Boxscore

| Nigeria | 65–102 | Slovenia |
Scoring by quarter: 24–21, 16–22, 12–34, 13–25
| Pts: Tat 21; Rebs: Ugboaja 10; Asts: Tat, Odia 2 | | Pts: Močnik 18; Rebs: E. Lorbek 11; Asts: Močnik 10 |

Thessaloniki

11 July 2003
19:00

Boxscore

| United States | 109–84 | China |
Scoring by quarter: 24–23, 30–17, 31–22, 24–22
| Pts: Williams 23; Rebs: Alexander 9 Asts: Williams 6 | | Pts: Wang 18; Rebs: Yi J. 10; Asts: Yi J., Zhang Q. 3 |

Thessaloniki

12 July 2003
14:30

Boxscore

| Slovenia | 87–78 | China |
Scoring by quarter: 22–16, 20–15, 23–17, 22–30
| Pts: Zagorac 23; Rebs: E. Lorbek 8 Asts: Močnik 4 | | Pts: Yi J. 29; Rebs: Yi J., Tang 12; Asts: Zhang Q. 7 |

Thessaloniki

12 July 2003
16:45

Boxscore

| Nigeria | 69–88 | United States |
Scoring by quarter: 13–21, 19–23, 26–27, 11–17
| Pts: Tat 18; Rebs: Soroye 9 Asts: Odia 4 | | Pts: Alexander 13; Rebs: Davis 10; Asts: Williams 5 |

Thessaloniki

=== Group D ===
| Pos | Team | Pld | W | L | PF | PA | PD | Pts | Qualification |
|---|---|---|---|---|---|---|---|---|---|
| 1 | Croatia | 3 | 3 | 0 | 258 | 208 | +50 | 6 | Quarterfinal Round |
| 2 | Lithuania | 3 | 2 | 1 | 284 | 172 | +112 | 5 | Quarterfinal Round |
| 3 | Venezuela | 3 | 1 | 2 | 222 | 243 | −21 | 4 | Classification Round |
| 4 | Malaysia | 3 | 0 | 3 | 164 | 305 | −141 | 3 | Classification Round |

Source: FIBA
Rules for classification: 1) points; 2) head-to-head points difference.

10 July 2003
16:45

Boxscore

| Lithuania | 69–73 | Croatia |
Scoring by quarter: 18–16, 17–22, 14–17, 20–18
| Pts: Kleiza 26; Rebs: Kleiza 13; Asts: Lekavičius, Jankūnas 2 | | Pts: Ukić, Pašalić 20; Rebs: Pašalić 22; Asts: Ukić 3 |

Thessaloniki

10 July 2003
19:00

Boxscore

| Venezuela | 88–60 | Malaysia |
Scoring by quarter: 16–12, 36–22, 20–11, 16–15
| Pts: Urdaneta 27; Rebs: Marriaga 13; Asts: Centeno 5 | | Pts: Cheong Y. 18; Rebs: Soo 6 Asts: three players 1 |

Thessaloniki

11 July 2003
14:30

Boxscore

| Croatia | 75–74 | Venezuela |
Scoring by quarter: 17–21, 30–13, 10–21, 18–19
| Pts: Banić 16; Rebs: Pašalić 12; Asts: Perić, Kralj 2 | | Pts: Palacios 20; Rebs: Marriaga 16; Asts: Urdaneta 4 |

Thessaloniki

11 July 2003
19:00

Boxscore

| Malaysia | 39–107 | Lithuania |
Scoring by quarter: 11–27, 13–29, 6–24, 9–27
| Pts: three players 7 Rebs: Koo, Cheong J. 4 Asts: Cheong Y. 3 | | Pts: Kleiza 28; Rebs: Šilinskis 11; Asts: Babrauskas 4 |

Thessaloniki

12 July 2003
14:30

Boxscore

| Lithuania | 108–60 | Venezuela |
Scoring by quarter: 31–11, 35–30, 20–6, 22–13
| Pts: Maceina 28; Rebs: Šilinskis 10; Asts: Dabkus 4 | | Pts: Palacios 10; Rebs: Marriaga, Urbina 6 Asts: three players 2 |

Thessaloniki

12 July 2003
19:00

Boxscore

| Malaysia | 65–110 | Croatia |
Scoring by quarter: 13–30, 14–27, 20–27, 18–26
| Pts: Chan 12; Rebs: Chan, Ang 4 Asts: Koo, Khor 2 | | Pts: Ukić 22; Rebs: Markota 10; Asts: Ukić 6 |

Thessaloniki

== Quarterfinal round ==
=== Group E ===
| Pos | Team | Pld | W | L | PF | PA | PD | Pts | Qualification |
|---|---|---|---|---|---|---|---|---|---|
| 1 | Australia | 3 | 2 | 1 | 276 | 263 | +13 | 5 (Note: 1−1, 1.066 (beaten United States, lost to Lithuania)) | Semi-finals |
| 2 | Lithuania | 3 | 2 | 1 | 270 | 251 | +19 | 5 (Note: 1−1, 1.034 (beaten Australia, lost to United States)) | Semi-finals |
| 3 | United States | 3 | 2 | 1 | 278 | 262 | +16 | 5 (Note: 1−1, 0.905 (beaten Lithuania, lost to Australia)) | 5th–8th Classification |
| 4 | Puerto Rico | 3 | 0 | 3 | 231 | 279 | −48 | 3 | 5th–8th Classification |

Source: FIBA
Rules for classification: 1) points; 2) head-to-head points difference.
Notes:

14 July 2003
14:30

Boxscore

| Australia | 87–96 | Lithuania |
Scoring by quarter: 14–25, 23–34, 27–18, 23–19
| Pts: Marković 19; Rebs: Bogut 8 Asts: Marković 5 | | Pts: Kleiza 30; Rebs: Šilinskis 10; Asts: Prekevičius, Šilinskis 4 |

Thessaloniki

14 July 2003
16:45

Boxscore

| United States | 106–72 | Puerto Rico |
Scoring by quarter: 27–19, 21–15, 23–16, 35–22
| Pts: Alexander 23; Rebs: Alexander, Davis 9 Asts: D. Brown 7 | | Pts: Barea 35; Rebs: Ramos, Vassallo 7 Asts: Barea 4 |

Thessaloniki

15 July 2003
14:30

Boxscore

| Puerto Rico | 82–83 | Australia |
Scoring by quarter: 22–32, 14–14, 26–17, 20–20
| Pts: Barea 25; Rebs: Ramos 14; Asts: Barea 8 | | Pts: Bogut 18; Rebs: Bogut 12; Asts: Martin, Marković 4 |

Thessaloniki

15 July 2003
16:45

Boxscore

| Lithuania | 84–87 | United States |
Scoring by quarter: 29–17, 11–26, 24–21, 20–23
| Pts: Kleiza 28; Rebs: Jankūnas 13; Asts: Prekevičius, Šilinskis 4 | | Pts: D. Brown 47; Rebs: Hollins 9 Asts: D. Brown 6 |

Thessaloniki

16 July 2003
14:30

Boxscore

| Puerto Rico | 77–90 | Lithuania |
Scoring by quarter: 18–27, 16–16, 22–18, 21–29
| Pts: Barea 26; Rebs: Ramos 10; Asts: Barea 9 | | Pts: Kleiza 42; Rebs: Jankūnas 15; Asts: Prekevičius 6 |

Thessaloniki

16 July 2003
16:45

Boxscore

| Australia | 106–85 | United States |
Scoring by quarter: 21–21, 39–27, 25–20, 21–17
| Pts: Bruce 25; Rebs: Bogut 18; Asts: Bogut, Carter 5 | | Pts: Davis 28; Rebs: Davis 15; Asts: D. Brown 7 |

Thessaloniki

=== Group F ===
| Pos | Team | Pld | W | L | PF | PA | PD | Pts | Qualification |
|---|---|---|---|---|---|---|---|---|---|
| 1 | Greece (H) | 3 | 2 | 1 | 232 | 183 | +49 | 5 (Note: 1−1, 1.153 (beaten Turkey, lost to Croatia)) | Semi-finals |
| 2 | Croatia | 3 | 2 | 1 | 264 | 262 | +2 | 5 (Note: 1−1, 0.950 (beaten Greece, lost to Turkey)) | Semi-finals |
| 3 | Turkey | 3 | 2 | 1 | 232 | 217 | +15 | 5 (Note: 1−1, 0.924 (beaten Croatia, lost to Greece)) | 5th–8th Classification |
| 4 | Slovenia | 3 | 0 | 3 | 215 | 281 | −66 | 3 | 5th–8th Classification |

Source: FIBA
Rules for classification: 1) points; 2) head-to-head points difference.
(H) Hosts
Notes:

14 July 2003
19:00

Boxscore

| Turkey | 87–78 | Croatia |
Scoring by quarter: 21–23, 20–18, 18–20, 28–17
| Pts: Atsür 41; Rebs: Daloğlu 10; Asts: Kutruza 6 | | Pts: Tomas 18; Rebs: Pašalić 11; Asts: Kedžo 3 |

Thessaloniki

14 July 2003
21:15

Boxscore

| Slovenia | 52–81 | Greece |
Scoring by quarter: 17–24, 11–24, 13–12, 11–21
| Pts: Lorbek 13; Rebs: Rizvić 9 Asts: Močnik, Zagorac 2 | | Pts: Schortsanitis 28; Rebs: three players 6 Asts: Xanthopoulos, Vasilopoulos 3 |

Thessaloniki
Attendance: 2300

15 July 2003
19:00

Boxscore

| Croatia | 113–103 (2OT) | Slovenia |
Scoring by quarter: 22–21, 24–21, 19–26, 21–18, Overtime: 11–11, 16–6
| Pts: Ukić 36; Rebs: Pašalić 22; Asts: Ukić 6 | | Pts: E. Lorbek 37; Rebs: E. Lorbek 13; Asts: Močnik 6 |

Thessaloniki

15 July 2003
21:15

Boxscore

| Greece | 79–58 | Turkey |
Scoring by quarter: 21–18, 19–9, 13–15, 26–16
| Pts: Schortsanitis 23; Rebs: Schortsanitis 15; Asts: Xanthopoulos 6 | | Pts: Atsür 13; Rebs: Pastal, Topaloğlu 7 Asts: seven players 1 |

Thessaloniki

16 July 2003
19:00

Boxscore

| Turkey | 87–60 | Slovenia |
Scoring by quarter: 22–21, 24–21, 19–26, 21–18
| Pts: Kaya 19; Rebs: Topaloğlu 8 Asts: Atsür 4 | | Pts: Močnik 14; Rebs: Urbanc 11; Asts: Močnik, Zagorac 3 |

Thessaloniki

16 July 2003
21:15

Boxscore

| Greece | 72–73 | Croatia |
Scoring by quarter: 21–18, 19–9, 13–15, 26–16
| Pts: Vasileiadis, Schortsanitis 16; Rebs: Schortsanitis 12; Asts: Vasileiadis 5 | | Pts: Pašalić 20; Rebs: Pašalić 14; Asts: Tomas 5 |

Thessaloniki
Attendance: 2000

=== Group G ===
| Pos | Team | Pld | W | L | PF | PA | PD | Pts | Qualification |
|---|---|---|---|---|---|---|---|---|---|
| 1 | Argentina | 3 | 3 | 0 | 290 | 173 | +117 | 6 | 9th–12th Classification |
| 2 | Nigeria | 3 | 2 | 1 | 247 | 208 | +39 | 5 | 9th–12th Classification |
| 3 | Iran | 3 | 1 | 2 | 194 | 230 | −36 | 4 | 13th–16th Classification |
| 4 | Malaysia | 3 | 0 | 3 | 160 | 280 | −120 | 3 | 13th–16th Classification |

Source: FIBA
Rules for classification: 1) points; 2) head-to-head points difference.

14 July 2003
19:00

Boxscore

| Nigeria | 78–53 | Iran |
Scoring by quarter: 18–14, 24–14, 23–10, 13–15
| Pts: Odia 19; Rebs: Ugboaja 17; Asts: three players 3 | | Pts: Amini 17; Rebs: Amini 8 Asts: Forooghi 3 |

Thessaloniki

14 July 2003
21:15

Boxscore

| Argentina | 105–38 | Malaysia |
Scoring by quarter: 34–18, 23–7, 31–2, 17–11
| Pts: Muruaga, Sandes 15; Rebs: Zago 7 Asts: Muruaga 6 | | Pts: Ang 7 Rebs: Khor 9 Asts: three players 1 |

Thessaloniki

15 July 2003
19:00

Boxscore

| Iran | 62–94 | Argentina |
Scoring by quarter: 12–25, 14–23, 19–24, 17–22
| Pts: Zamani 19; Rebs: Rouzbahani 9 Asts: Amel, Sahakian 2 | | Pts: Rodriguez 18; Rebs: Alloatti, Mainoldi 9 Asts: Fioretti 6 |

Thessaloniki

15 July 2003
21:15

Boxscore

| Malaysia | 64–96 | Nigeria |
Scoring by quarter: 12–27, 16–22, 15–26, 21–21
| Pts: Ang 13; Rebs: Ang 6 Asts: Cheong Y., Soo 2 | | Pts: Odia 21; Rebs: Ugboaja 14; Asts: Alayande 7 |

Thessaloniki

16 July 2003
19:00

Boxscore

| Iran | 79–58 | Malaysia |
Scoring by quarter: 26–10, 9–10, 20–13, 24–25
| Pts: Rouzbahani 20; Rebs: Amini 9 Asts: Forooghi 4 | | Pts: Khor 14; Rebs: Alloatti, Mainoldi 9 Asts: Ang, Koo 2 |

Thessaloniki

16 July 2003
21:15

Boxscore

| Argentina | 91–73 | Nigeria |
Scoring by quarter: 28–15, 24–19, 20–16, 19–23
| Pts: Muruaga 19; Rebs: Sandes 13; Asts: Figueroa 6 | | Pts: Usman 21; Rebs: Ugboaja 12; Asts: Alayande 2 |

Thessaloniki

=== Group H ===
| Pos | Team | Pld | W | L | PF | PA | PD | Pts | Qualification |
|---|---|---|---|---|---|---|---|---|---|
| 1 | Venezuela | 3 | 3 | 0 | 250 | 204 | +46 | 6 | 9th–12th Classification |
| 2 | South Korea | 3 | 2 | 1 | 286 | 253 | +33 | 5 | 9th–12th Classification |
| 3 | China | 3 | 1 | 2 | 217 | 241 | −24 | 4 | 13th–16th Classification |
| 4 | Angola | 3 | 0 | 3 | 204 | 259 | −55 | 3 | 13th–16th Classification |

Source: FIBA
Rules for classification: 1) points; 2) head-to-head points difference.

14 July 2003
14:30

Boxscore

| China | 87–64 | Angola |
Scoring by quarter: 16–21, 21–18, 23–19, 20–23
| Pts: Yi J. 25; Rebs: Yi J. 18; Asts: Meng 8 | | Pts: Barros 23; Rebs: Morais, M. dos Santos 6 Asts: Barros 7 |

Thessaloniki

14 July 2003
16:45

Boxscore

| South Korea | 84–103 | Venezuela |
Scoring by quarter: 17–25, 15–20, 21–19, 21–16
| Pts: Kim T. 21; Rebs: Yang 6 Asts: Kim T. 5 | | Pts: Marriaga 32; Rebs: Marriaga 12; Asts: Palacios, Urdaneta 4 |

Thessaloniki

15 July 2003
14:30

Boxscore

| Venezuela | 76–58 | China |
Scoring by quarter: 21–16, 24–10, 19–20, 12–12
| Pts: Marriaga 23; Rebs: Marriaga 10; Asts: Centeno, Urdaneta 4 | | Pts: Zhao 14; Rebs: Yi J. 13; Asts: Zhang Q. 3 |

Thessaloniki

15 July 2003
16:45

Boxscore

| Angola | 78–101 | South Korea |
Scoring by quarter: 20–29, 18–17, 18–26, 22–16
| Pts: Barros 30; Rebs: Mbunga 9 Asts: J. dos Santos, Bonifácio 2 | | Pts: Lee K. 37; Rebs: Ha 8 Asts: Yim 7 |

Thessaloniki

16 July 2003
14:30

Boxscore

| South Korea | 101–72 | China |
Scoring by quarter: 22–8, 30–19, 27–26, 22–19
| Pts: Ha 21; Rebs: Ha 14; Asts: Cha, Kim T. 8 | | Pts: Yi J. 21; Rebs: Yi J. 11; Asts: Wang 3 |

Thessaloniki

16 July 2003
16:45

Boxscore

| Angola | 62–71 | Venezuela |
Scoring by quarter: 20–29, 18–17, 18–26, 22–16
| Pts: J. dos Santos 17; Rebs: Mbunga 9 Asts: Morais 2 | | Pts: Palacios 19; Rebs: Palacios 9 Asts: Palacios 3 |

Thessaloniki

== Classification 13th–16th ==
13th–16th classification
18 July – Thessaloniki
Malaysia | 71
China | 101
18 July – Thessaloniki
Iran | 60
Angola | 63

Thirteenth place
19 July – Thessaloniki
China | 73
Angola | 85
Fifteenth place
19 July – Thessaloniki
Malaysia | 77
Iran | 67

=== Semifinals ===
18 July 2003
14:30

Boxscore

| Malaysia | 71–101 | China |
Scoring by quarter: 14–25, 19–26, 17–27, 21–23
| Pts: Phang 11; Rebs: Cheong Y. 5 Asts: Cheong Y. 5 | | Pts: Zhao 20; Rebs: Wang 13; Asts: four players 3 |

Thessaloniki

18 July 2003
16:45

Boxscore

| Iran | 60–63 | Angola |
Scoring by quarter: 13–21, 19–23, 26–27, 11–17
| Pts: Rouzbahani 22; Rebs: Rouzbahani 7 Asts: Amini 7 | | Pts: Barros 14; Rebs: da Silva Neto 18; Asts: Barros 3 |

Thessaloniki

=== 15th place ===
19 July 2003
10:00

Boxscore

| Malaysia | 77–67 | Iran |
Scoring by quarter: 12–18, 20–8, 19–22, 26–19
| Pts: Phang 15; Rebs: Cheong J. 8 Asts: Zamani 18 | | Pts: Zhao 20; Rebs: Rouzbahani 15; Asts: Amini 4 |

Thessaloniki

=== 13th place ===
19 July 2003
12:15

Boxscore

| China | 73–85 | Angola |
Scoring by quarter: 27–19, 21–17, 9–18, 16–31
| Pts: Zhao 14; Rebs: Yi J. 10; Asts: Zhang Q. 6 | | Pts: J. dos Santos 23; Rebs: Mbunga 9 Asts: Bonifácio 3 |

Thessaloniki

== Classification 9th–12th ==
9th–12th classification
18 July – Thessaloniki
Argentina | 89
South Korea | 83
18 July – Thessaloniki
Nigeria | 74
Venezuela | 76

Ninth place
20 July – Thessaloniki
Argentina | 76
Venezuela | 78
Eleventh place
20 July – Thessaloniki
South Korea | 70
Nigeria | 99

=== Semifinals ===
18 July 2003
19:00

Boxscore

| Argentina | 89–83 | South Korea |
Scoring by quarter: 23–20, 23–21, 19–25, 24–17
| Pts: Muruaga 15; Rebs: Sandes 13; Asts: Figueroa 8 | | Pts: Lee K. 20; Rebs: Yang 13; Asts: Lee K., Kim T. 3 |

Thessaloniki

18 July 2003
21:15

Boxscore

| Nigeria | 74–76 | Venezuela |
Scoring by quarter: 22–24, 15–9, 11–24, 26–19
| Pts: Odia 20; Rebs: Ibikunle 8 Asts: Odia 3 | | Pts: Cedeño 24; Rebs: Marriaga 12; Asts: three players 2 |

Thessaloniki

=== 11th place ===
20 July 2003
10:00

Boxscore

| South Korea | 70–99 | Nigeria |
Scoring by quarter: 28–20, 14–26, 9–26, 19–27
| Pts: Yim 15; Rebs: Kim T., Lee Y. 5 Asts: Kim T., Yim 5 | | Pts: Odia 24; Rebs: Ejike 10; Asts: Odia 9 |

Thessaloniki

=== 9th place ===
20 July 2003
12:15

Boxscore

| Argentina | 76–78 | Venezuela |
Scoring by quarter: 15–23, 16–19, 19–16, 26–20
| Pts: Yim 15; Rebs: Kim T., Lee Y. 5 Asts: Kim T., Yim 5 | | Pts: Sandes, Rodriguez 18; Rebs: Sandes 14; Asts: Treise 4 |

Thessaloniki

== Classification 5th–8th ==
5th–8th classification
19 July – Thessaloniki
United States | 77
Slovenia | 72
19 July – Thessaloniki
Puerto Rico | 85
Turkey | 78

Fifth place
20 July – Thessaloniki
United States | 82
Puerto Rico | 80
Seventh place
20 July – Thessaloniki
Slovenia | 67
Turkey | 63

=== Semifinals ===
19 July 2003
14:30

Boxscore

| United States | 77–72 | Slovenia |
Scoring by quarter: 23–21, 12–18, 22–14, 20–19
| Pts: Davis 20; Rebs: Davis 8 Asts: Shakur 4 | | Pts: Zagorac 26; Rebs: E. Lorbek 15; Asts: Močnik, Šmigić 4 |

Thessaloniki

19 July 2003
16:45

Boxscore

| Puerto Rico | 85–78 | Turkey |
Scoring by quarter: 29–28, 16–16, 14–23, 26–11
| Pts: Barea 24; Rebs: Ramos 21; Asts: Barea 5 | | Pts: Pastal 23; Rebs: Pastal 15; Asts: Demirel 6 |

Thessaloniki

=== 7th place ===
20 July 2003
14:30

Boxscore

| Slovenia | 67–63 | Turkey |
Scoring by quarter: 17–16, 15–18, 11–17, 24–12
| Pts: Zagorac 21; Rebs: E. Lorbek 11; Asts: Zagorac 4 | | Pts: Atsür 20; Rebs: Pastal 10; Asts: Kaya, Atsür 3 |

Thessaloniki

=== 5th place ===
20 July 2003
16:45

Boxscore

| United States | 82–80 | Puerto Rico |
Scoring by quarter: 17–16, 15–18, 11–17, 24–12
| Pts: Pittsnogle 17; Rebs: Alexander 11; Asts: Williams 6 | | Pts: Barea 32; Rebs: Ramos 16; Asts: Barea 6 |

Thessaloniki

== Final round ==
Semi-finals
19 July – Thessaloniki
Australia | 97
Croatia | 84
19 July – Thessaloniki
Lithuania | 75
Greece | 72

Final
20 July – Thessaloniki
Australia | 126
Lithuania | 92
Third place
20 July – Thessaloniki
Croatia | 64
Greece | 73

=== Semifinals ===
19 July 2003
19:00

Boxscore

| Australia | 97–84 | Croatia |
Scoring by quarter: 22–19, 27–16, 26–18, 22–31
| Pts: Bogut 39; Rebs: Bogut 25; Asts: Knight 4 | | Pts: Ukić 16; Rebs: Pašalić 14; Asts: Ukić 7 |

Thessaloniki

19 July 2003
21:15

Boxscore

| Lithuania | 75–72 | Greece |
Scoring by quarter: 12–16, 20–26, 18–17, 25–13
| Pts: Kleiza 27; Rebs: Kleiza 13; Asts: Jomantas 4 | | Pts: Perperoglou 24; Rebs: Schortsanitis 10; Asts: Schortsanitis 4 |

Thessaloniki

=== 3rd place ===
20 July 2003
19:00

Boxscore

| Croatia | 64–73 | Greece |
Scoring by quarter: 20–22, 22–21, 14–19, 8–11
| Pts: Ukić 21; Rebs: Markota, Pašalić 6 Asts: Ukić 7 | | Pts: Vougioukas 20; Rebs: Vougioukas 11; Asts: Vasilopoulos 5 |

Thessaloniki

=== Final ===
20 July 2003
21:15

Boxscore

| Australia | 126–92 | Lithuania |
Scoring by quarter: 35–25, 36–25, 29–24, 26–18
| Pts: Bogut 35; Rebs: Bogut 14; Asts: three players 4 | | Pts: Kleiza 26; Rebs: four players 5 Asts: Pečiukaitis, Babrauskas 3 |

Thessaloniki

== Final standings ==
| Rank | Team | Record |
|---|---|---|
| 1st place, gold medalist(s) | Australia | 7–1 |
| 2nd place, silver medalist(s) | Lithuania | 5–3 |
| 3rd place, bronze medalist(s) | Greece | 6–2 |
| 4th | Croatia | 5–3 |
| 5th | United States | 7–1 |
| 6th | Puerto Rico | 3–5 |
| 7th | Slovenia | 3–5 |
| 8th | Turkey | 4–4 |
| 9th | Venezuela | 6–2 |
| 10th | Argentina | 5–3 |
| 11th | Nigeria | 4–4 |
| 12th | South Korea | 2–6 |
| 13th | Angola | 3–5 |
| 14th | China | 2–6 |
| 15th | Malaysia | 1–7 |
| 16th | Iran | 1–7 |

== Statistical leaders ==
Points

| Name | PPG |
|---|---|
| (Lithuania) Linas Kleiza | 29.1 |
| (Puerto Rico) J. J. Barea | 27.0 |
| (Australia) Andrew Bogut | 26.3 |
| (Angola) Mílton Barros | 22.1 |
| (Croatia) Roko Ukić | 19.8 |

Rebounds

| Name | RPG |
|---|---|
| (Australia) Andrew Bogut | 17.0 |
| (Croatia) Drago Pašalić | 13.2 |
| (Puerto Rico) Peter John Ramos | 11.5 |
| (China) Yi Jianlian | 11.5 |
| (Venezuela) Miguel Marriaga | 10.9 |

Assists

| Name | APG |
|---|---|
| (Puerto Rico) J. J. Barea | 5.3 |
| (South Korea) Tae-Sool Kim | 5.0 |
| (United States) Deron Williams | 5.0 |
| (Slovenia) Jure Močnik | 4.9 |
| (Croatia) Roko Ukić | 4.7 |

Blocks

| Name | BPG |
|---|---|
| (Iran) Jaber Rouzbahani | 4.9 |
| (Venezuela) Miguel Marriaga | 3.4 |
| (Nigeria) Olatunji Muyiwa Soroye | 2.5 |
| (Puerto Rico) Peter John Ramos | 2.2 |
| (Lithuania) Darius Šilinskis | 2.1 |

Steals

| Name | SPG |
|---|---|
| (Greece) Vassilis Xanthopoulos | 3.1 |
| (Argentina) Juan Pablo Figueroa | 2.8 |
| (Iran) Amir Amini | 2.6 |
| (Croatia) Roko Ukić | 2.6 |
| (Nigeria) Abubakar Usman | 2.6 |

Player Game Highs

| Name | Points |
|---|---|
| (United States) Dee Brown | 47 |
| (Lithuania) Linas Kleiza | 42 |
| (Turkey) Engin Atsür | 41 |
| (Australia) Andrew Bogut | 39 |
| (Turkey) Engin Atsür | 37 |

== Awards ==
2003 FIBA Under-19 World Championship

Australia
First title

Most Valuable Player
(Australia) Andrew Bogut
