= Lithuania national basketball team at 2008 Olympic Games =

Winning the third place game at Eurobasket 2007 against Greece allowed Lithuania to qualify for the Olympic basketball tournament at Beijing 2008 without competition at 2008 Pre-Olympics Tournament. The Lithuanian men's basketball team came in fourth place after being beaten by Argentina's basketball team, 87-75.

== 2008 Olympic tournament roster ==
Lithuanian basketball team started its preparation for the Olympics at the end of June, 2008. After couple of training camps and preolympic friendly matches the national team was selected.

Lithuania National Basketball Team 2008 roster
Players
Coaches

Pos.	No.	Name	Age – Date of birth	Height	Club	Ctr.
PG	4	(Lithuania)	Rimantas Kaukėnas	6 ft 4 in (1.93 m)	200 lb (91 kg)		Montepaschi Siena
SG	5	(Lithuania)	Mindaugas Lukauskis	6 ft 6 in (1.98 m)	210 lb (95 kg)		BC Lietuvos Rytas
SF	6	(Lithuania)	Jonas Mačiulis	6 ft 7 in (2.01 m)	216 lb (98 kg)		BC Žalgiris
C	7	(Lithuania)	Darjuš Lavrinovič	6 ft 11 in (2.11 m)	250 lb (113 kg)		UNICS Kazan
G/F	8	(Lithuania)	Ramūnas Šiškauskas (C)	6 ft 6 in (1.98 m)	210 lb (95 kg)		PBC CSKA Moscow
G	9	(Lithuania)	Marius Prekevičius	6 ft 5 in (1.96 m)	210 lb (95 kg)		BC Siauliai
G/F	10	(Lithuania)	Simas Jasaitis	6 ft 8 in (2.03 m)	225 lb (102 kg)		Tau Ceramica
F	11	(Lithuania)	Linas Kleiza	6 ft 8 in (2.03 m)	245 lb (111 kg)		Denver Nuggets
F/C	12	(Lithuania)	Kšyštof Lavrinovič	6 ft 11 in (2.11 m)	250 lb (113 kg)		Montepaschi Siena
PG	13	(Lithuania)	Šarūnas Jasikevičius	6 ft 4 in (1.93 m)	205 lb (93 kg)		Panathinaikos BC
F/C	14	(Lithuania)	Marijonas Petravičius	6 ft 9 in (2.06 m)	235 lb (107 kg)		BC Lietuvos Rytas
C	15	(Lithuania)	Robertas Javtokas	6 ft 11 in (2.11 m)	250 lb (113 kg)		MBC Dynamo Moscow

Head coach

- (Lithuania) Ramūnas Butautas

Assistant coach(es)

- (Lithuania) Rimas Kurtinaitis
- (Lithuania) Robertas Kuncaitis
- (Lithuania) Virginijus Mikalauskas

Legend

- (C) Team captain
- Club field describes last pro club before the tournament

Candidates that didn't make for the final team:

#	Position	Player	Year of birth	Last season's club before the tournament	Notes
	Forward	Darius Songaila	1978	(United States) NBA Washington Wizards	Couldn't play because of back injury announced 2008-07-31
	Guard	Tomas Delininkaitis	1982	(Ukraine) Mariupol Azovmash	Released from the team after tour in Spain and 2008-07-25 game against Argentina
Reserve Team. Reserve team candidates were disjuncted from the main team after 2008-07-11 game against Belarus
	Guard	Rolandas Alijevas	1985	(Russia) CSK VVS Samara	
	Guard	Mantas Kalnietis	1986	(Lithuania) Žalgiris Kaunas	
	Forward/Center	Antanas Kavaliauskas	1982	(Greece) Panionios BC	
	Center	Michailas Anisimovas	1984	(Lithuania) Lietuvos rytas	
	Forward	Donatas Zavackas	1980	(Lithuania) Šiauliai	
	Forward	Justas Sinica	1985	(Lithuania) Sakalai	
	Guard	Martynas Pocius	1986	(United States) NCAA Duke Blue Devils	
	Guard	Steponas Babrauskas	1984	(Italy) Legea Svafati	Added to the list after Jomantas and Seibutis injuries.
	Guard	Artūras Milaknis	1986	(Lithuania) Žalgiris Kaunas	Added to the list after Jomantas and Seibutis injuries.
Other candidates that didn't make to the training camp
	Forward	Paulius Jankūnas	1984	(Lithuania) Žalgiris Kaunas	Couldn't play because of health reasons;
	Center	Žydrūnas Ilgauskas	1975	(United States) NBA Cleveland Cavaliers	On 2008-06-12 Cavaliers declined to give their permission to Z. Ilgauskas to play for the team.
	Forward	Artūras Jomantas	1985	(Lithuania) Lietuvos rytas	Couldn't play because of the rehabilitation after shoulder surgery.
	Guard	Arvydas Macijauskas	1980	(Greece) Olympiacos	Couldn't play because of the back injury.
	Guard	Renaldas Seibutis	1982	(Greece) Olympiacos	Couldn't play because of the injury.

== Preparation matches ==
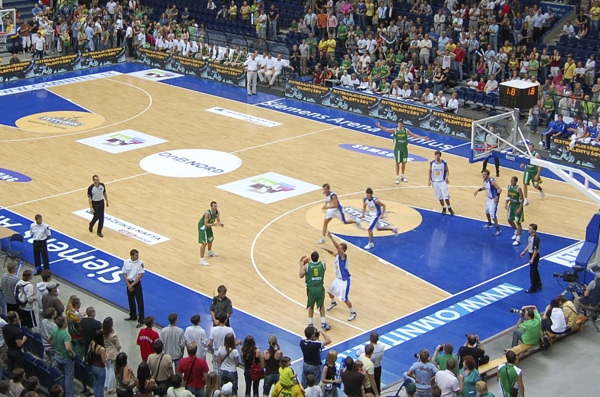
Lithuania vs Iceland in Vilnius (2008-07-15).

July 11, 2008
18:30

Lithuania	113–57	Belarus
Scoring by quarter: 23-23, 38-12, 25-9, 27-13

Šiaulių arena, Šiauliai

July 13, 2008
18:30

Lithuania	115–62	Iceland
Scoring by quarter: 30-19, 31-16, 22-8, 32-19

Kaunas Sports Hall, Kaunas

July 15, 2008
18:30

Lithuania	105–67	Iceland
Scoring by quarter: 26-18, 19-15, 28-17, 32-17

Siemens Arena, Vilnius

July 21, 2008
20:30

Lithuania	90–61	Portugal
Scoring by quarter: 19-8, 21-23, 22-21, 28-9

El Palacio de los Deportes de Riazor, La Coruña, Spain

July 24, 2008
20:00

Lithuania	66–91	Spain
Scoring by quarter: 20-22, 22-29, 13-20, 11-20

Pazo dos Deportes Paco Paz, Ourense, Spain

July 25, 2008
20:00

Lithuania	94–75	Argentina
Scoring by quarter: 33-14, 23-12, 17-21, 21-28

Pazo dos Deportes Paco Paz, Ourense, Spain

July 27, 2008
18:30

Lithuania	90–62	Finland
Scoring by quarter: 17-15, 11-17, 37-6, 25-22

Siemens Arena, Vilnius

August 1, 2008
20:00

Lithuania	84–120	United States
Scoring by quarter: 15-31, 24-25, 27-35, 18-29

Coati Strip Coati Arena, Venetian Macao Resort Hotel, Macao, China

August 2, 2008
20:00

Lithuania	82–74	Turkey
Scoring by quarter: 18-15, 23-18, 22-18, 19-23

Coati Strip Coati Arena, Venetian Macao Resort Hotel, Macao, China

== Olympic games ==
Group Stage

August 10, 2008
16:45

Lithuania	79–75	Argentina
Scoring by quarter: 14-11, 20-19, 17-15, 28-30

Wukesong Indoor Stadium, Beijing

August 12, 2008
09:00

Lithuania	99–67	Iran
Scoring by quarter: 15-20, 31-14, 28-19, 25-14

Wukesong Indoor Stadium, Beijing

August 14, 2008
16:45

Lithuania	86–79	Russia
Scoring by quarter: 23-24, 21-17, 25-21, 17-17

Wukesong Indoor Stadium, Beijing

August 16, 2008
14:30

Lithuania	86–73	Croatia
Scoring by quarter: 13-15, 29-30, 16-17, 28-11

Wukesong Indoor Stadium, Beijing

August 18, 2008
11:15

Lithuania	75–106	Australia
Scoring by quarter: 14-28, 15-27, 22-20, 24-31

Wukesong Indoor Stadium, Beijing

Quarterfinal

August 20, 2008
16:45

Lithuania	94–68	China
Scoring by quarter: 19-17, 22-13, 29-23, 24-15

Wukesong Indoor Stadium, Beijing

Semifinal

August 22, 2008
20:00

Lithuania	86–91	Spain
Scoring by quarter: 19-21, 23-19, 24-22, 20-29

Wukesong Indoor Stadium, Beijing

Bronze medal game

August 24, 2008
12:00

Lithuania	75–87	Argentina
Scoring by quarter: 21-24, 13-22, 15-22, 26-19

Wukesong Indoor Stadium, Beijing
