= Rajiv Gandhi Stadium =

Rajiv Gandhi Stadium may refer to:

- Rajiv Gandhi Indoor Stadium, an indoor stadium in Ernakulam, Kerala, India
- Rajiv Gandhi International Cricket Stadium, Dehradun, a cricket stadium in Dehradun, Uttarakhand, India
- Rajiv Gandhi International Cricket Stadium, a cricket stadium in Hyderabad, Telangana, India
- Rajiv Gandhi International Indoor Stadium, Kottayam, an indoor stadium in Kottayam, Kerala, India
- Rajiv Gandhi Sports Complex, a multipurpose sports stadium in Rohtak, Haryana
- Rajiv Gandhi Stadium (Aizawl), a football stadium in Aizawl, Mizoram, India
