= 2004 FIBA Asia Under-18 Championship =

Asian youth basketball championship

2004 FIBA U18 Asia Cup
18th FIBA Under-18 Asian Basketball Championship

Tournament details
- Host country: India
- Dates: 14–23 September
- Teams: 16 (from 44 federations)
- Venues: 2 (in 1 host city)

Final positions
- Champions: Iran (1st title)

Tournament statistics
- MVP: (Iran) Jaber Rouzbahani

The FIBA Asia Under-18 Championship 2004 is the 2004 edition of the FIBA Asia's youth championship for basketball. The games were held at Bangalore, India from 14 to 23 September 2004.

== Draw ==
Group A	Group B	Group C	Group D
China; Kazakhstan; Saudi Arabia; Singapore	Iran; Kyrgyzstan; Japan; Chinese Taipei	South Korea; Philippines; Kuwait; Lebanon	Qatar; Hong Kong; Yemen; India

== Preliminary round ==
=== Group A ===
Team	Pld	W	L	PF	PA	PD	Pts
China	3	3	0	257	178	+79	6
Kazakhstan	3	2	1	237	177	+60	5
Saudi Arabia	3	1	2	192	221	−29	4
Singapore	3	0	3	134	244	−110	3

14 September
9:00

Singapore	34–78	Kazakhstan
Scoring by quarter: 12–22, 6–23, 10–18, 6–15

Rajiv Gandhi Sports Complex, Bangalore

14 September
13:00

Saudi Arabia	56–84	China
Scoring by quarter: 13–26, 18–18, 10–17, 15–23

Rajiv Gandhi Sports Complex, Bangalore

15 September
11:00

China	84–74	Kazakhstan
Scoring by quarter: 21–12, 16–17, 23–25, 24–20

Rajiv Gandhi Sports Complex, Bangalore

15 September
13:00

Saudi Arabia	77–52	Singapore
Scoring by quarter: 24–12, 22–16, 13–13, 18–11

Rajiv Gandhi Sports Complex, Bangalore

17 September
9:00

China	89–48	Singapore
Scoring by quarter: 30–12, 21–16, 21–12, 17–8

Rajiv Gandhi Sports Complex, Bangalore

17 September
19:00

Kazakhstan	85–59	Saudi Arabia
Scoring by quarter: 23–16, 21–11, 18–17, 23–15

Rajiv Gandhi Sports Complex, Bangalore

=== Group B ===
Team	Pld	W	L	PF	PA	PD	Pts
Iran	3	3	0	258	174	+84	6
Chinese Taipei	3	2	1	264	233	+31	5
Japan	3	1	2	220	249	−29	4
Kyrgyzstan	3	0	3	217	303	−86	3

14 September
11:00

Japan	50–84	Iran
Scoring by quarter: 18–18, 4–17, 12–23, 16–26

Rajiv Gandhi Sports Complex, Bangalore

14 September
20:30

Chinese Taipei	116–76	Kyrgyzstan
Scoring by quarter: 30–12, 22–22, 37–22, 27–20

Rajiv Gandhi Sports Complex, Bangalore

16 September
9:00

Iran	98–68	Kyrgyzstan
Scoring by quarter: 19–9, 28–14, 27–19, 24–26

Rajiv Gandhi Sports Complex, Bangalore

16 September
19:00

Japan	81–92	Chinese Taipei
Scoring by quarter: 17–26, 22–18, 21–22, 21–26

Rajiv Gandhi Sports Complex, Bangalore

17 September
13:00

Kyrgyzstan	73–89	Japan
Scoring by quarter: 21–25, 16–14, 17–20, 19–30

Rajiv Gandhi Sports Complex, Bangalore

17 September
15:00

Iran	76–56	Chinese Taipei
Scoring by quarter: 24–20, 18–16, 27–14, 7–6

Rajiv Gandhi Sports Complex, Bangalore

=== Group C ===
Team	Pld	W	L	PF	PA	PD	Pts
Lebanon	3	3	0	274	223	+51	6
South Korea	3	2	1	331	236	+95	5
Philippines	3	1	2	243	280	−37	4
Kuwait	3	0	3	207	316	−109	3

15 September
17:00

Lebanon	83–63	Philippines
Scoring by quarter: 20–16, 21–12, 23–23, 19–12

Rajiv Gandhi Sports Complex, Bangalore

15 September
19:00

Kuwait	62–119	South Korea
Scoring by quarter: 19–18, 21–33, 8–38, 14–30

Rajiv Gandhi Sports Complex, Bangalore

16 September
11:00

South Korea	121–80	Philippines
Scoring by quarter: 46–22, 35–19, 22–18, 18–21

Rajiv Gandhi Sports Complex, Bangalore

16 September
17:00

Kuwait	69–97	Lebanon
Scoring by quarter: 26–20, 14–27, 21–27, 8–23

Rajiv Gandhi Sports Complex, Bangalore

17 September
11:00

Philippines	100–76	Kuwait
Scoring by quarter: 21–21, 22–15, 27–22, 30–18

Rajiv Gandhi Sports Complex, Bangalore

17 September
17:00

South Korea	91–94	Lebanon
Scoring by quarter: 20–27, 22–23, 33–24, 16–20

Rajiv Gandhi Sports Complex, Bangalore

=== Group D ===
Team	Pld	W	L	PF	PA	PD	Pts
India	3	3	0	211	162	+49	6
Hong Kong	3	2	1	224	196	+28	5
Yemen	3	1	2	240	192	+48	4
Qatar	3	0	3	143	265	−125	3

14 September
15:00

Yemen	99–46	Qatar
Scoring by quarter: 24–14, 31–15, 23–8, 21–9

Rajiv Gandhi Sports Complex, Bangalore

14 September
18:30

India	69–51	Hong Kong
Scoring by quarter: 15–12, 21–5, 21–16, 12–18

Rajiv Gandhi Sports Complex, Bangalore

15 September
9:00

Qatar	51–94	Hong Kong
Scoring by quarter: 12–19, 17–20, 14–29, 8–26

Rajiv Gandhi Sports Complex, Bangalore

15 September
15:00

Yemen	65–67	India
Scoring by quarter: 19–16, 16–18, 17–18, 13–15

Rajiv Gandhi Sports Complex, Bangalore

16 September
13:00

Hong Kong	79–76	Yemen
Scoring by quarter: 22–10, 17–19, 20–18, 20–29

Rajiv Gandhi Sports Complex, Bangalore

16 September
15:00

Qatar	46–75	India
Scoring by quarter: 10–21, 12–24, 13–17, 11–13

Rajiv Gandhi Sports Complex, Bangalore

== Quarterfinal round ==
=== Group I ===
Team	Pld	W	L	PF	PA	PD	Pts
China	3	3	0	255	195	+60	6
Lebanon	3	2	1	269	232	+37	5
Chinese Taipei	3	1	2	292	273	+19	4
Hong Kong	3	0	3	198	314	−116	3

18 September
15:00

China	93–47	Hong Kong
Scoring by quarter: 23–8, 29–18, 18–6, 23–15

Rajiv Gandhi Sports Complex, Bangalore

18 September
19:00

Chinese Taipei	91–101	Lebanon
Scoring by quarter: 21–39, 23–19, 23–18, 24–25

Rajiv Gandhi Sports Complex, Bangalore

19 September
17:00

Lebanon	61–71	China
Scoring by quarter: 13–27, 15–19, 17–15, 16–10

Rajiv Gandhi Sports Complex, Bangalore

19 September
19:00

Hong Kong	81–114	Chinese Taipei
Scoring by quarter: 22–20, 22–31, 19–30, 18–33

Rajiv Gandhi Sports Complex, Bangalore

20 September
19:00

China	91–87 (OT)	Chinese Taipei
Scoring by quarter: 27–32, 19–16, 16–14, 18–18, Overtime: 11–7

Rajiv Gandhi Sports Complex, Bangalore

21 September
19:00

Lebanon	107–70	Hong Kong
Scoring by quarter: 19–20, 30–18, 34–15, 24–17

Rajiv Gandhi Sports Complex, Bangalore

=== Group II ===
Team	Pld	W	L	PF	PA	PD	Pts
Iran	3	3	0	242	171	+71	6
South Korea	3	2	1	261	253	+8	5
Kazakhstan	3	1	2	229	235	−6	4
India	3	0	3	200	273	−73	3

18 September
17:00

Kazakhstan	85–72	India
Scoring by quarter: 22–20, 25–12, 17–18, 21–22

Rajiv Gandhi Sports Complex, Bangalore

19 September
15:00

Iran	84–68	South Korea
Scoring by quarter: 26–14, 18–22, 17–17, 23–15

Rajiv Gandhi Sports Complex, Bangalore

20 September
15:00

South Korea	91–86	Kazakhstan
Scoring by quarter: 23–29, 30–17, 16–22, 22–18

Rajiv Gandhi Sports Complex, Bangalore

20 September
17:00

India	45–86	Iran
Scoring by quarter: 12–17, 17–20, 9–29, 7–20

Rajiv Gandhi Sports Complex, Bangalore

21 September
15:00

Kazakhstan	58–72	Iran
Scoring by quarter: 11–24, 17–20, 14–14, 16–14

Rajiv Gandhi Sports Complex, Bangalore

21 September
17:00

South Korea	102–83	India
Scoring by quarter: 23–17, 27–16, 37–24, 15–26

Rajiv Gandhi Sports Complex, Bangalore

=== Group III ===
Team	Pld	W	L	PF	PA	PD	Pts
Saudi Arabia	3	3	0	217	161	+56	6
Kyrgyzstan	3	2	1	206	166	+40	5
Philippines	3	1	2	206	192	+14	4
Qatar	3	0	3	118	228	−110	3

18 September
9:00

Saudi Arabia	81–36	Qatar
Scoring by quarter: 18–7, 23–21, 25–8, 15–0

Rajiv Gandhi Sports Complex, Bangalore

18 September
11:00

Kyrgyzstan	79–61	Philippines
Scoring by quarter: 16–25, 20–7, 19–17, 24–12

Rajiv Gandhi Sports Complex, Bangalore

19 September
11:00

Philippines	71–73	Saudi Arabia
Scoring by quarter: 23–20, 12–20, 19–17, 17–16

Rajiv Gandhi Sports Complex, Bangalore

19 September
13:00

Qatar	42–73	Kyrgyzstan
Scoring by quarter: 5–14, 15–18, 10–23, 12–18

Rajiv Gandhi Sports Complex, Bangalore

20 September
13:00

Saudi Arabia	63–54	Kyrgyzstan
Scoring by quarter: 11–14, 14–20, 17–7, 21–13

Rajiv Gandhi Sports Complex, Bangalore

21 September
9:00

Philippines	74–40	Qatar
Scoring by quarter: 18–7, 17–14, 21–11, 18–8

Rajiv Gandhi Sports Complex, Bangalore

=== Group IV ===
Team	Pld	W	L	PF	PA	PD	Pts
Japan	3	3	0	257	204	+53	6
Kuwait	3	2	1	268	246	+22	5
Yemen	3	1	2	231	211	+20	4
Singapore	3	0	3	177	272	−95	3

18 September
13:00

Singapore	38–84	Yemen
Scoring by quarter: 6–19, 5–26, 12–25, 15–14

Rajiv Gandhi Sports Complex, Bangalore

19 September
9:00

Japan	89–75	Kuwait
Scoring by quarter: 19–17, 18–17, 26–25, 26–16

Rajiv Gandhi Sports Complex, Bangalore

20 September
9:00

Kuwait	95–81	Singapore
Scoring by quarter: 23–21, 19–16, 32–29, 21–15

Rajiv Gandhi Sports Complex, Bangalore

20 September
11:00

Yemen	71–75	Japan
Scoring by quarter: 26–17, 15–17, 12–19, 18–22

Rajiv Gandhi Sports Complex, Bangalore

21 September
11:00

Singapore	58–93	Japan
Scoring by quarter: 10–32, 19–25, 14–20, 15–16

Rajiv Gandhi Sports Complex, Bangalore

21 September
13:00

Kuwait	98–76	Yemen
Scoring by quarter: 28–22, 24–21, 17–20, 29–13

Rajiv Gandhi Sports Complex, Bangalore

== Classification 9th–16th ==
=== 15th place ===
22 September
9:00

Qatar	60–80	Singapore
Scoring by quarter: 18–17, 14–14, 14–25, 14–24

Kanteerava Indoor Stadium, Bangalore

=== 13th place ===
22 September
11:00

Philippines	81–70	Yemen
Scoring by quarter: 18–19, 28–14, 14–13, 21–24

Kanteerava Indoor Stadium, Bangalore

=== 11th place ===
23 September
9:00

Kyrgyzstan	100–89	Kuwait
Scoring by quarter: 14–21, 26–26, 33–21, 27–21

Kanteerava Indoor Stadium, Bangalore

=== 9th place ===
23 September
11:00

Saudi Arabia	60–76	Japan
Scoring by quarter: 14–17, 19–19, 12–20, 15–20

Kanteerava Indoor Stadium, Bangalore

== Classification 5th–8th ==
Semifinals
September 22
Chinese Taipei	82
India	74
September 22
Kazakhstan	0
Hong Kong	20

5th place
September 23
Chinese Taipei	100
Hong Kong	82
7th place
September 22
India	20
Kazakhstan	0

=== Semifinals ===
22 September
13:00

Kazakhstan	0–20	Hong Kong
Walkover

Kanteerava Indoor Stadium, Bangalore

22 September
15:00

Chinese Taipei	82–74	India
Scoring by quarter: 16–14, 22–14, 24–23, 20–23

Kanteerava Indoor Stadium, Bangalore

=== 7th place ===
23 September
13:00

India	20–0	Kazakhstan
Walkover

Kanteerava Indoor Stadium, Bangalore

=== 5th place ===
23 September
15:00

Chinese Taipei	100–82	Hong Kong
Scoring by quarter: 29–18, 29–21, 19–23, 23–20

Kanteerava Indoor Stadium, Bangalore

== Final round ==
Semifinals
September 22
China	67
South Korea	72
September 22
Iran	78
Lebanon	37

Final
September 23
South Korea	86
Iran	89
3rd place
September 23
China	73
Lebanon	63

=== Semifinals ===
22 September
17:00

China	67–72	South Korea
Scoring by quarter: 18–20, 18–18, 19–14, 12–20
Pts: Wang Y. 24		Pts: Song S.I. 22

Kanteerava Indoor Stadium, Bangalore

22 September
19:00

Iran	78–37	Lebanon
Scoring by quarter: 22–4, 26–11, 16–11, 14–11
Pts: Rouzbahani 17		Pts: Saad 12

Kanteerava Indoor Stadium, Bangalore

=== 3rd place ===
23 September
17:00

China	73–63	Lebanon
Scoring by quarter: 16–16, 17–12, 19–19, 21–16
Pts: Wang Y. 23		Pts: Stephan 25

Kanteerava Indoor Stadium, Bangalore

=== Final ===
23 September
19:00

South Korea	86–89	Iran
Scoring by quarter: 13–29, 28–28, 12–12, 33–20
Pts: Kim J.S. 19		Pts: Rouzbahani 27

Kanteerava Indoor Stadium, Bangalore

== Final standing ==
Rank	Team	Record
1st place, gold medalist(s)	Iran	8–0
2nd place, silver medalist(s)	South Korea	5–3
3rd place, bronze medalist(s)	China	7–1
4	Lebanon	5–3
5	Chinese Taipei	5–3
6	Hong Kong	3–5
7	India	4–4
8	Kazakhstan	3–5
9	Japan	5–2
10	Saudi Arabia	4–3
11	Kyrgyzstan	3–4
12	Kuwait	2–5
13	Philippines	3–4
14	Yemen	2–5
15	Singapore	1–6
16	Qatar	0–7

== Awards ==
2004 Asian Under-18 champions

Iran
First title
