= Rouzbahani =

Rouzbahani is a surname. Notable people with the surname include:

- Ehsan Rouzbahani, Iranian boxer
- Jaber Rouzbahani (born 1986), Iranian professional basketball player
