= Rhys Carter =

Australian basketball player (born 1984)

Melbourne United
- Title: Assistant coach
- League: NBL

Personal information
- Born: 14 March 1984 (age 42) Sale, Victoria, Australia
- Listed height: 190 cm (6 ft 3 in)
- Listed weight: 85 kg (187 lb)

Career information
- Playing career: 2000–2019
- Position: Point guard
- Coaching career: 2019–present

Career history

Playing
- 2000–2002: Australian Institute of Sport
- 2002–2004: Victoria Giants
- 2003: Geelong Supercats
- 2004: Latrobe City Energy
- 2005: Frankston Blues
- 2005–2008: West Sydney Razorbacks
- 2006: Mildura Mavericks
- 2008: Latrobe City Energy
- 2008–2009: South Dragons
- 2009: Latrobe City Energy
- 2009–2010: Gothia Basket
- 2010–2011: Adelaide 36ers
- 2011: North Adelaide Rockets
- 2011–2013: Uppsala Basket
- 2013: Perth Wildcats
- 2013: Knox Raiders
- 2013–2014: Eco Örebro
- 2014: Adelaide 36ers
- 2014: Knox Raiders
- 2014–2015: New Zealand Breakers
- 2015–2016: Sydney Kings
- 2016: Melbourne Tigers
- 2016–2017: Plymouth Raiders
- 2017–2018: Uppsala Basket
- 2018: Frankston Blues
- 2019: Sandringham Sabres

Coaching
- 2019–present: Melbourne United (dc/asst)
- 2022–2024: Sandringham Sabres (asst)

Career highlights
- As player: 2× NBL champion (2009, 2015); As coach: NBL champion (2021)

Rhys Jarred Carter (born 14 March 1984) is an Australian former professional basketball player and current assistant coach for Melbourne United of the National Basketball League (NBL). He had a near 20-year career, playing 282 NBL games (including two championships), over 110 games in Sweden, over 200 SEABL/NBL1 games, and time in the British Basketball League, Big V and Premier League.

== Early life ==
Carter was born in Sale, Victoria.

== Playing career ==
=== AIS (2000–2002) ===
Between 2000 and 2002, Carter played in the South East Australian Basketball League (SEABL) for the Australian Institute of Sport. He helped the AIS win the 2002 SEABL East Conference championship behind his 27 points, six rebounds and six assists in the grand final against the Geelong Supercats, as he earned game MVP.

=== Professional (2002–2018) ===
Carter began his professional career in 2002 with the Victoria Giants in the NBL, where he spent two seasons. After not playing in 2004–05, he returned to the NBL for the 2005–06 season and played three seasons with the West Sydney Razorbacks. For the 2008–09 season, he played for the championship-winning South Dragons.

For the 2009–10 season, Carter played overseas for the first time with Swedish team Gothia Basket. After returning to Australia for the 2010–11 season to play for the Adelaide 36ers, Carter returned to Sweden for the 2011–12 season to play for Uppsala Basket. He then played half of the 2012–13 season with Uppsala, before returning to Australia in January 2013 to play out the season with the Perth Wildcats. In February 2013, he played his 200th NBL game. He then split the 2013–14 season with Sweden's Eco Örebro and the Adelaide 36ers.

For the 2014–15 season, Carter played for the championship-winning New Zealand Breakers. His final season in the NBL came in 2015–16 with the Sydney Kings.

For the 2016–17 season, Carter played in England for the first time with the Plymouth Raiders of the British Basketball League. His final professional season then came in 2017–18 with Uppsala Basket in Sweden.

=== Australian state leagues (2003–2019) ===
Between 2003 and 2019, Carter played 10 seasons across various Australian state leagues. His first stint came in 2003 with the Geelong Supercats in the SEABL. He then played for the Latrobe City Energy (Big V, 2004); Frankston Blues (SEABL, 2005); Mildura Mavericks (SEABL, 2006); Latrobe City Energy (Big V, 2008–09); North Adelaide Rockets (Premier League, 2011); Knox Raiders (SEABL, 2013–14); Melbourne Tigers (SEABL, 2016); Frankston Blues (SEABL, 2018); and Sandringham Sabres (NBL1, 2019).

In July 2019, Carter announced his retirement from basketball.

=== National team ===
In 2003, Carter was a member of Australia's gold medal-winning team at the FIBA Under-19 World Championship in Greece. Two years later, he represented Australia at the FIBA Under-21 World Championship in Argentina. In 2009, Carter represented the Australian Boomers for the first time, travelling with the team on a tour to China.

== Coaching career ==
Carter was hoping for a back-up point guard spot with Melbourne United for the 2018–19 season, but when that didn't eventuate the team offered him a role as both team manager and shadow coach. For the 2019–20 season, he was promoted to head coach of the club's academy program and as a development coach for the NBL side. He was promoted to assistant coach for the 2020–21 season. He continued on with United as an assistant coach in the 2021–22 season. He joined the Sandringham Sabres men's team as an assistant coach for the 2022 NBL1 South season. He continued with United in 2022–23 and then returned to Sandringham as an assistant in 2023. He continued with United in 2023–24. He spent a third season with Sandringham in 2024.

In 2025, Carter served as an assistant coach for the Australian Crocs during their gold medal-winning U16 Asia Cup campaign. He returned to United as an assistant coach for the 2025–26 season. On 12 February 2026, Carter served as acting head coach for Melbourne United against the Cairns Taipans in the absence of Dean Vickerman. He led the team for a second time on 15 February against the Illawarra Hawks.

Carter served as assistant coach of the Australia men's national under-17 basketball team at the 2026 FIBA Under-17 Basketball World Cup.
