= Darius Šilinskis =

Lithuanian basketball player

Personal information
- Born: May 18, 1984 (age 42)
Medal record
Men's basketball
Representing Lithuania
FIBA Under-21 World Championship
Gold medal – first place	2005 Argentina	National Team
FIBA Europe Under-20 Championship
Bronze medal – third place	2004 Czech Republic	National Team
FIBA Under-19 World Championship
Silver medal – second place	2003 Greece	National Team

Darius Šilinskis (born May 18, 1984, in Mažeikiai, Lithuania) is a former professional Lithuanian basketball center, who last played for NKL's JAZZ-Diremta. He is 2.16 m tall and weights 118 kg. In his early professional career he had couple stints with Žalgiris Kaunas.

== Achievements ==
- LKL Champion - 2003, 2007
- LKF Cup Winner - 2007
