= Kevin Palacios =

Colombian footballer (born 1995)

Personal information
- Full name: Kevin Alexánder Palacios Salazar
- Date of birth: 31 January 2000 (age 26)
- Place of birth: Quibdó, Chocó Department, Colombia
- Height: 1.74 m (5 ft 9 in)
- Position: Winger

Team information
- Current team: Santos Laguna
- Number: 77

Youth career
- Fortaleza

Senior career*
Years	Team	Apps	(Gls)
2019–2025	Fortaleza	30	(2)
2021	→ Atlético Huila (loan)	15	(1)
2021–2022	→ Cortuluá (loan)	27	(0)
2023	→ Deportivo Pereira (loan)	9	(0)
2023–2024	→ Al-Sailiya (loan)	11	(1)
2024–2025	→ Millonarios (loan)	28	(7)
2025–	Santos Laguna	29	(3)
- * Club domestic league appearances and goals as of 21:51, 21 September 2026 (UTC)

Kevin Alexánder Palacios Salazar (born 31 January 2000) is a Colombian footballer who plays as a winger for Liga MX club Santos Laguna.

== Career ==
After playing for the Fortaleza youth team, he made his debut for the first team on 10 April 2019 in a Copa Colombia game against Tigres. He signed his first professional contract in January 2020 and became a regular starter in the first team under manager Pablo Garabello. He scored his first professional goal on 15 February 2021 in the 16th minute of a Categoría Primera B game against Barranquilla.

In July 2021, he signed for Categoría Primera A club Atlético Huila, his first spell in the domestic top division. The club was eventually relegated and Palacios played under 3 managers in 6 months, scoring 1 goal in 15 matches.

In January 2022, he joined Cortuluá on loan for a year, where his club was again eventually relegated.

He embarked on another loan in January 2023, staying in the top division to sign for Deportivo Pereira for 6 months. He got his first experience of continental football with the club, eventually reaching the quarter-finals of the Copa Libertadores. His continental debut came in a match against Colo-Colo as he came on as a 68th-minute substitute for Arley Rodríguez.

In August 2023, he moved abroad for the first time, joining Qatari Second Division club Al-Sailiya.

In July 2024, he joined Millonarios on loan after returning to Colombia. He impressed at Millonarios as he scored 7 goals in 29 appearances in all competitions.

On 10 July 2025, Palacios finally left Fortaleza to sign for Liga MX side Santos Laguna permanently.
