= Miguel Marriaga =

Venezuelan basketball player

No. 4 – Brillantes del Zulia
- Position: Center

Personal information
- Born: June 6, 1984 (age 42) Maracaibo, Zulia, Venezuela
- Listed height: 6 ft 9 in (2.06 m)
- Listed weight: 260 lb (118 kg)

Career information
- Playing career: 2004–present

Career history
- 2004: Duros de Lara
- 2004: Gaiteros de Zulia
- 2004: Guácharos de Maturín
- 2005: Gaiteros de Zulia
- 2005: Duros de Lara
- 2005: Pescadores de Cumana
- 2006: Gaiteros de Zulia
- 2006: Duros de Lara
- 2007: Gaiteros de Zulia
- 2007: Duros de Lara
- 2008: Búcaros de Bucaramanga
- 2008: Trotamundos de Carabobo
- 2009: Búcaros de Bucaramanga
- 2010: Trotamundos de Carabobo
- 2010: Búcaros de Bucaramanga
- 2011: Trotamundos de Carabobo
- 2011: Soles de Mexicali
- 2011: Caribbean Heat Islanders de San Andres
- 2012: Marinos de Anzoátegui
- 2012: Búcaros de Bucaramanga
- 2013: Marinos de Anzoátegui
- 2013–2014: Cimarrones del Chocó
- 2014: Toros de Aragua
- 2014: Trotamundos de Carabobo
- 2015–2016: Toros de Aragua
- 2016: Marinos de Anzoátegui
- 2016: Ciclista Olímpico
- 2016–2017: Estudiantes Concordia
- 2017: Toros de Aragua
- 2017: Marinos de Anzoátegui
- 2018–2020: Piratas de La Guaira
- 2021–2022: Trotamundos de Carabobo
- 2023–present: Brillantes del Zulia
Medals
Men's basketball
Representing Venezuela
FIBA South American Championship
Gold medal – first place	2014 Venezuela
Silver medal – second place	2012 Argentina
Bronze medal – third place	2008 Chile
FIBA AmeriCup
Gold medal – first place	2015 Mexico
Bronze medal – third place	2005 Dominican Republic

Miguel Ángel Marriaga Herrera (born June 6, 1984) is a Venezuelan professional basketball player.

== Professional career ==
In his pro career, Marriaga has played in the 2nd-tier South American League.

== National team career ==
Marriaga has represented the senior men's team of Venezuela at various tournaments. He won a gold medal at the 2014 South American Championship, and a gold medal at the 2015 FIBA Americas Championship. He also played at the men's basketball competition at the 2016 Summer Olympics.
