= Jure Močnik =

Slovenian basketball player

Kansai Helios Domžale
- Title: Head coach
- League: Slovenian League

Personal information
- Born: August 23, 1985 (age 41) Ljubljana, SFR Yugoslavia
- Listed height: 1.83 m (6 ft 0 in)
- Listed weight: 78 kg (172 lb)

Career information
- Playing career: 2001–2019
- Position: Point guard
- Coaching career: 2019–present

Career history

Playing
- 2001–2010: Helios Domžale
- 2010–2012: Peristeri
- 2012–2013: Helios Domžale
- 2013–2014: Slovan
- 2014–2015: Portorož
- 2016–2019: Helios Domžale

Coaching
- 2019–2022: Helios Suns (youth)
- 2022–2023: KD Ježica (youth)
- 2020–2024: KD Ježica
- 2024–: Kansai Helios Domžale

Career highlights
- As player: 2× Slovenian Champion (2007, 2016); Slovenian Cup Winner (2007); Alpe Adria Cup (2016); As coach: Slovenian champion U19 (2022); 2. SKL runner-up (2023); 3. SKL promotion (2022)
Medals
Representing Slovenia
FIBA Europe U20 Championship
Gold medal – first place	2004 Czech Republic	U-20 Team
European U-18 Championship
Silver medal – second place	2002 Germany	U-18 Team

Jure Močnik (born August 23, 1985) is a Slovenian former professional basketball player.
