= Engin Atsür =

Turkish basketball player (born 1984)

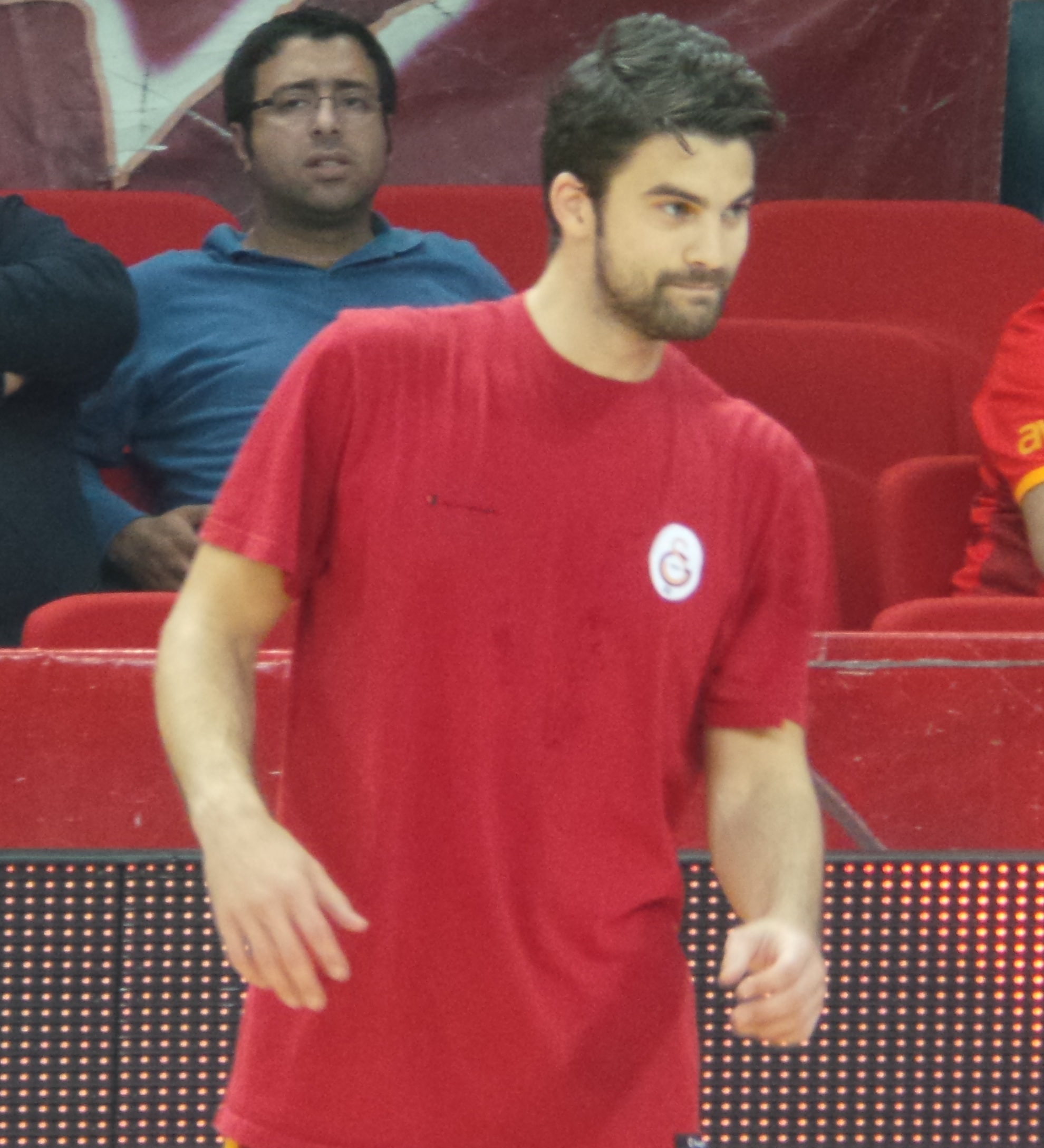
- Atsür with Galatasaray

No. 6 – Orlandina Basket
- Position: Point guard
- League: LBA; Champions League

Personal information
- Born: April 2, 1984 (age 42) Istanbul, Turkey
- Listed height: 6 ft 4 in (1.93 m)
- Listed weight: 190 lb (86 kg)

Career information
- College: NC State (2003–2007)
- NBA draft: 2007: undrafted
- Playing career: 2000–2018

Career history
- 2000–2001: Efes Pilsen
- 2007–2008: Benetton Treviso
- 2008–2009: Efes Pilsen
- 2009–2010: Beşiktaş
- 2010–2012: Fenerbahçe
- 2012–2014: Galatasaray
- 2014–2016: Beşiktaş
- 2016–2017: Alba Berlin
- 2017–2018: Betaland Capo d'Orlando

Career highlights
- 3× Turkish League champion (2009, 2011, 2013); 2x Turkish Cup winner (2009, 2011)
Medals
Men's basketball
Representing Turkey
Mediterranean Games
Bronze medal – third place	2009 Pescara	Team competition

Engin Atsür (born April 2, 1984) is a Turkish professional basketball player for Orlandina Basket of the Lega Basket Serie A (LBA). Standing at 6 ft 4 in (1.93 m), he plays the point guard position. Atsür played college basketball at the North Carolina State University from 2003 to 2007.

He has also German citizenship by his mother.

== Early years ==
Atsür attended Saint-Benoit French High School in Istanbul. He started playing basketball in the youth teams of Efes Pilsen S.K.

After one year in the Turkish Second League, Atsür moved to Raleigh, North Carolina, U.S. to study business administration at NC State on an athletic scholarship and he graduated in 2007. Atsür was the starting point guard for NC State all four years. He was named to the Collegeinsider.com Defensive All-America Team for his junior season.

== Pro career ==
Atsür signed his first professional contract with the Italian League team Benetton Treviso on June 30, 2007. After spending one season in Italy, he signed a contract with the Turkish League team Efes Pilsen. For the 2009–10 season, Atsür signed a contract with Beşiktaş Cola Turka.

After a successful season with Beşiktaş Cola Turka (27 games in TBL with 30.0 min, 13.1 pts, 48.3% FG, 40.8% 3P, 80.2% FT, 3.0 reb, 4.4 ast, 1.4 stl, 2.4 TO), Atsür signed with Fenerbahçe for two years.

On June 29, 2012, he signed a two-year contract with Galatasaray Medical Park. In June 2013, Atsur's Galatasaray won the league championship after defeating Banvit B.K. in the TBL finals.

On June 23, 2014, Atsür returned to his former team Beşiktaş, when he signed a 2-year deal with an option for a third year.

On July 14, 2016, Atsür signed with German club Alba Berlin.

On September 5, 2017, he signed with Italian club Orlandina Basket.

== Turkish national team ==
At the 2002 European Championship for Junior Men at Germany, Atsür averaged 22.3 PPG and he was selected to the All-Tournament First Team as the best shooting guard of the competition.

Atsür was also a member of the senior Turkish national team, and figured in Turkey's squad that finished sixth in the 2006 FIBA World Championship held in Japan.

== Milestones ==
At North Carolina State:

- 33rd player in North Carolina State University history to score over 1,000 points; scored 1181 points in his career.
- 2nd best three-point shooter in school history
- 4th best in minutes played in school history (3,838 min- 119 games- 32,3 mpg)
- Averaged 9.9 PPG over his career
