= Valentin Pastal =

Turkish basketball player (born 1984)

No. 17 – Best Balıkesir
- Position: Small forward
- League: Turkish Basketball League

Personal information
- Born: 9 June 1984 (age 42) Ashgabat, Turkmenistan
- Listed height: 6 ft 9 in (2.06 m)
- Listed weight: 210 lb (95 kg)

Career information
- Playing career: 2002–present

Career history
- 2002–2005: Efes Pilsen
- 2005–2006: Galatasaray Café Crown
- 2006–2007: Beykozspor
- 2007–2010: Pınar Karşıyaka
- 2010–2011: Mersin BB
- 2011–2013: Antalya BB
- 2013–2016: Torku Selçuk Üniversitesi / Torku Konyaspor
- 2016–2017: Best Balıkesir
- 2017–2018: Antalya BB
- 2018–2019: Fethiye Belediyespor

Valentin Pastal (born 9 June 1984) is a Turkish professional basketball player for Best Balıkesir of the Turkish Basketball League (TBL). He has also competed for the Turkey national basketball team, making most of his appearances through 2004 and 2005. Pastal has previously been with Efes Pilsen and Pınar Karşıyaka, 2 of the 7 teams he has represented in the course of his playing career. Although he is generally considered to be a small forward, the Ashgabat native is known for the versatility he headlines. Pastal is often set side by side with NBA player and fellow countryman Hedo Türkoğlu thanks to his multipurpose attributes.

== Professional career ==
=== Efes Pilsen (2002-2005) ===
Pastal began his career with Efes Pilsen— currently known as Anadolu Efes— and was averaging 2.0 points, 0.6 rebounds, and 0.6 assists by the end of the regular season. His impact was greatly magnified as the team made a playoff appearance against Beşiktaş. The forward logged 14 minutes, which was the greatest amount of time he had played in a single game up till then, and scored five points against the strong opposing defense. He helped the team lift their second straight Turkish Basketball League trophy.

In 2004, the team won yet another championship, but Pastal had even less of an influence. He averaged just 1.6 points, 0.7 rebounds, and 0.3 assists at the conclusion of the Efes Pilsen's third straight triumph.

Efes Pilsen won their fourth consecutive title in 2005, as Valentin Pastal finished his final year with the team. On average, Pastal scored 2.3 points, grabbed 1.6 rebounds, and recorded 0.8 assists. He participated in just 1 postseason contest but was allowed 23 minutes of playing time earlier in the regular season against Galatasaray Café Crown.
