= Wang Lei (basketball) =

Chinese basketball player

Wang Lei 王磊
Personal information
- Born: August 12, 1986 (age 40) Jiaozuo, Henan, China
- Listed height: 6.8 ft 0 in (2.07 m)

Career information
- Playing career: 2003–2018
- Position: forward

Career history
- 2003–2007: Henan Dragons/Shanxi Yujun
- 2007–2015: Bayi Rockets
- 2015–2016: Xinjiang Flying Tigers
- 2016–2018: Shanxi Loongs
Medals
Men's basketball
Representing China
FIBA Asia Cup
Silver medal – second place	2009 Tianjin
FIBA Asia Under-18 Championship
Gold medal – first place	2002 Kuwait
FIBA Asia Under-20 Championship
Silver medal – second place	2004 Tehran

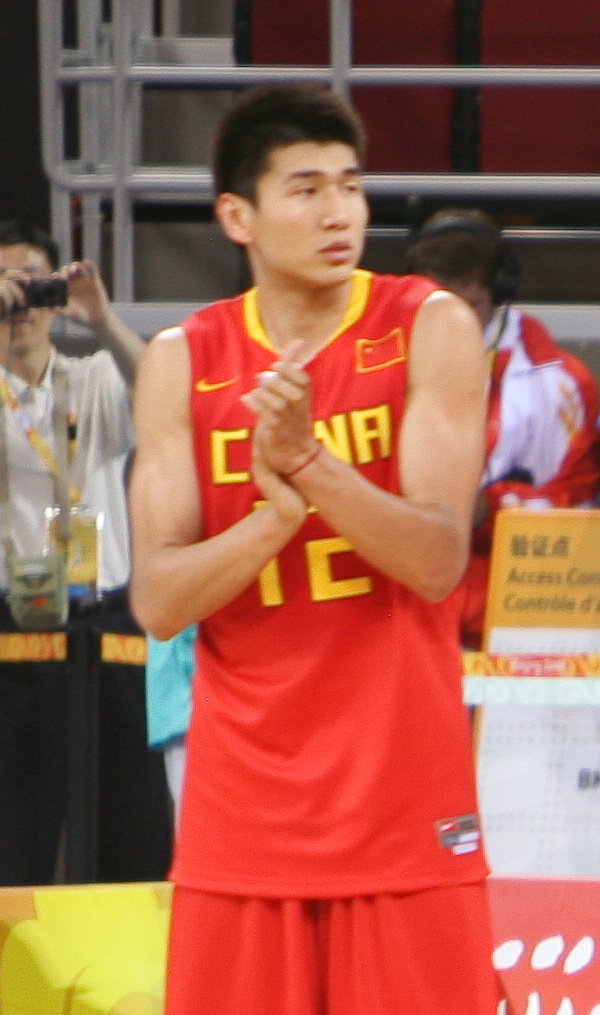
Wang Lei - Beijing 2008 Olympics

Wang Lei, (Chinese: 王磊; pinyin: Wáng Lěi; born August 12, 1986, in Jinan, Shandong), is a former professional basketball player from the People's Republic of China. Wang played as forward. He is 2.03 m (6 ft 8 in) in height and he weighs 95 kg (209 lb).
