= Steponas Babrauskas =

Lithuanian basketball player (born 1984)

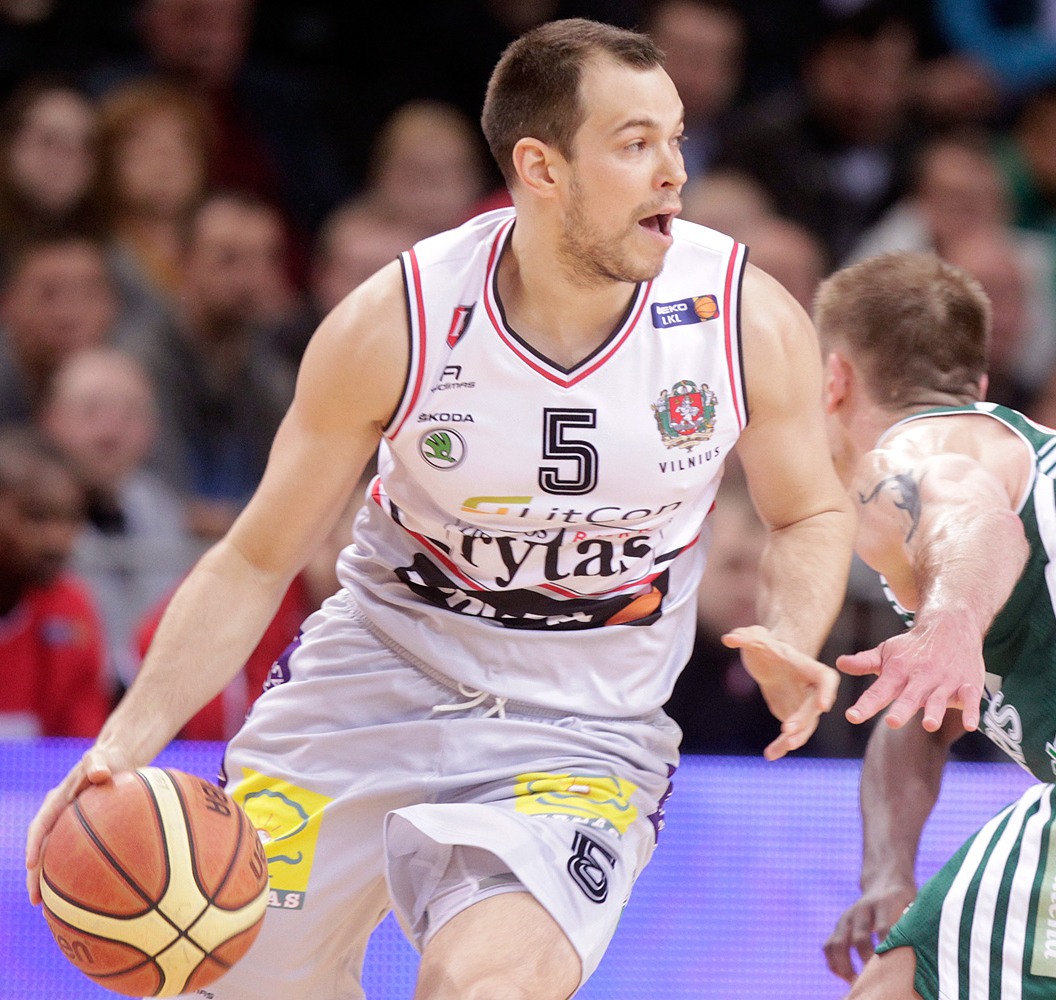
- Babrauskas with Lietuvos rytas, in 2014.

Jonava Hipocredit
- Title: Head coach
- League: Lithuanian Basketball League

Personal information
- Born: June 20, 1984 (age 42) Trakai, Lithuanian SSR, Soviet Union
- Listed height: 6 ft 6 in (1.98 m)
- Listed weight: 206.8 lb (94 kg)

Career information
- NBA draft: 2006: undrafted
- Playing career: 2002–2020
- Position: Shooting guard / small forward
- Coaching career: 2023–present

Career history

Playing
- 2002–2003: Sakalai Vilnius
- 2003–2006: Lietuvos rytas Vilnius
- 2004–2005: →Sakalai Vilnius
- 2005–2006: →Leuven Basket Groot
- 2006–2007: ASK Riga
- 2007: Varese
- 2007–2008: Scafati
- 2008–2014: Lietuvos rytas Vilnius
- 2014–2015: İstanbul BB
- 2015–2018: Pieno žvaigždės
- 2018–2019: Dzūkija
- 2020: Nuova Matteotti

Coaching
- 2023–2024: Pieno žvaigždės (assistant)
- 2024–2025: CBet Jonava / Jonava Hipocredit (assistant)
- 2025-present: Jonava Hipocredit

Career highlights
- 2× Lithuanian All-Star (2009, 2010)
Medals
Representing Lithuania
FIBA Under-21 World Cup
Gold medal – first place	2005 Argentina	Under-21
FIBA Under-19 World Cup
Silver medal – second place	2003 Greece	Under-19
FIBA Europe Under-20 Championship
Bronze medal – third place	2004 Czech Republic	Under-20
Summer Universiade
Gold medal – first place	2007 Thailand

Steponas Babrauskas (born June 20, 1984) is a Lithuanian professional basketball coach and former player. He currently serves as the head coach at Jonava Hipocredit.

== Professional career ==
Babrauskas was a runner-up in the Lithuanian Basketball League (LKL) with Lietuvos Rytas, in 2004. He won the Latvian Basketball League (LBL) with ASK Riga, in 2007. In 2008, he returned to Lietuvos Rytas, and was named the team's captain. With Rytas, he won the European secondary level EuroCup championship, the Lithuanian League championship, and the Baltic League (BBL) championship. He was one of the most hated opposing players by the rival fans of Žalgiris Kaunas.

He had a brief stint in Turkey, in the 2014–15 season, a year removed after he left Rytas. He played for three seasons with Pieno žvaigždės, with whom he won the Baltic League in 2018. He moved to Dzūkija in 2018.

== National team career ==
Babrauskas' first major achievement in basketball came at the 2003 FIBA Under-19 World Cup in Greece, where he and the Lithuanian Under-19 National Basketball Team won silver medals. He also won a bronze medal at the 2004 FIBA Europe Under-20 Championship, in the Czech Republic. He first won a gold medal at the 2005 FIBA Under-21 World Cup, in Argentina. He also helped the Lithuanian junior team to win gold medals at the 2007 Summer Universiade.

== Career statistics ==
Legend
GP	Games played	GS	Games started	MPG	Minutes per game
FG%	Field-goal percentage	3P%	3-point field-goal percentage	FT%	Free-throw percentage
RPG	Rebounds per game	APG	Assists per game	SPG	Steals per game
BPG	Blocks per game	PPG	Points per game	PIR	Performance index rating
**Bold**	Career high

=== EuroLeague ===
Year	Team	GP	GS	MPG	FG%	3P%	FT%	RPG	APG	SPG	BPG	PPG	PIR
2009–10	Lietuvos Rytas	10	0	20.1	.368	.405	.625	2.6	.3	.2	**.1**	**7.0**	2.6
2010–11	Lietuvos Rytas	**14**	1	11.3	.250	**.471**	.500	.9	.2	.4	.0	2.4	.8
2012–13	Lietuvos Rytas	10	1	**23.0**	.280	.357	.722	**3.2**	.5	.6	**.1**	5.7	**3.8**
2013–14	Lietuvos Rytas	10	**6**	17.0	**.545**	.261	**.800**	1.9	**.7**	**1.2**	.0	4.2	3.1

== Awards and honors ==
=== Pro clubs ===
- Latvian League Champion: 2007
- Baltic League Presidents Cup Winner: 2008
- Lithuanian Federation Cup Winner: 2009
- EuroCup Champion: 2009
- 2× Lithuanian League Champion: 2009, 2010

=== Lithuanian junior national team ===
- 2003 FIBA Under-19 World Cup: Silver
- 2004 FIBA Europe Under-20 Championship: Bronze
- 2005 FIBA Under-21 World Cup: Gold
- 2007 Summer Universiade: Gold
