= Rajiv Gandhi International Indoor Stadium, Kottayam =

Sports complex in Kottayam, Kerala, India

Rajiv Gandhi Indoor Stadium
- Location: Kurien Uthup Road, Nagambadom, Kottayam
- Owner: Kottayam Municipality
- Operator: Kottayam Municipality
- Capacity: 1,100
- Surface: Maple Floor

Construction
- Opened: 26 February 2016
- Cost: 19 crores

Rajiv Gandhi Indoor Stadium is a multi-purpose sports complex in Kottayam, Kerala, India.
