= Marius Prekevičius =

Lithuanian basketball player (born 1984)

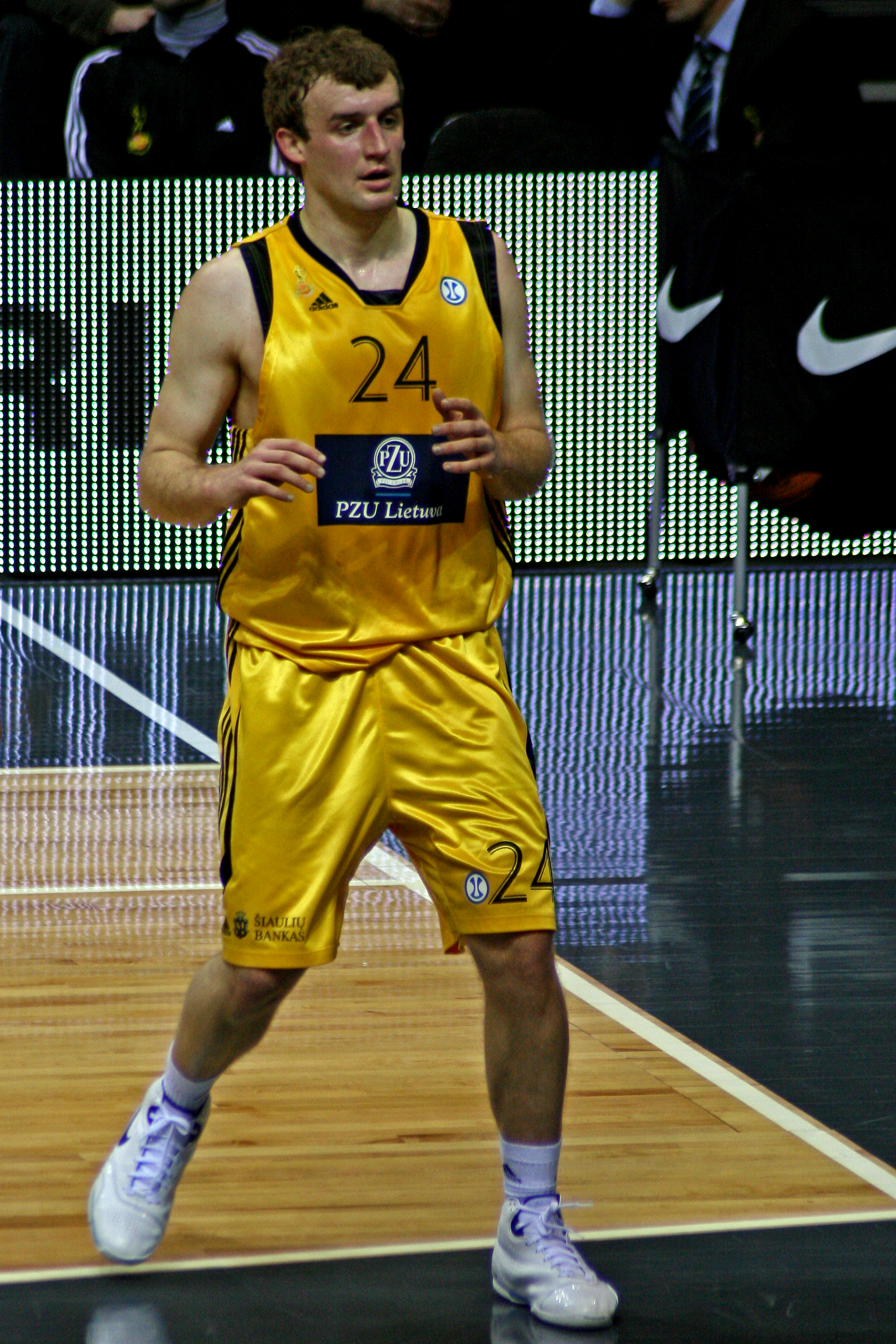

Personal information
- Born: 22 May 1984 (age 42) Gargždai, Lithuanian SSR, Soviet Union
- Listed height: 6 ft 4.75 in (1.95 m)
- Listed weight: 210 lb (95 kg)

Career information
- Playing career: 2001–2013
- Position: Point guard / shooting guard

Career history
- 2001–2002: Sakalai Vilnius
- 2005–2006: Anwil Włocławek
- 2006–2008: Šiauliai
- 2008–2009: Lietuvos rytas Vilnius
- 2009: Azovmash
- 2010: Šiauliai
- 2010-2011: Juventus Utena
- 2011-2012: Šiauliai
- 2013: Sanaye Petrochimi

Career highlights
- 3-time LKL 3rd place winner
Medals
Men's basketball
Representing Lithuania
FIBA Under-21 World Championship
Gold medal – first place	2005 Argentina	National Team
FIBA Europe Under-20 Championship
Bronze medal – third place	2004 Czech Republic	National Team
FIBA Under-19 World Championship
Silver medal – second place	2003 Greece	National Team

Marius Prekevičius (born 22 May 1984 in Gargždai, Klaipėda County) is a Lithuanian former professional basketball. He was a member of the national team at the 2008 Summer Olympics.

== Awards and achievements ==
- Baltic Basketball League Presidents Cup winner: 2008
- LKL 3rd-place winner: 2007, 2008
- LKF cup winner: 2009
