= Rajiv Gandhi Sports Complex =

Indian sports complex

Coordinates: 28.544°N 76.362°E

- Rajiv Gandhi Sports Stadium
- Interactive map of Rajiv Gandhi Sports Complex
- Location: Sector06 Rohtak, Haryana
- Country: India
- Establishment: 2012
- Capacity: 8,000
- Owner: Haryana Urban Development Authority
- Operator: Haryana Urban Development Authority

Rajiv Gandhi Sports Complex is a sports stadium in Rohtak, Haryana. The stadium was established in 2012 and is owned by Haryana Urban Development Authority. The stadium is the premier sports venue in the city with a capacity of 8,000 with international standard facilities. The stadium has got facilities for various sports like cricket, football, hockey etc. There are also facilities for indoor sports such as basketball, badminton, gymnastics, handball, volleyball, lawn tennis, table tennis, weight lifting and kabaddi etc.

The stadium was built with the cost of Rs. 151 crores.
