= Jaber Rouzbahani =

Iranian professional basketball player (born 1986)

Foolad Mahan
- Position: Center

Personal information
- Born: May 10, 1986 (age 40) Isfahan, Iran
- Listed height: 7 ft 4 in (2.24 m)
- Listed weight: 252 lb (114 kg)

Career information
- Playing career: 2002–2015

Career history
- 2002–2010: Zob Ahan
- ?: → Saba Battery
- 2010–2011: Mahram
- 2011–: Foolad Mahan

Jaber Rouzbahani Darrehsari (Persian: جابر روزبهانی دره‌ساری; born May 10, 1986, in Isfahan, Iran) is an Iranian professional basketball player, who currently plays for Foolad Mahan Isfahan in the Iranian Super League. He is a center known for his large size, with a height of 7 feet 4 inches, a weight of 252 pounds, and with an 8-foot armspan. Outside Iran, he is most famous for attempting to enter the National Basketball Association in the 2004 NBA draft. He was not drafted and currently has not been signed by any NBA teams.

== Pro career ==
He has been playing basketball since he was 14, and has played for Zob Ahan Isfahan in Iran. He lived in Richmond, California.

== Iranian national basketball team ==
Jaber Rouzbahani
Medal record

Men's basketball

Representing Iran

Asian Championship
Gold medal – first place	2007 Tokushima	Team

He played with the junior Iranian national team at the 2003 FIBA Under-19 World Championship in Thessaloniki, Greece where he averaged 12 points, 8 rebounds and 7 blocks per game.

He has also played on the senior Iranian national basketball team for three years, and played with them in the 2003 Asian Championship games in Harbin, China, where the team reached the Quarter Finals .

== Honours ==
=== National team ===
- Asian Championship
  - Gold medal: 2007
- Asian Under-20 Championship
  - Gold medal: 2004
- Asian Under-18 Championship
  - Gold medal: 2004
  - Silver medal: 2002
- Islamic Solidarity Games
  - Bronze medal: 2005
