= 2010–11 Baltic Basketball League =

2010–11 BBL season
- League: Baltic Basketball League
- Sport: Basketball
- Teams: 14 (Elite Division); 10 (Challenge Cup)
- TV partner: Viasat Sport Baltic

Regular Season
- Season champions: Elite Division: BK VEF Rīga; Challenge Cup: BC Juventus

BBL Finals
- Champions: Elite Division: BC Žalgiris; Challenge Cup: BC Juventus

BBL seasons
- ← 2009–10 2011–12 →

The MasterCard Baltic Basketball League 2010–11 was the 7th season of the Baltic Basketball League and the second under the title sponsorship of Mastercard. It was the fourth season of BBL as a two division league.

The format featured 14 teams in the Elite Division and 10 teams in the Challenge Cup. Elite Division regular season started on September 29, 2010, and ended with the Final Four held in the Kaunas Sports Hall. It was won by BC Žalgiris who defeated BK VEF Rīga in the championship game on April 10, 2011.

Challenge Cup regular season started on October 12, 2010, and ended with two-legged finals between BC Juventus and KK Kaunas. The champions were BC Juventus who won both games.

== Teams ==
Elite Division

Country (League)	Teams	Teams (ranking in 2009–10 national championship)					
Lithuania (LKL)	6	BC Lietuvos Rytas^ (1)	BC Žalgiris^ (2)	BC Šiauliai (SF)	BC Rūdupis‡ (QF)	BC Perlas (QF)	BC Nevėžis (12)
Latvia (LBL)	4	BK VEF Rīga (2)	BK Ventspils (SF)	SK Valmiera (SF)	BK Liepājas Lauvas (QF)		
Estonia (KML)	3	Tartu Ülikool/Rock (1)	BC Kalev/Cramo (SF)	TTÜ/Kalev (SF)			
Sweden (Ligan)	1	Norrköping Dolphins† (1)					

† As winner of the 2009–10 Challenge Cup
‡ As runner-up of the 2009–10 Challenge Cup
^ Qualified directly to playoffs

Challenge Cup

Country (League)	Teams	Teams (ranking in 2009–10 national championship)						
Lithuania (LKL)	7	BC Juventus (SF)	BC Neptūnas (QF)	BC Techasas (QF)	BC Sakalai (9)	BC Alytus (11)	KK Kaunas (13)	BC Naglis (NKL 1)
Latvia (LBL)	1	BK Zemgale (QF)						
Estonia (KML)	1	BC Rakvere Tarvas (2)						
Kazakhstan (D1)	1	BC Barsy Atyrau (SF)						

== Elite Division ==
=== Regular season ===
The Regular season began on October 29, 2010, with BK Ventspils hosting BC Rūdupis.

	Team	Pts	Pld	W	L	PF	PA	Diff	Qualification
1	(Latvia) BK VEF Rīga	39	22	17	5	1777	1571	+206	Qualified for the Playoffs
2	(Latvia) BK Ventspils	39	22	17	5	1751	1561	+190	Qualified for the Playoffs
3	(Estonia) Tartu Ülikool/Rock	36	22	14	8	1711	1617	+94	Qualified for the Playoffs
4	(Lithuania) BC Rūdupis	36	22	14	8	1813	1636	+177	Qualified for the Playoffs
5	(Lithuania) BC Šiauliai	35	22	13	9	1782	1761	+21	Qualified for the Playoffs
6	(Lithuania) BC Nevėžis	35	22	13	9	1654	1628	+26	Qualified for the Playoffs
7	(Estonia) BC Kalev/Cramo	34	22	12	10	1741	1661	+80	
8	(Sweden) Norrköping Dolphins	31	22	9	13	1795	1911	-116	
9	(Lithuania) BC Perlas	31	22	9	13	1593	1608	-15	
10	(Latvia) BK Liepājas Lauvas	29	22	7	15	1653	1815	-162	
11	(Estonia) TTÜ/Kalev	28	22	6	16	1589	1808	-219	Qualified for the Relegation Playoffs
12	(Latvia) SK Valmiera	23	22	1	21	1452	1734	-282	Qualified for the Relegation Playoffs

=== Playoffs ===
2009–10 Elite Division finalists BC Žalgiris and BC Lietuvos Rytas qualified directly to quarterfinals where they were joined by the six top teams of the regular season.

Quarter-finals
(Lithuania) BC Žalgiris	104 78
(Lithuania) BC Nevėžis	70 66
(Latvia) BK Ventspils	84 62
(Estonia) Tartu Ülikool/Rock	77 61
(Lithuania) BC Lietuvos Rytas	90 85
(Lithuania) BC Šiauliai	89 72
(Latvia) BK VEF Rīga	91 82
(Lithuania) BC Rūdupis	65 67

Semi-finals
(Lithuania) BC Žalgiris	108
(Latvia) BK Ventspils	55
(Lithuania) BC Lietuvos Rytas	68
(Latvia) BK VEF Rīga	79

Final
(Lithuania) BC Žalgiris	75
(Latvia) BK VEF Rīga	67
Third place
(Latvia) BK Ventspils	80
(Lithuania) BC Lietuvos Rytas	84

2010/2011 Baltic Basketball League Champions

BC Žalgiris
Fourth Title

==== Quarterfinals ====
BC Žalgiris vs. BC Nevėžis

March 14th
19:15

Report

BC Žalgiris (Lithuania)	104–70	(Lithuania) BC Nevėžis
Scoring by quarter: 24-19, 24-18, 27-18, 29-15
Pts: Klimavičius 21; Rebs: Klimavičius 9 Asts: Ćapin 5		Pts: Dimša 16; Rebs: Dimša 8 Asts: Alijevas 8
1–0

Kaunas Sports Hall
Attendance: 2411
Referees: Antanas Ramanauskas (LTU)
Antanas Gelazius (LTU)
Arturas Sukys (LTU)

March 19th
17:30

Report

BC Nevėžis (Lithuania)	66–78	(Lithuania) BC Žalgiris
Scoring by quarter: 23-15, 17-18, 11-22, 15-23
Pts: Alijevas 23; Rebs: Alijevas 11; Asts: Alijevas 5		Pts: Two players 15; Rebs: Three players 5 Asts: Collins 3
0–2

Kėdainiai Sports School
Attendance: 950
Referees: Martynas Gudas (LTU)
Vilius Maciulaitis (LTU)
Gytis Vilius (LTU)

BK Ventspils vs. Tartu Ülikool/Rock

March 11th
19:00

Report

BK Ventspils (Latvia)	84–77	(Estonia) Tartu Ülikool/Rock
Scoring by quarter: 17-20, 23-24, 18-13, 26-20
Pts: Bērziņš 16; Rebs: Two players 7 Asts: Strēlnieks 3		Pts: Veideman 15; Rebs: Doronin 6 Asts: Sokk 5
1–0

Ventspils Olympic Center
Attendance: 1200
Referees: Jurgis Laurinavicius (LTU)
Oskars Lucis (LAT)
Mart Uuehendrik (EST)

March 17th
18:00

Report

Tartu Ülikool/Rock (Estonia)	61–62	(Latvia) BK Ventspils
Scoring by quarter: 16-13, 13-17, 18-13, 14-19
Pts: Eichfuss 12; Rebs: Eziukwu 13; Asts: Sokk 4		Pts: Two players 10; Rebs: Hunter 9 Asts: Bērziņš 4
0–2

Tartu University Sports Hall
Attendance: 2000
Referees: Atso Matsalu (EST)
Tomas Jasevicius (LTU)
Andris Aunkrogers (LAT)

Lietuvos Rytas vs. Šiauliai

March 15th
19:00

Report

BC Lietuvos Rytas (Lithuania)	90–89	(Lithuania) BC Šiauliai
Scoring by quarter: 32-21, 20-26, 23-26, 15-16
Pts: Bajramović 23; Rebs: Jomantas 11; Asts: Jomantas 5		Pts: Ruzgas 19; Rebs: Šarakauskas 9 Asts: Broadus 7
1–0

Lietuvos rytas Arena
Attendance: 670
Referees: Tomas Jasevicius (LTU)
Rimantas Bielinis (LTU)
Andrius Maleckas (LTU)

March 20th
19:00

Report

BC Šiauliai (Lithuania)	72–85	(Lithuania) BC Lietuvos Rytas
Scoring by quarter: 31-17, 16-21, 13-22, 12-25
Pts: Gvezdauskas 23; Rebs: Delaš 6 Asts: Broadus 4		Pts: Valančiūnas 22; Rebs: Valančiūnas 7 Asts: Strawberry 6
0–2

Šiauliai Arena
Attendance: 2790
Referees: Jurgis Laurinavicius (LTU)
Saulius Paskevicius (LTU)
Virgilijus Urbsys (LTU)

BK VEF Rīga vs. BC Rūdupis

March 15th
19:30

Report

BK VEF Rīga (Latvia)	91–65	(Lithuania) BC Rūdupis
Scoring by quarter: 27-22, 30-12, 17-19, 17-12
Pts: Parakhouski 19; Rebs: Three players 5 Asts: Two players 4		Pts: Želionis 18; Rebs: Želionis 6 Asts: Two players 3
1–0

Olimpiskais Sporta Centrs
Attendance: 300
Referees: Olegs Latisevs (LAT)
Martynas Gudas (LTU)
Timo Suslov (EST)

March 19th
16:00

Report

BC Rūdupis (Lithuania)	67–82	(Latvia) BK VEF Rīga
Scoring by quarter: 22-26, 9-15, 19-22, 17-19
Pts: Juškevičius 20; Rebs: Lipkevičius 7 Asts: Dainys 5		Pts: Bertāns 18; Rebs: Parakhouski 7 Asts: Bertāns 4
0–2

Prienai Region Municipality's Physical Education and Sports Centre's Hall
Attendance: 500
Referees: Tomas Jasevicius (LTU)
Juris Kokainis (LAT)
Tanel Suslov (EST)

==== Semifinals ====
April 9th
18:00

Report

BC Žalgiris (Lithuania)	108–55	(Latvia) BK Ventspils
Scoring by quarter: 30-14, 31-11, 26-12, 21-18
Pts: Brown 21; Rebs: Plaisted 8 Asts: Kalnietis 8		Pts: Hunter 13; Rebs: Three players 4 Asts: Two players 4

Kaunas Sports Hall
Attendance: 4150
Referees: Atso Matsalu (EST)
Arnis Ozols (LAT)
Gintaras Vitkauskas (LTU)

April 9th
20:30

Report

BC Lietuvos Rytas (Lithuania)	68–79	(Latvia) BK VEF Rīga
Scoring by quarter: 20-24, 11-14, 17-14, 20-27
Pts: Bajramović 17; Rebs: Two players 9 Asts: Rašić 4		Pts: Parakhouski 20; Rebs: Two players 5 Asts: Hughes 3

Kaunas Sports Hall
Attendance: 3270
Referees: Olegs Latisevs (LAT)
Jurgis Laurinavicius (LTU)
Aare Halliko (EST)

==== Third place game ====
April 10th
15:00

Report

BK Ventspils (Latvia)	80–84	(Lithuania) BC Lietuvos Rytas
Scoring by quarter: 21-24, 18-19, 23-27, 18-14
Pts: Hunter 19; Rebs: Hunter 8 Asts: Strēlnieks 6		Pts: Bajramović 20; Rebs: Valančiūnas 8 Asts: Two players 5

Kaunas Sports Hall
Attendance: 2700
Referees: Atso Matsalu (EST)
Jurgis Laurinavicius (LTU)
Arnis Ozols (LAT)

==== Final ====
April 10th
17:30

Report

BC Žalgiris (Lithuania)	75–67	(Latvia) BK VEF Rīga
Scoring by quarter: 20-14, 20-21, 13-20, 22-12
Pts: Klimavičius 15; Rebs: Klimavičius 9 Asts: Collins 6		Pts: Hughes 16; Rebs: Three players 5 Asts: Janičenoks 5

Kaunas Sports Hall
Attendance: 4712
Referees: Olegs Latisevs (LAT)
Aare Halliko (EST)
Gintaras Vitkauskas (LTU)

== Challenge Cup ==
=== Regular season ===
==== Round 1 ====
Group A

	Team	Pts	Pld	W	L	PF	PA	Diff	Qualification
1	(Latvia) BK Zemgale	14	8	6	2	670	633	+37	Qualified for Round 2
2	(Lithuania) BC Neptūnas	14	8	6	2	721	612	+109	Qualified for Round 2
3	(Lithuania) BC Alytus	12	8	4	4	648	670	-22	Qualified for Round 2
4	(Kazakhstan) BC Barsy Atyrau	10	8	2	6	634	696	-62	
5	(Lithuania) BC Naglis	10	8	2	6	598	660	-62	

Group B

	Team	Pts	Pld	W	L	PF	PA	Diff	Qualification
1	(Lithuania) BC Juventus	14	8	6	2	620	591	+29	Qualified for Round 2
2	(Lithuania) KK Kaunas	13	8	5	3	642	606	+36	Qualified for Round 2
3	(Lithuania) BC Techasas	12	8	4	4	633	642	-9	Qualified for Round 2
4	(Lithuania) BC Sakalai	11	8	3	5	611	641	-30	
5	(Estonia) BC Rakvere Tarvas	10	8	2	6	632	658	-26	

==== Round 2 ====
	Team	Pts	Pld	W	L	PF	PA	Diff	Qualification
1	(Lithuania) BC Juventus	17	10	7	3	842	775	+67	Qualified for the Playoffs
2	(Lithuania) KK Kaunas	16	10	6	4	807	776	+31	Qualified for the Playoffs
3	(Lithuania) BC Techasas	16	10	6	4	807	781	+26	Qualified for the Playoffs
4	(Lithuania) BC Neptūnas	15	10	5	5	830	814	+16	Qualified for the Playoffs
5	(Latvia) BK Zemgale	14	10	4	6	815	843	-28	
6	(Lithuania) BC Alytus	12	10	2	8	752	864	-113	

=== Play-offs ===
Semi-finals
(Lithuania) BC Neptūnas	82 74
(Lithuania) BC Juventus	79 94
(Lithuania) BC Techasas	82 79
(Lithuania) KK Kaunas	78 88

Final
(Lithuania) BC Juventus	87 89
(Lithuania) KK Kaunas	81 72
Third place
(Lithuania) BC Neptūnas	93 75
(Lithuania) BC Techasas	77 100

2010/2011 BBL Challenge Cup Champions

BC Juventus
First Title

==== Semifinals ====
BC Neptūnas vs. BC Juventus

March 1st
18:00

Report

BC Neptūnas (Lithuania)	82–79	(Lithuania) BC Juventus
Scoring by quarter: 18-19, 20-15, 20-23, 24-22
Pts: Vasylius 27; Rebs: Ruikis 7 Asts: Brūniņš 4		Pts: Čepukaitis 17; Rebs: Kieža 9 Asts: Two players 5
1–0

Neptunas Basketball Arena
Attendance: 700
Referees: Romualdas Brazauskas (LTU)
Saulius Paskevicius (LTU)
Danielius Bandzevicius (LTU)

March 11th
17:30

Report

BC Juventus (Lithuania)	94–74	(Lithuania) BC Neptūnas
Scoring by quarter: 32-16, 27-24, 22-19, 13-15
Pts: Prekevičius 19; Rebs: Kieža 11; Asts: Prekevičius 6		Pts: Vasylius 18; Rebs: Vasylius 5 Asts: Vasylius 5
1–1; 173–156

Utena's Arena
Attendance: 1550
Referees: Mindaugas Vecerskis (LTU)
Vilius Maciulaitis (LTU)
Ramunas Zukauskas (LTU)

BC Techasas vs. KK Kaunas

March 1st
18:00

Report

BC Techasas (Lithuania)	82–78	(Lithuania) KK Kaunas
Scoring by quarter: 15-10, 28-22, 15-24, 24-22
Pts: Volkus 30; Rebs: Three players 6 Asts: Rinkevičius 6		Pts: Two players 20; Rebs: Čukinas 12; Asts: Vasiliauskas 7
1–0

Cido Arena
Attendance: 600
Referees: Antanas Ramanauskas (LTU)
Tomas Langvinis (LTU)
Ignas Davainis (LTU)

March 11th
17:00

Report

KK Kaunas (Lithuania)	88–79	(Lithuania) BC Techasas
Scoring by quarter: 19-21, 13-21, 31-14, 25-23
Pts: Čukinas 23; Rebs: Čukinas 10; Asts: Vasiliauskas 6		Pts: Two players 20; Rebs: Valukonis 7 Asts: Two players 5
1–1; 166–161

Sports Complex of Sabonis Basketball Centre
Attendance: 200
Referees: Tomas Jasevicius (LTU)
Rimantas Bielinis (LTU)
Andrius Maleckas (LTU)

==== Third place games ====
BC Neptūnas vs. BC Techasas

March 15th
18:00

Report

BC Neptūnas (Lithuania)	93–77	(Lithuania) BC Techasas
Scoring by quarter: 29-17, 14-20, 29-26, 21-14
Pts: Ruikis 23; Rebs: Vasylius 11; Asts: Vasylius 5		Pts: Leonavičius 24; Rebs: Šilinskis 8 Asts: Leonavičius 4
1–0

Neptunas Basketball Arena
Attendance: 500
Referees: Jurgis Laurinavicius (LTU)
Antanas Gelazius (LTU)
Algirdas Bataitis (LTU)

March 18th
18:00

Report

BC Techasas (Lithuania)	100–75	(Lithuania) BC Neptūnas
Scoring by quarter: 22-17, 27-24, 21-14, 30-20
Pts: Valukonis 22; Rebs: Volkus 9 Asts: Rinkevičius 5		Pts: Mažeika 17; Rebs: Bonner 8 Asts: Žurna 4
1–1; 177–168

Cido Arena
Attendance: 800
Referees: Gintaras Vitkauskas (LTU)
Martynas Gudas (LTU)
Linas Masiulis (LTU)

==== Finals ====
BC Juventus vs. KK Kaunas

March 15th
18:00

Report

KK Kaunas (Lithuania)	81–87	(Lithuania) BC Juventus
Scoring by quarter: 20-21, 22-31, 15-20, 24-15
Pts: Čukinas 25; Rebs: Drungilas 8 Asts: Vasiliauskas 7		Pts: Kieža 21; Rebs: Kieža 11; Asts: Three players 3
0–1

Sports Complex of Sabonis Basketball Centre
Attendance: 200
Referees: Antanas Ramanauskas (LTU)
Gintaras Vitkauskas (LTU)
Vilius Maciulaitis (LTU)

March 19th
17:00

Report

BC Juventus (Lithuania)	89–72	(Lithuania) KK Kaunas
Scoring by quarter: 29-13, 19-18, 16-24, 25-17
Pts: Maceina 14; Rebs: Kieža 10; Asts: Maceina 10		Pts: Uzas 21; Rebs: Two players 8 Asts: Vasiliauskas 4
2–0; 176–153

Utena's Arena
Attendance: 1300
Referees: Mindaugas Vecerskis (LTU)
Rimantas Bielinis (LTU)
Ramunas Zukauskas (LTU)

=== Relegation Playoffs ===
TTÜ/Kalev and SK Valmiera from the Elite Division and the Challenge Cup finalists BC Juventus and KK Kaunas participate in a two-legged playoffs for two spots in the BBL Elite Division for 2011–12 season.

==== Qualification – Pair A ====
April 10th
17:00

Report

BC Juventus (Lithuania)	81–69	(Latvia) SK Valmiera
Scoring by quarter: 19-17, 23-18, 17-17, 22-17
Pts: Prekevičius 24; Rebs: Two players 5 Asts: Kieža 6		Pts: Ziediņš 16; Rebs: Two players 9 Asts: Two players 3
1–0

Utena's Arena
Attendance: 900
Referees: Andres Tobi (EST)
Tanel Suslov (EST)
Timo Suslov (EST)

April 15th
18:30

Report

SK Valmiera (Latvia)	72–76	(Lithuania) BC Juventus
Scoring by quarter: 14-18, 15-19, 22-17, 21-22
Pts: Veselovs 16; Rebs: Bērziņš 9 Asts: Three players 4		Pts: Kieža 19; Rebs: Urbonas 10; Asts: Pociukonis 4
0–2

Vidzemes Olimpiskais Centrs
Attendance: 400
Referees: Atso Matsalu (EST)
Aare Halliko (EST)
Mart Uuehendrik (EST)

==== Qualification – Pair B ====
April 10th
14:00

Report

KK Kaunas (Lithuania)	85–76	(Estonia) TTÜ/Kalev
Scoring by quarter: 20-23, 20-10, 19-24, 26-19
Pts: Čukinas 21; Rebs: Čukinas 8 Asts: Jasikevičius 5		Pts: Osby 21; Rebs: Osby 12; Asts: Kriisa 7
1–0

Sports Complex of Sabonis Basketball Centre
Attendance: 150
Referees: Oskars Lucis (LAT)
Andris Aunkrogers (LAT)
Andris Vaskans (LAT)

April 15th
18:30

Report

TTÜ/Kalev (Estonia)	65–75	(Lithuania) KK Kaunas
Scoring by quarter: 19-24, 18-12, 21-18, 7-21
Pts: Pilk 14; Rebs: Osby 17; Asts: Archibald 4		Pts: Jasikevičius 21; Rebs: Drungilas 13; Asts: Vasiliauskas 4
0–2

TTÜ Sports Hall
Attendance: 360
Referees: Juris Kokainis (LAT)
Ingus Baumanis (LAT)
Mareks Volskis (LAT)

- BC Juventus and KK Kaunas will play in the BBL Elite Division in the 2011–12 season.
- SK Valmiera and TTÜ/Kalev will be relegated to the BBL Challenge Cup for the 2011–12 season.

== Individual statistics ==
Note: Excluded are all players who have played less than 10 games during all stages of the season in their respective division.

=== Elite Division ===
Points

Rank	Name	Team	Games	Pts.	PPG
1.	(United States) Bambale Osby	(Estonia) TTÜ/Kalev	22	410	18.64
2.	(Lithuania) Adas Juškevičius	(Lithuania) BC Rūdupis	23	356	15.48
3.	(Belarus) Artsiom Parakhouski	(Latvia) BK VEF Rīga	25	381	15.24
4.	(Lithuania) Egidijus Dimša	(Lithuania) BC Nevėžis	24	359	14.96
5.	(Sweden) Joakim Kjellbom	(Sweden) Norrköping Dolphins	20	296	14.80

Rebounds

Rank	Name	Team	Games	Rbs.	RPG
1.	(United States) Bambale Osby	(Estonia) TTÜ/Kalev	22	263	11.95
2.	(United States) Callistus Eziukwu	(Estonia) Tartu Ülikool/Rock	24	214	8.92
3.	(United States) Michael Dunigan	(Estonia) BC Kalev/Cramo	18	144	8.00
4.	(Lithuania) Vytautas Šarakauskas	(Lithuania) BC Šiauliai	24	173	7.21
5.	(Lithuania) Saulius Kuzminskas	(Latvia) BK Ventspils	21	143	6.81

Assists

Rank	Name	Team	Games	Ast.	APG
1.	(Lithuania) Evaldas Dainys	(Lithuania) BC Rūdupis	16	84	5.25
2.	(United States) Rashaun Broadus	(Lithuania) BC Šiauliai	12	61	5.08
3.	(Estonia) Valmo Kriisa	(Estonia) TTÜ/Kalev	22	108	4.91
4.	(Lithuania) Rolandas Alijevas	(Lithuania) BC Nevėžis	20	95	4.75
5.	(Lithuania) Aidas Viskontas	(Lithuania) BC Perlas	22	96	4.36

=== Challenge Cup ===
Points

Rank	Name	Team	Games	Pts.	PPG
1.	(Latvia) Ilmars Bergmanis	(Latvia) BK Zemgale	14	266	19.00
2.	(Lithuania) Valdas Vasylius	(Lithuania) KK Neptūnas	18	311	17.28
3.	(Lithuania) Gintaras Leonavičius	(Lithuania) BC Techasas	12	202	16.83
4.	(Lithuania) Šarūnas Vasiliauskas	(Lithuania) KK Kaunas	16	240	15.00
5.	(Latvia) Edgars Krūmiņš	(Latvia) BK Zemgale	14	207	14.79

Rebounds

Rank	Name	Team	Games	Rbs.	RPG
1.	(Lithuania) Aurimas Kieža	(Lithuania) BC Juventus	16	159	9.94
2.	(Lithuania) Saulius Dumbliauskas	(Lithuania) BC Alytus	14	111	7.93
3.	(Lithuania) Pavelas Čukinas	(Lithuania) KK Kaunas	18	136	7.56
4.	(Latvia) Jekabs Rozitis	(Latvia) BK Zemgale	14	105	7.50
5.	(Lithuania) Valdas Vasylius	(Lithuania) KK Neptūnas	18	121	6.72

Assists

Rank	Name	Team	Games	Ast.	APG
1.	(Lithuania) Ernestas Ežerskis	(Lithuania) BC Techasas	17	79	4.65
2.	(Lithuania) Šarūnas Vasiliauskas	(Lithuania) KK Kaunas	16	74	4.63
3.	(Lithuania) Tomas Rinkevičius	(Lithuania) BC Techasas	15	68	4.53
4.	(Lithuania) Gediminas Maceina	(Lithuania) BC Juventus	18	79	4.39
5.	(Lithuania) Vytenis Jasikevičius	(Lithuania) KK Kaunas	17	70	4.12

== Awards ==
=== Elite Division season MVP ===
- (Belarus) Artsiom Parakhouski (BK VEF Rīga)

=== Elite Division Final Four MVP ===
- (Lithuania) Tadas Klimavičius (BC Žalgiris)

=== MVP of the Month ===
==== Elite Division ====
Month	Player	Team
October 2010	(United States) Bambale Osby	(Estonia) TTÜ/Kalev
November 2010	(Lithuania) Edgaras Želionis	(Lithuania) BC Rūdupis
December 2010	(Belarus) Artsiom Parakhouski	(Latvia) BK VEF Rīga
January 2011	(United States) Michael Dunigan	(Estonia) BC Kalev/Cramo
February 2011	(Jamaica) Weyinmi Efejuku	(Latvia) BK Ventspils

==== Challenge Cup ====
Month	Player	Team
October 2010	(Lithuania) Saulius Dumbliauskas	(Lithuania) BC Alytus
November 2010	(Lithuania) Aurimas Kieža	(Lithuania) BC Juventus
December 2010	(Lithuania) Žydrūnas Urbonas	(Lithuania) BC Juventus
January 2011	(Lithuania) Aurimas Kieža	(Lithuania) BC Juventus
February 2011	(Latvia) Ilmars Bergmanis	(Latvia) BK Zemgale
