= 2012–13 LKL season =

Lietuvos krepšinio lyga 2012–13
- League: Lietuvos krepšinio lyga
- Sport: Basketball
- Season MVP: (Lithuania) Gediminas Orelikas
- Finals champions: Žalgiris
- Runners-up: Lietuvos rytas
- Finals MVP: (Lithuania) Mindaugas Kuzminskas

LKL seasons
- ← 2011–12 2013–14 →

The 2012–13 Lietuvos krepšinio lyga was the 20th season of the top-tier level professional basketball league of Lithuania, the Lietuvos krepšinio lyga (LKL).

== Competition format ==
Every team except Žalgiris and Lietuvos rytas played 22 games, two against each other. Those two teams, due to their participation in EuroLeague, played only eleven games, all of them away.

The eight first qualified teams joined the playoffs. Quarterfinal series were played with a best-of-three series format, semifinals with a best-of-five and the finals with a best-of-seven games format. The last qualified of the Regular Season was relegated to the NKL.

== Regular season ==
	Team	Pld	W	L	%	PF	PA	Qualification
1	Žalgiris	12	10	2	.833	1059	761	Playoffs
2	Lietuvos rytas	12	10	2	.833	1089	836	Playoffs
3	Prienai	20	16	4	.800	1810	1486	Playoffs
4	Neptūnas	20	16	4	.800	1747	1576	Playoffs
5	Pieno žvaigždės	20	12	8	.600	1579	1541	Playoffs
6	Šiauliai	20	12	8	.600	1682	1548	Playoffs
7	Juventus	20	11	9	.550	1639	1584	Playoffs
8	Nevėžis	20	8	12	.400	1391	1594	Playoffs
9	Lietkabelis	20	7	13	.350	1529	1691	
10	Sakalai	20	5	15	.250	1381	1553	
11	LSU-Baltai	20	5	15	.250	1408	1717	
12	Palanga Triobet	20	0	20	.000	1383	1810	Relegated

== Playoffs ==
=== Bracket ===
Quarterfinals
1	Žalgiris	2
8	Nevėžis	0
4	Neptūnas	2
5	Pieno žvaigždės	0
2	Lietuvos Rytas	2
7	Juventus	0
3	Prienai	2
6	Šiauliai	0

Semifinals
1	Žalgiris	2
4	Neptūnas	0
2	Lietuvos Rytas	2
3	Prienai	0

Finals
1	Žalgiris	4
2	Lietuvos Rytas	0
Third place
4	Neptūnas	3
3	Prienai	2

=== Quarterfinals ===
==== Žalgiris (1) vs. Nevėžis (8) ====
April 15, 2013
19:20

Report

Žalgiris Kaunas	94–51	Nevėžis Kėdainiai
Scoring by quarter: 23–18, 28–10, 18–9, 25–14
Pts: K. Lavrinovič 14; Rebs: K. Lavrinovič 7 Asts: 3 players 4		Pts: M. Girdžiūnas 12; Rebs: G. Žylė 8 Asts: V. Jasikevičius 5

Žalgiris Arena, Kaunas
Attendance: 6,350

April 18, 2013
19:15

Report

Nevėžis Kėdainiai	71–91	Žalgiris Kaunas
Scoring by quarter: 18–26, 19–21, 21–24, 13–20
Pts: G. Žylė 15; Rebs: 3 players 5 Asts: M. Girdžiūnas 5		Pts: D. Lavrinovič 20; Rebs: R. Javtokas 9 Asts: A. Juškevičius 5

Kėdainiai Sports School, Kėdainiai
Attendance: 600

==== Lietuvos Rytas (2) vs. Juventus (7) ====
April 16, 2013
19:00

Report

Lietuvos Rytas	92–67	Juventus Utena
Scoring by quarter: 32–13, 26–26, 16–18, 18–10
Pts: M. Katelynas 20; Rebs: E. Bendžius 7 Asts: 2 players 6		Pts: A. Čepulis 15; Rebs: D. Leonard 7 Asts: G. Matulis 3

Lietuvos rytas Arena, Vilnius
Attendance: 1,150

April 19, 2013
18:30

Report

Juventus Utena	83–85	Lietuvos Rytas
Scoring by quarter: 19–14, 20–22, 27–25, 17–24
Pts: N. Varnelis 22; Rebs: N. Varnelis 6 Asts: A. Viskontas 7		Pts: R. Seibutis 24; Rebs: M. Katelynas 6 Asts: R. Seibutis 5

Utena's Arena, Utena
Attendance: 1,500

==== Prienai (3) vs. Šiauliai (6) ====
April 15, 2013
19:00

Report

Prienai	92–82	Šiauliai
Scoring by quarter: 24–9, 19–26, 19–19, 30–28
Pts: A. Milaknis 24; Rebs: G. Orelikas 9 Asts: A. Valeika 4		Pts: L. Samėnas 23; Rebs: R. Alijevas 5 Asts: R. Alijevas 8

Prienai KKSC Arena, Prienai
Attendance: 700

April 17, 2013
19:15

Report

Šiauliai	76–93	Prienai
Scoring by quarter: 21–21, 16–25, 18–19, 21–28
Pts: L. Samėnas 19; Rebs: A. Kieža 8 Asts: R. Alijevas 4		Pts: G. Orelikas 25; Rebs: A. Labuckas 8 Asts: A. Valeika 8

Šiauliai Arena, Šiauliai
Attendance: 2,700

==== Neptūnas (4) vs. Pieno žvaigždės (5) ====
April 16, 2013
19:00

Report

Neptūnas Klaipėda	85–71	Pieno žvaigždės
Scoring by quarter: 23–21, 21–18, 24–13, 17–19
Pts: V. Šarakauskas 19; Rebs: V. Vasylius 6 Asts: 2 players 5		Pts: T. Hughes 19; Rebs: 3 players 5 Asts: Š. Vasiliauskas 4

Švyturys Arena, Klaipėda
Attendance: 1,000

April 19, 2013
19:15

Report

Pieno žvaigždės	92–94 (OT)	Neptūnas Klaipėda
Scoring by quarter: 16–8, 18–19, 10–20, 19–16, Overtime: 9–9, 8–8, 12–14
Pts: Š. Vasiliauskas 31; Rebs: G. Sirutavičius 11; Asts: 2 players 3		Pts: R. Broadus 19; Rebs: V. Šarakauskas 14; Asts: R. Broadus 5

Pieno žvaigždės Arena, Pasvalys
Attendance: 300

=== Semifinals ===
==== Lietuvos Rytas (2) vs. Prienai (3) ====
April 24, 2013
19:00

Report

Lietuvos Rytas	75–67	Prienai
Scoring by quarter: 8–12, 34–17, 18–16, 15–22
Pts: N. Nedović 20; Rebs: A. Jomantas 7 Asts: N. Nedović 4		Pts: A. Valeika 19; Rebs: S. Vene 9 Asts: 2 players 3

Siemens Arena, Vilnius
Attendance: 4,750

April 26, 2013
19:00

Report

Prienai	74–86	Lietuvos Rytas
Scoring by quarter: 25–18, 18–27, 17–21, 14–20
Pts: A. Valeika 22; Rebs: A. Valeika 7 Asts: 2 players 4		Pts: R. Seibutis 17; Rebs: E. Bendžius 8 Asts: N. Nedović 5

Prienai KKSC Arena, Prienai
Attendance: 1,200

==== Žalgiris (1) vs. Neptūnas (4) ====
April 23, 2013
19:15

Report

Žalgiris Kaunas	99–83	Neptūnas Klaipėda
Scoring by quarter: 28–19, 20–21, 27–21, 24–22
Pts: K. Lavrinovič 22; Rebs: K. Lavrinovič 7 Asts: M. Popović 7		Pts: D. Gailius 21; Rebs: R. Broadus 5 Asts: 2 players 3

Žalgiris Arena, Kaunas
Attendance: 7,153

April 25, 2013
19:15

Report

Neptūnas Klaipėda	73–90	Žalgiris Kaunas
Scoring by quarter: 15–15, 21–32, 21–17, 16–26
Pts: R. Broadus 19; Rebs: D. Gailius 10; Asts: M. Mažeika 4		Pts: A. Juškevičius 27; Rebs: V. Lipkevičius 5 Asts: 2 players 4

Švyturys Arena, Vilnius
Attendance: 4,500

=== Final ===
April 30, 2013
19:00

Report

Žalgiris Kaunas	88–73	Lietuvos Rytas
Scoring by quarter: 32–18, 24–16, 13–19, 19–20
Pts: M. Kuzminskas 22; Rebs: R. Javtokas 9 Asts: M. Popović 3		Pts: T. Zubčić 14; Rebs: T. Lydeka 7 Asts: N. Nedović 5

Žalgiris Arena, Kaunas
Attendance: 11,640

May 2, 2013
19:00

Report

Lietuvos Rytas	71–77	Žalgiris Kaunas
Scoring by quarter: 15–17, 23–18, 15–20, 18–22
Pts: R. Seibutis 22; Rebs: M. Katelynas 6 Asts: N. Nedović 5		Pts: K. Lavrinovič 22; Rebs: M. Kuzminskas 9 Asts: O. Lafayette 6

Siemens Arena, Vilnius
Attendance: 8,300

May 4, 2013
19:00

Report

Žalgiris Kaunas	72–45	Lietuvos Rytas
Scoring by quarter: 21–8, 18–16, 15–7, 18–14
Pts: K. Lavrinovič 12; Rebs: M. Kuzminskas 9 Asts: O. Lafayette 6		Pts: R. Seibutis 12; Rebs: T. Lydeka 8 Asts: A. Jomantas 4

Žalgiris Arena, Kaunas
Attendance: 11,085

May 7, 2013
19:00

Report

Lietuvos Rytas	65–83	Žalgiris Kaunas
Scoring by quarter: 19–21, 13–8, 19–26, 14–28
Pts: E. Bendžius 15; Rebs: 2 players 6 Asts: N. Nedović 7		Pts: O. Lafayette 18; Rebs: M. Delaš 8 Asts: O. Lafayette 7

Siemens Arena, Vilnius
Attendance: 9,350

=== Third Place ===
May 1, 2013
19:00

Report

Prienai	78–67	Neptūnas
Scoring by quarter: 18–20, 19–17, 18–10, 23–20
Pts: S. Vene 21; Rebs: 3 players 6 Asts: P. Ivanauskas 5		Pts: D. Gailius 17; Rebs: D. Gailius 8 Asts: E. Dainys 4

Prienai KKSC Arena, Prienai
Attendance: 700

May 3, 2013
19:15

Report

Neptūnas	84–82 (OT)	Prienai
Scoring by quarter: 20–20, 20–13, 22–17, 10–22, Overtime: 12–10
Pts: 2 players 14; Rebs: L. Mikalauskas 8 Asts: D. Gailius 8		Pts: A. Milaknis 30; Rebs: S. Vene 8 Asts: S. Vene 5

Švyturys Arena, Klaipėda
Attendance: 3,000

May 6, 2013
19:00

Report

Prienai	83–85	Neptūnas
Scoring by quarter: 29–28, 20–18, 13–22, 21–17
Pts: G. Orelikas 26; Rebs: G. Orelikas 8 Asts: G. Orelikas 7		Pts: D. Gailius 31; Rebs: V. Šarakauskas 10; Asts: G. Gustas 3

Prienai KKSC Arena, Prienai
Attendance: 600

May 9, 2013
19:15

Report

Neptūnas	81–90	Prienai
Scoring by quarter: 21–29, 20–22, 22–22, 18–17
Pts: D. Gailius 28; Rebs: V. Šarakauskas 8 Asts: 2 players 3		Pts: A. Milaknis 23; Rebs: G. Orelikas 9 Asts: P. Ivanauskas 6

Švyturys Arena, Klaipėda
Attendance: 4,000

May 13, 2013
19:00

Report

Prienai	72–86	Neptūnas
Scoring by quarter: 23–23, 19–29, 19–19, 11–15
Pts: G. Orelikas 15; Rebs: 2 players 7 Asts: A. Milaknis 5		Pts: D. Gailius 18; Rebs: D. Gailius 9 Asts: R. Broadus 4

Prienai KKSC Arena, Prienai
Attendance: 1,500

=== Statistics ===
Points

Rank	Name	G	Pts	PPG
1	(Lithuania) Gediminas Orelikas	29	495	17.1
2	(Lithuania) Deividas Gailius	28	475	17.0
3	(United States) Trévon Hughes	22	333	15.1
4	(Lithuania) Renaldas Seibutis	19	287	15.1
5	(Lithuania) Laurynas Samėnas	21	331	15.1

Rebounds

Rank	Name	G	Reb	RPG
1	(Lithuania) Aurimas Kieža	21	189	9.0
2	(United States) Tony Bishop	18	148	8.2
3	(Lithuania) Vytautas Šarakauskas	25	188	7.5
4	(Lithuania) Tomas Urbonas	16	118	7.4
5	(Lithuania) Nerijus Varnelis	22	140	6.4

Assists

Rank	Name	G	Ast	APG
1	(Lithuania) Mindaugas Stašys	20	95	4.8
2	(Lithuania) Rolandas Alijevas	12	54	4.5
3	(Lithuania) Aidas Viskontas	22	98	4.5
4	(United States) Lewis Jackson	19	83	4.4
5	(Lithuania) Jokūbas Gintvainis	20	83	4.2
