= Mario Delaš =

Croatian basketball player (born 1990)

- Delaš with Andorra in 2018

Ribola Kaštela
- Position: Power forward / center
- League: First Men's Basketball League

Personal information
- Born: January 16, 1990 (age 36) Split, SR Croatia, SFR Yugoslavia
- Listed height: 6 ft 9.5 in (2.07 m)
- Listed weight: 227 lb (103 kg)

Career information
- NBA draft: 2012: undrafted
- Playing career: 2006–present

Career history
- 2006–2010: Split
- 2010–2013: Žalgiris
- 2010: →Cibona
- 2010–2011: →BC Šiauliai
- 2011–2012: →BC Baltai
- 2013–2014: Obradoiro CAB
- 2014–2015: Cedevita
- 2016: BC Kalev
- 2016–2018: Orlandina Basket
- 2018: Pallacanestro Varese
- 2018–2019: Egis Körmend
- 2019–2020: Split
- 2020–2021: XL Extralight Montegranaro
- 2021: GTK Gliwice
- 2021–2023: Gipuzkoa
- 2023–2024: Melilla
- 2024–present: Ribola Kaštela

Career highlights
- Baltic League champion (2010); 2× Lithuanian League champion (2012, 2013); Croatian League champion (2015); Estonian League champion (2016); Croatian Cup winner (2015); Croatian League All-Star (2010); Lithuanian League All-Star (2013); FIBA Under-19 World Cup MVP (2009)
Medals
Men's basketball
Representing Croatia
World U-19 Championship
Bronze medal – third place	2009 New Zealand	U-19 Team
European U-18 Championship
Bronze medal – third place	2008 Greece	U-18 Team

Mario Delaš (born January 16, 1990) is a Croatian professional basketball player for Ribola Kaštela of the Croatian second-tier First Men's Basketball League. He is a 2.07 m (6'9 1/2") tall power forward / center.

== Professional career ==
Mario Delaš made his professional debut in KK Split, during the 2006–07 season. In January 2010, he signed a contract with BC Žalgiris for the next 3 1/2 seasons. During the 2010–11 season, he was loaned to KK Cibona and BC Šiauliai. He spent most of the 2011–12 season on loan in the Žalgiris subsidiary BC Baltai, returning to the Žalgiris team in March 2012. He signed with Obradoiro CAB in the summer of 2013. On June 30, 2014, he signed a multi-year deal with Cedevita Zagreb. In the first days of 2016, after spending the first half of the 2015–16 season in Cedevita, without playing a single minute, he moved to the Estonian side Kalev/Cramo for the rest of the season. On September 19, 2016, he signed with the Italian Serie A club Orlandina Basket. On February 14, 2018, he parted ways with Orlandina. Two days later, he signed with Pallacanestro Varese for the remainder of the season.

In December, 2019 Delaš returned to Split of the Croatian League. After spending a month and playing only four games for Split, in January 2020, Delaš moved to XL Extralight Montegranaro of the Italian second-tier Serie A2.

On January 11, 2021, Delaš signed with GTK Gliwice of the PLK.

In August, 2021, Delaš signed with Gipuzkoa of the Spanish second-tier LEB Oro.

After spending a season in the Spanish third-tier Club Melilla Baloncesto where he averaged only 1.9ppg and 2.6rpg, in August 2024 Delaš joined Ribola Kaštela of the Croatian second-tier First Men's Basketball League.

== National team career ==
Delaš represented his country's junior national teams in Under-16, Under-18, Under-19 and Under-20 competitions, winning bronze medals at the 2008 FIBA Europe Under-18 Championship, and at the 2009 FIBA Under-19 World Cup. He was selected to the All-Tournament Teams of both championships, and also won the MVP award in the latter tournament, averaging 20 points per game. His first call-up to the senior men's Croatian national basketball team came in 2013. He was a part of the Croatian team that took 4th place at the 2013 EuroBasket, where he played only a minor role in his team's success.

== Personal life ==
He is the younger brother of Ante Delaš, who is also a professional basketball player, and with whom he played with in Split, Cedevita and the Croatian national basketball team.
