= Marko Popović (basketball, born 1982) =

Croatian basketball player

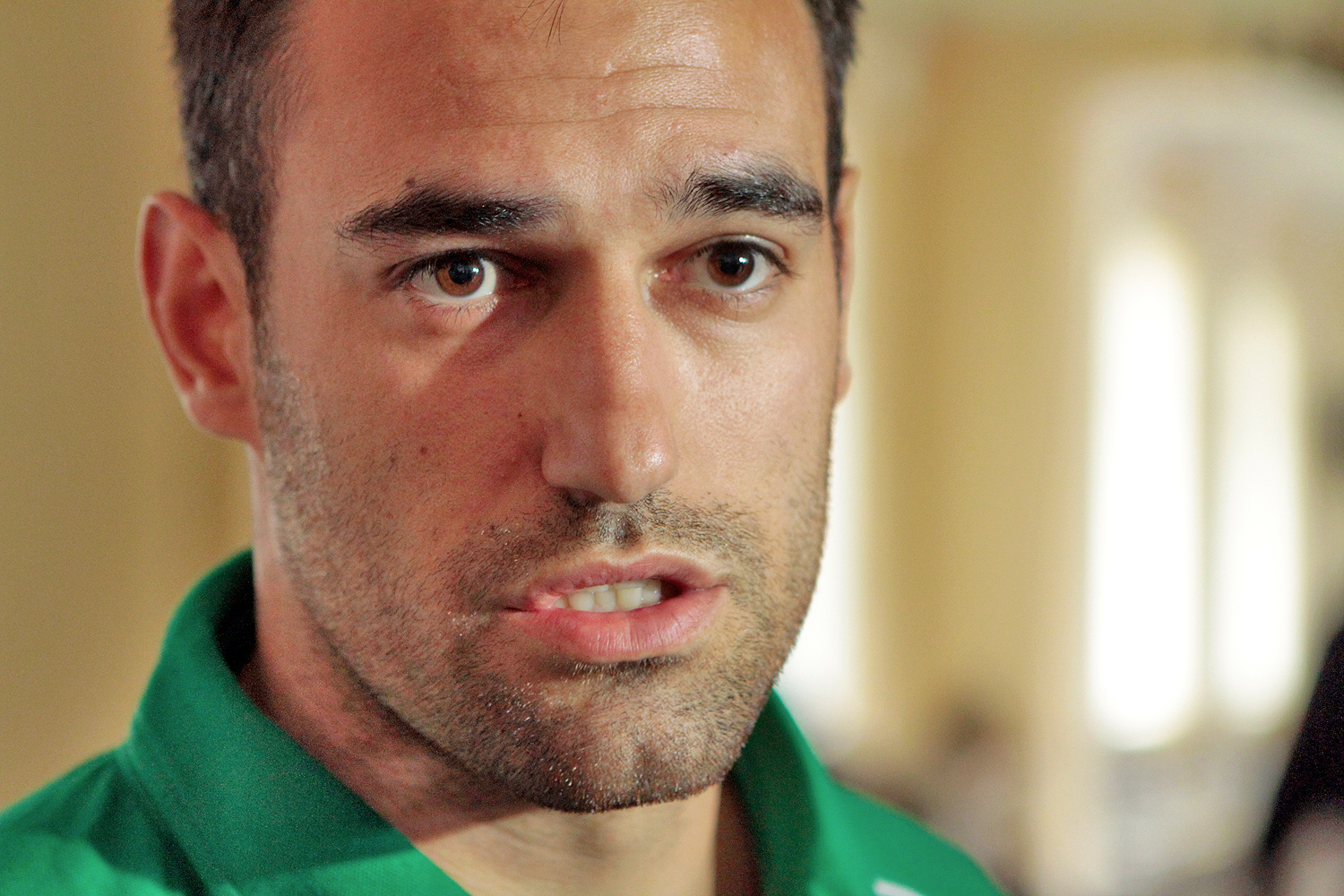
- Popović with Žalgiris in 2011

Zenit Saint Petersburg
- Title: Sporting director
- League: VTB United League; EuroLeague

Personal information
- Born: 12 June 1982 (age 44) Zadar, SR Croatia, SFR Yugoslavia
- Listed height: 6 ft 1 in (1.85 m)
- Listed weight: 190 lb (86 kg)

Career information
- College: College of Southern Idaho (2000–2001)
- NBA draft: 2004: undrafted
- Playing career: 1998–2019
- Position: Point guard / shooting guard

Career history
- 1998–2003: Zadar
- 2003–2004: Valencia
- 2004–2005: Cibona
- 2005–2006: Efes Pilsen
- 2006–2008: Žalgiris Kaunas
- 2008–2011: UNICS Kazan
- 2011–2013: Žalgiris Kaunas
- 2013–2015: Khimki
- 2015–2019: Fuenlabrada

Career highlights
- As player: FIBA EuroStar (2007); 2× EuroCup champion (2011, 2015); ABA League champion (2003); 2× Baltic League champion (2008, 2012); Croatian League champion (2004); 4× Lithuanian League champion (2007, 2008, 2012, 2013); 2× Croatian Cup winner (2000, 2003); Turkish Cup winner (2006); 3× Lithuanian Cup winner (2007, 2008, 2012); Russian Cup winner (2009); ABA League Final Four MVP (2003); 4× Lithuanian League All-Star (2007, 2008, 2012, 2013); EuroCup Finals MVP (2011); All-Spanish League Second Team (2016)
Medals
Men's basketball
Representing Croatia
European U-18 Championship
Silver medal – second place	2000 Croatia	U-18 Team

Marko Popović (born 12 June 1982) is a Croatian basketball executive and former professional basketball player. Standing at a height of 1.85 m (6 ft 1 in), he played at the point guard and shooting guard positions. He currently serves as a sporting director for Zenit Saint Petersburg of the VTB United League.

== Early life ==
Born in Zadar, Popović is the son of Petar, a retired basketball player and present-day coach. Marko started training in basketball in the youth school of KK Zadar, in 1991, but his family moved to Zagreb in 1994, when his father signed with Benston. Popović then entered the youth system of Cibona, where he remained until 1997, when his family moved back to Zadar. Popović's cadet team won the national championship, and he was voted the MVP of the tournament.

== College career ==
After Popović had a successful 2000 FIBA Europe Under-18 Championship with Croatia's junior national team, KK Zadar decided to offer him a seven-year contract, but he declined the offer, and instead went to an NCAA Division II college basketball team in the United States. He joined the College of Southern Idaho, where he stayed for a year.

== Professional career ==
Popović played with the youth junior squad of KK Zadar in the 1998–99 season, and also played in three games with the club's senior team that season. In the club's youth squad, he scored an average of 25 points per game, which earned him a spot in the top-tier level senior men's team of the club in the following season of 1999–00. After spending a year in the United States, playing college basketball at the College of Southern Idaho (NCAA Division II), he moved back to Zadar, Croatia, in 2001.

In the 2002–03 ABA League season, Zadar surprisingly won the championship, after beating Maccabi Tel Aviv in the finals. Popović played a major role in his team's success, and he was awarded with the MVP title of the leagues' final four tournament, which took place in Ljubljana.

In 2003 he moved to Pamesa Valencia of the Spanish ACB League for the 2003–04 season, where he stayed until February 2004, before moving back to Croatia again, this time to Cibona, with which he won the Croatian League championship in the 2003–04 season.

In 2005 Popović was signed by Turkish League team Efes Pilsen, and the next year, he moved to Žalgiris Kaunas of the Lithuanian League, with which he won both the 2006–07 and 2007–08 Lithuanian league championships. While playing with UNICS Kazan, he was named the Finals MVP of the 2nd-tier level European-wide league, the EuroCup, in 2011.

In 2011 he returned to Žalgiris. After leaving Žalgiris in June 2013, Popović agreed to contract terms with the Russian VTB United League team Khimki Moscow Region, as he signed a two-year deal with the club on 7 August 2013. On 16 June 2015, he left Khimki, after spending two seasons with the club.

On 6 October 2015, he signed with the Spanish team Baloncesto Fuenlabrada. In February 2017, he became the all-time EuroCup scoring leader, but was surpassed by Bojan Dubljević and Rafa Martínez later same season. On 17 July 2018, he resigned with the Spanish club. After spending four seasons with Fuenlabrada, in May 2019 Popović announced he will retire from playing professional basketball at the end of the season.

== National team career ==
Popović played for the Croatian men's junior national teams. With Croatia's under-18 team, he won a silver medal at the 2000 European Championship, which was held in his home town of Zadar. Croatia lost that tournament's gold medal game by one point against the junior national team of France, which was led by Tony Parker. Popović led the tournament in assists, with an average of 5.2 assists per game. He also led the 2002 FIBA Europe Under-20 Championship in both scoring and assists.

Popović joined the senior men's Croatian national team in 2002, and with the senior team, he played at the following EuroBasket tournaments: in 2003, 2005, 2007, 2009, 2011, and finally in 2017. He also played at the 2008 Summer Olympics and at the 2010 World Championship.

== Career statistics ==
Legend
GP	Games played	GS	Games started	MPG	Minutes per game
FG%	Field-goal percentage	3P%	3-point field-goal percentage	FT%	Free-throw percentage
RPG	Rebounds per game	APG	Assists per game	SPG	Steals per game
BPG	Blocks per game	PPG	Points per game	PIR	Performance index rating
**Bold**	Career high

=== EuroLeague ===
Year	Team	GP	GS	MPG	FG%	3P%	FT%	RPG	APG	SPG	BPG	PPG	PIR
2001–02	Zadar	11	4	30.4	.402	.299	.813	1.8	4.0	1.6	.0	13.9	13.1
2003–04	Valencia	17	5	20.0	.363	.339	.767	**2.2**	1.8	1.1	.0	6.8	6.5
2004–05	Cibona	17	**16**	31.8	.449	.386	.733	**2.2**	4.0	**1.9**	.0	**15.4**	**16.2**
2005–06	Efes Pilsen	16	13	24.0	.478	.419	.776	1.4	3.1	1.4	.0	12.9	12.8
2006–07	Žalgiris	7	7	**34.4**	.395	.273	**.909**	.9	**4.9**	1.4	.0	15.1	15.9
2007–08	Žalgiris	20	0	21.5	.432	.396	.839	1.4	2.0	1.0	.0	11.7	10.3
2011–12	Žalgiris	14	1	22.2	.404	.387	.906	2.1	2.1	.4	.0	12.5	11.4
2012–13	Žalgiris	**21**	13	24.0	**.486**	**.439**	.855	1.4	2.2	.7	.0	13.4	12.5
Career		123	59	29.2	.434	.380	.821	1.7	2.8	1.2	.0	12.5	12.0
