= 2013 LKL All-Star Game =

Time Team	Lietuviai
113	140
	1	2	3	4	Total
Time Team	28	19	33	33	113
Lietuviai	37	33	35	35	140
- Date: March 17, 2013
- Venue: Šiauliai Arena, Šiauliai
- MVP: Kšyštof Lavrinovič; Darjuš Lavrinovič

The annual 2013 LKL All-star game, was held in Šiauliai Arena, in Šiauliai, on March 17.

== Teams ==
Lietuviai
Pos.	Player	Team	Total Votes
Starters
PG	(Lithuania) Renaldas Seibutis	Lietuvos Rytas	5,539
SG	(Lithuania) Rimantas Kaukėnas*	Žalgiris	6,600
SF	(Lithuania) Mindaugas Kuzminskas	Žalgiris	6,808
PF	(Lithuania) Paulius Jankūnas	Žalgiris	6,563
C	(Lithuania) Darjuš Lavrinovič	Žalgiris	4,411
Reserves
G	(Lithuania) Gintaras Kadžiulis	Prienai	
SG	(Lithuania) Deividas Gailius	Neptūnas	
SF	(Lithuania) Arnas Butkevičius	Lietkabelis	
SF	(Lithuania) Gediminas Orelikas	Prienai	
PF	(Lithuania) Aurimas Kieža	Šiauliai	
PF	(Lithuania) Mindaugas Katelynas	Lietuvos Rytas	
F/C	(Lithuania) Kšyštof Lavrinovič	Žalgiris	

Time Team
Pos.	Player	Team	Total Votes
Starters
PG	(Croatia) Oliver Lafayette	Žalgiris	3,090
SG	(Croatia) Marko Popović	Žalgiris	6,294
SF	(United States) Tremmell Darden**	Žalgiris	8,157
PF	(Croatia) Mario Delaš	Žalgiris	4,248
C	(United States) Jeff Foote	Žalgiris	4,984
Reserves
PG	(Serbia) Nemanja Nedović	Lietuvos Rytas	
PG	(United States) Darrick Leonard	Juventus	
G	(Puerto Rico) Trévon Hughes	Pieno žvaigždės	
SF	(United States) David McClure	Neptūnas	
SF	(Panama) Tony Bishop	Nevėžis	
PF	(United States) Yancy Gates	Pieno žvaigždės	
C	(Croatia) Tomislav Zubčić	Lietuvos Rytas	

- Rimantas Kaukėnas was replaced by Gytis Sirutavičius, of Pieno žvaigždės, for personal reasons.
- Tremmell Darden was replaced by Chase Simon, of Šiauliai, due to his contract termination with Žalgiris.

== Coaches ==
"Lietuviai" was coached by Lithuanian Virginijus Šeškus, of Prienai, who acquired 4,866 votes. "Time Team" was coached by Spaniard Joan Plaza, of Žalgiris, who acquired 8,672 votes.

== Game ==
Lietuvos Rytas TV

March 17
15:00 CET

Lietuviai 140, Time Team 113
Scoring by quarter: 37–28, 33–19, 35–33, 35–33
Pts: K. Lavrinovič 21; G. Orelikas 16; D. Lavrinovič 15; Rebs: D. Lavrinovič 8 G. Orelikas 5 A. Kieža 4 Asts: A. Kieža 8 D. Lavrinovič 6; 2 players 5	Pts: Y. Gates 22; C. Simon 14; J. Blūms 12; Rebs: T. Hughes 3; 3 players 2; 5 players 1 Asts: N. Nedović 8 D. Leonard 6 M. Delaš 4

Šiauliai Arena, Šiauliai, Lithuania

In the third quarter, singer Donatas Montvydas stepped on the court, wearing a "Lietuviai" jersey. In 5 minutes of action, he scored 6 points, and dished out 2 assists.
