= Evaldas =

Evaldas is a Lithuanian masculine given name. Notable people with the name include:

- Evaldas Petrauskas (born 1992), Lithuanian boxer
- Evaldas Dainys (born 1982), Lithuanian basketball player
- Evaldas Razulis (born 1986), Lithuanian footballer
