= Mantas Ruikis =

Lithuanian basketball player (born 1985)

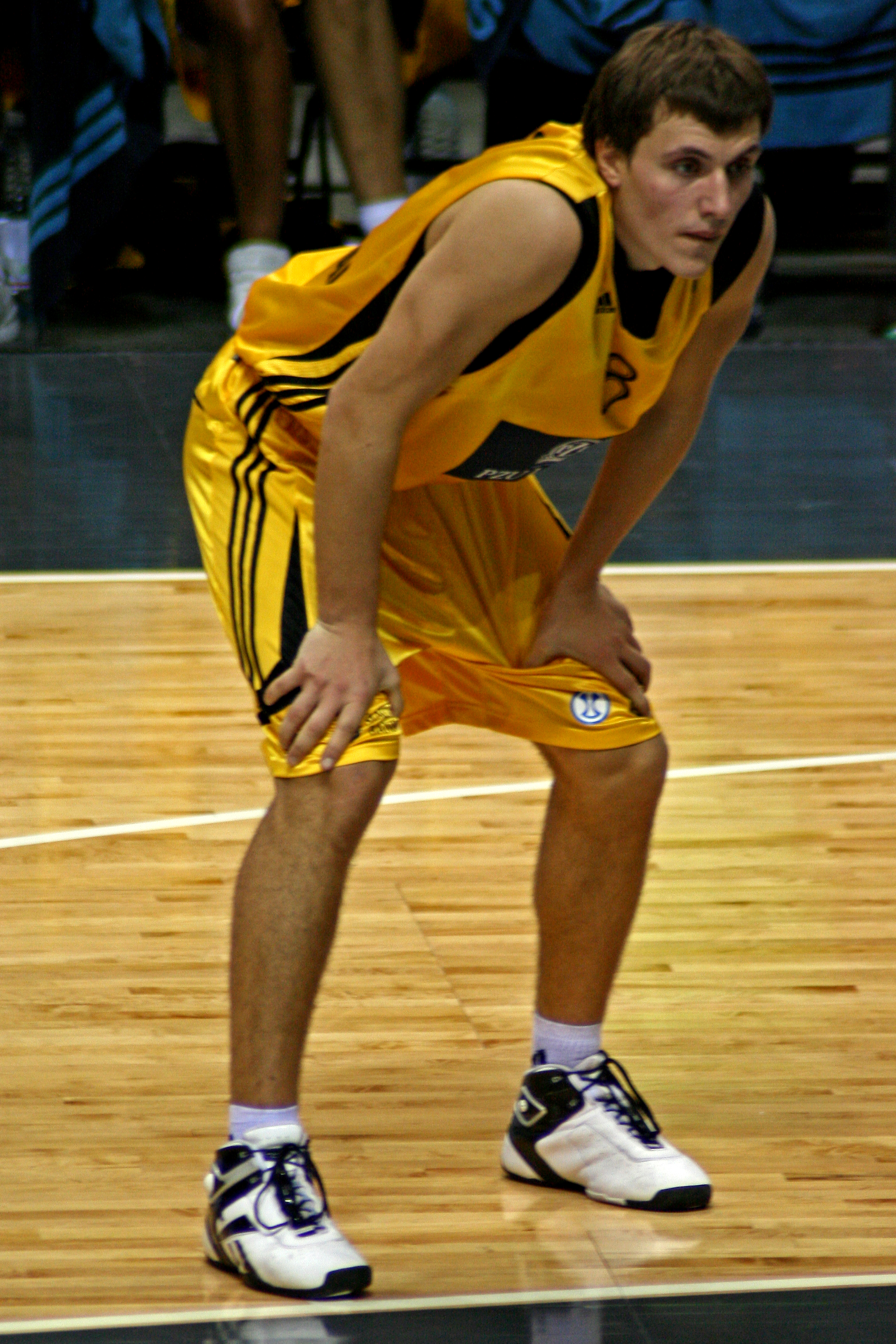

Personal information
- Born: June 28, 1985 (age 41) Klaipėda, Lithuanian SSR, Soviet Union
- Listed height: 6 ft 5 in (1.96 m)
- Listed weight: 211 lb (96 kg)

Career information
- NBA draft: 2007: undrafted
- Playing career: 2001–2025
- Position: Shooting guard / small forward

Career history
- 2001–2005: Neptūnas Klaipėda
- 2005–2008: Šiauliai
- 2008: Valladolid
- 2009: Cáceres 2016
- 2009–2010: Sūduva Marijampolė
- 2010: Denain Voltaire
- 2010–2012: Neptūnas Klaipėda
- 2012–2013: Pieno žvaigždės Pasvalys
- 2013–2016: Saint-Chamond
- 2016–2018: UB Chartres Métropole
- 2018–2019: Stade Rochelais
- 2019–2023: BC Gargždai-SC
- 2023–2024: BC Kretinga
- 2024–2025: Olimpas Palanga

Career highlights
- LSKL champion (2006)
Medals
Men's Basketball
Representing Lithuania
FIBA Europe Under-20 Championship
Silver medal – second place	2005 Russia	National Team

Mantas Ruikis (born June 28, 1985) is a Lithuanian former professional basketball player. He played as a shooting guard.

On 31 August 2005, Ruikis left Neptūnas after playing four seasons with the team. After five seasons, on 12 November 2010, he returned to Neptūnas.

== Achievements ==
- 2005 year: U-20 European championship vice champion
- 2006 year: Baltic Basketball League Bronze medal
- 2006 year: LSKL Champion
- 2007 year: LKL three point shoot-out vice champion
- 2006, 2007, 2008 years: LKL Bronze medal
