= Povilas Čukinas =

Lithuanian basketball player

Personal information
- Born: 11 April 1983 (age 43) Trakai, Lithuanian SSR, Soviet Union
- Listed height: 6 ft 10.75 in (2.10 m)
- Listed weight: 254 lb (115 kg)

Career information
- Playing career: 2000–2020
- Position: Center

Career history
- 2000–2001: Punktukas Anykščiai
- 2001–2002: Alita Alytus
- 2002–2008: Lietuvos rytas
- 2006–2007: →MHP Riesen Ludwigsburg
- 2007–2008: →Pallacanestro Cantù
- 2008–2009: BK Barons
- 2009–2011: Žalgiris Kaunas
- 2010–2011: →BC Kaunas
- 2011–2012: Walter Tigers Tübingen
- 2012: Rūdupis Prienai
- 2012: BC Roche Vendée
- 2012–2013: Sanaye Petrochimi Mahshahr
- 2013–2014: Starwings Basel
- 2014–2015: Jēkabpils
- 2015–2016: Samen Mashhad BC
- 2016–2017: Chemidor Tehran
- 2017: Étoile Sportive du Sahel
- 2017–2018: BC Dzūkija
- 2018-2020: Lanciano Basket

Career highlights
- 2005: ULEB Eurocup champion; 2006: BBL champion; 2006: LKL champion

Povilas Čukinas (born 11 April 1983) is a former Lithuanian professional basketball player.

== Professional career ==
Born in Trakai, Čukinas started his career in LKAL's Puntukas Anykščiai. He moved to Alita Alytus of LKL. Although the player's statistics were not impressive (he averaged 3.8 points per game for Alita), then-LKL champion BC Lietuvos Rytas signed a long-term contract with the young forward. Čukinas played for Lietuvos Rytas for four consecutive years, but was used sparingly. His best season was the 2003–04 season, when Čukinas averaged 10.7 points per game.

During the 2006–07 season, Čukinas was loaned to Bundesliga's EnBW Ludwigsburg. He became one of the key players there. Later, he was invited to play for Serie A's Tisettanta Cantù.

On 24 September 2008 Barons LMT invited Čukinas into the team but he was waived only after a month of playing. Čukinas finished the season with BC Budivelnyk. On 25 August 2009 he signed a one-year contract with Žalgiris Kaunas.

On 17 September 2010 he was loaned to Aisčiai Kaunas. On 1 November 2011 he signed a one-year contract with Walter Tigers Tübingen. Since 9 October 2012 he has been playing for BC Prienai. In 2012, he signed with Sanaye Petrochimi Mahshahr BC.
