= Rimantas Grigas =

Lithuanian basketball coach (born 1962)

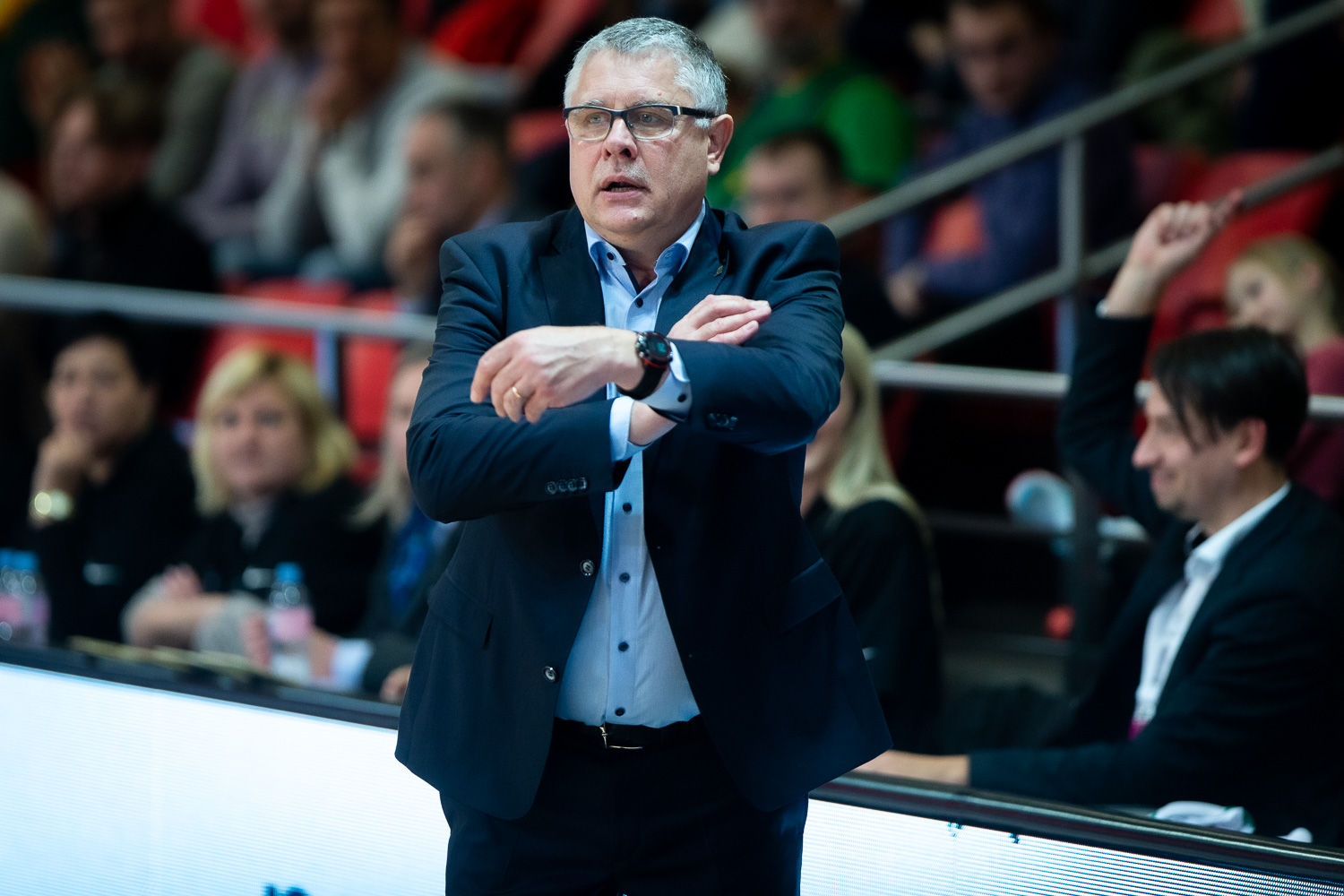
Rimantas Grigas in 2022

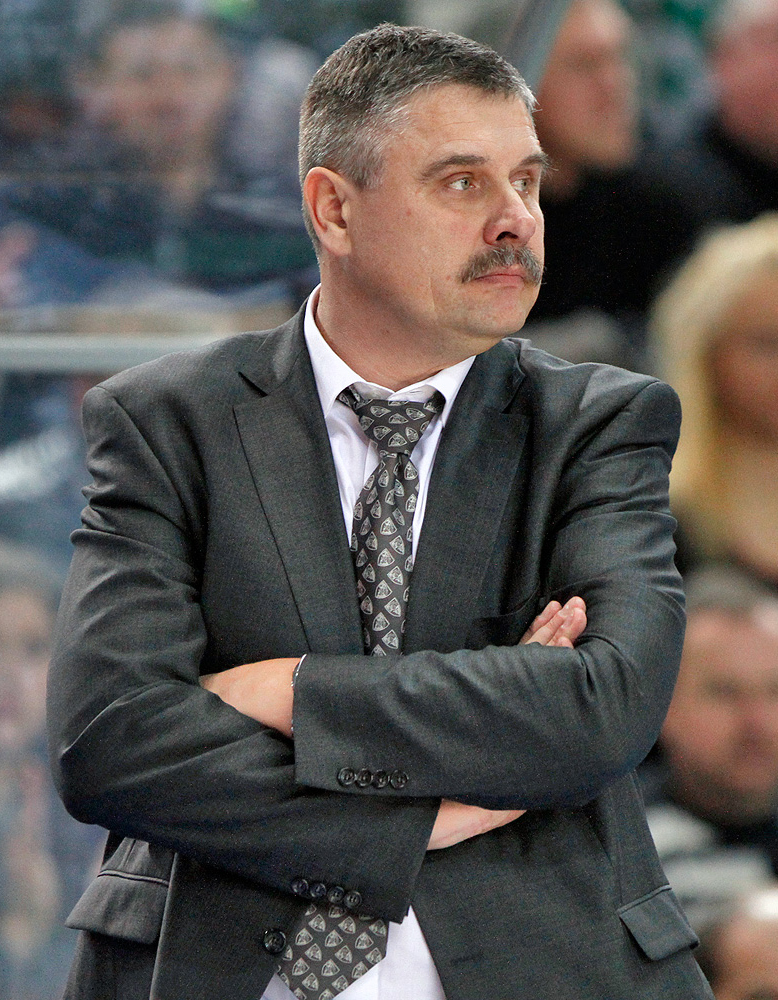
Rimantas Grigas in 2010

Rimantas Grigas (born 1962, Klaipėda) is a Lithuanian basketball coach, known for his stint with Žalgiris Kaunas.

He was coaching Atletas Kaunas in the 1996–1999 season. Before entering Žalgiris Kaunas coach staff, he was signed with Žalgiris stand-in. Before the resignation of previous head coach Ainars Bagatskis, he was his assistant. He was also head coach of BC Budivelnyk, and assumed the Belarus women's national basketball team in 2012, qualifying them for two EuroBasket Women and the 2014 FIBA World Championship for Women before leaving in 2014. In 2013 he became head coach of BC Pieno žvaigždės, helping BC Pieno žvaigždės reach 5th place in the LKL in his lone season. He is the current head coach of the U18 Lithuanian national basketball team. He also worked with BC Tsmoki-Minsk. He briefly returned to coaching BC Pieno žvaigždės in 2017, but was shockingly forced resigned in December. He became head coach of NKL side BC Jonava in December, 2018.

== Achievements ==
First his win with BC Žalgiris was Lithuanian Basketball Federation Cup, was won on 2007 February 7. In 2007 May 22 team has won Lithuanian Basketball League gold medals. In his second season, he won the second consecutive LKF Cup and the LKL championship.
