= Oliver Lafayette =

American-Croatian basketball player

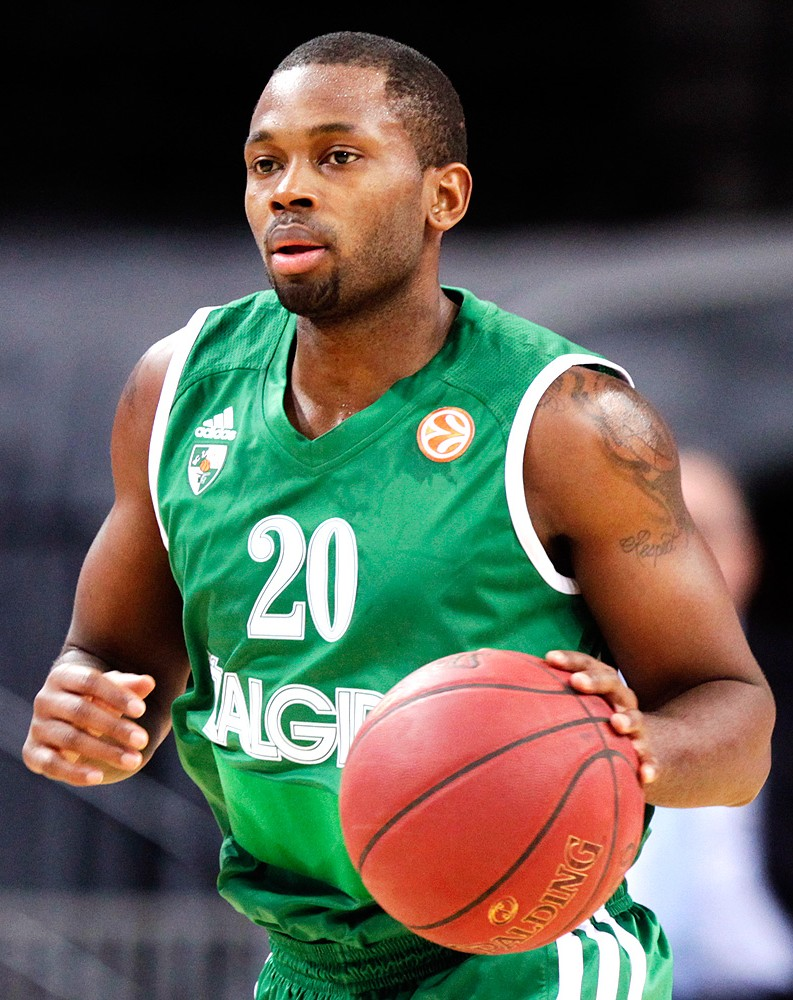
- Lafayette with Žalgiris Kaunas in 2013

Personal information
- Born: May 6, 1984 (age 42) Baton Rouge, Louisiana, U.S.
- Listed height: 6 ft 2 in (1.88 m)
- Listed weight: 190 lb (86 kg)

Career information
- High school: Capitol (Baton Rouge, Louisiana)
- College: Blinn (2002–2003); Brown Mackie (2004–2005); Houston (2005–2007)
- NBA draft: 2007: undrafted
- Playing career: 2007–2019
- Position: Point guard / shooting guard
- Number: 0, 20

Career history
- 2007–2008: Correcaminos UAT Victoria
- 2008–2009: Erie BayHawks
- 2009–2010: Fort Wayne Mad Ants
- 2010: Boston Celtics
- 2010: Partizan Belgrade
- 2010–2011: Fort Wayne Mad Ants
- 2011: Maccabi Ashdod
- 2011–2012: Asseco Prokom Gdynia
- 2012: Anadolu Efes Istanbul
- 2012–2013: Žalgiris Kaunas
- 2013–2014: Valencia Basket
- 2014–2015: Olympiacos
- 2015–2016: EA7 Emporio Armani Milano
- 2016–2017: Unicaja
- 2017–2018: Virtus Bologna
- 2018–2019: Igokea

Career highlights
- 2× EuroCup champion (2014, 2017); Lithuanian League champion (2013); Greek League champion (2015); Italian Cup winner (2016); Bosnian Cup winner (2019); Lithuanian League All-Star (2013); 2× Second-team All-Conference USA (2006, 2007)
- Stats at NBA.com
- Stats at Basketball Reference

Oliver Lafayette (born May 6, 1984) is an American-born Croatian former professional basketball player. Standing at 6 ft 2 in (1.88 m), he played at the point guard and shooting guard positions. A two-time EuroCup winner, Lafayette has also won the national championships in Greece and Lithuania.

== High school and college career ==
Lafayette attended Capitol High School in Baton Rouge, Louisiana and led the basketball team to a 29–3 record his senior year. Lafayette attended first Blinn College and Brown Mackie College before transferring to the University of Houston. At Houston during his junior year, Lafayette started 30 of 31 games and earned 2nd team all Conference USA while finishing third in scoring in C-USA with a 15.7 points per game average. During his senior year in 2006–07, Lafayette averaged 14.3 points, 5.9 rebounds and 3.1 assists per game. He also majored in sociology.

== Professional career ==
Lafayette talks to Press in his presentation as a Valencia BC player.

Lafayette played with the Fort Wayne Mad Ants during the 2009–10 season in the NBA Development League. With the Mad Ants, the guard started 42 of 48 games and averaged 17.1 points, 6.5 assists and 1.8 steals in 35.3 minutes per game. On April 14, 2010, Lafayette signed with the Boston Celtics of the National Basketball Association and appeared in one game with the team in which he scored 7 points. Upon playing with the Celtics, Lafayette became the 23rd former Houston Cougar to play in the NBA.

On October 13, 2010, Lafayette signed with Partizan Belgrade in Serbia, but the contract was terminated in November.

In December 2010, Lafayette practiced with the Fort Wayne Mad Ants, his former team. He was going to sign with the Mad Ants once he was officially released from Partizan Belgrade. After averaging 16.4 points per game with the Mad Ants, he signed a four-month contract with the Turkish team Beşiktaş. But due to health problems, his contract was dropped.

In February 2011, Lafayette signed with Maccabi Ashdod in Israel. On October 5, 2011, he signed a one-year contract with Asseco Prokom Gdynia in Poland.

In January 2012, Lafayette signed with Anadolu Efes Istanbul for the remainder of the 2011–12 season. Later that year, he joined Žalgiris Kaunas. He signed with Valencia Basket in the offseason in 2013.

On June 22, 2014, he signed a two-year deal with Olympiacos Piraeus. On June 29, 2015, he parted ways with Olympiacos.

On July 9, 2015, he signed with the Italian club Emporio Armani Milano.

On July 18, 2016, Lafayette signed with Spanish team Unicaja. In April 2017, Lafayette won his second EuroCup with Unicaja after beating Valencia BC in the Finals.

On July 31, 2017, Lafayette signed with Italian club Virtus Bologna.

On November 13, 2018, Lafayette signed with Bosnian club Igokea.

== International career ==
The Croatian Basketball Federation asked for permission to give Oliver Lafayette a Croatian citizenship for sports interest, which the Croatian Olympic Committee approved. Lafayette was awarded with a Croatian passport and represented Croatia at the 2014 FIBA Basketball World Cup.

== Overseas Elite ==
In the summer of 2017, Lafayette joined two-time The Basketball Tournament defending champion Overseas Elite. On August 3, 2017, Blair's team, Overseas Elite won its third straight The Basketball Tournament championship with an 86–83 victory over Team Challenge ALS on ESPN.

== Career statistics ==
Legend
GP	Games played	GS	Games started	MPG	Minutes per game
FG%	Field-goal percentage	3P%	3-point field-goal percentage	FT%	Free-throw percentage
RPG	Rebounds per game	APG	Assists per game	SPG	Steals per game
BPG	Blocks per game	PPG	Points per game	PIR	Performance index rating
**Bold**	Career high

=== NBA ===
==== Regular season ====
Year	Team	GP	GS	MPG	FG%	3P%	FT%	RPG	APG	SPG	BPG	PPG
2009–10	Boston	1	0	22.0	.500	.500	.000	4.0	2.0	.0	.0	7.0
Career		1	0	22.0	.500	.500	.000	4.0	2.0	.0	.0	7.0

=== Euroleague ===
Year	Team	GP	GS	MPG	FG%	3P%	FT%	RPG	APG	SPG	BPG	PPG	PIR
2010–11	Partizan Belgrade	6	3	**25.8**	.221	.154	.654	**3.7**	**3.3**	1.3	.0	8.5	6.3
2011–12	Asseco Prokom	10	0	24.5	.411	.381	.708	2.5	**3.3**	1.4	.0	**10.7**	11.0
2011–12	Anadolu Efes	6	2	23.0	**.419**	.313	**.917**	3.2	2.8	**1.5**	.0	8.7	**11.7**
2012–13	Zalgiris	23	**11**	21.2	.361	.323	.900	2.1	2.8	.9	.0	7.9	7.3
2014–15	Olympiacos	**29**	1	18.3	.386	**.404**	.606	2.1	2.6	.5	.0	6.8	6.9
2015–16	Milano	10	3	22.5	.435	.259	.846	2.0	2.1	1	.2	7.3	5.4
Career		74	17	21.1	.364	.346	.736	2.4	2.8	.9	.0	7.9	8.0

=== Domestic leagues ===
Season	Team	League	GP	MPG	FG%	3P%	FT%	RPG	APG	SPG	BPG	PPG
2007–08	Correcaminos UAT Victoria	Mexico LNPB	36	33.2	.458	.337	.745	4.8	5.1	2.3	.2	16.1
2008–09	Correcaminos UAT Victoria	Mexico LNPB	8	39.1	.622	.362	.738	6.0	6.3	3.3	.0	23.3
2008–09	Erie Bayhawks	D-League	37	31.4	.437	.320	.774	4.2	3.9	1.7	.2	13.6
2009–10	Fort Wayne Mad Ants	D-League	48	35.3	.471	.381	.798	4.6	6.5	1.8	.1	17.1
2010–11	Partizan NiS	Serbian KLS	6	23.3	.433	.278	.769	4.0	4.2	2.2	.0	10.2
2010–11	Fort Wayne Mad Ants	D-League	21	33.6	.421	.302	.857	4.2	3.6	2.0	.1	16.4
2010–11	Maccabi Ashdod B.C.	Ligat HaAl	11	22.4	.407	.447	.630	2.1	2.9	1.5	.0	10.5
2011–12	Asseco Prokom Gdynia	VTB United League	10	22.6	.370	.161	.652	2.8	3.3	1.0	.0	7.0
2011–12	Anadolu Efes S.K.	TBL	24	21.5	.462	.250	.938	2.5	2.5	1.0	.0	7.5
2012–13	BC Žalgiris	Lithuania LKL	16	17.0	.429	.479	.730	2.1	3.2	.9	.1	7.9
2012–13	BC Žalgiris	VTB United League	26	22.8	.424	.311	.814	2.5	3.5	1.3	.0	8.3
2013–14	Valencia BC	Liga ACB	40	21.6	.403	.325	.812	2.1	4.5	1.1	.0	7.9
2014–15	Olympiacos B.C.	Greek A1	31	17.6	.508	.357	.760	1.6	2.8	.8	.0	6.5

== See also ==
- List of foreign basketball players in Serbia
