= Gintaras Leonavičius =

Lithuanian basketball player

Personal information
- Born: October 29, 1983 (age 43) Panevėžys, then part of Lithuanian SSR, Soviet Union
- Listed height: 6 ft 4.5 in (1.94 m)
- Listed weight: 185 lb (84 kg)

Career information
- Playing career: 2002–2019
- Position: Shooting guard

Career history
- 2002–2003: Preventa-Malsena Panevėžys
- 2003–2004: Pieno žvaigždės Pasvalys
- 2004–2007: Akademija-MRU Vilnius
- 2007–2009: Nevėžis Kėdainiai
- 2009–2010: Sakalai Vilnius
- 2010: Mazzeo San Severo
- 2010–2011: Techasas Panevėžys
- 2011–2012: CB Peñas Huesca
- 2012–2013: CB Breogán
- 2013–2014: Nevėžis Kėdainiai
- 2014–2016: BC Šiauliai
- 2016–2018: Lietkabelis Panevėžys
- 2018–2019: Skycop Prienai

Career highlights
- NKL champion (2006); 2× BBL champion (2015, 2016); BBL Finals MVP (2015)

Gintaras Leonavičius (born October 29, 1983) is a Lithuanian former professional basketball player, playing as a shooting guard. Born in Panevėžys, he is 6 ft 4.5 in (1.94 m) in height and he weighs 185 lb (84 kg).
