= Erfan Nasajpour =

Iranian-Canadian basketball player

Personal information
- Born: March 21, 1984 (age 42)
- Listed height: 5 ft 10 in (1.78 m)
- Listed weight: 165 lb (75 kg)

Career information
- High school: Daniel McIntyre Collegiate Institute (Winnipeg, Manitoba)
- College: University of Winnipeg (2004–2008)
- NBA draft: 2008: undrafted
- Playing career: 2008–2018
- Position: Point guard

Career history
- 2008-2010: Zob Ahan Isfahan
- 2010-2015: Petrochimi Bandar Imam
- 2015-2016: Samen Mashhad
- 2016-2018: Shahrdari Tabriz

Erfan Nasajpour (Persian: عرفان نساجپور, born 21 March 1984) is an Iranian-Canadian retired professional basketball player. He played his whole career in the Iranian Basketball Super League.

== Early life ==
Nasajpour was born in Iran and immigrated with his family to Winnipeg, Manitoba in 1991. He attended high school at Daniel McIntyre Collegiate Institute, and was captain for the University of Winnipeg in U Sports.

== Career ==
- (Canada) University of Winnipeg (U Sports) - 2004–2008
- (Iran) Zob Ahan Isfahan (ISL) - 2008–2010
- (Iran) Petrochimi Bandar Imam (ISL) - 2010–2015
- (Iran) Samen Mashhad (ISL) - 2015–2016
- (Iran) Shahrdari Tabriz (ISL) - 2016–2018

== Honours ==
- 2002 Canadian U18 National Team
- 2003 Global Games U18 in Dallas
- 2005 Canadian University National Team in Izmir Turkey
- 2004/05 All-CanWest 1st Team
- 2005/06 All-CanWest 2nd Team
- 2006/07 2nd Team All-Canadian
- 2007/08 2nd Team All-Canadian
