= Samen Mashhad BC =

Samen Mashhad
- Leagues: Iranian Super League
- Founded: 2011
- Arena: Shahid Beheshti Sport Complex
- Location: Mashhad, Iran
- Team colors: Red and White
- Head coach: (Iran) Mehdi Sahebian
- Championships: (1) Tarh Maskan Samen Tournament
- Website: www.samenclub.com/
Home	Away

Samen Mashhad Basketball Club is an Iranian professional basketball club based in Mashhad, Iran. It competes in the Iranian Basketball Super League.

== History ==
Samen was founded in 2011 and is owned by Tarh Maskan Samen, a housing investment company. Samen initially played in the Khorasan Razavi Basketball League then played in the Iranian Second and First Divisions and, in 2014, was promoted to the Iranian Basketball Super League.

== Tournament records ==
=== Khorasan Razavi Basketball League ===
- 2011: 4th place

=== Tarh Maskan Samen Basketball Tournament ===
- 2012: Champions

=== Iranian Basketball Second Division ===
- 2011–12: 6th place
- 2012–13: 4th place

=== Iranian Basketball First Division ===
- 2013–14: 3rd place

=== Iranian Super League ===
- 2014–15: ?
- 2015–16: 5th place

== Roster ==
Number	Player	Position	Height (m)
4	(Iran) Ramin Honarmand	PG	1.75
5	(Iran) Mohammad Khaleghifar	SF	2.03
6	(Iran) Vahid Norouzi	SG	?
7	(Iran) Edris Omrani	SG	?
8	(Iran) Arash Najafi	SG	?
13	(Iran) Ali Jamshidi	SF	1.96
14	(Iran) Mehrdad Soltani	PG	?
15	(Iran) Ali Doraghi	C	2.10
16	(Iran) Nima Bakhshi	C	1.98
21	(Iran) Shahab Reyhani	PF	2.10

Position	Name
Head coach	(Iran) Mehdi Sahebian
Assistant coach	(Iran) Ali Jalalian
Director	(Iran) ?

== Coaches ==
- (Iran) Mehdi Sahebian (2014–2015)
- (Iran) Mehran Hatami (2015–2016)
- (Iran) Mehdi Sahebian (2016-)

== Notable former players ==
- (Lithuania) Povilas Cukinas
- (Iran) Saleh Foroutannik
- (Iran) Arsalan Kazemi
- (Iran) Erfan Nasajpour
