= Aurimas Kieža =

Lithuanian basketball player (born 1982)

Personal information
- Born: 25 October 1982 (age 44) Kapsukas, Lithuanian SSR
- Listed height: 6 ft 8 in (2.03 m)
- Listed weight: 224 lb (102 kg)

Career information
- High school: Florida Air Academy (Melbourne, Florida)
- College: Hofstra (2002–2006)
- NBA draft: 2006: undrafted
- Playing career: 2000–2022
- Position: Power forward

Career history
- 2000–2001: Marijampolės Suvalkija
- 2006–2008: Šiauliai
- 2008–2009: Poltava
- 2009–2010: Sūduva
- 2010: Keravnos
- 2010: Reggiana
- 2010–2011: Juventus
- 2011–2012: Pieno žvaigždės
- 2012–2013: Šiauliai
- 2013–2015: Sigal Prishtina
- 2015–2022: Sūduva

Career highlights
- 2× LKL rebounding leader (2011, 2013); LKL MVP (2011); 2× LKL All-Star (2011, 2013); Kosovo Superleague champion (2014); Kosovo Cup winner (2014); Kosovo Supercup winner (2014); 2× NKL champion (2016–2017)

Aurimas Kieža (born 25 October 1982) is a Lithuanian former professional basketball player.

== College career ==
Kieža played college basketball for the Hofstra Pride from 2002 to 2006. After appearing in 27 games primarily off the bench as a freshman, he earned a starting role during his sophomore season, averaging 10.6 points and a team-high 6.5 rebounds per game. By his senior year in 2005–06, Kieža started all 33 games, averaging 13.1 points and leading the team with 7.7 rebounds per game. He helped guide the Pride to a 26–7 overall record and an appearance in the National Invitation Tournament (NIT) quarterfinals. Over his four-year career at Hofstra, he appeared in 121 games, accumulating 1,180 points and 718 rebounds.

== Professional career ==
After going undrafted in the 2006 NBA draft, Kieža began his professional career by signing with Lietuvos rytas, who subsequently loaned him to BC Šiauliai for the 2006–07 and 2007–08 seasons. He moved abroad in late 2008 to play for BC Poltava in Ukraine, followed by brief stints with Keravnos in Cyprus and Pallacanestro Reggiana in Italy in 2010.

On 4 September 2010, Kieža signed with Juventus Utena. On 14 April 2011, Kieža was named the Lithuanian Basketball League's regular season MVP, after averaging 15.7 points, 10.5 rebounds, 2.6 assists, and 1.3 blocks (with an efficiency rating of 22.0) per game.

In 2013, Kieža moved to the Kosovo Basketball Superleague and signed with Sigal Prishtina. He spent two seasons with the club, winning the Kosovar Cup and the domestic championship title in 2014. He returned to his hometown team, BC Sūduva Marijampolė, in 2015 where he played out the remainder of his professional career until 2022.
