= Šarūnas Vasiliauskas =

Lithuanian basketball player (born 1989)

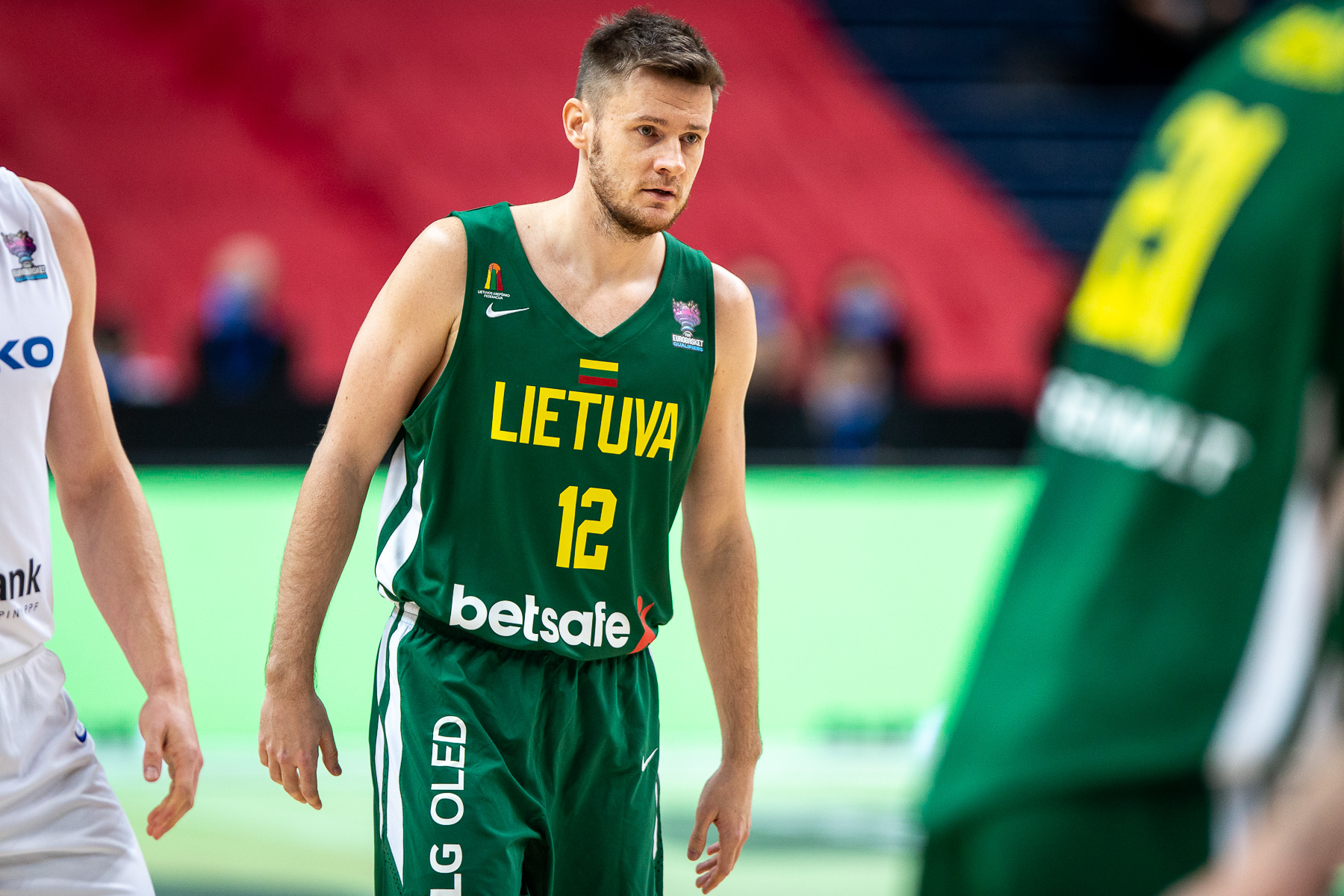
- Vasiliauskas with Trabzonspor in 2018

Jonava Hipocredit
- Title: Director of basketball operations

Personal information
- Born: 27 March 1989 (age 37) Kaunas, Lithuania
- Listed height: 6 ft 2 in (1.88 m)
- Listed weight: 172 lb (78 kg)

Career information
- NBA draft: 2011: undrafted
- Playing career: 2008–present
- Position: Point guard
- Number: 7, 12

Career history
- 2006–2012: Žalgiris Kaunas
- 2006–2008: →Žalgiris-Arvydas Sabonis school
- 2008: →Kaunas Triobet
- 2010–2011: →Aisčiai
- 2011–2012: →Lietkabelis Panevėžys
- 2012: Ruskon-Mordovia Saransk
- 2012–2013: Pieno žvaigždės
- 2013–2015: Trefl Sopot
- 2015–2016: Vytautas Prienai–Birštonas
- 2016: Joventut
- 2016–2017: Uşak Sportif
- 2017–2018: Trabzonspor
- 2018–2020: Gaziantep
- 2020–2021: Petkim Spor
- 2021–2022: CSO Voluntari
- 2022: Scarborough Shooting Stars
- 2022–2023: BC Budivelnyk
- 2023: Scarborough Shooting Stars
- 2023-present: BC Omega-Tauras-LSU

Career highlights
- Romanian Cup winner (2022); BSL assists leader (2018); Polish Supercup MVP (2013); Polish Supercup winner (2013)
Medals
Men's basketball
Representing Lithuania
FIBA Europe Under-20 Championship
Silver medal – second place	2008 Latvia	Under-20

Šarūnas Vasiliauskas (born 27 March 1989) is a Lithuanian professional basketball player for BC Omega-Tauras-LSU of the Lithuanian National Basketball League. He is also the current director of basketball operations for the Lithuanian Basketball League team Jonava Hipocredit.

== Professional career ==
On 8 August 2016, Vasiliauskas signed with Joventut Badalona. On 14 December 2016, he parted ways with Joventut after averaging 5.3 points in Liga ACB. The next day, he signed with Turkish club Uşak Sportif for the rest of the season.

On 19 July 2017, he signed with Turkish club Trabzonspor of the Basketbol Süper Ligi (BSL).

On 28 June 2018, he signed with Gaziantep of the Basketbol Süper Ligi (BSL).

On 18 July 2020, he has signed with Petkim Spor of the Turkish Basketball Super League.

On 22 July 2021, he has signed with CSO Voluntari of the Liga Națională.

On 7 June 2022, Vasiliauskas signed with the Scarborough Shooting Stars of the CEBL.

On 25 July 2023, Vasiliauskas announced his retirement. However, Vasiliauskas decided to continue his career with Lithuanian third-tier side BC Omega-Tauras-LSU.
