= Gytis Sirutavičius =

Lithuanian basketball player (born 1983)

BC Telšiai
- Position: Shooting guard / small forward
- League: National Basketball League

Personal information
- Born: 12 January 1983 (age 43) Panevėžys, Lithuania
- Listed height: 6 ft 5 in (1.96 m)
- Listed weight: 189 lb (86 kg)

Career information
- Playing career: 2000–present

Career history
- 2000–2002: Preventa-Malsena Panevėžys
- 2002–2003: Lithuanian University of Educational Sciences
- 2003–2004: Pieno žvaigždės Pasvalys
- 2005: BC Panevėžys
- 2005–2007: Nevėžis Kėdainiai
- 2007–2008: Sūduva-Arvi Marijampolė
- 2008–2009: BC Poltava
- 2009: Techasas Panevėžys
- 2009-2010: Wamsler SE
- 2010-2011: BC Mures
- 2011: Dnipro
- 2012: Pieno žvaigždės Pasvalys
- 2012: Lietkabelis Panevėžys
- 2012: Nevėžis Kėdainiai
- 2012-2013: Pieno žvaigždės Pasvalys
- 2013-2014: Barsy Atyrau
- 2014-2015: Pieno žvaigždės Pasvalys
- 2015–2016: Vytautas Prienai-Birštonas
- 2016–2017: Juventus Utena
- 2017–2018: ALM Évreux Basket
- 2018-2019: Pieno žvaigždės Pasvalys
- 2019: Betsafe/Liepāja
- 2019-present: BC Telšiai

Career highlights
- LKL Three-point Shootout Champion (2007)

Gytis Sirutavičius (born 12 January 1983) is a Lithuanian professional basketball player.
