= Rolandas Alijevas =

Lithuanian basketball player

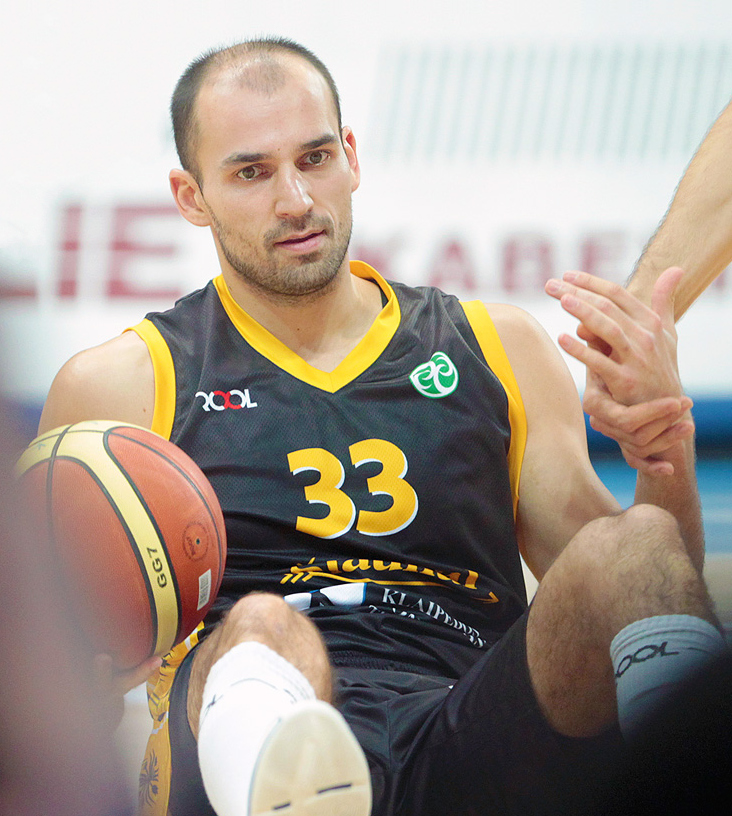
- Alijevas with Šiauliai in 2015

Personal information
- Born: 20 January 1985 (age 41) Kaunas, Lithuania
- Listed height: 6 ft 4 in (1.93 m)
- Listed weight: 193.6 lb (88 kg)

Career information
- NBA draft: 2007: undrafted
- Playing career: 2002–present
- Position: Point guard / shooting guard

Career history
- 2002–2003: Žalgiris Kaunas
- 2003–2004: ASVEL Basket
- 2004–2006: BC Boncourt
- 2006–2007: Polonia Warbud Warszawa
- 2007–2008: CSK VVS Samara
- 2008: Žalgiris Kaunas
- 2008–2009: KK Krka
- 2009: A.E.L. 1964
- 2009–2010: Olympia Larissa
- 2010: BC Nevėžis
- 2010: Phoenix Hagen
- 2010–2011: BC Nevėžis
- 2011: BC Rūdupis
- 2011–2012: Budivelnyk Kyiv
- 2012: Krasnye Krylia
- 2012–2013: BC Šiauliai
- 2013–2014: Pieno žvaigždės
- 2014–2015: BC Šiauliai
- 2015–2016: Juventus Utena
- 2017: Azad University Tehran
- 2018–present: Atletas Kaunas

Career highlights
- 2× Lithuanian League assists leader (2011, 2016)
Medals
Men's basketball
Representing Lithuania
FIBA Under-21 World Championship
Gold medal – first place	2005 Argentina	National Team
FIBA Europe Under-20 Championship
Silver medal – second place	2005 Russia	National Team
Summer Universiade
Gold medal – first place	2007 Thailand	National Team

Rolandas Alijevas (born 20 January 1985) is a Lithuanian professional basketball player of Azeri descent.

== Pro career ==
On 15 April 2011, Alijevas signed a contract with BC Prienai, until the end of the season.

On 28 June 2011, he signed with Budivelnyk Kyiv in Ukraine. On 13 February 2012, he became a member of the Krasnye Krylia basketball club, based in Samara, Russia. He also played for BC Nevėžis, BC Žalgiris, ASVEL Basket, BC Krka, BC Boncourt, Polonia Warszawa, G.S. Olympia Larissa B.C., Phoenix Hagen, BC Šiauliai.

== Achievements ==
- Nike International Junior Tournament MVP: (2003)
- LKAL Champion: (2003)
- FIBA Europe Under-20 Championship Silver: (2005)
- FIBA Under-21 World Championship Gold: (2005)
- Summer Universiade Gold: (2007)
