= Trévon Hughes =

Basketball player

Personal information
- Born: April 4, 1987 (age 39) Queens, New York, U.S.
- Listed height: 6 ft 0 in (1.83 m)
- Listed weight: 195 lb (88 kg)

Career information
- High school: St. John's Northwestern Military Academy (Delafield, Wisconsin)
- College: Wisconsin (2006–2010)
- NBA draft: 2010: undrafted
- Playing career: 2010–2021
- Position: Point guard / shooting guard

Career history
- 2011: VEF Rīga
- 2011–2013: Pieno žvaigždės
- 2013–2014: TBB Trier
- 2014–2015: Medi Bayreuth
- 2015: Sakarya BB
- 2015–2016: Cholet Basket
- 2016–2017: Düzce Belediyesi
- 2017–2018: Pieno žvaigždės
- 2018–2019: Saigon Heat
- 2019–2020: Maccabi Hod HaSharon
- 2020: Hapoel Afula B.C.
- 2020–2021: Elitzur Yavne B.C.

Career highlights
- Latvian Basketball League champion (2011); LKL All-Star (2013); 2× Lithuanian League steals leader (2013, 2018); Second-team All-Big Ten (2010); Big Ten All-Defensive team (2010)

Trévon Hughes (born April 4, 1987) is a retired American-Puerto Rican professional basketball player who last played for Elitzur Yavne B.C. of the Israeli National League. Hughes went to high school in Delafield, Wisconsin at St. John's Northwestern Military Academy. He is currently the head coach for the Kettle Moraine High School boys basketball team.

== High school ==
In high school at St. John's Northwestern Military Academy, Trevon was a first-team all-state selection by the Associated Press as a senior, second-team all-state selection as a junior and honorable mention all-state as a sophomore. He led St. John's Northwestern to its first WIAA state boys basketball tournament berth during the 2005–2006 season. He was named the Midwest Classic Conference Player of the Year for four consecutive seasons. Hughes averaged 22.2 points, 5.9 rebounds, 5.7 assists and 4.8 steals per game as a senior, averaged 22 points, seven rebounds and eight assists as a junior and averaged 20.2 points and five assists as a sophomore. Trevon holds the record for most points scored in one game in Lancer basketball history with 44. Trevon was also the starting quarterback for the Lancers and was named the league's offensive player of the year in football his senior season.

== Collegiate career ==
=== 2006–07 ===
Played in 31 of 36 games, averaging 7.7 minutes per game and had a career-high eight points vs. Southern. Trevon had five rebounds, two assists and three steals in a personal-best 18 minutes vs. Marquette. Hughes had seven points and a steal in 11 minutes vs. Gardner-Webb and had a career-high three assists at Ohio State.

=== 2007–08 ===
Started 34 of the 35 games in which he played and finished second on the team in scoring (11.2 avg.) and third in assists (2.5 avg.). Hughes posted a career-high 25 points in two games including his first career start vs. IPFW and later in the NCAA tournament vs. Kansas State. He also led the Badgers and ranked fourth in the Big Ten with 62 steals. Trevon recorded six steals in three different games. Hughes scored in double digits in 18 games led Wisconsin in scoring 11 times and had a 2.2:1 assist-to-turnover ratio over his last 10 games.

=== 2008–09 ===
Hughes hit a pair of game-winning shots, scoring with 0.9 seconds left at Virginia Tech and with two seconds left in OT to beat Florida State in the opening round of the NCAA tournament. He led UW in scoring 11 times and scored in double figures in 12 of 18 Big Ten games. Hughes owned a 1.51 assist-to-TO ratio, which was ninth in the Big Ten and had a season-high six assists (against one turnover) vs. Iowa (2/11). Trevon recorded a 4.0 assist-to-turnover ratio (24 assists, 6 TOs) during the month of December and made 26-of-55 (.473) 3-point attempts at home. He shot .766 from the foul line, which ranked 12th in the conference. Hughes posted five steals vs. Indiana had 25 in UW's last 12 games and led the team with 49 steals. His 1.78 steals per game in Big Ten play ranked fourth. Hughes ranked 16th in the conference in scoring (12.1 ppg) and scored a season-high 22 points against San Diego. Trevon played a career-high 41 minutes against Minnesota. He tied a career-high six rebounds against Green Bay, Penn State and Illinois. He also scored 21 points and pulled down five boards at Indiana.

== College career stats ==
Season Averages	MIN	PTS	REB	AST	STL	FG%	FT%	3P%
2006–07	7.4	1.3	0.9	0.3	0.2	33.3	66.7	33.3
2007–08	30.2	11.2	3.1	2.5	1.8	39.4	68.8	31.4
2008–09	32.3	12.1	3.2	2.8	1.5	38.2	76.6	35.9
2009–10	32.5	15.4	4.6	2.7	1.7	40.5	70.2	39.7

== Professional career ==
Hughes went on to play for the Houston Rockets in the NBA Summer League in 2010.

In 2011, Hughes played for the VEF Riga, a basketball team that plays in the Baltic League. He then spent two seasons with Pieno žvaigždės of Lithuania.

In June 2013, he signed with TBB Trier.

In 2014, he signed with German team Medi Bayreuth, but on January 22, 2015, Hughes and Bayreuth parted ways. He averaged 13.9 points, 4.3 rebounds and 4.3 assists.

On February 10, 2015, he signed with Sakarya Büyükşehir Belediyesi of the Turkish Second Basketball League.

On November 26, 2019, he signed with Maccabi Hod HaSharon of the Israeli National League. On the same day, Hughes recorded 39 points in his debut, while shooting 11-of-21 from the field, along with seven assists in a 91–89 win over Hapoel Haifa.

=== The Basketball Tournament ===
Hughes joined Big X, a team composed primarily of former Big Ten players in The Basketball Tournament 2020. He finished with nine points, three assists and three steals in a 79–74 win over alternate D2 in the first round.

== Coaching career ==
Following his professional playing career, Hughes was named as the head coach of the Kettle Moraine High School boys basketball team on October 1, 2021. He was relieved of his duties in 2023, after leading the school to its first WIAA state tournament appearance.

== See also ==
- 2010 NCAA Men's Basketball All-Americans
