= Bambale Osby =

American basketball player

Personal information
- Born: May 21, 1986 (age 39) Richmond, Virginia, U.S.
- Listed height: 6 ft 8 in (2.03 m)
- Listed weight: 249 lb (113 kg)

Career information
- High school: Benedictine (Richmond, Virginia)
- College: New Mexico (2004–2005); Paris JC (2005–2006); Maryland (2006–2008)
- NBA draft: 2008: undrafted
- Playing career: 2008–2019
- Position: Center

Career history
- 2008–2009: U-Mobitelco Cluj
- 2009: Maccabi Ramat Gan
- 2009–2010: Allianz Swans Gmunden
- 2010–2011: TTÜ/Kalev
- 2011–2012: Aix-Maurienne Savoie
- 2012–2013: Entente Orléanaise 45
- 2013–2014: Kolossos Rodou
- 2014: Šiauliai
- 2014–2015: Socar Petkim
- 2015: Aix-Maurienne Savoie
- 2015: La Unión de Formosa
- 2015: Afyonkarahisar Belediyespor
- 2017–2018: Tallinna Kalev
- 2018: Maccabi Kiryat Motzkin
- 2018-2019: ALM Évreux Basket
- 2019: Golden Eagle Ylli
- 2019: Toros de Aragua

Career highlights
- KML Most Valuable Player (2011)

Bambale Osby (born May 21, 1986) is an American former professional basketball player. He played collegiate for New Mexico and Maryland.

== Professional career ==
In January 2013, he signed with Kolossos Rodou of Greece. In March 2014, he left Kolossos and signed with BC Šiauliai of Lithuania for the rest of the season.

For the 2014–15 season, he signed with Socar Petkim of the Turkish Basketball Second League. After the end of the Turkish season, he signed with his former team Aix-Maurienne Savoie.
