= 2011–12 LKL season =

Lietuvos krepšinio lyga 2011–12
- League: Lietuvos krepšinio lyga
- Sport: Basketball
- Duration: October 4, 2011 – January 14, 2012 (regular season)

Regular season
- Season MVP: (Lithuania) Jonas Valančiūnas
- Finals champions: Žalgiris
- Runners-up: Lietuvos Rytas
- Finals MVP: (Lithuania) Tomas Delininkaitis

LKL seasons
- ← 2010–11 2012–13 →

The 2011–12 Lietuvos krepšinio lyga was the 19th season of the top-tier level professional basketball league of Lithuania, the Lietuvos krepšinio lyga (LKL). The regular season started in October 2011, and ended in January 2012

== Participants ==
- Baltai
- Juventus
- Kėdainiai Triobet
- Lietkabelis
- Lietuvos rytas
- Naglis
- Neptūnas
- Pieno žvaigždės
- Rūdupis
- Sakalai
- Šiauliai
- Žalgiris

== Regular season ==
	Team	Pld	W	L	PF	PA	Qualification
1	Žalgiris	22	21	1	86.1	70.2	Qualified for the semifinals
2	Lietuvos rytas	22	18	4	88.0	67.9	Qualified for the semifinals
3	Šiauliai	22	16	6	84.3	79.7	Qualified for the quarterfinals
4	Rūdupis	22	16	6	83.3	76.0	Qualified for the quarterfinals
5	Pieno žvaigždės	22	13	9	72.7	72.6	Qualified for the quarterfinals
6	Neptūnas	22	10	12	83.5	84.1	Qualified for the quarterfinals
7	Kėdainiai Triobet	22	9	13	75.5	80.2	
8	Baltai	22	9	13	73.6	78.7	
9	Juventus	22	6	16	73.4	82.6	
10	Sakalai	22	5	17	74.6	82.9	
11	Lietkabelis	22	5	17	73.2	81.8	
12	Palanga	22	4	18	73.2	84.7	Relegation playoffs

== Playoffs ==
Quarterfinals
4	Rūdupis	2
5	Pieno žvaigždės	1
3	Šiauliai	2
6	Neptūnas	1

Semifinals
1	Žalgiris	81+89
4	Rūdupis	74+81
2	Lietuvos rytas	65+85
3	Šiauliai	74+67

Finals
1	Žalgiris	3
2	Lietuvos rytas	0
Third place
3	Šiauliai	1
4	Rūdupis	3

== See also ==
- VTB United League 2011–12
- Baltic Basketball League 2011–12
