= Evaldas Dainys =

Lithuanian basketball player

Personal information
- Born: 29 September 1982 (age 44) Kaunas, Lithuanian SSR, Soviet Union
- Listed height: 5 ft 11 in (1.80 m)
- Listed weight: 188 lb (85 kg)

Career information
- College: Central Florida CC (2003–2005)
- Playing career: 2002–2015
- Position: Point guard
- Number: 55

Career history
- 2002–2003: BC Šilutė
- 2005–2009: BC Neptūnas
- 2009–2010: BC Lietuvos Rytas
- 2010–2011: BC Rūdupis
- 2011–2013: BC Neptūnas
- 2014: BC Mažeikiai
- 2014–2015: JAZZ-Diremta Kaunas

Career highlights
- ULEB Cup champion (2009); LKL champion (2009); BBL champion (2009); NKL champion (2014)

Evaldas Dainys (born 29 September 1982) is a Lithuanian professional basketball player.

Dainys joined Neptūnas in 2005, moving to BC Lietuvos Rytas in 2009 and BC Rūdupis in January 2010. In the summer of 2011, he returned to Neptūnas.

== LKL statistics ==
Season Averages
Season	Team	G	PTS	REB	AST	STL	BLK	FG%	3P%	FT%	MIN	TO
2006–07	BC Neptūnas	20	6.0	2.3	3.3	1.3	0.1	.468	.174	.606	21.8	2.0
2007–08	BC Neptūnas	19	6.5	2.6	3.6	0.8	0.1	.441	.350	.636	22.0	2.5
2008–09	BC Neptūnas / BC Lietuvos Rytas	26	5.0	2.3	2.5	1.3	0.0	.494	.219	.675	18.0	1.8
2009–10	BC Lietuvos Rytas / BC Rūdupis	19	6.2	2.2	2.7	1.7	0.1	.441	.308	.667	18.5	2.2
2010–11	BC Rūdupis	24	8.2	2.4	3.5	0.9	0.1	.657	.214	.508	21.3	2.1
Totals:		108	6.4	2.4	3.1	1.2	0.1	.500	.253	.618	20.3	2.1
