= Baltic Basketball League =

International basketball competition

- Sport: Basketball
- Founded: 2004
- Folded: 2018
- No. of teams: 14
- Country: Estonia; Latvia; Lithuania
- Continent: Europe
- Last champions: (Lithuania) Pieno žvaigždės (1st title)
- Most titles: (Lithuania) Žalgiris Kaunas (5 titles)
- Broadcaster: Viasat Sport Baltic
- Website: bbl.net

Baltic Basketball League (BBL) was the Baltic states basketball league founded in 2004. The league mainly focused on teams from the Baltic states, but teams from Sweden, Russia, Kazakhstan, Finland, and Belarus have participated in the Baltic League. After the 2017–18 season, the league announced that it was suspending its operations.

== History ==
For the 2015–16 season, the format of the BBL included a regular season composed by two groups of seven teams that competed in a round-robin competition system, with each team facing their opponent twice. The teams qualified for the eight-finals based on their ranking after the regular season. Out of the five teams who participated in FIBA Europe Cup competition – Ventspils, Juventus, Šiauliai, Tartu Ülikool/Rock and Pieno žvaigždės – the latter three did not qualify for the FIBA Europe Cup playoffs and thus started playing at the start of the BBL playoffs, seeded respectively first, second and third based on last season's results. All play-off games are played in home-and-away series.

Baltic Basketball League also featured a Baltic Basketball League Cup competition before the beginning of the regular season since 2008.

== Teams ==
These are the teams that participated in 2017–18 season:

Group	Team	City, Country	Arena	Head coach
Group A	(Estonia) AVIS Rapla	Rapla, Estonia	Sadolin Sports Hall	(Estonia) Aivar Kuusmaa
Group A	(Estonia) Pärnu Sadam	Pärnu, Estonia	Pärnu Sports Hall	(Estonia) Heiko Rannula
Group A	(Latvia) Betsafe/Liepāja	Liepāja, Latvia	Liepāja Olympic Center	(Latvia) Agris Galvanovskis
Group A	(Latvia) Jūrmala	Jūrmala, Latvia	Jūrmala State Gymnasium	(Latvia) Mārtiņš Gulbis
Group A	(Lithuania) Šiauliai	Šiauliai, Lithuania	Šiauliai Arena	(Lithuania) Antanas Sireika
Group A	(Lithuania) Vytautas	Prienai/Birštonas, Lithuania	Prienai Arena	(Lithuania) Virginijus Šeškus
Group A	(Belarus) Tsmoki-Minsk II	Minsk, Belarus	The team will play away	(Belarus) Rostislav Vergun
Group B	(Estonia) University of Tartu	Tartu, Estonia	University of Tartu Sports Hall	(Estonia) Priit Vene
Group B	(Estonia) TLÜ/Kalev	Tallinn, Estonia	Kalev Sports Hall	(Estonia) Gert Kullamäe
Group B	(Estonia) TTÜ	Tallinn, Estonia	TTÜ Sports Hall	(Estonia) Rait Käbin
Group B	(Latvia) Valmiera/ORDO	Valmiera, Latvia	Vidzeme Olympic Center	(Latvia) Kristaps Valters
Group B	(Latvia) Ogre	Ogre, Latvia	Ogre 1st Secondary School	(Latvia) Arturs Visockis-Rubenis
Group B	(Lithuania) Pieno žvaigždės	Pasvalys, Lithuania	Pieno žvaigždės Arena	(Lithuania) Gediminas Petrauskas
Group B	(Kazakhstan) Barsy Atyrau	Atyrau, Kazakhstan	The team will play away	(Serbia) Aleksandar Vrzina

== Baltic League champions ==
=== Elite Division champions ===
Season	Champion	Runner Up	1st leg	2nd leg	Host City
2004–05	(Lithuania) Žalgiris Kaunas	(Lithuania) Lietuvos rytas	64–60	–	(Lithuania) Vilnius
2005–06	(Lithuania) Lietuvos rytas	(Lithuania) Žalgiris Kaunas	86–74	–	(Estonia) Tallinn
2006–07	(Lithuania) Lietuvos rytas	(Lithuania) Žalgiris Kaunas	81–77	–	(Latvia) Rīga
2007–08	(Lithuania) Žalgiris Kaunas	(Lithuania) Lietuvos rytas	86–84	–	(Lithuania) Šiauliai
2008–09	(Lithuania) Lietuvos rytas	(Lithuania) Žalgiris Kaunas	97–74	–	(Estonia) Tartu
2009–10	(Lithuania) Žalgiris Kaunas	(Lithuania) Lietuvos rytas	73–66	–	(Lithuania) Vilnius
2010–11	(Lithuania) Žalgiris Kaunas	(Latvia) VEF Rīga	75–67	–	(Lithuania) Kaunas
2011–12	(Lithuania) Žalgiris Kaunas	(Lithuania) Lietuvos rytas	74–70	–	(Lithuania) Šiauliai
2012–13	(Latvia) Ventspils	(Lithuania) Prienai	91–69	70–73	(Lithuania) Prienai & (Latvia) Ventspils
2013–14	(Lithuania) Šiauliai	(Lithuania) Prienai	62–57	78–66	(Lithuania) Prienai & (Lithuania) Šiauliai
2014–15	(Lithuania) Šiauliai	(Latvia) Ventspils	68–70	88–80	(Latvia) Ventspils & (Lithuania) Šiauliai
2015–16	(Lithuania) Šiauliai	(Estonia) Tartu Ülikool/Rock	74–81	102–76	(Estonia) Tartu & (Lithuania) Šiauliai
2016–17	(Lithuania) Vytautas	(Lithuania) Pieno žvaigždės	85–88	89–74	(Lithuania) Prienai & (Lithuania) Pasvalys
2017–18	(Lithuania) Pieno žvaigždės	(Latvia) Jūrmala	98–80	76–68	(Latvia) Jūrmala & (Lithuania) Pasvalys

=== Challenge Cup champions ===
Season	Champion	Runner Up	1st leg	2nd leg	Host City
2004–05	(Lithuania) Panevėžys	(Latvia) Bumerangs/Gulbene/ASK	87–74	–	(Lithuania) Panevėžys
2007–08	(Lithuania) Nevėžis	(Latvia) VEF Rīga	81–68	–	(Latvia) Rīga
2008–09	(Lithuania) Sakalai	(Latvia) VEF Rīga	84–77	–	(Lithuania) Utena
2009–10	(Sweden) Norrköping Dolphins	(Lithuania) Rūdupis	77–87	107–72	(Lithuania) Prienai & (Sweden) Norrköping
2010–11	(Lithuania) Juventus	(Lithuania) KK Kaunas	87–81	89–72	(Lithuania) Kaunas & (Lithuania) Utena
2011–12	(Lithuania) Lietkabelis	(Estonia) Rakvere Tarvas	89–74	71–82	(Estonia) Rakvere & (Lithuania) Panevėžys

=== BBL Cup winners ===
Season	Winner	Finalist	Score	Host City
2008	(Lithuania) Lietuvos rytas	(Latvia) Barons/LMT	80–78	(Latvia) Rīga
2009	(Lithuania) Žalgiris Kaunas	(Lithuania) Lietuvos rytas	83–78	(Lithuania) Kaunas
2010	(Estonia) Tartu Ülikool/Rock	(Lithuania) Lietuvos rytas	61–57	(Estonia) Tartu
2011	(Latvia) VEF Rīga	(Estonia) Tartu Ülikool	95–69	(Estonia) Tartu
2012	(Estonia) Rakvere Tarvas	(Latvia) Liepāja/Triobet	80–71	(Estonia) Rakvere
2013	(Lithuania) Nevėžis	(Estonia) Tartu Ülikool/Rock	82–64	(Lithuania) Kėdainiai
2014	(Latvia) Liepāja/Triobet	(Estonia) Tartu Ülikool/Rock	74–61	(Latvia) Liepāja
2015	Not held			
2016	(Latvia) Valmiera/ORDO	(Latvia) Ventspils	66–64	(Latvia) Valmiera
2017	Not held			

== Baltic League awards ==
=== Regular season MVP ===
Season	Player	Team
2004–05	(United States) Tanoka Beard	(Lithuania) Žalgiris Kaunas
2005–06	(Lithuania) Darjuš Lavrinovič	(Lithuania) Žalgiris Kaunas
2006–07	(United States) Travis Reed	(Estonia) Kalev/Cramo
2007–08	(Serbia) Vladimir Štimac	(Latvia) Valmiera
2008–09	(Lithuania) Paulius Jankūnas	(Lithuania) Žalgiris Kaunas
2009–10	(United States) Alex Renfroe	(Latvia) VEF Rīga
2010–11	(Belarus) Artsiom Parakhouski	(Latvia) VEF Rīga
2011–12	(Lithuania) Valdas Vasylius	(Lithuania) Šiauliai
2012–13	(Lithuania) Gediminas Orelik	(Lithuania) Prienai
2013–14	(United States) Travis Leslie	(Lithuania) Šiauliai

=== Finals MVP ===
Season	Player	Team
2004–05	(United States) Tanoka Beard	(Lithuania) Žalgiris Kaunas
2005–06	(United States) Fred House	(Lithuania) Lietuvos rytas
2006–07	(United States) Kareem Rush	(Lithuania) Lietuvos rytas
2007–08	(United States) DeJuan Collins	(Lithuania) Žalgiris Kaunas
2008–09	(United States) Chuck Eidson	(Lithuania) Lietuvos rytas
2009–10	(United States) Marcus Brown	(Lithuania) Žalgiris Kaunas
2010–11	(Lithuania) Tadas Klimavičius	(Lithuania) Žalgiris Kaunas
2011–12	(Lithuania) Mantas Kalnietis	(Lithuania) Žalgiris Kaunas
2012–13	(Latvia) Jānis Timma	(Latvia) Ventspils
2013–14	(United States) Travis Leslie	(Lithuania) Šiauliai
2014–15	(Lithuania) Gintaras Leonavičius	(Lithuania) Šiauliai
2015–16	(Lithuania) Rokas Giedraitis	(Lithuania) Šiauliai
2016–17	(Lithuania) Tomas Delininkaitis	(Lithuania) Vytautas
2017–18	(Canada) Jahenns Manigat	(Lithuania) Pieno žvaigždės

== Statistical leaders ==
Statistics include regular season and play-off games

=== Points per game ===
- 2004–05 (United States) Jason Coleman (neptunas): 25.00 (in 14 games)
- 2005–06 (Latvia) Akselis Vairogs (Valmiera): 20.90 (in 31 games)
- 2006–07 (United States) Travis Reed (Kalev/Cramo): 19.93 (in 29 games)
- 2007–08 (United States) Travis Reed (Kalev/Cramo): 17.39 (in 18 games)
- 2008–09 (Latvia) Ingus Bankevics (Valmiera): 19.61 (in 18 games)
- 2009–10 (Nigeria) - (United States) Josh Akognon (Kalev/Cramo): 19.53 (in 15 games)
- 2010–11 (United States) Bambale Osby (TTÜ/Kalev): 18.64 (in 22 games)
- 2011–12 (United States) Denzel Bowles (Šiauliai): 19.33 (in 12 games)
- 2012–13 (Estonia) Reimo Tamm (Rakvere Tarvas): 18.06 (in 18 games)
- 2013–14 (Latvia) Jānis Kaufmanis (Valmiera): 19.50 (in 14 games)
- 2014–15 (United States) Brandis Raley-Ross (Rakvere Tarvas): 21.18 (in 11 games)
- 2015–16 (United States) Andrew Warren (Pärnu Sadam): 25.57 (in 7 games)
- 2016–17 (United States) Trevin Parks (Barsy Atyrau): 21.57 (in 14 games)
- 2017–18 (Belarus) Yauheni Beliankou (Tsmoki-Minsk II): 18.40 (in 10 games)

=== Rebounds per game ===
- 2004–05 (United States) Duke Freeman-McKamey (Panevėžys): 13.22 (in 9 games)
- 2005–06 (Lithuania) Darjuš Lavrinovič (Žalgiris): 9.87 (in 31 games)
- 2006–07 (United States) A. J. Bramlett (ASK Rīga): 8.38 (in 21 games)
- 2007–08 (Serbia) Vladimir Štimac (Valmiera): 10.95 (in 20 games)
- 2008–09 (United States) Tanoka Beard (Tartu Ülikool/Rock): 9.26 (in 23 games)
- 2009–10 (United States) Alex Renfroe (VEF Rīga): 7.24 (in 21 games)
- 2010–11 (United States) Bambale Osby (TTÜ/Kalev): 11.95 (in 22 games)
- 2011–12 (United States) David James McClure (Kedainiai/Triobet): 9.28 (in 18 games)
- 2012–13 (United States) Tyler Cain (Barons kvartāls): 11.43 (in 14 games)
- 2013–14 (Sweden) Joakim Kjellbom (Norrköping Dolphins): 9.69 (in 16 games)
- 2014–15 (Lithuania) Ronaldas Rutkauskas (KK Pärnu): 10.44 (in 9 games)
- 2015–16 (United States) Stephan Zack (Liepaja/Triobet): 11.00 (in 12 games)
- 2016–17 (Netherlands) Thomas van der Mars (AVIS Rapla): 11.43 (in 14 games)
- 2017–18 (Latvia) Viktors Iļjins (Valmiera ORDO): 11.00 (in 11 games)

=== Assists per game ===
- 2004–05 (Latvia) Raimonds Gabrāns (Bumerangs/Gulbene/ASK): 6.38 (in 16 games)
- 2005–06 (Latvia) Raimonds Gabrāns (Bumerangs/Gulbene/ASK): 5.19 (in 32 games)
- 2006–07 (Lithuania) Tomas Gaidamavičius (Panevėžys): 4.58 (in 24 games)
- 2007–08 (United States) Curtis Nash (Valmiera): 4.18 (in 11 games)
- 2008–09 (Georgia (country)) Giorgi Tsintsadze (Tartu Ülikool/Rock): 5.09 (in 23 games)
- 2009–10 (United States) Charron Fisher (Kalev/Cramo): 8.79 (in 14 games)
- 2010–11 (Lithuania) Evaldas Dainys (Rūdupis): 5.25 (in 16 games)
- 2011–12 (United States) Rashaun Broadus (Šiauliai): 4.39 (in 23 games)
- 2012–13 (Lithuania) Augustas Pečiukevičius (KK Pärnu): 5.71 (in 14 games)
- 2013–14 (Latvia) Rinalds Sirsniņš (Jēkabpils): 4.83 (in 12 games)
- 2014–15 (Greece) Nikos Gkikas (Ventspils): 5.88 (in 8 games)
- 2015–16 (Estonia) Rait-Riivo Laane (TTÜ KK): 6.58 (in 12 games)
- 2016–17 (Croatia) Toni Prostran (Nevėžis): 9.33 (in 15 games)
- 2017–18 (Lithuania) Donatas Sabeckis (Šiauliai): 6.88 (in 16 games)

== See also ==
- Baltic Basketball All-Star Game
- Latvian-Estonian Basketball League
- Latvian Basketball League
- Estonian Basketball League
- Lithuanian Basketball League
