= BC Pieno žvaigždės =

Pieno žvaigždės Pasvalys
- Founded: 1999
- Dissolved: 2024
- Arena: Pieno žvaigždės Arena
- Capacity: 1,200
- Location: Pasvalys, Lithuania
- Team colors: Navy, Yellow, White
- President: Rimantas Endrijaitis
- General manager: Arūnas Burkevičius
- Ownership: Pieno žvaigždės (majority); Pasvalys District Municipality (3% after 2017)
- Championships: 1 LKAL; 1 NKL; 1 BBL
- Website: bcpienozvaigzdes.lt
Home	Away

BC Pieno žvaigždės (Lithuanian: Krepšinio klubas Pieno žvaigždės) was a professional basketball club from Pasvalys, Lithuania. Founded in 1999, the team competed in the top-tier Lithuanian Basketball League (LKL) for 13 seasons from 2011 to 2024. The club name comes from the main sponsor Pieno žvaigždės.

== History ==
Founded in 1999, the club played its inaugural season in the now-defunct fourth-tier Lithuanian Basketball C League (LKCL). In 2001, the club gained the right to play in the third division LKBL. In 2003, the club debuted in the LKAL league and took fourth place (regular season: 19–15). The 2003–2004 LKAL season was more successful for Pieno žvaigždės as they won the regular season (regular season: 39–13). During the 2006–2007 season, Pieno žvaigždės played in the new second Lithuania basketball league, NKL, and took fifth place (regular season: 22-22). In their second NKL season, BC Pieno žvaigždės took only eight place (regular season: 17–15). The 2008–2009 season was more successful and Pieno žvaigždės took sixth place (regular season: 23–13). The 2009–2010 NKL season was one of the most successful in the club history as BC Pieno žvaigždės took third place in NKL (regular season: 21–9).

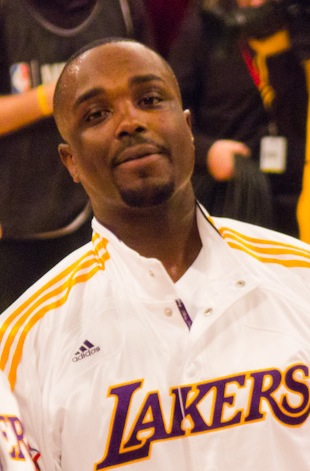
Derrick Caracter, one of the team's leaders in the 2013–14 season.

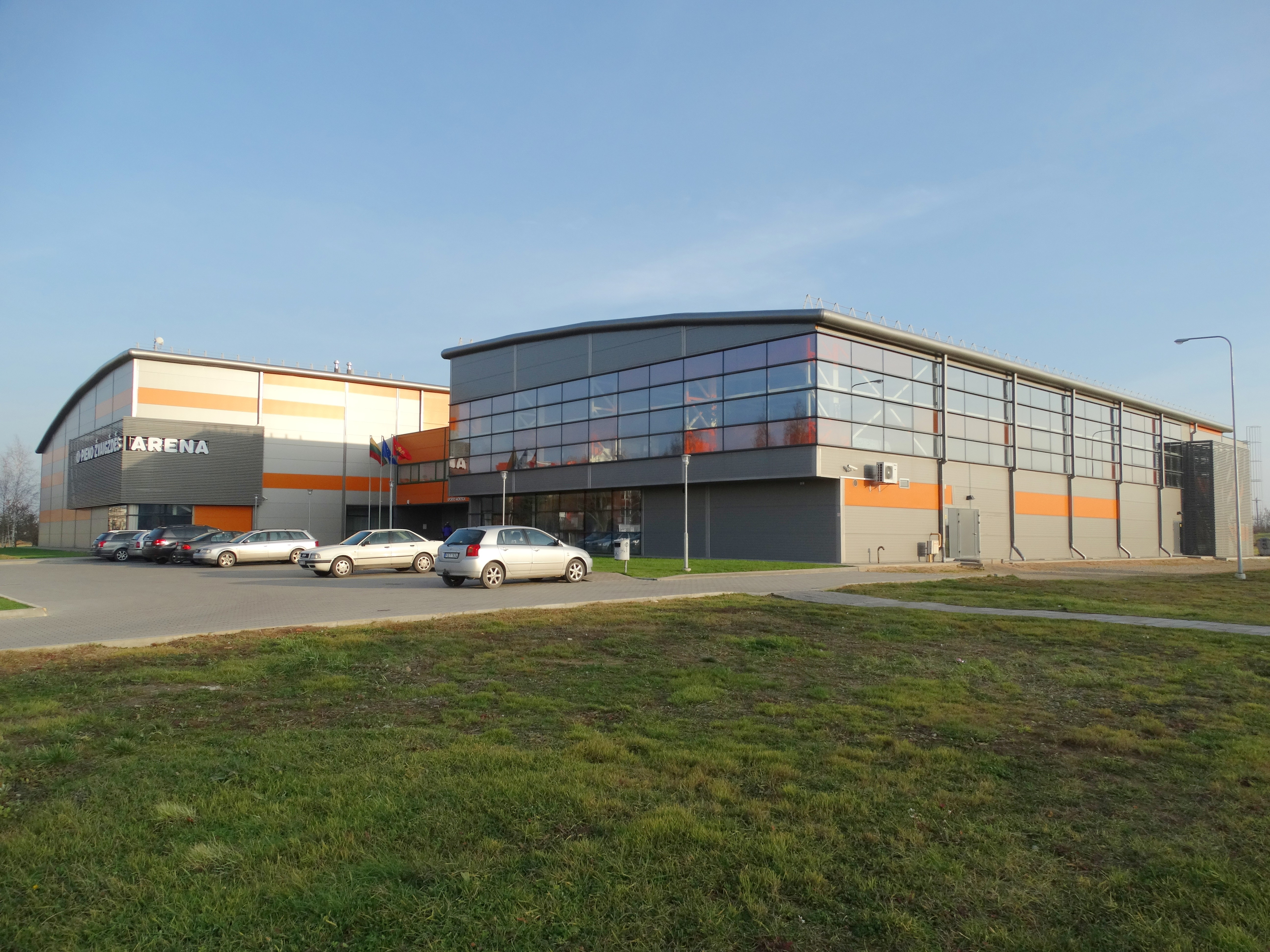
Since 2011 Pieno žvaigždės played in the newly built arena.

However this was not the end, as BC Pieno žvaigždės ended their 2010–2011 NKL regular season with 41:1 win/lose ratio (lost to Meresta Pakruojis by 1 point). On 16/17 April 2011, BC Pieno žvaigždės participated in NKL final four and became NKL champions. Also they got their chance to enter Lithuania super basketball league LKL, because of that, Pieno žvaigždės played three transition matches against Naglis (loser goes to NKL and the winner is automatically transferred to Lithuania super basketball league LKL). On 26 April 2011, Pieno žvaigždės lost their first transition match against Naglis in Palanga. On 29 April 2011 however, Pieno žvaigždės won the second game of the transition series in Pasvalys. The perfect BC "Pieno žvaigždės" season finished very unsuccessfully as they lost the third transition series game against Naglis by only one point with result 68:69. Because of that, Pieno žvaigždės had to stay in NKL.

On 14 July 2011, Pieno žvaigždės merged with LKL participant Perlas, so they participated in premier Lithuania basketball league LKL. The main team coach was former Perlas coach Roberts Štelmahers. Pieno Žvaigždės debuted in the LKL league on 7 October 2011 against Techasas, they won the match with result 84:56.

In 2011–2012 season Pieno žvaigždės participated in LKF Cup tournament. They eliminated Šiauliai in last round of playoffs and advanced to final four, which took place in Kaunas. The semi-final was against Rūdupis, which, after very tight game Pieno žvaigždės won with result 68:67.

However, the team was no match for Žalgiris Kaunas, losing 62:99. Over the next two seasons, the team played solidly in both the LKL and BBL competitions, reaching the quarterfinals each time, also reaching the LKF Cup finals in 2013, though losing to BC Prienai.

In the 2014–15 LKL season, Pieno žvaigždės were just one step away from defeating Juventus in the quarter-finals, losing the fifth series game by 8 points. Juventus later played in the LKL bronze final and surprisingly defeated Euroleague participant BC Neptūnas there.

On 29 July 2015 the club was invited to join the 2015–16 FIBA Europe Cup tournament, which is the alternative version of the 2nd tier European tournament ULEB Eurocup, organized by FIBA. University of Florida standout Dennis Mavin and Khimik star Ramone Moore strengthened the team roster in the summer of 2015. The team advanced into the second stage of the FIBA Europe Cup by clinching the second place in the group and surprisingly leaving the last season's Polish champions and Euroleague participants Turów Zgorzelec shocked. They were eliminated in the second stage, with KK Cibona and Energia Târgu Jiu advancing. BC Pieno žvaigždės once again reached the quarterfinal stage in the LKL, but lost to BC Žalgiris.

In the 2016–2017 season, Pieno žvaigždės reached the Baltic Basketball League finals for the first time in club history, after being the best team in regular season. They defeated BK Ogre/Kumho Tyres in the first round of the playoffs, Liepāja Triobet in the quarterfinals, and BC Tartu in the semifinals, before losing to BC Vytautas in the finals. In the LKL, Pieno žvaigždės once again lost in the quarterfinals, this time to BC Lietuvos rytas. The leaders and stars of the team during the 2016 and 2017 seasons were Derrick Low and Steponas Babrauskas.

In the 2017–2018 season, Rimantas Grigas, who coached the team in the 2013–2014 season, returned as coach. Pieno žvaigždės resigned Steponas Babrauskas and signed Vyacheslav Bobrov, who quickly became the team leader. While Pieno žvaigždės remained undefeated in the BBL and had a solid 5–7 record (5th place) in the LKL, coach Grigas was shockingly replaced as head coach by Gediminas Petrauskas. Along with Petrauskas, Pieno žvaigždės signed former club players Osvaldas Olisevičius and Trévon Hughes to return to the team, and also signed solid players like center Lis Shoshi and guard Jahenns Manigat to help the team. In the BBL, Pieno žvaigždės dominated, losing only one game in the regular season and finishing with an 11–1 record. Rival and BBL champion BC Vytautas shockingly left the competition during the season. In the BBL playoffs, Pieno žvaigždės beat KK Pärnu in the quarterfinals 174:150 (96:66 and 78:84) on aggregate in the quarterfinals, and BC Šiauliai 159:148 (91:84 and 68:64) on aggergrate in the semifinals. In the finals, facing BK Jūrmala, Pieno žvaigždės was the heavy favorite, and proved it by winning in dominating fashion, 174:148 (98:80 and 76:68) on aggregate, winning the BBL championship. Manigat was the finals MVP. Pieno žvaigždės recovered in the LKL, and by the end of the regular season, finished in 6th place. They faced BC Neptūnas, one of the top teams in Lithuania for the past years, and gave a good fight, losing the series 1:3.

Petrauskas remained as head coach for the 2018–2019 season. For the first half of the season, Pieno žvaigždės played a largely unspectacular basketball, led by Emmanuel Omogbo. By December, changes were made. Many players were released, with Yannick Franke, Jay Threatt and the returning Žygimantas Skučas being signed to improve the team. Omogbo was released. Pieno žvaigždės went on an amazing run during December–March, winning 12 of the next 15 games in the LKL, and climbing up to 4th place in the standings, with a 16–11 record. However, the good news ended there - Pieno žvaigzdės lost the next 9 games in a row, falling to 5th place and ending the regular season with a 16–20 record. In the playoffs, Pieno žvaigždės were eliminated by cross-town rival BC Lietkabelis, swept in two games.

Due to the COVID-19 pandemic, the 2019–2020 season ended early. Pieno žvaigždės finished in 7th place in the LKL. The team was led by John Gillon, Miha Lapornik and Paulius Petrilevičius. In the King Mindaugas Cup, for the third season in a row, Pieno žvaigždės were eliminated by BC Lietkabelis. The 2020–2021 season was the last for Pieno žvaigždės under coach Petrauskas. Tomas Lekūnas, Petrilevčius and Edgaras Želionis lead the team in scoring. Pieno žvaigždės made the LKL playoffs, but were swept by BC Žalgiris, finishing in 8th place.

Before the 2021–2022 season, during the summer, coach Petrauskas left the team, and was replaced by the returning Mantas Šernius, the LKL Coach of the Year of the previous season. The season was marked by constant roster changes, and despite solid play by late season additions Randy Culpepper and Markell Johnson, as well as Žygimantas Skučas and Arnas Beručka, Pieno žvaigždės missed the LKL playoffs for the first time in club history. The 9th-place finish was the worst in club history in the LKL.

Over the next two seasons, Pieno žvaigždės plummeted even further. In the 2022-2023 season, under coach Ramūnas Cvirka, even with strong play from the returning John Gillon, Jared Cunningham, Rihards Kuksiks, Martynas Pacevičius, Corey Allen-Williams, Evaldas Šaulys and Julius Jucikas, Pieno žvaigždės finished only 10th. And in the 2023-2024 season, the bottom fell off for Pieno žvaigždės - they started the LKL season with an 0-6 record, and at one point, lost a club record 14 consecutive games. Even with a new head coach in Aurimas Jasilionis, and strong play from Brandon Tabb (who left during the season), Kadeem Jack, Jordan Watson, Simas Jarumbauskas and Martynas Arlauskas - Pieno žvaigždės finished 11th - last place in the LKL.

On 15 July 2024, Pieno žvaigždės announced its withdrawal from the upcoming 2024–25 LKL season, after being unable to meet the financial requirements of the league.

== Team ==
=== Current roster ===
Note: Flags indicate national team eligibility at FIBA-sanctioned events. Players may hold other non-FIBA nationalities not displayed.

BC Pieno žvaigždės roster
Players	Coaches
Pos. / No. / Nat. / Name / Ht. / Wt. / Age	Head coach: Vacant; Legend: (C) Team captain; Injured

=== Depth chart ===
Pos.	Starting 5	Bench
C
PF
SF
SG
PG

== Season by season ==
- 2003–2004 season: 4th LKAL (reg. season: 19–15)
- 2004–2005 season: 5th (reg. season winner: 39–13)
- 2005–2006 season: 8th NKL (reg. season: 22-22)
- 2006–2007 season: 5th NKL (reg. season: 22-22)
- 2007–2008 season: 8th NKL (reg. season: 17–15)
- 2008–2009 season: 6th NKL (reg. season: 23–13)
- 2009–2010 season: 3rd NKL (reg. season: 21–9)
- 2010–2011 season: 1st NKL (reg. season: 41–1, lost promotion playoffs)

Season	Tier	League	Pos.	Baltic League		LKF Cup KMT Cup
2003–04	2	LKAL	4th			
2004–05	2	LKAL	5th			
2005–06	2	NKL	8th			
2006–07	2	NKL	5th			
2007–08	2	NKL	8th			
2008–09	2	NKL	8th			
2009–10	2	NKL	6th			
2010–11	2	NKL	1st			
2011–12	1	LKL	5th	Elite Division	9th	Runner-up
2012–13	1	LKL	5th	Quarterfinalist		Runner-up
2013–14	1	LKL	5th	Quarterfinalist		Sixth round
2014–15	1	LKL	5th	Quarterfinalist		Quarterfinalist
2015–16	1	LKL	8th	Quarterfinalist		
2016–17	1	LKL	7th	Runner up		Quarterfinalist
2017–18	1	LKL	6th	Champion		Quarterfinalist
2018–19	1	LKL	5th			Quarterfinalist
2019–20	1	LKL	7th			Quarterfinalist
2020–21	1	LKL	8th			Quarterfinalist
2021–22	1	LKL	9th			First round
2022–23	1	LKL	10th			First round
2023–24	1	LKL	11th			Group stage

Detailed information of former rosters and results.

== Head coaches ==
- (Lithuania) Rimantas Endrijaitis 2010–2011
- (Latvia) Roberts Štelmahers 2011–2012
- (Lithuania) Nerijus Zabarauskas 2012–2013
- (Lithuania) Mindaugas Lukošius 2013
- (Lithuania) Rimantas Grigas 2013–2014, 2017
- (Lithuania) Mantas Šernius 2014–2016, 2021–2022
- (Lithuania) Ramūnas Cvirka 2016–2017, 2022–2023
- (Lithuania) Gediminas Petrauskas 2017–2021
- (Lithuania) Aurimas Jasilionis 2023–2024

== Notable players ==
- Lithuanians:
- (Lithuania) Gytis Sirutavičius 2003–2004, 2011–2012, 2012–2013, 2014–2015, 2018–2019
- (Lithuania) Evaldas Kairys 2011–2015
- (Lithuania) Aurimas Kieža 2011–2012
- (Lithuania) Eimantas Bendžius 2011–2012
- (Lithuania) Edgaras Ulanovas 2012–2013
- (Lithuania) Šarūnas Vasiliauskas 2012–2013
- (Lithuania) Žygimantas Jonušas 2013–2014
- (Lithuania) Dovydas Redikas 2013–2014, 2015–2016
- (Lithuania) Egidijus Dimša 2013–2014, 2016–2017
- (Lithuania) Artūras Jomantas 2013–2014
- (Lithuania) Rolandas Alijevas 2013–2014
- (Lithuania) Tauras Jogėla 2014–2015
- (Lithuania) Laimonas Kisielius 2014–2015, 2019–2020
- (Lithuania) Osvaldas Olisevičius 2014–2017, 2018
- (Lithuania) Steponas Babrauskas 2015–2018
- (Lithuania) Žygimantas Skučas 2018–2019, 2021–2022
- (Lithuania) Paulius Petrilevičius 2019–2022
- (Lithuania) Edgaras Želionis 2020–2021
- (Lithuania) Arnas Beručka 2021–2022
- (Lithuania) Ignas Vaitkus 2022–2023
- Foreigners:
- (United States) Trévon Hughes 2011–2013, 2017–2018
- (Brazil) Paulão Prestes 2012
- (United States) Yancy Gates 2012–2013, 2018–19
- (United States) Darrel Mitchell 2013–2014
- (United States) Derrick Caracter 2013–2014
- (United States) Michael Dixon 2014–2015
- (United States) Alex Oriakhi 2014–2015
- (United States) Ramone Moore 2015–2016
- (United States) Derrick Low 2015–2017
- (Ukraine) Vyacheslav Bobrov 2017–2018
- (Kosovo) Lis Shoshi 2018
- (Nigeria) Emmanuel Omogbo 2018–2019
- (United States) Jay Threatt 2018–2019
- (Netherlands) Yannick Franke 2018–2019, 2021
- (United States) John Gillon 2019–2020, 2023
- (Slovenia) Miha Lapornik 2019–2020
- (Serbia) Branko Mirković 2020–2021
- (United States) Markell Johnson 2021–2022
- (United States) Randy Culpepper 2022
- (Ukraine) Dmytro Skapintsev 2022
