= LSU-Atletas =

Professional basketball club based in Kaunas, Lithuania

KK Atletas
- Leagues: National Basketball League
- Founded: 1962
- History: Atletas (1962–1998); Topo Centras–Atletas (1998–2004); Hidruva–Atletas (2004–2005); Atletas (2005–2007); Aisčiai-Atletas (2007–2008); Aisčiai (2008–2010); BC Kaunas (2010–2011); BC Baltai (2011–2012); LSU-Baltai (2012–2013); LSU-Atletas (2013–2014, 2015–2021); KK Atletas (2021-present)
- Arena: Garliava Arena
- Location: Garliava, Lithuania
- Team colors: Yellow and Light green
- Head coach: Remigijus Bardauskas
- Championships: 5 Lithuanian SSR Championships
Home	Away

KK Atletas (Lithuanian: Kauno rajono Krepšinio Klubas Atletas) is a professional basketball club that is based in Kaunas district, Lithuania. Currently, the team plays in the National Basketball League. In the past, Atletas participated in the LKL and the Baltic League, before dissolving in 2007 and becoming BC Aisčiai-Atletas. In 2009, the team merged with BC Kaunas Triobet and played with the names of Kaunas, Baltai and LSU-Baltai. In 2013, the club was renamed again to LSU-Atletas as it merged with the NKL champions of the same name. Atletas are multiple time LKL finalists and were once considered to be one of the strongest teams in Lithuania.

Lithuanian stars Žydrūnas Ilgauskas, Saulius Štombergas, and Donatas Motiejūnas have all played for the club in the early stages of their careers.

== Latest seasons ==
Season	League	Pos.	Significant Events	Baltic League	Pos.	LKF Cup
2008–09	LKL	6	Quarterfinalist	Challenge Cup	3	Round of 16
2009–10	LKL	13	–	Challenge Cup	13	First round
2010–11	LKL	10	–	Challenge Cup	2	First round
2011–12	LKL	8	–	Elite Division	13	–
2012–13	LKL	11	–	Elite Division	R1	Fourth round
2013–14	LKL	12	Relegated	–	–	Fourth round

== Honours ==
=== Domestic competitions ===
- Lithuanian SSR Championship

Winners (5): 1968, 1982, 1983, 1989, 1990

== Notable former players ==
- (Lithuania) Rimas Kurtinaitis
- (Lithuania) Tomas Pačėsas
- (Lithuania) Gvidonas Markevičius
- (Lithuania) Darius Dimavičius
- (Lithuania) Rytis Vaišvila
- (Lithuania) Darius Sirtautas
- (Lithuania) Saulius Štombergas
- (Lithuania) Tomas Masiulis
- (Lithuania) Virginijus Praškevičius
- (Lithuania) Žydrūnas Ilgauskas
- (Lithuania) Donatas Motiejūnas
- (Lithuania) Artūras Milaknis
- (Lithuania) Povilas Butkevičius
- (Lithuania) Šarūnas Vasiliauskas
- (Estonia) Siim-Sander Vene
- (Lithuania) Jonas Mačiulis
- (United States) Ricky Davis
