= Eurocup Basketball 2012–13 Regular Season Group A =

Standings and Results for Group A of the Regular Season phase of the 2012–13 Eurocup basketball tournament.

== Standings ==
All times are CET (UTC+1).

Key to colors
Top two teams advance to Last 16

	Team	Pld	W	L	PF	PA	Diff	Tie-break
1.	(Ukraine) BC Budivelnyk Kyiv	6	4	2	469	441	+28	
2.	(Czech Republic) ČEZ Nymburk	6	3	3	469	451	+18	1–1 (+9)
3.	(Israel) Hapoel Jerusalem	6	3	3	473	475	–2	1–1 (–9)
4.	(Lithuania) BC Prienai	6	2	4	444	488	–44	

=== Game 1 ===
7 November 2012
18:00

Report

BC Prienai (Lithuania)	85–72	(Israel) Hapoel Jerusalem
Scoring by quarter: 16–16, 19–17, 26–21, 24–18
Pts: Orelik 26; Rebs: Urbutis 11; Asts: Janavičius, Orelik, Kadžiulis 4		Pts: Smith 15; Rebs: Fells 7 Asts: Fells 4

Kaunas Sports Hall, Kaunas
Attendance: 2,000
Referees: Juan Carlos Arteaga (ESP), Lahdo Sharro (SWE), Oskars Lucis (LAT)

7 November 2012
18:00

Report

ČEZ Nymburk (Czech Republic)	91–78	(Ukraine) BC Budivelnyk Kyiv
Scoring by quarter: 19–15, 29–19, 26–19, 17–25
Pts: Benda 18; Rebs: Benda 5 Asts: Pavković 10		Pts: Tsintsadze 14; Rebs: Herasymchuk 7 Asts: Herasymchuk, Tsintsadze 2

ČEZ Aréna, Pardubice
Attendance: 2,422
Referees: Jakub Zamojski (POL), Aare Halliko (EST), Alexey Davydov (RUS)

=== Game 2 ===
14 November 2012
18:00

Report

BC Budivelnyk Kyiv (Ukraine)	84–57	(Lithuania) BC Prienai
Scoring by quarter: 16–22, 16–10, 23–10, 29–15
Pts: Lyons, Tsintsadze 16; Rebs: Anisimov, Delaney 7 Asts: Tsintsadze, Drozdov 3		Pts: Valeika 15; Rebs: Valeika 7 Asts: Kadžiulis 6

Palace of Sports, Kyiv
Attendance: 2,500
Referees: Marek Cmikiewicz (POL), Sasa Maricic (SRB), Arnis Ozols (LAT)

14 November 2012
19:00

Report

Hapoel Jerusalem (Israel)	69–86	(Czech Republic) ČEZ Nymburk
Scoring by quarter: 13–16, 22–21, 20–25, 14–24
Pts: Smith 23; Rebs: Smith 8 Asts: Tapiro 4		Pts: Hruban 19; Rebs: Nečas 5 Asts: Abrams 5

Malha Arena, Jerusalem
Attendance: 1,800
Referees: Carl Jungebrand (GER), Andrej Lovsyn (SLO), Ingus Baumanis (LAT)

=== Game 3 ===
21 November 2012
18:00

Report

BC Prienai (Lithuania)	84–66	(Czech Republic) ČEZ Nymburk
Scoring by quarter: 21–17, 30–17, 13–19, 20–13
Pts: Janavičius 16; Rebs: Urbutis 11; Asts: Orelikas 4		Pts: Rančík 19; Rebs: Benda, Rančík 7 Asts: Welsch 4

Kaunas Sports Hall, Kaunas
Attendance: 1,100
Referees: Olegs Latisevs (LAT), Sergiy Chebyshev (UKR), Igor Dragojevic (MNE)

21 November 2012
19:00

Report

Hapoel Jerusalem (Israel)	81–67	(Ukraine) BC Budivelnyk Kyiv
Scoring by quarter: 22–18, 27–15, 12–20, 20–14
Pts: Smith 18; Rebs: Fells 9 Asts: Tapiro 5		Pts: Lyons 18; Rebs: Lyons 8 Asts: Tsintsadze, Drozdov 4

Malha Arena, Jerusalem
Attendance: 1,500
Referees: Sreten Radovic (CRO), Elias Koromilas (GRE), Gentian Cici (ALB)

=== Game 4 ===
28 November 2012
18:00

Report

BC Budivelnyk Kyiv (Ukraine)	84–77	(Israel) Hapoel Jerusalem
Scoring by quarter: 24–26, 22–18, 16–14, 22–19
Pts: Delaney 22; Rebs: Drozdov 12; Asts: Tsintsadze 5		Pts: Pullen 22; Rebs: Fells, Duncan 9 Asts: Limonad 5

Palace of Sports, Kyiv
Attendance: 2,000
Referees: Grzegorz Ziemblicki (POL), Sinisa Herceg (CRO), Aleksandar Glisic (SRB)

28 November 2012
19:30

Report

ČEZ Nymburk (Czech Republic)	90–66	(Lithuania) BC Prienai
Scoring by quarter: 14–18, 32–24, 24–14, 20–10
Pts: Benda, Hruban 20; Rebs: Rančík 9 Asts: Pavković 7		Pts: Vene, Urbutis 13; Rebs: Vene 5 Asts: Orelikas, Kadžiulis 3

ČEZ Aréna, Pardubice
Attendance: 1,850
Referees: Anastasios Piloidis (GRE), Marko Juras (SRB), Aleksandar Milojevic (MKD)

=== Game 5 ===
5 December 2012
18:00

Report

Hapoel Jerusalem (Israel)	92–79	(Lithuania) BC Prienai
Scoring by quarter: 25–21, 26–18, 21–17, 20–23
Pts: Fells 25; Rebs: Duncan 10; Asts: Pullen 6		Pts: Vene 18; Rebs: Vene 7 Asts: Janavičius 6

Malha Arena, Jerusalem
Attendance: 1,500
Referees: Murat Biricik (TUR), Petar Obradovic (BIH), Petros Papapetrou (GRE)

5 December 2012
18:00

Report

BC Budivelnyk Kyiv (Ukraine)	72–62	(Czech Republic) ČEZ Nymburk
Scoring by quarter: 18–15, 25–9, 15–18, 14–20
Pts: Delaney 28; Rebs: Four players 6 Asts: Delaney 4		Pts: Rančík 17; Rebs: Rančík 10; Asts: Pavković 5

Palace of Sports, Kyiv
Attendance: 1,800
Referees: Spiros Gkontas (GRE), Marcin Kowalski (POL), Ersan Kartal (TUR)

=== Game 6 ===
12 December 2012
20:30

Report

BC Prienai (Lithuania)	73–84	(Ukraine) BC Budivelnyk Kyiv
Scoring by quarter: 14–26, 21–25, 23–14, 15–19
Pts: Kadžiulis 18; Rebs: Vene 7 Asts: Janavičius, Orelikas, Kadžiulis 3		Pts: Anisimov 16; Rebs: Anisimov 8 Asts: Tsintsadze 4

Kaunas Sports Hall, Kaunas
Attendance: 250
Referees: Andrej Jersan (SLO), Sergio Silva (POR), Ingus Baumanis (LAT)

12 December 2012
20:30

Report

ČEZ Nymburk (Czech Republic)	74–82	(Israel) Hapoel Jerusalem
Scoring by quarter: 22–21, 23–22, 10–22, 19–17
Pts: Pavković 19; Rebs: Four players 4 Asts: Welsch 5		Pts: Limonad 20; Rebs: Kadir 9 Asts: Pullen 4

ČEZ Aréna, Pardubice
Attendance: 1,050
Referees: Eddie Viator (FRA), Marius Ciulin (ROM), Sergiy Zashchuk (UKR)
