= Gintaras Kadžiulis =

Lithuanian basketball player and coach (born 1980)

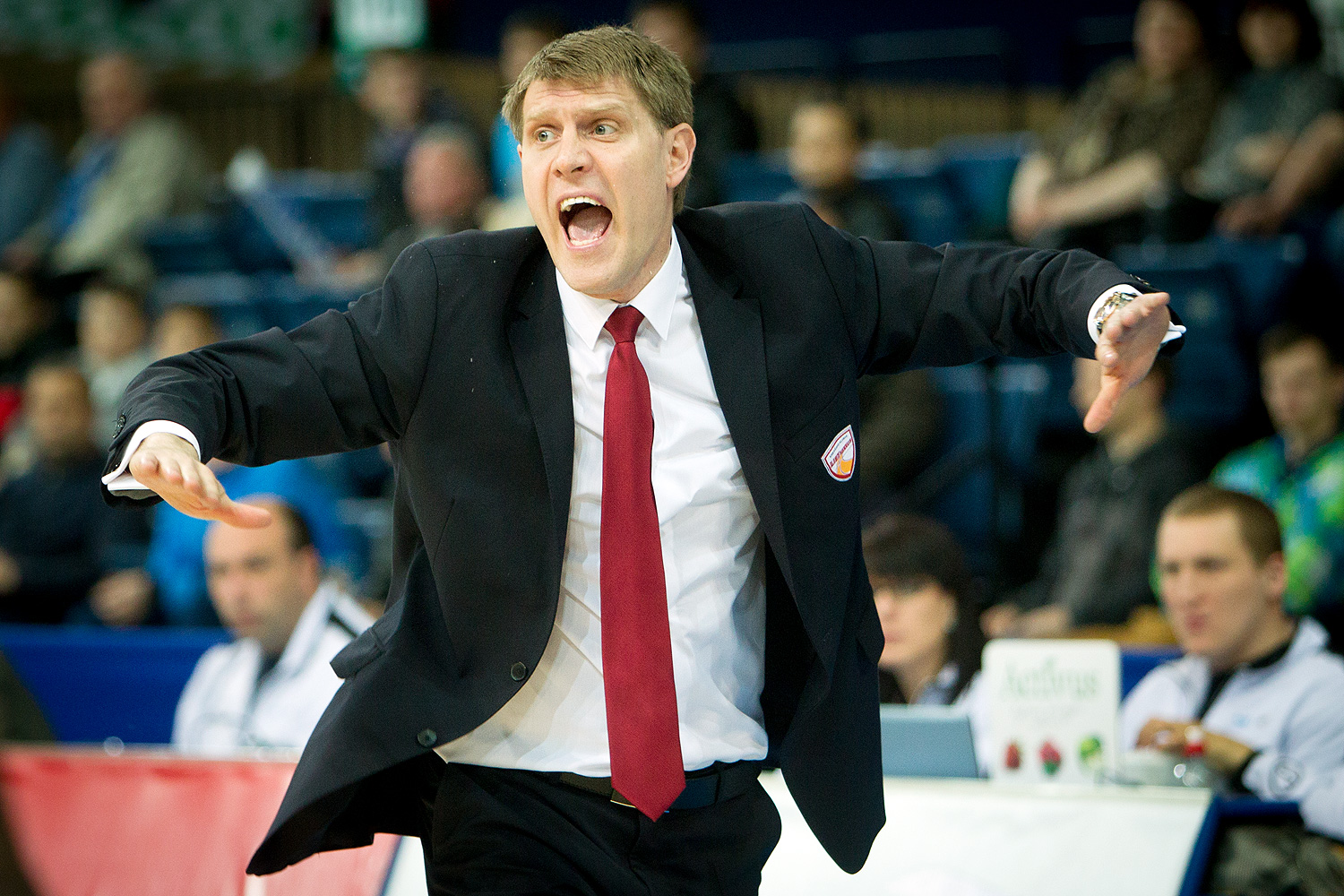
- Kadžiulis with Lietkabelis Panevėžys in 2015

Rytas-2
- Title: Head coach
- League: National Basketball League

Personal information
- Born: March 29, 1980 (age 46) Panevėžys, Lithuania
- Listed height: 192 cm (6 ft 4 in)
- Listed weight: 200 lb (91 kg)

Career information
- NBA draft: 2012: undrafted
- Playing career: 1996–2014
- Position: Point guard
- Coaching career: 2014–present

Career history

Playing
- 1996–1999: Kalnapilis Panevėžys
- 1999–2001: Lietuvos rytas Vilnius
- 2001–2002: Alita Alytus
- 2002–2003: Ural Great Perm
- 2003–2005: Anwil Włocławek
- 2005–2006: Panionios
- 2006: Anwil Włocławek
- 2006–2007: Kager Gdynia
- 2007–2008: Atlas Stal Ostrów
- 2008–2009: Šiauliai
- 2009–2010: Trefl Sopot
- 2010–2011: Budućnost Podgorica
- 2011–2014: Prienai

Coaching
- 2014: Lietkabelis Panevėžys (assistant)
- 2014–2015: Lietkabelis Panevėžys
- 2015–2018: Lietkabelis Panevėžys (assistant)
- 2018: Lietkabelis Panėvežys
- 2019–2022: Parma (assistant)
- 2022-2023: Juventus Utena
- 2024-present: Rytas-2 Vilnius

Career highlights
- LKL champion (2000); LKL All-Star (2013); Polish Basketball All-Star Game MVP (2005)

Gintaras Kadžiulis (born 29 March 1980) is a Lithuanian professional basketball coach and former player. His playing position was combo guard.

== Professional career ==
Born in Panevėžys, Kadžiulis started his professional basketball career at the age of 16, when he signed with Kalnapilis Panevėžys. After three seasons, he moved to Lietuvos rytas Vilnius. In 2002, Kadžiulis was an entrant in the NBA draft, but went undrafted. Continuing his career in Europe, Kadžiulis played for various Russian and Polish teams. He came back to Lithuania in 2008, signing with Šiauliai, but following the season, he again moved abroad. In 2011, he returned to Lithuania and signed with Prienai.

== Coaching career ==
Right after declaring his retirement in 2014, he announced he was coming home to Panevėžys and became an assistant coach under Mindaugas Budzinauskas of Lietkabelis Panevėžys. After Budzinauskas left the team just a few months into the 2014–15 season, he was given the role of head coach. In his debut as head coach, Lietkabelis defeated BC Valmiera in the Baltic Basketball League 96–85. He was replaced as head coach in December 2015 by Kazys Maksvytis, though he remained with the team as an assistant coach. As assistant, he helped coach Maksvytis and Lietkabelis to reach the LKL finals in 2017. He stayed as assistant coach for Artūrs Štālbergs for the 2017–2018 season, and when coach Štālbergs got fired, for Vitaliy Cherniy and Ramūnas Butautas. After a 4th-place finish, a disappointment for Lietkabelis, Kadžiulis was named head coach for the 2018–2019 season. After a poor start in the season, Kadžiulis was fired.
