= Žygimantas Jonušas =

Lithuanian basketball player (born 1982)

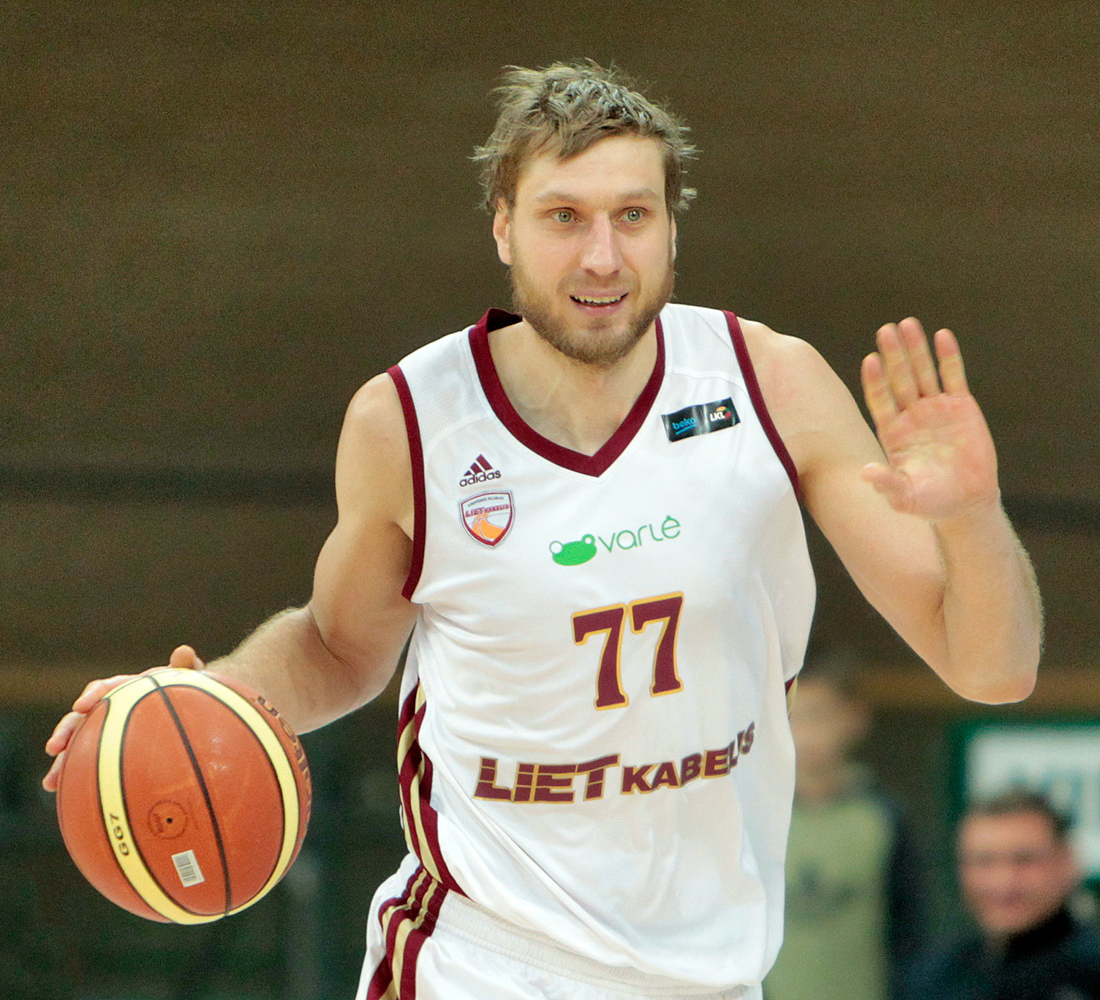
- Žygimantas Jonušas with Lietkabelis Panevėžys

Personal information
- Born: February 22, 1982 (age 44) Klaipėda, Lithuanian SSR, Soviet Union
- Listed height: 6 ft 7 in (2.01 m)
- Listed weight: 192 lb (87 kg)

Career information
- Playing career: 2000–2016
- Position: Small forward
- Number: 77

Career history
- 2000–2001: Neptūnas
- 2001–2002: LKKA-Atletas Kaunas
- 2002–2003: Old Spice Pruszków
- 2003–2005: Alita
- 2005–2006: Polpak Świecie
- 2006–2009: Eisbären Bremerhaven
- 2009: Rūdupis
- 2009–2010: MBC Mykolaiv
- 2010–2012: Phoenix Hagen
- 2012–2013: Juvecaserta
- 2013–2014: Pieno žvaigždės
- 2014–2015: Lietkabelis
- 2015–2016: Grand Avignon-Sorgues
- 2016: Caen Calvados

Career highlights
- Phoenix Hagen Team of the Century

Žygimantas Jonušas (born 22 February 1982 in Klaipėda) is a retired Lithuanian professional basketball player. Standing at 6 ft 7 in (2.01 m), Jonušas usually plays as small forward.

== Professional career ==
Jonušas played for various European clubs over the course of his career, starting with BC Neptūnas of Lithuania. He led BC Alita to the LKL quarterfinals during his stint there, averaging 19.3 points, 5.7 rebounds, 2.6 assists and 1.3 steals per game during the 2004–05 season. He also had a played for Eisbären Bremerhaven, where he averaged double digit points in two out of his three seasons in Basketball Bundesliga.
