= Pavilonis =

- Lithuanian surname
- m.: Pavilonis
- f.: (unmarried): Pavilonytė
- f.: (married): Pavilonienė

Pavilonis is a Lithuanian surname

- Algimantas Pavilonis
- Vladas Pavilonis (1932–2003), Lithuanian professor, lawyer, President of the Constitutional Court
