= Valinskas =

- Lithuanian surname
- m.: Valinskas
- f.: (unmarried): Valinskytė
- f.: (married): Valinskienė

Valinskas is a Lithuanian surname. Notable people with the surname include:

- Arūnas Valinskas (b. 1966), Lithuanian showman, TV producer, TV show host and ex-politician
- Ingrida Valinskienė (born 1966), Lithuanian singer, voice actress, and politician
- Marius Valinskas, Lithuanian basketball player
- Paulius Valinskas (b. 1995), Lithuanian basketball player for Žalgiris Kaunas
