= BC Alita =

- Founded: 1995
- Folded: 2005
- Arena: Sport Hall of Alytus (capacity: 1500)
- Team colours: Green and White

BC Alita is a defunct basketball club that was based in Alytus, Lithuania. The club was founded in 1995 when the headquarters of the basketball club BC Savy Vilnius were moved to Alytus, Lithuania as part of the geographical expansion of the Lithuanian Men's Basketball League (LKL). The team was named after its corporate sponsor, Alita, a Lithuanian beverage company.

BC Alita quickly became a notable team within the LKL. It played its home games at the Alytus Sports and Recreation Center, a modern facility that hosted numerous domestic and international basketball events.

Despite its promising start, BC Alita faced financial difficulties, which led to its dissolution in 2005. The club was succeeded by BC Alytus in the same year, which continued to represent the city in the LKL. BC Alytus aimed to build on the legacy of BC Alita, maintaining a competitive presence in Lithuanian basketball.

== Achievements ==
Year	League	Season	Play-Off	Baltic	Events	European	Events
1995–96	LKL	9	–	–	–	Korać Cup	1/32
1996–97	LKL	6	1/4	–	–	–	–
1997–98	LKL	8	1/4	–	–	–	–
1998–99	LKL	3	1/4	NEBL OPEN	7th (8)	Korać Cup	1/16
1999–00	LKL	5	1/4	NEBL OPEN	13th (14)	Korać Cup	1/16
2000–01	LKL	6	4th	NEBL Challenge	runner-up	–	–
2001–02	LKL	4	Bronze	NEBL Challenge	champion	–	–
2002–03	LKL	4	Bronze	–	–	FIBA Champions' Cup	Regional Qualifying Group
2003–04	LKL	5	1/4	–	–	FIBA Europe League	Group stage
2004–05	LKL	7	1/4	Challenge Cup	1/4	–	–

== Notable players ==
- (Lithuania) Tomas Pačėsas
- (Lithuania) Rytis Vaišvila
- (Lithuania) Gvidonas Markevičius
- (Lithuania) Algimantas Pavilonis
- (Ukraine) Stanislav Medvedenko
- (Lithuania) Darjuš Lavrinovič
- (Lithuania) Kšyštof Lavrinovič
- (Lithuania) Gintaras Kadžiulis
- (Lithuania) Žygimantas Jonušas
- (Lithuania) Tadas Klimavičius
- (Lithuania) Saulius Kazevičius
- (Lithuania) Nerijus Varnelis
