= Raimundas Čivilis =

Lithuanian basketball player (1959–2000)

- Čivilis (center) as a Žalgiris member

Personal information
- Born: 24 November 1959 Panevėžys, Lithuanian SSR, Soviet Union
- Died: 27 November 2000 (aged 41) Kaunas, Lithuania
- Listed height: 205 cm (6 ft 9 in)

Career information
- Playing career: 1977–1990
- Position: Center / power forward
- Number: 7

Career history
- ?–1977: Lietkabelis
- 1977–1988: Žalgiris
- 1989–1990: Dinamo Sliven
- 1990: BK Chemosvit

Career highlights
- FIBA Club World Cup champion (1986); 3× USSR League champion (1985–1987)

Raimundas Čivilis (24 November 1959 – 27 November 2000) was a Lithuanian professional basketball player, known for his career in Žalgiris Kaunas from 1977 to 1988.

== Life ==
Born in Panevėžys in 1959, Čivilis became a member of Žalgiris team in 1977. His early career, however, was not successful, until Vladas Garastas took the head coach's post in 1979. Garastas immediately took a liking in him and put him in the starting five. He naturally became a leader, and stayed one even after Arvydas Sabonis came to the team in 1981. In a 1985–86 FIBA European Champions Cup match in 1986, when Žalgiris was playing against Petrović's Cibona Zagreb, and Sabonis fouled out, Čivilis took over and led his team to defeat Cibona 94–91.

In 1988, he left Žalgiris, played briefly in Bulgaria and Slovakia, and retired soon afterwards. In 2000, Čivilis died of tuberculosis.
