= Jurica Žuža =

Croatian basketball player and coach

- Žuža with FC Barcelona in 2026

FC Barcelona
- Title: Assistant coach
- League: Liga ACB; EuroLeague

Personal information
- Born: 4 April 1978 (age 48) Podgradina near Zadar, SR Croatia, SFR Yugoslavia
- Listed height: 6 ft 10 in (2.08 m)

Career information
- NBA draft: 2000: undrafted
- Playing career: 1996–2016
- Position: Center

Career history

Playing
- 1996–1998: Zadar
- 1998–1999: Svjetlost Brod
- 1999–2000: Zadar
- 2000–2001: Šanac Karlovac
- 2001–2002: Iraklio
- 2002–2003: Panathinaikos
- 2003–2004: Ionikos
- 2004–2005: Crabs Rimini
- 2005–2007: Cibona
- 2007: Rethymno
- 2007–2008: Cedevita
- 2008–2009: Poltava
- 2009–2011: Kryvbasbasket
- 2011: Zadar
- 2011–2012: Tofaş
- 2012–2013: Trabzonspor
- 2013–2014: Al Rayan
- 2014–2016: Lietkabelis Panevėžys

Coaching
- 2016–2017: Lietkabelis Panevėžys (assistant)
- 2017–2020: Neptūnas Klaipėda (assistant)
- 2020: Neptūnas Klaipėda
- 2021–2022: Nymburk (assistant)
- 2022–2025: Lokomotiv Kuban (assistant)
- 2025–2026: Zenit Saint Petersburg (assistant)
- 2026–present: FC Barcelona (assistant)

Career highlights
- Greek League champion (2003); 2× Croatian League champion (2006, 2007); Turkish Second League champion (2013); 2× Croatian Cup winner (1998, 2000); Greek Cup winner (2003); Croatian League rebound leader (2001)
Medals
Men's basketball
Representing Croatia
European U-18 Championship
Gold medal – first place	1996 France	Under-18

Jurica Žuža (born April 4, 1978) is a Croatian basketball coach and former basketball player currently serving as assistant coach for FC Barcelona of the Liga ACB and the EuroLeague.

== Professional career ==
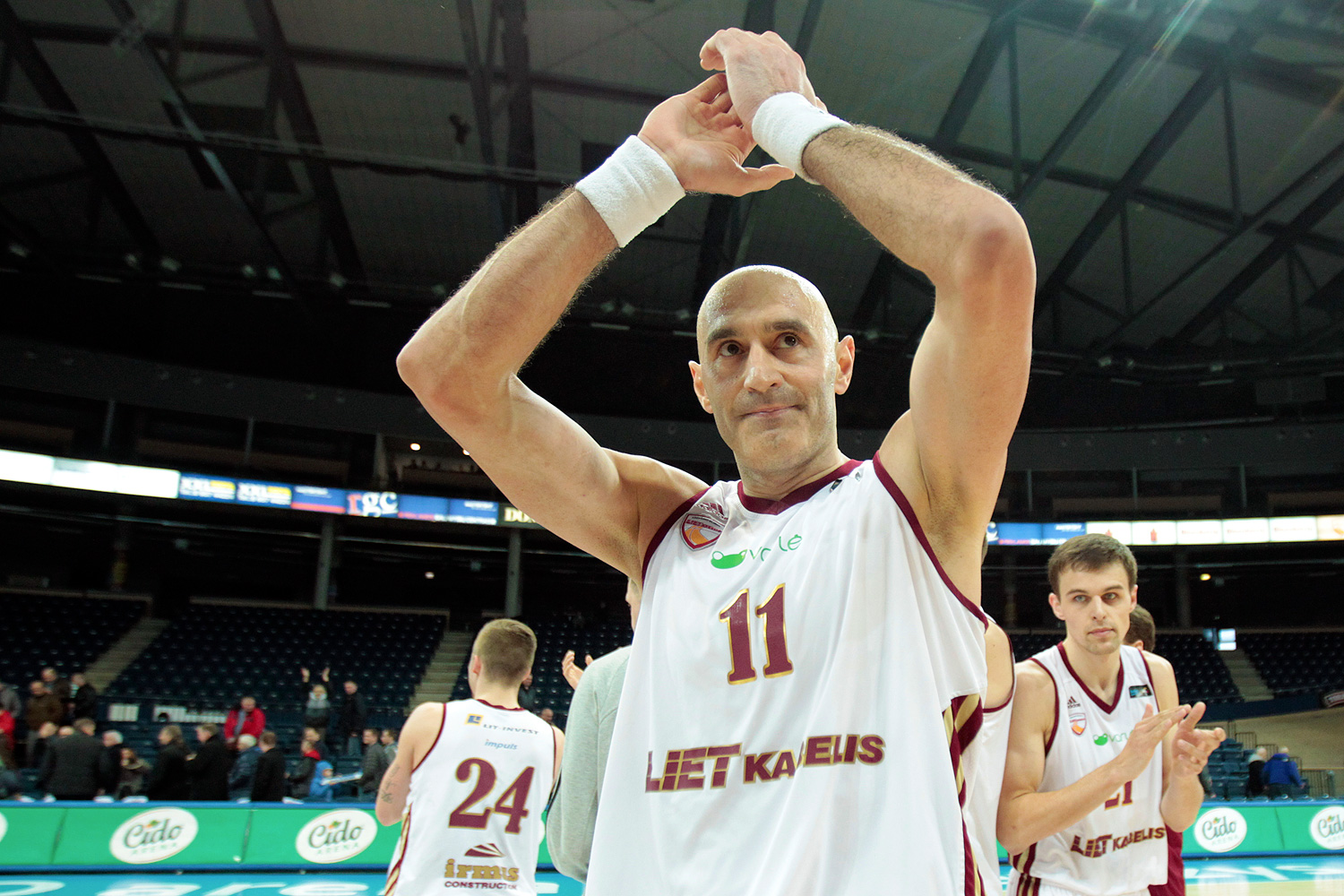
Žuža with Lietkabelis in 2015

Žuža started his professional career at Zadar under coach Danijel Jusup. After two years spent in the club and winning the 1998 Croatian Cup (first trophy for Zadar in independent Croatia), he played in Svjetlost Brod and then again in Zadar winning another Cup in 2000. After spending a season in Šanac Karlovac Žuža moved abroad to the Greek Iraklio. After that he spent a season in Panathinaikos coached by Željko Obradović during which he won the Greek League and Cup. He later spent a season in the Greek Ionikos and Italian Crabs Rimini before playing two and a half seasons for Cibona during which he became the Croatian League champion twice. After playing for the Greek Rethymno, Croatian Cedevita, Polish Poltava and Ukrainian Kryvbasbasket, during the 2010–11 season Žuža shortly again played for Zadar. Then he went to the Turkish Tofaş from Bursa and then to Trabzonspor, with whom he won the Turkish Second League. From there Žuža went to the Qatari Al Rayan, and in 2014 he made his final transfer to Lietkabelis where he played the last two seasons of his professional career. In the last season of his 20-year professional playing career Žuža helped his club win third place in the 2015–16 Baltic League.

== Coaching career ==
He began his coaching career as assistant coach for Lietkabelis, the same club he finished his playing career. Lietkabelis achieved its best result in history, finishing as runners-up in the 2016–17 Lithuanian League. The next season he was assistant coach for Neptūnas who came third in the 2017–18 Lithuanian League.

On July 20, 2022, he signed with Lokomotiv Kuban of the VTB United League.

On August 7, 2026, he joined FC Barcelona of the Liga ACB and the EuroLeague as an assistant coach in Aleksander Sekulić's staff.
