= Alita (company) =

Brewing company

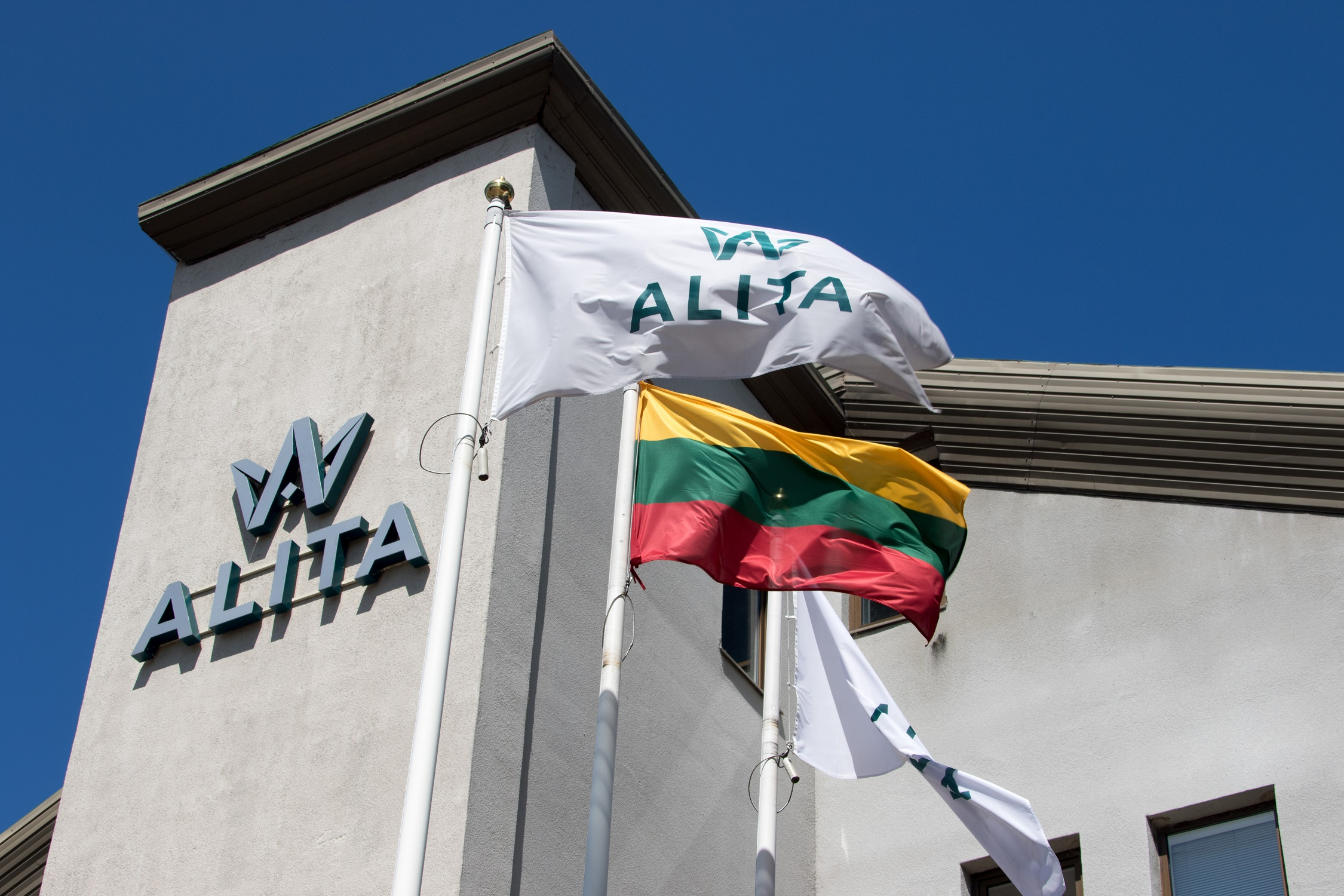
- Founded: 1963; 63 years ago in Alytus, Lithuania
- Headquarters: Alytus, Lithuania
- Products: Sparkling wine; Cider; Vodka; Brandy; Cocktails; Fruit concentrate
- Brands: Putin Vodka
- Website: alita.lt/en/

Alita is a brewing company based in Alytus, Lithuania, established in 1963.

Alita is one of the largest producers of alcoholic beverages in Lithuania. In 2004, when the state monopoly of liquor production in Lithuania was lifted, the company was privatised. In the same year, Alita acquired 95% stake of Lithuanian company Anykščių vynas, the oldest wine producer in Eastern Baltic region.

Alita produces naturally fermented sparkling grape vines, alcoholic cocktails, ciders, vodka, brandy and concentrated fruit juice and it exports its products around the world. It entered the liquors business in 1995.

In 2000, the distillery released a vodka named Putin Vodka, with a red, white, and blue label, which are the colours of the Russian flag. Sold only in Lithuania at that time, a company spokesperson said that the name had its origin in the tree "putinas" (the Lithuanian name for the genus Viburnum).

The company was the title sponsor of BC Alita, a local basketball club, which consistently competed in the top tier Lithuanian Basketball League for all its existence, in addition to various European tournaments – FIBA Korać Cup, FIBA EuroCup Challenge, and FIBA EuroChallenge.
