= BC Lietkabelis =

Basketball team in Panevėžys, Lithuania

Lietkabelis Panevėžys
- Leagues: LKL; EuroCup
- Founded: 1964; 62 years ago
- History: List: Lietkabelis 1964–1996 Kalnapilis 1996–1999 Sema 1999–2000 Panevėžys 2000–2001 Preventa-Malsena 2001–2002 Malsena 2002–2003 Aukštaitija 2003–2004 Panevėžys 2004–2007 Techasas 2007–2012 Lietkabelis 2012–2022 7bet–Lietkabelis 2022–2025 Lietkabelis 2025–present
- Arena: Kalnapilis Arena
- Capacity: 5,950
- Location: Panevėžys, Lithuania
- Team colors: Burgundy, white, pale gold
- Main sponsor: Amber Gaming (7bet)
- President: Alvydas Bieliauskas
- General manager: Jonas Mačiulis
- Head coach: Nenad Čanak
- Team captain: Vacant
- Championships: List: 2 Lithuanian SSR League champions (1985, 1988); 2 Lithuanian Basketball League silver medal winners (2017, 2022); 9 Lithuanian Basketball League bronze medal winners (1983, 1984, 1990, 1991, 2020, 2021, 2023, 2024, 2025); 1 Baltic Basketball League bronze medal winners (2016); 4 King Mindaugas Cup silver medal winners (2017), (2021), (2022), (2024); 6 King Mindaugas Cup bronze medal winners (2018), (2019), (2020), (2023), (2025), (2026)
- Website: kklietkabelis.lt
Home	Away

BC Lietkabelis (Lithuanian: Krepšinio klubas Lietkabelis), commonly known as Lietkabelis Panevėžys, is a Lithuanian professional basketball club based in Panevėžys, Lithuania, participating in the Lithuanian Basketball League and internationally in the EuroCup. The team plays its home games at Kalnapilis Arena, a multi-purpose facility that also doubles as a velodrome. Founded as Lietkabelis in 1964, the team was known by other names between 1996 and 2012. In 2012, after a change in ownership, the team's historic name was restored. It comes from the team's main sponsor, a wire and cable manufacturing company.

== History ==
=== Early years ===
The history of basketball club Lietkabelis began in 1964. The club's name did not change for 32 consecutive years. The home-court games were played in Aukštaitija Sports Palace, which was opened in 1965. The construction of the palace was initiated by V. Variakojis. Most of the team's players contributed with their own hands to the palace's construction process. At that time, the team was represented by such sports masters, such as S. Atraškevičius, J. Balakauskas, A. Butkūnas, V. Juchnevičius, E. Kuodys, A. Matačiūnas, R. Petrauskas, R. Sargūnas, V. Stalilionis, J. Zičkus, E. Žurauskas, V. Variakojis and others. Until the establishment of the Lithuanian Basketball League in 1993, Lietkabelis was among the country's strongest basketball teams. During these times, Panevėžys club, trained by R. Sargūnas and V. Paškauskas from 1964 to 1996, became Lithuania's champions twice (1985, 1988), won third place three times (1983, 1984 and 1991) and qualified into the Lithuania's Cup competition finals two times (1985, 1986). Other performances are as follows: 1964, 1965, 1968 and 1989 – 5th places, 1966 and 1969 – 6th places, 1970, 1971, 1980, 1986 and 1993 – 7th places, 1973 and 1977 – 11-12 places, 1975 – 11th place, 1976 – 9-10 places, 1979 – 9th place, 1981 – 8th place and 1982, 1987, 1990, 1992 – 4th places.

=== 1978–1986: playing in USSR Division I ===
From 1978 to 1986, Lietkabelis represented Lithuania in USSR I division tournament (second-tier competition in the Soviet Union). In more than three decades, many notable basketball persons played for the Panevėžys' team: Algimantas Baziukas, Algirdas Brazys, Raimundas Čivilis, V. Dambrauskas, A. Kairys, M. Karnišovas, Jonas Kazlauskas, Algirdas Kriščiūnas, Rimas Kurtinaitis, Vitoldas Masalskis, O. Moisejenka, Gintaras Leonavičius, Rolandas Penikas, Algimantas Pavilonis, A. Šidlauskas and others. Notable boarding sports school members, who later been a part of the Lithuania national basketball team, trained their skills in Lietkabelis. Such players are: Gintaras Einikis, Dainius Adomaitis, Alvydas Pazdrazdis, Romanas Brazdauskis, Gvidonas Markevičius and others. The team long-time was coached by V. Stankevičius, a Lietkabelis factory director. The factory was the team's main sponsor.

=== 1993: Creating the Lithuanian Basketball League ===
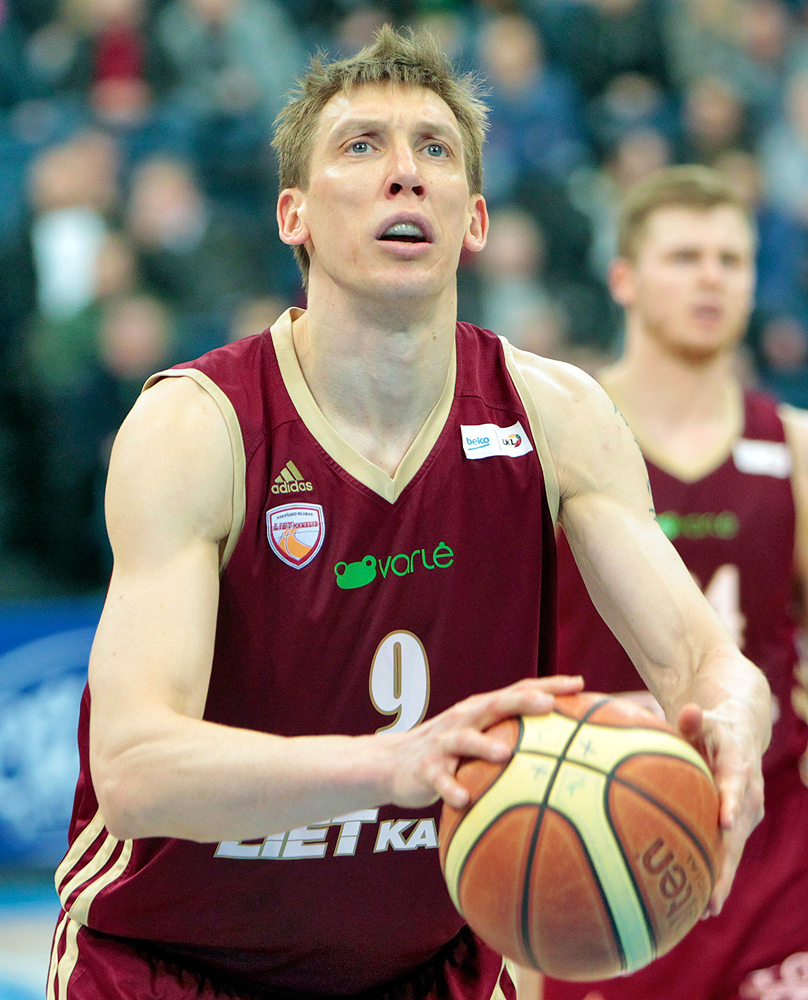
Dainius Šalenga as a Lietkabelis member in 2015

In 1993, basketball club Lietkabelis was one of the eight Lithuanian Basketball League founders. From 1996, after three decades, Lietkabelis factory left basketball world. The team's names were changing constantly: Kalnapilis (1996–1999), Sema (1999–2000), Panevėžys (2000–2001 ir 2004–2007), Preventa-Malsena (2001–2003), Aukštaitija (2003–2004) and Techasas (2007–2012). From January 2012, club's name reverted to the legendary one – Lietkabelis. In 20 LKL seasons the team's jersey was worn by such notable Lithuanian basketball players: Gintaras Bačianskas (19,7 points per game in LKL), Gintaras Kadžiulis, Kęstutis Kemzūra, Mindaugas Lukauskis, Paulius Staškūnas, Žydrūnas Urbonas and others.

In the 1999–2000 season, Panevėžys team (named Sema at that time) participated in international tournament – FIBA Korać Cup for the first time after the country's independence. In 2004–2005 season and from 2007 to 2012, Panevėžys team participated in Baltic Basketball League's second division (renamed to BBL Challenge Cup in 2007). They also played in the BBL Elite Division from 2005 to 2007 and from 2012 to 2014. During ten years in this league, the team achieved first place twice in the BBL Challenge Cup (in 2005 as Panevėžys and in 2012 as Lietkabelis), they also won bronze medals twice as well (in 2008 and 2011 as Techasas). They won the BBL Elite Division, they won the bronze medals in 2016. In the LKL, the highest the team achieved was the quarterfinals, though they did come close in 2007 to reaching the semifinals, losing a very tough series to BC Šiauliai 1–2. In 2016, they also had a tough series against BC Lietuvos rytas, fighting hard in a losing sweep, though only lost the two away games in Vilnius 74–79 and 78–83.

In October 2008, the brand-new Cido Arena was opened in Panevėžys, which has 5656 seats for the basketball spectators. It became new Panevėžys basketball team home-hourt, replacing the Aukštaitija Sports Palace after 43 years.

In October 2011, then club owner Darius Gaudiešius transferred the basketball club to a trio of businessmen - Algirdas Kriščiūnas, Antanas Kazys Liorentas and Kazimieras Antanynas, the latter related to the now-defunct Ūkio bankas. In January 2012, the team's old name, Lietkabelis, was restored.

=== 2015–2020: resurgence and participating in European competitions ===
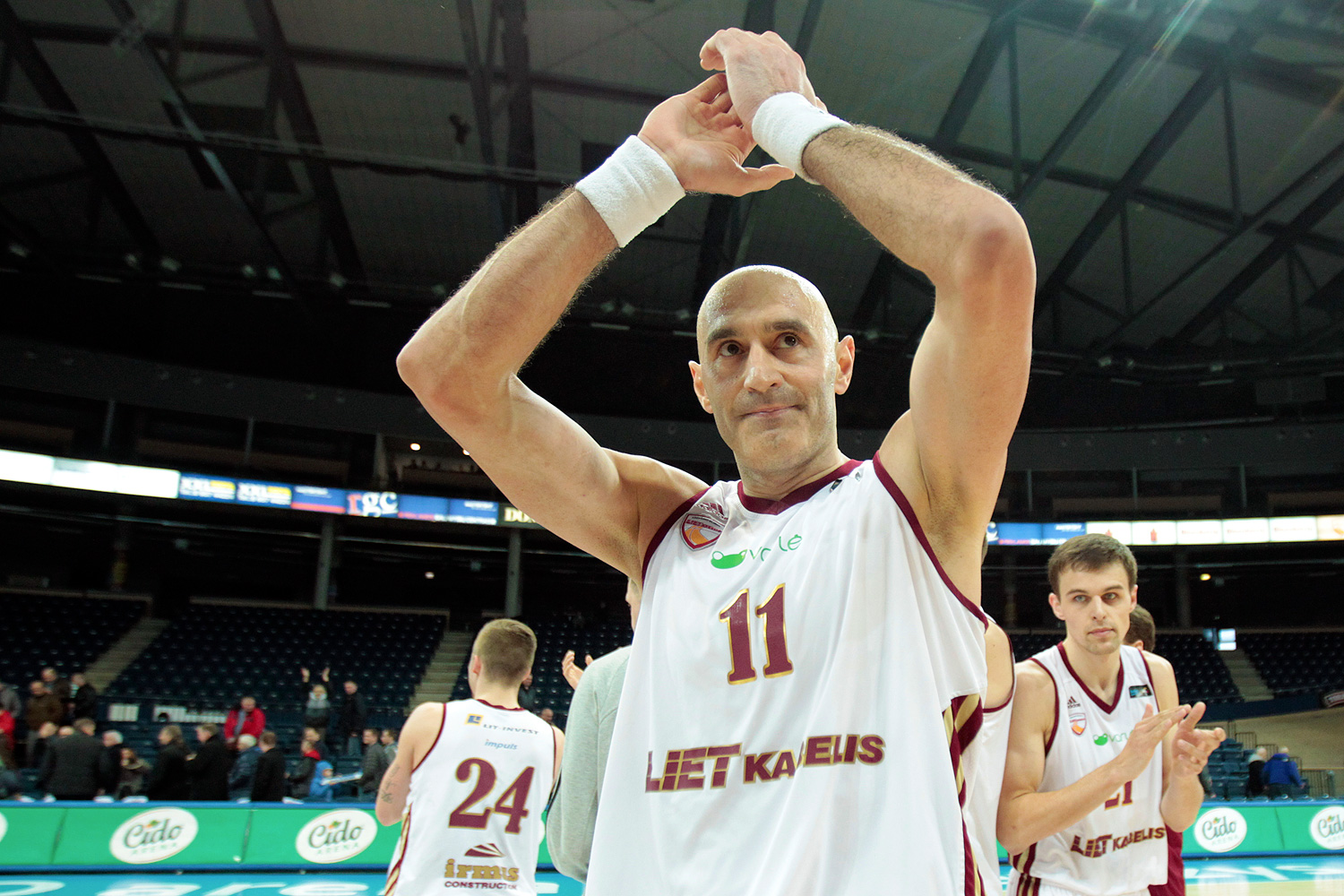
Jurica Žuža, former player of the Panathinaikos B.C., with teammates of the Lietkabelis Panevėžys in 2015

On 29 July 2015, the club was invited to join the FIBA Europe Cup tournament, which is the alternative version of the 2nd tier European tournament EuroCup, organized by FIBA. However, just before the drawning ceremony, it was announced that 56 teams would participate instead of 64 and Lietkabelis was not one of these.

On 21 July 2016, Lietkabelis was invited to play in the 2016–17 EuroCup season. The club previously registered again in the FIBA Europe Cup. Following it, the team signed notable veterans: Mindaugas Lukauskis, Kšyštof Lavrinovič and Darjuš Lavrinovič who formed the core of the team. The positive preseason resulted in record sales of over 700 season tickets just on the sales opening day. The LKL season began historically by defeating Žalgiris Kaunas 90–86 for the first time after 16 years. This season became the best one in club history - Lietkabelis had astonishing victories over Žalgiris, BC Lietuvos rytas and BC Neptūnas, the top teams in Lithuania. In the playoffs, Lietkabelis beat BC Vytautas in the quarterfinals 3–0, then shocked Lietuvos rytas 3–1 in the semifinals before losing to Žalgiris in the LKL finals 1–4. Lietkabelis also reached the 2017 King Mindaugas Cup finals, also losing to Žalgiris 63–84. During the season, and the playoffs, Lietkabelis broke many attendance records in Panevėžys.

The debut EuroCup season performance was not less pleasant for the club. On 12 October 2016, Donatas Tarolis buzzer-beater guaranteed Lietkabelis first 89–88 EuroCup victory in the history of the club against KK MZT Skopje. Lietkabelis continued their success in Zagreb, defeating the Croatian champions KK Cedevita 80–76. Another remarkable play was performed by Donatas Tarolis, whose put-back slam secured the victory with just 13 seconds remaining. On 23 November, the record of attendance was achieved, with 4427 spectators during the second game versus Cedevita, though Lietkabelis lost a tough rematch 68–69. Lietkabelis qualified to the Eurocup Top16, with a 3–5 record in the group stage with another win against MZT Skopje, though lost both games to the top teams in the group - CB Gran Canaria and BC Nizhny Novgorod. Lietkabelis played in Group F against former tournament champion BC Khimki, and German giants Bayern Munich and ratiopharm Ulm. While Lietkabelis did not manage to defeat Khimki and Bayern, they won both games against a powerful ratiopharm Ulm team, and finished the Eurocup Top16 phase with a respectable 2–4 record.

On 13 June 2017, it was announced that in the 2017–2018 season Lietkabelis for a second straight time will participate in the EuroCup competition. Consequently, the team successfully extended contracts with the Lavrinovič twins, signed former long-term Lithuania men's national basketball team member Simas Jasaitis and candidate of the national team Adas Juškevičius, who later played during the EuroBasket 2017. The team retained their respectable status by starting the 2017–18 LKL season with a perfect 8–0 record and the 2017–18 EuroCup season by defeating the Israeli League champions Hapoel Jerusalem 86–72. The struggles began for the team after the second game in the Eurocup - a crushing away defeat to Bayern Munich 57–93. After a loss at home to Grissin Bon Reggio Emilia 75–82, Lietkabelis rebounded with a surprising away win against Galatasaray Odeabank 78–73 and a win at home against KK Budućnost 86–79, after a strong performance by Adas Juškevičius, who scored 32 points and hit 9 three-pointers, 7 of which came in the first quarter. After the first round of the Eurocup, Lietkabelis had a 3–2 record. The second round became a disaster – Lietkabelis lost an away game to Hapoel 81–93, followed by a loss to FC Bayern 87–88 at home. Head coach Artūrs Štālbergs was shockingly fired after a few upset losses in the LKL, replaced by assistant Vitaliy Cherniy. Lietkabelis shocked Grissin Bon with an 85–82 away win in Reggio Emilia after the changes, but that did not save the team. Tough losses to Galatasaray 77–84 at home, and 62–76 to KK Budućnost in Podgorica left Lietkabelis with a 4–6 record and a game out of the Top16 round, ending the competition in disappointment.

In the LKL, after an 8–0 start, which included dominating wins against Lietuvos rytas 97–81 at Vilnius and a home win over Neptūnas 88–76, Lietkabelis climbed to 1st place in the standings. The streak was snapped by Žalgiris in Kaunas, 90–92. After a shocking loss to BC Vytautas, the last place team in the LKL, coach Štālbergs was fired. Assistant coach Cherniy briefly took over, before Ramūnas Butautas took over as head coach. Point guards Gary Talton and Adas Juškevičius left the team, and were replaced by the talented Arnas Velička and Dominik Mavra. In the 2018 King Mindaugas Cup, Lietkabelis defeated BC Pieno žvaigždės 86–76 in the quarterfinals, qualifying to the Final Four. Facing Žalgiris in a previous year's finals rematch, Lietkabelis lost 74–88, and defeated BC Dzūkija in a hard-fought game 81–78 to win third place. What followed was a string of losses in the LKL, with Lietkabelis quickly falling out of contention for first place in the standings. Losses to Lietuvos rytas and Neptūnas meant the team finished only fourth in the regular season, a disappointing finish. In the playoffs, Lietkabelis defeated BC Šiauliai 3–1 in the quarterfinals, thanks to veteran leadership and a great series by team leader Žanis Peiners. In the semifinals, Lietkabelis faced Žalgiris - by this point, Lietkabelis was no match against the LKL champions and one of the best teams in the Euroleague, and lost the series in a disappointing 0–3 fashion. In the third place series, Lietkabelis faced BC Neptūnas, coached by Kazys Maksvytis, who a season before coached Lietkabelis to the Eurocup Top16, and the finals of both LKL and KMT. After winning the first game in Klaipėda, 83–69, Lietkabelis lost at home 69–71. Donatas Tarolis had the best game of his career, finishing with a double-double of 26 points and 10 rebounds. Neptūnas went on to win the next two games, 79–71 at home and a second 89–78 win in Panevėžys. Lietkabelis suffered disappointment, losing the series 1–3, and finishing in fourth place.

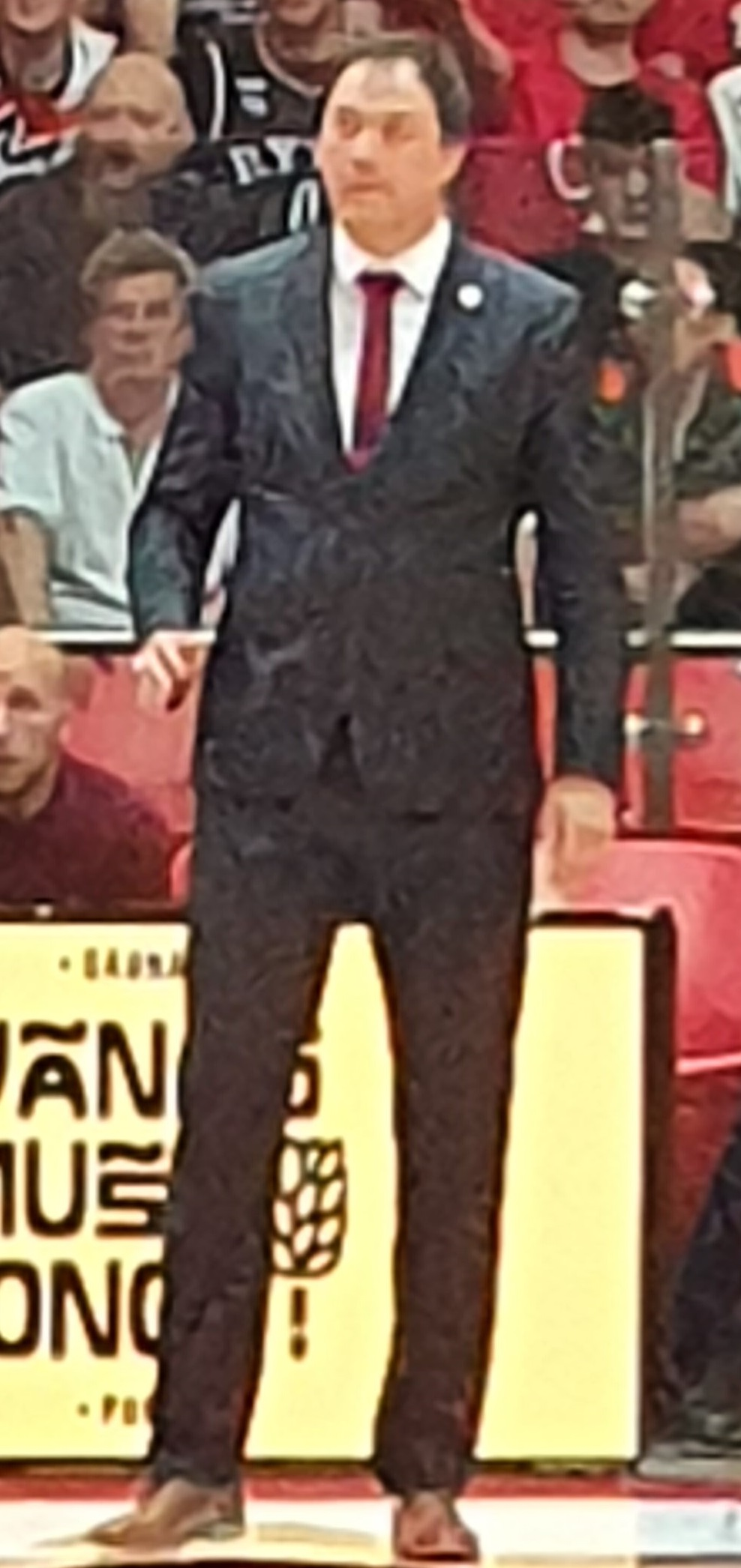
Nenad Čanak started coaching the team in 2018 and achieved many notable victories

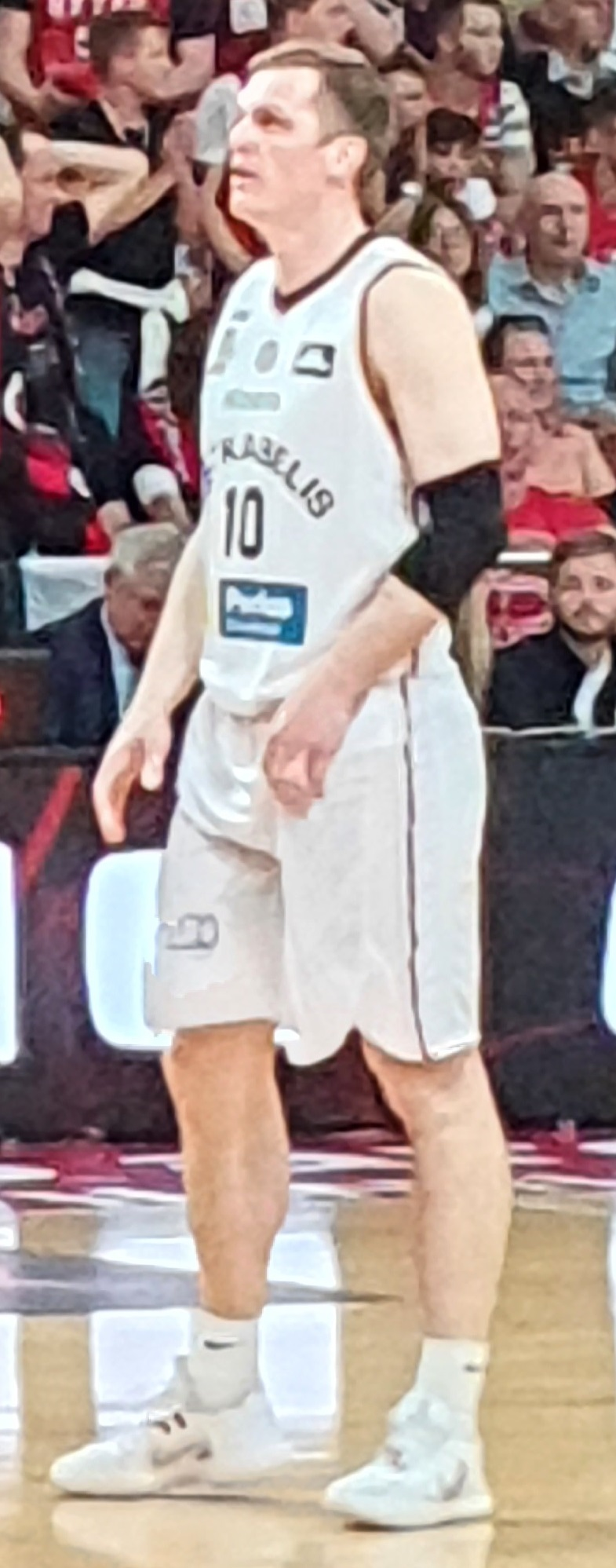
Vytenis Lipkevičius signed with the team in 2019 and was one of the team leaders for multiple seasons

The finish in the LKL prevented Lietkabelis from playing in the Eurocup. The team then moved to FIBA, to the Basketball Champions League. Initially, Lietkabelis was supposed play in the qualifying round, but after one of the teams, Eskişehir, announced withdrew from the competition, Lietkabelis earned a place in the 2018–19 Basketball Champions League regular season, joining group C along with defending champion AEK Athens, Antwerp Giants, ČEZ Nymburk, Montakit Fuenlabrada, Hapoel Jerusalem, JDA Dijon and last year's Euroleague participant Brose Bamberg. Much of the roster of the previous season left, with the biggest losses being the Lavrinovič twins, Peiners, Lorenzo Williams. Simas Jasaitis remained with Lietkabelis, and was named the team captain. Lietkabelis then signed solid players like point guard Jamar Wilson, center Mike Morrison, guards Fran Pilepić and Paulius Valinskas from Žalgiris, forwards Vytenis Lipkevičius and Saulius Kulvietis and center from Juventus Mindaugas Kupšas. Longtime club player Ernestas Ežerskis also returned to the team. Longtime assistant Gintaras Kadžiulis was named the head coach. Despite having one of the strongest teams in the LKL, by November, Lietkabelis was only in fourth place. In the Champions League, Lietkabelis suffered losses at home to Antwerp Giants 87–91, and away losses to Hapoel Jerusalem 67–81 and Brose Bamberg 77–82, only scoring one win against ČEZ Nymburk at home, 97–86. At this point, Lietkabelis was 1–3. Changes were made, first by bringing in Jonas Vainauskas, the man behind much of BC Rytas success, as sports director. After the loss in Bamberg, Gintaras Kadžiulis was replaced in the coaching position by Nenad Čanak. Vainauskas as sports director only lasted for two months - until his termination on 28 December 2018. During his tenure, Vainauskas made a lot of changes within the team - Lipkevičius, Ežerskis, Morrison and Pilepić all left and were replaced by guards Stefan Sinovec, Marko Čakarević, Davis Lejasmeiers, center Žiga Dimec and new point guard Vaidas Kariniauskas, who played for the team in the 2014 season, Vainauskas also wanted to release Wilson, but he remained with the team. The results were mixed - in the Champions League, the changes helped the team finish the first round strong, with home wins over JDA Dijon 78–62, and Montakit Fuenlabrada 78–67, with only one loss away to champions AEK Athens, 59–65, and with a 3–4 record, were in a playoff position. During Vainauskas tenure, Lietkabelis also defeated Rytas in an away match in Vilnius, 94–83. During December–March, turmoil followed - Kariniauskas was released in controversial fashion, the results continued to decline at an enormous rate. Lietkabelis only won two games out of seven in the second round of the Champions League, finishing with a 5–9 record, fifth place, and out of the playoffs. In the LKL, Lietkabelis struggled so much, that cross-town rival BC Pieno žvaigždės actually tied for fourth place and for a brief time, Lietkabelis fell to fifth. The signing of Ike Iroegbu helped the team. Lietkabelis won third place in the King Mindaugas Cup. Success against BC Neptūnas and BC Rytas, who Lietkabelis beat in the season series, helped Lietkabelis regain fourth place, at 23–13. Valinskas heavily improved during this time, becoming one of the team leaders. Lietkabelis beat Pieno žvaigždės 2–0 in the quarterfinals. In the LKL semifinals, Lietkabelis was no match against Žalgiris Kaunas, losing 0–2. In the third place series, Lietkabelis lost to Neptūnas 0–3.

During the summer, Kupšas, Dimec, Wilson, Tarolis, Valinskas and Iroegbu all left the team. Lietkabelis signed Martynas Sajus, Femi Olujobi and Željko Šakić as the front court. Lietkabelis also signed Tomas Lekūnas, from BC Pieno žvaigždės, and Tomas Dimša from BC Juventus, and Gabrielius Maldūnas from BC Nevėžis, who had great games against Lietkabelis in the previous LKL season. Ken Brown was signed to replace Wilson as the new point guard. Margiris Normantas was signed after a great showing in the pre-season. Marius Valinskas, brother of Paulius, signed to a long-term contract in the summer. Coach Čanak remained with the team. Lietkabelis qualified for the 2019–20 Basketball Champions League by defeating Keravnos in the qualifying round, on aggregate 148-137 (71–55 away, and 77–82 at home). Playing in Group A, along with Türk Telekom, Dinamo Sassari, Baxi Manresa, Hapoel Holon, SIG Strasbourg, Filou Oostende and Polski Cukier Toruń, Lietkabelis started the regular season 0–4. Brown was released due to erratic play, and Paulius Valinskas returned to the team in November. Lietkabelis then made a miraculous comeback in the competition, sparked by amazing play by Šakić and Dimša, and on the final day of the regular season, an away win over Hapoel Holon 69–68, helped Lietkabelis reach the Champions League playoffs for the first time in club history, with a 7–7 record. Olujobi was released and replaced by Gilvydas Biruta, while Rihards Kuksiks replaced Lekūnas, out due to a season ending injury. In the Champions League, Lietkabelis lost to Casademont Zaragoza 0–2, and were eliminated from the tournament. Owing to the Coronavirus pandemic, the LKL season was ended prematurely - in a hugely disappointing development, Lietkabelis suffered what at first seemed an insignificant loss to BC Pieno žvaigždės before the pandemic - the loss, though, allowed Rytas Vilnius to finish the season second, one win over Lietkabelis, who finished in third place. In the King Mindaugas Cup, Lietkabelis also won third place. Much of the roster departed during the summer, in particular Šakić and Dimša, team leaders, being the most painful departures. Coach Čanak remained with the team.

=== 2020-present: EuroCup years ===
Lietkabelis was invited to join the EuroCup after Rytas left for the FIBA Basketball Champions League during the summer of 2020. Playing in a very strong group, with Virtus Segafredo Bologna, Lokomotiv Kuban, AS Monaco, MoraBanc Andorra and Telenet Giants Antwerp, Lietkabelis finished the season with 2–8 record, one win away from qualification to the Top 16 phase. Kyle Vinales and Margiris Normantas were team leaders during EuroCup season, with players like Gytis Masiulis and late season signing Đorđe Gagić also having some strong games. Lietkabelis managed to reach the finals of the King Mindaugas Cup, where they lost to Žalgiris Kaunas 69–76. In the LKL, Lietkabelis lost to Rytas Vilnius 0-3 in the semifinals, but won third place for the second season in a row, by beating BC Juventus 3–2 in the bronze medal series, qualifying once again for the EuroCup for the next season.

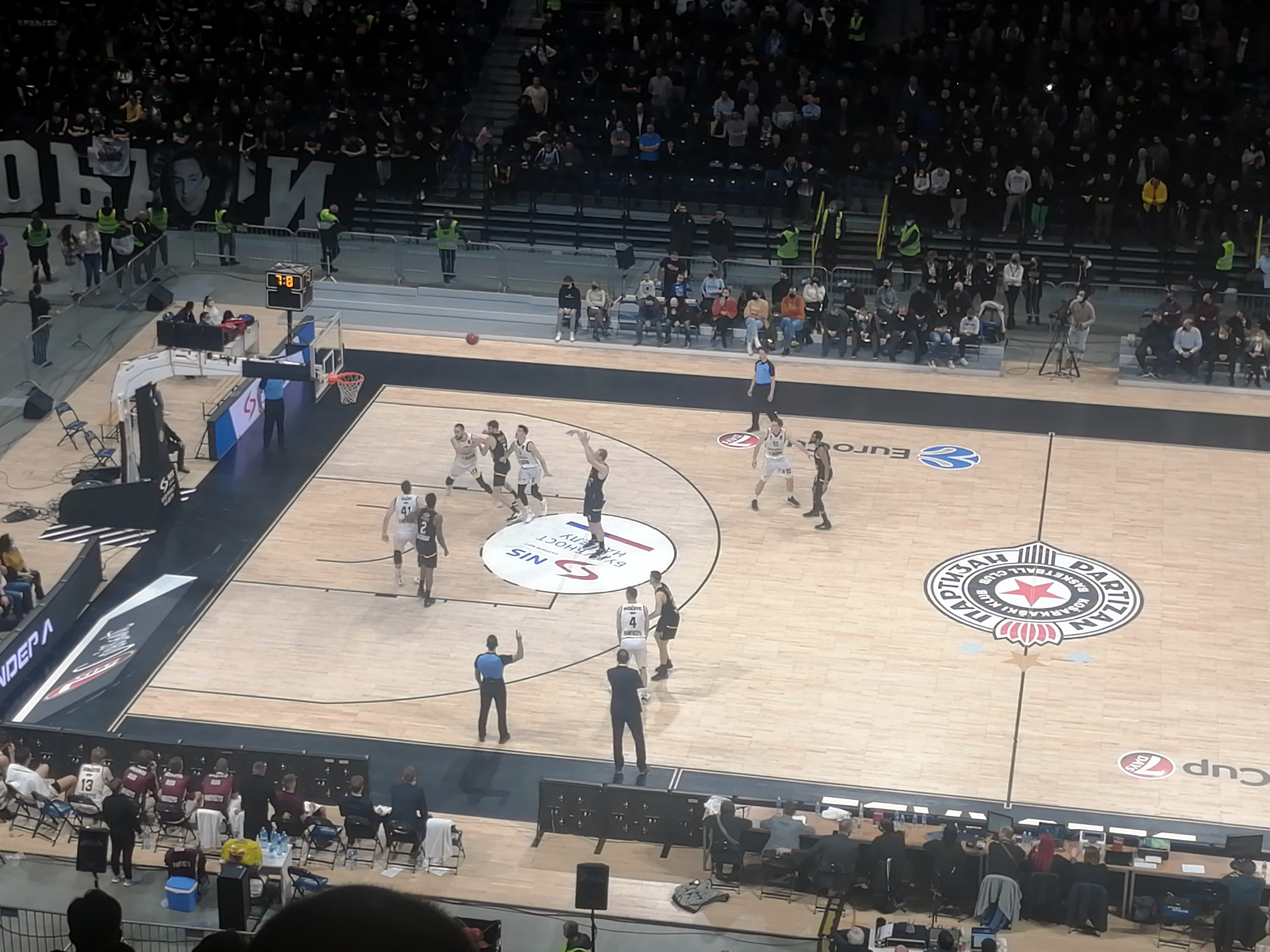
Lietkabelis Panevėžys playing an away game of the 2021–22 EuroCup season versus the KK Partizan in Belgrade

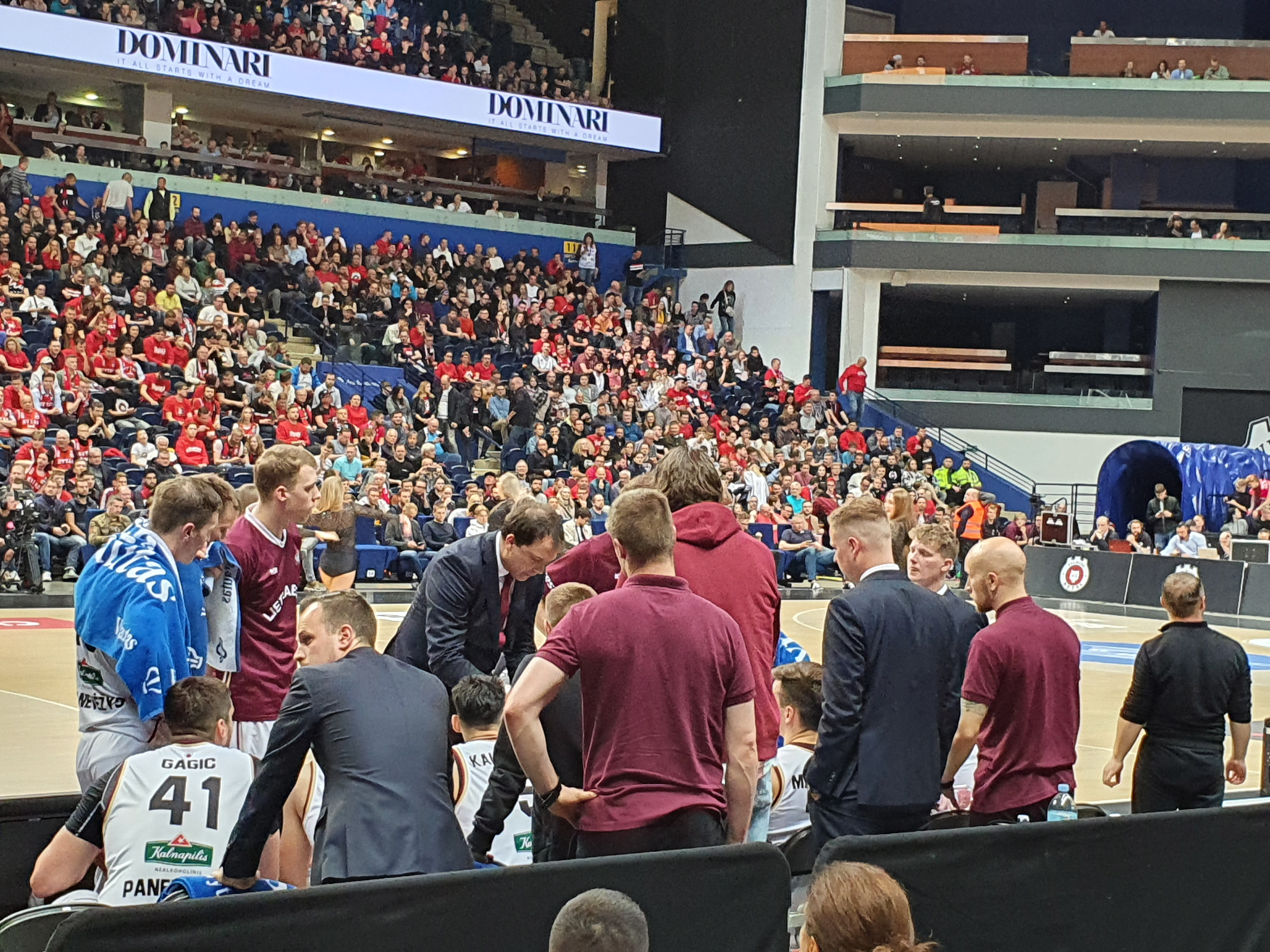
Time-out meeting of the Lietkabelis Panevėžys during the 2022 LKL Finals

During the summer of the 2021, many players departed from the team. Normantas returned to Rytas, while Masiulis, Vinales, Valinskas, and many other important players for the team leaving. Coach Čanak remained with the team. During the summer, Lietkabelis signed Gediminas Orelik, Dovydas Giedraitis, Karolis Giedraitis, Nikola Radičević, Kaspars Bērziņš, Kristupas Žemaitis, also re-signed Lipkevičius, Maldūnas and Gagić to new contracts. Panagiotis Kalaitzakis, one of the best players during the LKL playoffs, also re-signed. While the team was largely considered good for the LKL, in the EuroCup, Lietkabelis, on paper, looked like one of the weakest teams in the competition. Facing the strongest possible competition, Juventut Badalona, Lokomotiv Kuban (disqualified during the season due to Russia's invasion of Ukraine), Partizan NIS, Metropolitans 92, MoraBanc Andorra, Türk Telekom, Hamburg Towers, and Dolomiti Energia Trento, Lietkabelis shocked everyone - dominant home wins over Juventut, Partizan, Andorra and Metropolitans, great performances even in away games (during the previous season, Lietkabelis had lost all away games), and a 9–7 record helped Lietkabelis reach the EuroCup playoffs. Orelik, Dovydas Giedraitis, Kalaitzakis, Žemaitis had their best seasons of their careers, players like Lipkevičius and Gagić had their resurgence as well. In the EuroCup playoffs, Lietkabelis faced Virtus Segafredo Bologna, fighting to the very end before losing 67–75, to a team that went on to win the EuroCup later during the season. In the LKL, Lietkabelis initially had some struggles, though quickly became one of the top teams at the standings as the season progressed. In the King Mindaugas Cup, Lietkabelis also had a great run. Playing in Vilnius, without Gagić, out due to COVID, and an injury to top point guard Radičević, Lietkabelis faced the hosts Rytas Vilnius in the semifinals, also one of the favorites of the tournament. Down even in double figures, Lietkabelis fought back, and managed to shock Rytas with an 82–80 win to qualify for the finals - for the second year in a row. During the game, much of the crowd actually started cheering for Lietkabelis. In the finals, Lietkabelis faced Žalgiris Kaunas. Having almost no front court, Lietkabelis was destroyed in the paint, and lost the finals 66–91 to Žalgiris. In the LKL, however, Lietkabelis looked to make history - a dominant win against Žalgiris 85–67, in April, assured that Lietkabelis would face Žalgiris again in the LKL semifinals, as Žalgiris would fail to win the LKL regular season. In the LKL playoffs, Lietkabelis beat BC Juventus 3–0 in the quarterfinals. At the start of the semifinals, Lietkabelis lost the first game to Žalgiris 70–71, in controversial fashion, in Kaunas. In Panevėžys, however, Lietkabelis made a comeback - Lietkabelis dominated the game to win 79–55, the biggest loss for Žalgiris ever in the semifinals. In Kaunas, during the third game of the series, Lietkabelis showed why they went so far the EuroCup - down by double digits for most of the game, a huge run in the fourth quarter helped Lietkabelis take a shocking 73–69 away win over Žalgiris, with Lietkabelis taking the lead in the series. In Panevėžys, Lietkabelis did what no other team for almost 30 years in the LKL had done - an 86–75 win over Žalgiris, a 3–1 series win ended the historic 11-year run of Žalgiris as LKL champions, and for the first time in history, Žalgiris had failed to make the LKL finals. Lietkabelis also saw many huge crowds during the series, and qualified to the LKL finals for the second time, after 2017. In the LKL finals, Lietkabelis faced Rytas Vilnius, and in the first game of the series, shocked Rytas with a 77–68 victory in Vilnius. However, that would be it for Lietkabelis, as Rytas won the next four games and won the series 4–1. Despite the loss, Lietkabelis returned to the city as heroes, with thousands of fans showing up to support the team for their amazing efforts during the season. Lietkabelis once again earned a spot in the EuroCup, for the 2022–2023 season.

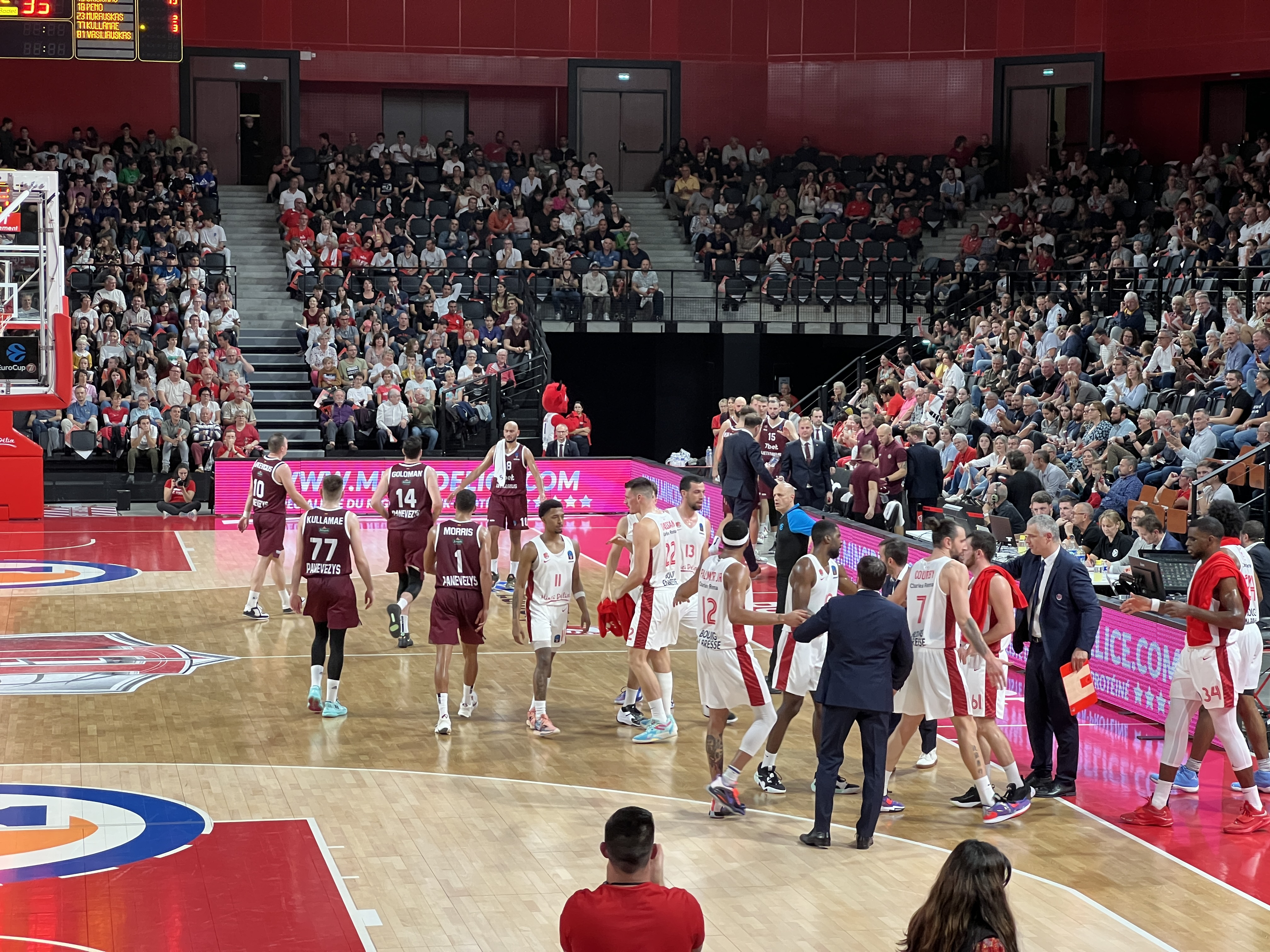
Lietkabelis Panevėžys playing an away game of the 2022–23 EuroCup season versus the JL Bourg Basket

Čanak remained as head coach for the team, while a large part of the team departed - out of all the key players, only Maldūnas and Lipkevičius remained with the team, as Lietkabelis essentially was forced to rebuild the team from scratch. Kristian Kullamäe, the returning Željko Šakić and Jamel Morris were signed, all immediately becoming among the leaders for Lietkabelis. Lietkabelis also loaned, from Žalgiris, Mantas Rubštavičius, former Lietkabelis player, and Paulius Murauskas, talented young players. Stefan Peno was signed as the team's new point guard, while Benas Griciūnas, fresh of a career season in BC Neptūnas, was signed to replace Gagič. In the Eurocup, Lietkabelis faced strong competition in Prometey Slobozhanske, Juventut Badalona, Ratiopharm Ulm, JL Bourg Basket, Umana Reyer Venezia, Germani Brescia, Frutti Extra Bursaspor, U-BT Cluj-Napoca and Cedevita Olimpija - a very even group. After the first 11 games, Lietkabelis had a 4–7 record. A mid-season return from Gediminas Orelik, fresh of an unsuccessful stint in Beşiktaş, returned to Lietkabelis. What followed, was a 6-game win streak, which included some incredible clutch performances from Morris, a record for Lietkabelis in European competitions, which helped Lietkabelis finish with a 10–8 record, fourth place in the group, only behind, Prometey, Juventut and Ratiopharm, earning a playoff berth with home-court advantage. In the EuroCup playoffs, Lietkabelis faced Paris Basketball, in Panevėžys - in a game that went to the final seconds, Paris managed to beat Lietkabelis 98–97, with a controversial call at the end of the game where Šakić managed to score a half-court heave, seemingly fouled - but the referees not calling a foul, ending the EuroCup season for Lietkabelis in heart-break. In the King Mindaugas Cup, Lietkabelis reached the Final Four by easily beating BC Juventus in the quarterfinals, winning both games 85–81 away and a dominating 109–73 at home. In the semifinals, held in Šiauliai, Lietkabelis faced off Žalgiris Kaunas, who beat Lietkabelis 77–67, leading pretty much all the way, preventing Lietkabelis from reaching their third consecutive KMT finals. In the bronze medal game, Lietkabelis faced LKL champions Rytas Vilnius, who were upset in the semifinals by CBet Jonava - Lietkabelis led by double digits much of the game, before a late game surge by Rytas took the game to the decisive seconds - Lietkabelis managed to hold on to win 91–88 and winning the bronze medals. In the LKL, Lietkabelis fought not only Žalgris and Rytas, but also the newly established BC Wolves at the top of the standings. Lietkabelis lost the season series against Wolves, who took third place, while Lietkabelis finished fourth in the standings. Lietkabelis also made a few changes in the roster - Griciūnas was replaced by Nikola Popovič, while Peno, who was largely replaced by Kullamäe in the point guard position, was released and replaced by Jorden Duffy. In the LKL playoffs, Lietkabelis faced Juventus in the quarterfinals - Lietkabelis had beaten Juvenus decisively in the KMT playoffs. In the LKL playoffs, Juventus, led by late season addition Jon Davies, proved to be a very tough challenge for Lietkabelis - Lietkabelis beat Juventus 85–73 at home, but in Utena, Juventus tied the series with an 86–77 win at home. The decisive game in Panevėžys proved to be a classic - Juventus lead much of the game, in double digits, before Lietkabelis made a comeback - beating Juventus 101–99 and winning the series 2–1. In the semifinals, Lietkabelis faced Žalgiris - memories of the previous season's triumph were still fresh in the minds of Lietkabelis fans. This Žalgiris, however, was much different from the previous season's team - while still coached by former Lietkabelis coach Kazys Maksvytis, Žalgiris had made a lot of changes during the summer and reached the Euroleague playoffs. Lietkabelis had beaten Žalgiris 87–85 at home in the final game of the LKL regular season, which did not impact the standings as Žalgiris had finished first in the LKL regular season. In the first game, Žalgiris beat Lietkabelis 69–58 at home. In Panevėžys, Lietkabelis lead the game by as much as 17 points, but unlike the previous season, Žalgiris made a comeback - Žalgiris beat Lietkabelis 86–83, in another heart-breaking loss of the season for Lietkabelis. Lietkabelis made adjustments, and this time, themselves erased a double-digit deficit in Kaunas to beat Žalgiris 67–66. In Panevėžys, Lietkabelis fans held out for hope that Lietkabelis would tie the series and bring the deciding game back to Kaunas - however, this was not to be. Žalgiris dominated, building the lead with each quarter, and finished off Lietkabelis 95–66 to win the series 3–1 and return to the finals, getting revenge for the previous season. In the bronze medal series, Lietkabelis faced off CBet Jonava, coached by Virginijus Šeškus - Lietkabelis were considered heavy favorites, and had home-court advantage. This proved to be irrelevant from the very first game of the series, as CBet shocked Lietkabelis 89–80 in Panevėžys. Lietkabelis recovered, beating CBet in Jonava on a Morris buzzer-beater 88–87 to tie the series. While many considered this as the turning point of the series, CBet once again shocked Lietkabelis in Panevėžys, with a big 82–63 win to once again take the lead in the series. Lietkabelis, needing to respond, recovered and managed to pull out a dominating 75–55 win in front off a sellout crowd in Jonava to tie the series 2–2 and setting up a deciding clash for the bronze medals. The final game was played in Šiauliai, as the home-court of Lietkabelis was unavailable to other arrangements - thousands of Lietkabelis fans travelled to Šiauliai to support the team, and with the fans support, Lietkabelis managed to beat CBet 84–72 to win the series 3–2 and win the LKL bronze medals for the season. After the game, coach Čanak departed from Lietkabelis.

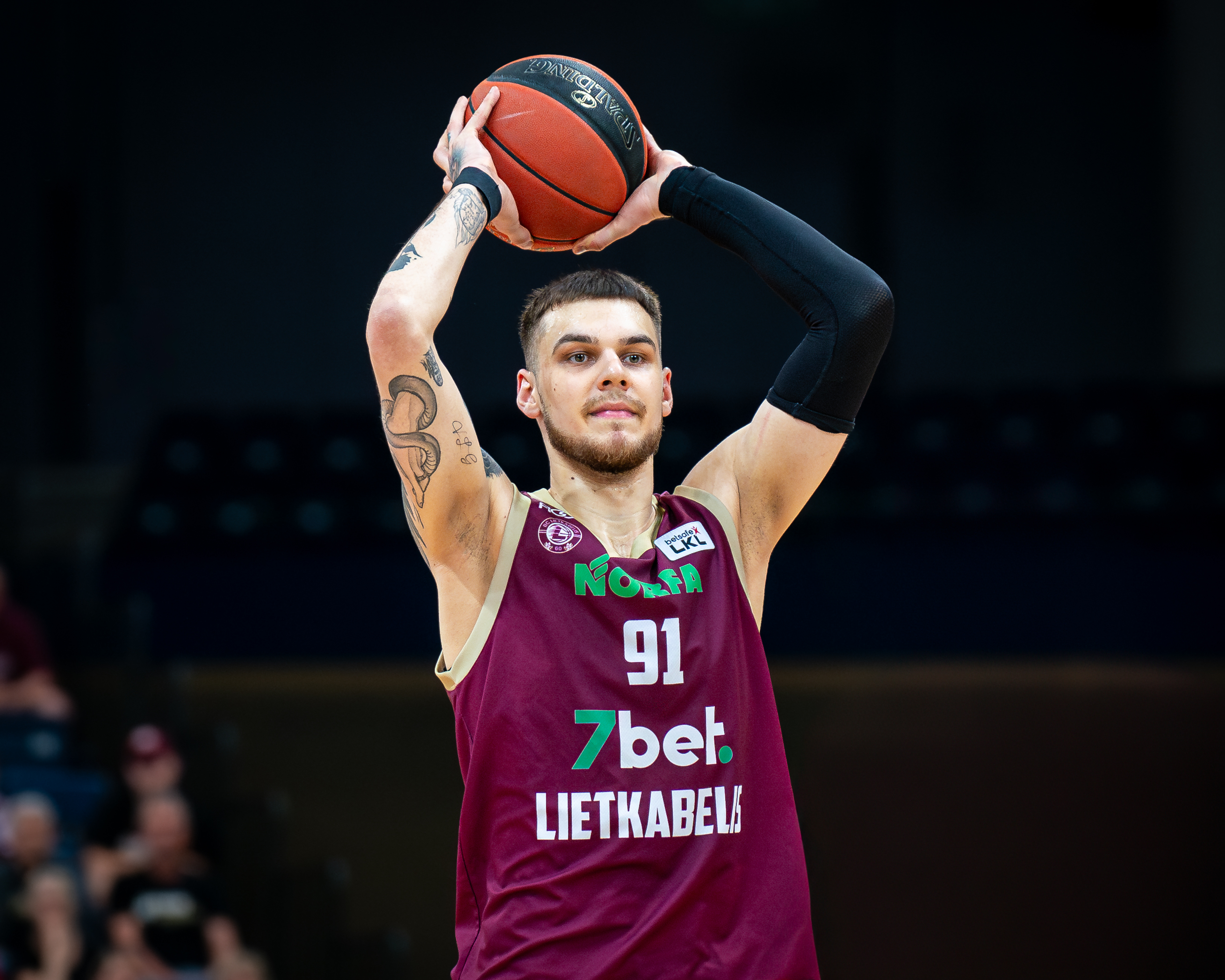
Deividas Sirvydis was an EuroCup Basketball Top Scorer while playing for BC Lietkabelis in the 2023–2024 season

Kullamae, Murauskas, Rubštavičius, Golomon, Šakić, Duffy and Morris all departed Lietkabelis during the summer. To replace coach Čanak, Lietkabelis signed former Rytas long-time player, Latvian Roberts Štelmahers as the new head coach for the team. Orelik remained with the team, along with Lipkevičius, Maldūnas, Popovič and Nikas Stuknys. Lietkabelis started work and signed Dovis Bičkauskis from CBet, Jon Davis from Juventus, both of whom caused massive problems for Lietkabelis during the LKL playoffs, loaned Liutauras Lelevičius from Žalgiris, signed Alen Hadzibegovic as the new center, and finished with signing Martynas Varnas, fresh off a big season with BC Šiauliai and a bidding war with Rytas, the returning Paulius Valinskas, Džiugas Slavinskas, and then had the biggest signing of the summer, signing Deividas Sirvydis, fresh of his stint in both the NBA and the NBA G-League, along with a great showing in the 2023 Basketball World Cup with the Lithuanian national team, where he played alongside Maldūnas. Problems arose as early as the pre-season, when Davies was released from Lietkabelis just after a few games, and point guard Bičkauskis getting injured. Lietkabelis signed Donatas Sabeckis to fill in for the injured Bičkauskis. At the start of the LKL season, Lietkabelis was immediately shocked, as BC Neptūnas beat them in the opener. Lietkabelis struggled under Štelmahers. After a 1–3 start in the Eurocup, in a group featuring JL Bourg Basket, U-BT Cluj-Napoca, defending EuroCup champions Dreamland Gran Canaria, ratiopharm Ulm, Aris Midea, Türk Telekom, Budućnost VOLI, Dolomiti Energia Trento and Śląsk Wrocław, Lietkabelis decided to fire Štelmahers and replace him with the returning Čanak, who returned after an unsuccessful start of the season with Türk Telekom. Under Čanak, Lietkabelis went on to win 3 of the next four games, including an emotional home win for Čanak over his former team Türk Telekom, and Lietkabelis had finished the first half of the season in playoff contention and with a 4–5 record. Also under coach Čanak, Sirvydis went on to become the top scorer of the EuroCup competition, with Orelik also putting up huge scoring performances and Varnas also contributing big in games. The lack of center, however, hurt Lietkabelis, as Hadzibegovic suffered an early season ending injury and his brief replacement in Stefan Birčević did not make much of a contribution for Lietkabelis before being released in April. More injuries continued to haunt the team as Valinskas was also out, along with Orelik, Sirvydis and Lipkevičius in some key games, which resulted in Lietkabelis slumping the second half of the EuroCup season, finishing with just a 3–6 record, in particular painful losses to Trento and Türk Telekom, an 7–11 overall and out of the playoffs completely, with just a 7th-place finish in the group. Sirvydis remained as the top scorer for the competition, and made the All-EuroCup second team at the end of the season. With focus shifting back to the domestic front, Lietkabelis also made some adjustments to the roster - Sabeckis departed the team, and Bičkauskis returned to the team while Lietkabelis also signed Diante Baldwin as the new point guard, and also solved their problems with the center position by signing back Đorđe Gagić, recently released by the BC Wolves. In the King Mindaugas Cup, Lietkabelis faced and defeated tough competition from Neptūnas, losing in Klaipėda 89–91, but winning in Panevėžys, 79–76, to win on aggregate and advance to the semifinals. The semifinals, held in Kaunas, Lietkabelis faced off BC Rytas - supported by fans, and with a monster performance from Gagić, Lietkabelis erased a double digit deficit and went on to shock Rytas 94–86 in the semifinals, with Bičkauskis, Sirvydis and Orelik also contributing big in the win. In the finals, though, Lietkabelis once again faced BC Žalgiris - Žalgiris, having a huge homecourt advantage with almost 13000 fans in the Žalgirio Arena, dominated Lietkabelis and won the game 86–70 - with Lietkabelis winning their third silver medal in the last four seasons in the tournament. In the LKL, Lietkabelis struggled and finished with just a 16–14 record, and just in fifth place, without any home-court advantage for the first time since 2016. Valinskas also departed the team just before the playoffs. In the LKL playoffs, Lietkabelis faced off BC Juventus, who had beaten Lietkabelis in the season series to earn fourth place - in Utena, Lietkabelis took back the home-court advantage with an 84–77 win. Juventus responded with a controversial 89–88 win in Panevėžys to even the series at 1–1, and to set up the deciding game in Utena. Lietkabelis led for most of the game, before Juventus came back and forced overtime - in overtime, a tip-in by Maldūnas in the closing seconds and a turnover by Juventus resulted in Lietkabelis holding on to a 100–99 win over Juventus, winning the series 2–1. In the semifinals, Lietkabelis went on to face Žalgiris - Žalgiris beat Lietkabelis in a victorious 3–0 sweep by winning 93–72 in Kaunas, a controversial 90–89 win in the deciding seconds in Panevėžys and an 88–79 win in Kaunas - in a game most remembered for the season-ending injury for Žalgiris leader Keenan Evans and the late game ejection by coach Čanak. In the bronze medal series, Lietkabelis faced off the Wolves - with home-court advantage, as well as coming off a big series against Rytas, where Wolves took Rytas all the way to the limit, the Wolves were considered as favorites to win the bronze medals. Lietkabelis defied all odds by beating the Wolves 86–84 in the opening game in Vilnius to take a 1–0 series lead, erasing a double digit deficit in the deciding minutes. In Panevėžys, Lietkabelis once again erased a giant deficit, but it was the Wolves who prevailed in the end with an 81–73 win to tie the series at 1–1. The series, however, was decided by Lietkabelis - led by Sirvydis, Orelik and Gagić, who played his previous team after a largely poor tenure, Lietkabelis beat the Wolves in Vilnius, 91–84, and finished off the series with a 98–87 win to win the series 3–1, and surprising many by winning the bronze medals.

Coach Čanak remained with Lietkabelis, signing a new long-term contract. Lietkabelis changed up the roster, with Sirvydis, Orelik and Gagić being the most significant departures. Lietkabelis was led by new signing point guard Oleksandr Kovliar, the returning Mantas Rubštavičius and Martynas Varnas, who remained with Lietkabelis during the summer. Lietkabelis signed power forwards Danielius Lavrinovičius, fresh of a stint with Žalgiris, and Marko Pecarski, center Justin Briggs, guard Georgios Kalaitzakis, whose brother Panagiotis played for the LKL finalist Lietkabelis in 2022, and finished off the signings with Grantas Vasiliauskas returning with Lietkabelis. Lipkevičius, Bičkauskis, Maldūnas all remained with Lietkabelis. In the EuroCup, Lietkabelis started with a 0-4 record (losses to Türk Telekom, Hapoel Jerusalem B.C., Aris and Cedevita Olimpija), before winning against previous season finalists JL Bourg Basket and Hamburg Towers, followed by losses to U-BT Cluj-Napoca and Umana Reyer Venezia. Lietkabelis did finish off the first round with perhaps the biggest win in club history - an away win against long-time Euroleague participants and favorites of the competition Valencia Basket, becoming the first team of the EuroCup to win against Valencia during the season - finishing the first round with a 3-6 record. Lietkabelis also had significant changes - Briggs played sparringly due to injuries and was replaced, at first, by Andrija Stipanović on a short-term deal, and later by the returning Gagić full-time. Long-time club managed Mindaugas Purlys departed Lietkabelis to join the London Lions, a new project by the Žalgiris group, and was replaced by Jonas Mačiulis, former long-time player in both the Euroleague and the Lithuanian national team, and who was sporting director with BC Nevėžis. In the second round of the Eurocup, Lietkabelis finished with just a 2-7 record - with wins over, largely surprisingly, Hapoel and Cluj, Orelik's new team, and another close game (this time, a home loss) with Valencia. Lietkabelis was out of contention for the EuroCup playoffs early in January, and a 5-13 record was only good for 9th place, second to last, in the group. Lietkabelis made more changes during the season, with Pecarski departing Lietkabelis and replacing him with Paulius Danusevičius. In the King Mindaugas Cup, Lietkabelis defeated Nevėžis in the quarterfinals, before losing to BC Žalgiris in the semifinals. Lietkabelis won the bronze medals with a 100-91 win over Wolves-Twinsbet, fellow EuroCup participant. In the LKL, Lietkabelis finished the regular season with a 20-16 record, finishing third and having home-court advantage for the first round in the playoffs. Before the end of the season, Lipkevičius and Lavrinovičius suffered season ending injuries and Kalaitzkis was released due to off-court issues. Lietkabelis defeated BC Juventus 2-0 in the first round of the playoffs, with a 83-77 win at home and a 93-90 win in Utena. In the semifinals, Lietkabelis faced off Rytas - during the first game, one of the team leaders, Varnas also went down with an injury, leaving Lietkabelis with only an eight player rotation - Rytas won the first game 86-82 in Vilnius to take a 1-0 series lead. In Panevėžys, the short-handed Lietkabelis got revenge with a 73-70 win to tie the series at 1-1. The two teams split the next two games - Rytas winning 87-86 in a very close game in Vilnius, and Lietkabelis winning 87-76 in Panevėžys, to tie up at 2-2 and set up a deciding clash in Vilnius. This time Rytas took no chances and Lietkabelis was pounded from the very first minutes - a 94-70 win, and 3-2 series win advanced Rytas to the LKL finals while Lietkabelis went on to the bronze medal series against CBet Jonava - in a rematch of 2023, CBet beat Lietkabelis 90-83 in Panevėžys to open the series, before Lietkabelis, led by Kovliar, Rubštavičius, Gagić, Danusevičius and former CBet player Bičkauskis, won the next three games by defeating CBet 104-85 in Jonava, 92-78 in Panevėžys and 81-73 in Jonava, to win the series 3-1 and their third consecutive, and fifth bronze medal since 2020. Coach Čanak immediately announced that he will remain with Lietkabelis during the post-game interview.

The 2025-26 season was one of the weakest years for Lietkabelis since Čanak's arrival. A lack of imagination with the roster (with previous Lietkabelis stars like Jamel Morris, Kristian Kullamäe and Nikola Radičević returning), multiple injuries - in particular Nojus Radžius and Danielius Lavrinovičius - and players that made minimal impact like Lazar Mutić and Warren Washington - only Augustine Rubit, Michael Flowers and Fardaws Aimaq had some impact among the new players during their brief stints - resulted in another largely listless campaign in the EuroCup - fighting against Beşiktaş Gain (85:79 at home and 85:94 away), Cosea JL Bourg (65:93 away and 73:86 at home), Budućnost VOLI (91:98 at home and 81:95 away), Türk Telekom (74:100 at home and 75:85 away), Dolomiti Energia Trento (74:78 away and 93:94 at home), Niners Chemnitz (67:86 away and 79:85 at home), Ratiopharm Ulm (94:98 at home and 89:79 away), London Lions (61:74 at home and 66:58 away) and Panionios Athens (79:72 away and 89:62 at home) - Lietkabelis finished with a 5-13 record, was out of playoff contention by November. Danusevičius had his best year with Lietkabelis, as did Justas Furmanavičius, late season addition Lietkabelis won the bronze medals in the King Mindaugas Cup competition. In the LKL, Lietkabelis had moments - Lietkabelis managed to become the only team to beat BC Žalgiris in the regular season, and won the season series against BC Rytas, the winners of the FIBA Basketball Champions League. Despite this, Lietkablis struggled all year and managed only a 15-17 record and 5th place in the standings - the worst regular season finish since 2016. In the playoffs, Lietkabelis did upset the favorites, BC Šiauliai, 2:0 (85:84 away and 93:77 at home), in the quarterfinals - reaching the semifinals once again. Žalgiris beat Lietkabelis 3:0 (85:75 away, 95:75 at home, 103:93 away) in the semifinals. In the bronze medal series, Lietkabelis faced off BC Neptūnas - with Neptūnas prevailing 3:1 (73:86 away, 80:68 at home, 63:66 away, 82:91 at home) to win the bronze medals. Lietkabelis finished without any medals in the LKL for the first time since 2019.

== Players ==
=== Current roster ===
Note: Flags indicate national team eligibility at FIBA-sanctioned events. Players may hold other non-FIBA nationalities not displayed.

BC Lietkabelis roster
Players
Coaches

Pos.	No.	Nat.	Name	Ht.	Wt.	Age
G/F	0	(United States)	Kennedy, Keondre	1.96 m (6 ft 5 in)	84 kg (185 lb)	26 – 17 January 2000
G	2	(Switzerland)	Schumacher, Alex	1.91 m (6 ft 3 in)	84 kg (185 lb)	25 – 20 February 2001
G/F	3	(Lithuania)	Šimonis, Žygimantas	1.94 m (6 ft 4 in)	92 kg (203 lb)	31 – 8 February 1995
G	5	(Lithuania)	Radžius, Nojus	1.84 m (6 ft 0 in)	80 kg (176 lb)	21 – 28 June 2005
F/C	8	(Serbia)	Ilić, Veljko (injured)	2.08 m (6 ft 10 in)	109 kg (240 lb)	24 – 8 April 2002
F	9	(Lithuania)	Baslyk, Daniel	2.00 m (6 ft 7 in)	97 kg (214 lb)	25 – 24 February 2001
G	10	(Serbia)	Jaramaz, Ognjen	1.93 m (6 ft 4 in)	88 kg (194 lb)	31 – 1 September 1995
C	11	(Serbia)	Ilić, Miloš	2.10 m (6 ft 11 in)	107 kg (236 lb)	24 – 8 April 2002
C	12	(Lithuania)	Maldūnas, Gabrielius (C)	2.04 m (6 ft 8 in)	100 kg (220 lb)	33 – 19 April 1993
F	23	(France)	Fevrier, Ivan (injured)	2.04 m (6 ft 8 in)	98 kg (216 lb)	27 – 8 February 1999
F	50	(Lithuania)	Nemeikša, Gytis	2.02 m (6 ft 8 in)	100 kg (220 lb)	25 – 17 October 2001
G	99	(Lithuania)	Valinskas, Marius	1.87 m (6 ft 2 in)	75 kg (165 lb)	27 – 4 May 1999
F/C		(France)	Sy, Bandja	2.05 m (6 ft 9 in)	100 kg (220 lb)	36 – 30 July 1990

Head coach

- (Serbia) Nenad Čanak

Assistant coach(es)

- (Lithuania) Tautvydas Šležas
- (Lithuania) Simas Juraitis

Athletic trainer(s)

- (Lithuania) Darius Aučyna

Physiotherapist(s)

- (Lithuania) Eglė Laurinavičiūtė

Legend

- (C) Team captain
- Injured

- Roster
Updated: 2 November 2026

=== Depth chart ===
Pos.	Starting 5	Bench 1	Bench 2	Inactive
C	Gabrielius Maldūnas	Miloš Ilić		Veljko Ilić (injured)
PF	Bandja Sy	Gytis Nemeikša		Ivan Fevrier (injured)
SF	Keondre Kennedy	Daniel Baslyk
SG	Ognjen Jaramaz	Marius Valinskas	Žygimantas Šimonis
PG	Alex Schumacher	Nojus Radžius

=== In ===
No.	Pos.	Nat.	Name	Moving from		Ends
0	G/F	(United States)	Keondre Kennedy	Kolossos Rodou	(Greece)	
2	G	(Switzerland)	Alex Schumacher	Long Island Nets	(United States)	
3	G/F	(Lithuania)	Žygimantas Šimonis	Sūduva	(Lithuania)	
8	F/C	(Serbia)	Veljko Ilić	Sam Houston Bearkats	(United States)	
9	F	(Lithuania)	Daniel Baslyk	Šiauliai	(Lithuania)	
10	G	(Serbia)	Ognjen Jaramaz	Cedevita Olimpija	(Slovenia)	
11	C	(Serbia)	Miloš Ilić	California Golden Bears	(United States)	
23	F	(France)	Ivan Fevrier	Pallacanestro Cantù	(Italy)	
99	G	(Lithuania)	Marius Valinskas	Šiauliai	(Lithuania)	
	F/C	(France)	Bandja Sy	Partizan	(Serbia)	

=== Out ===
No.	Pos.	Nat.	Name	Moving to	
1	SG	(United States)	Jamel Morris	Fortitudo Bologna	(Italy)
2	G	(Lithuania)	Dovis Bičkauskis	Free agent	
4	F	(Lithuania)	Justas Furmanavičius	Juventus Utena	(Lithuania)
6	F	(Bosnia and Herzegovina)	Lazar Mutić	Andorra	(Spain)
7	G	(Estonia)	Kristian Kullamäe	U-BT Cluj-Napoca	(Romania)
10	F	(Lithuania)	Vytenis Lipkevičius	KK Jurbarkas-Karys	(Lithuania)
22	C	(United States)	Warren Washington	Bursaspor Basketbol	(Turkey)
24	G/F	(Lithuania)	Nojus Kulieša	Jonava Hipocredit	(Lithuania)
35	F/C	(Lithuania)	Danielius Lavrinovičius	Nevėžis Kėdainiai	(Lithuania)
44	PG	(Serbia)	Nikola Radičević	Free agent	
77	PF	(Lithuania)	Paulius Danusevičius	Manisa Basket	(Turkey)

=== Loaned in ===
No.	Pos.	Nat.	Name	Moving from		Ends
50	F	(Lithuania)	Gytis Nemeikša	Rytas Vilnius	(Lithuania)	

== Honours ==
=== Domestic competitions ===
- Lithuanian SSR Championship

Winners (2): 1985, 1988

- Lithuanian Basketball League

Runners-up (2): 2017, 2022
3rd place (5): 2020, 2021, 2023, 2024, 2025

- King Mindaugas Cup

Runners-up (4): 2017, 2021, 2022, 2024
3rd place (6): 2018, 2019, 2020, 2023, 2025, 2026

=== Regional competitions ===
- BBL Challenge Cup

Winners (2): 2005, 2012
3rd place (2): 2010, 2011

- BBL Championship

3rd place (1): 2016

== Club achievements ==
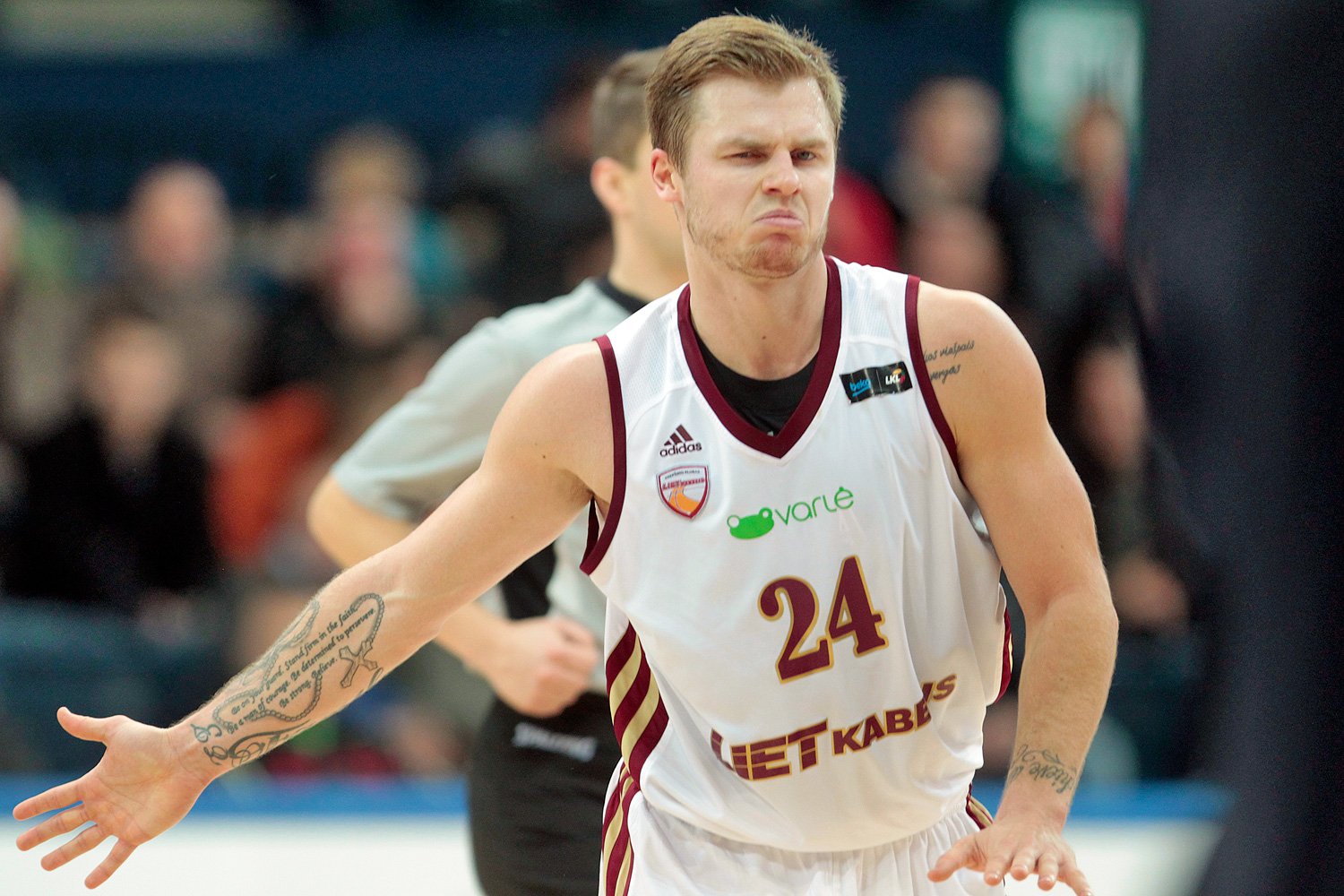
Evaldas Žabas was named LKL All-Star in 2015.

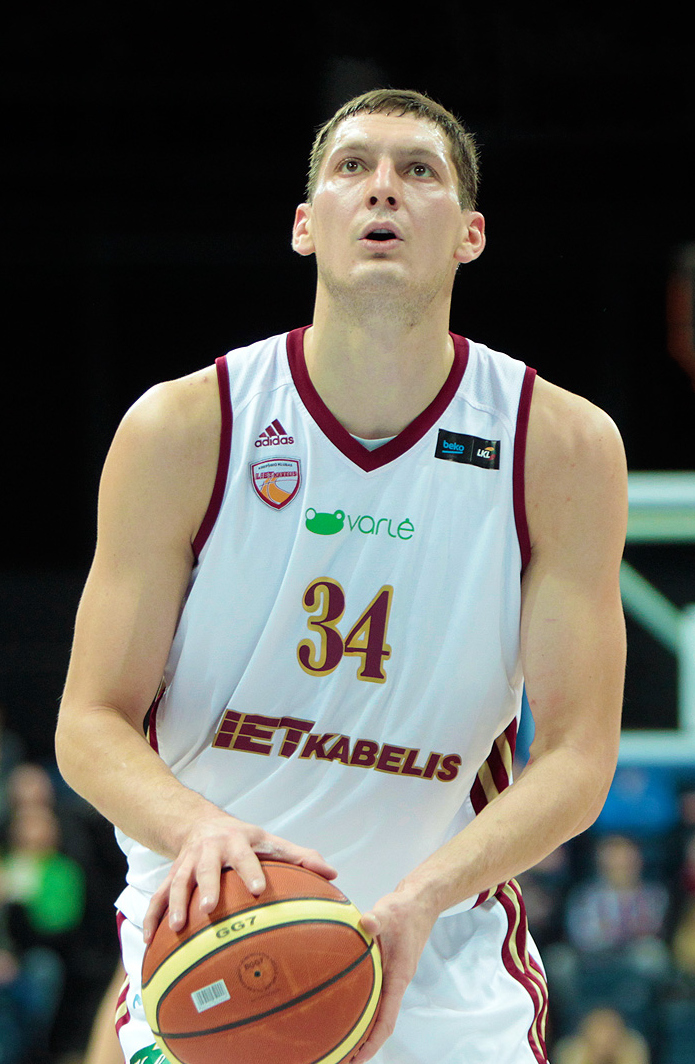
Egidijus Dimša was one of Lietkabelis' team leaders in 2015.

Season	League	Pos.	Baltic League	Pos.	Cup	European competitions	
1993–94	LKL	9th					
1994–95	LKL	9th					
1995–96	LKL	10th					
1996–97	LKL	9th					
1997–98	LKL	10th					
1998–99	LKL	6th					
1999–00	LKL	6th				3 Korać Cup	GS
2000–01	LKL	7th					
2001–02	LKL	9th					
2002–03	LKL	9th					
2003–04	LKL	7th					
2004–05	LKL	8th	Challenge Cup	1st			
2005–06	LKL	7th	Elite Division	11th			
2006–07	LKL	5th	Challenge Cup	11th			
2007–08	LKL	9th	Challenge Cup	4th			
2008–09	LKL	9th	Challenge Cup	7th	Eighth-finalist		
2009–10	LKL	6th	Challenge Cup	3rd			
2010–11	LKL	6th	Challenge Cup	3rd	Second round		
2011–12	LKL	11th	Challenge Cup	1st	Withdrew		
2012–13	LKL	9th	Top 16		Quarterfinalist		
2013–14	LKL	9th	Top 16		Fourth round		
2014–15	LKL	8th	Quarterfinalist		Quarterfinalist		
2015–16	LKL	7th	Third place		Quarterfinalist		
2016–17	LKL	2nd			Runner-up	2 EuroCup	T16
2017–18	LKL	4th			Third place	2 EuroCup	RS
2018–19	LKL	4th			Third place	3 Basketball Champions League	RS
2019–20	LKL	3rd			Third place	3 Basketball Champions League	EF
2020–21	LKL	3rd			Runner-up	2 EuroCup	RS
2021–22	LKL	2nd			Runner-up	2 EuroCup	EF
2022–23	LKL	3rd			Third place	2 EuroCup	EF
2023–24	LKL	3rd			Runner-up	2 EuroCup	RS
2024–25	LKL	3rd			Third place	2 EuroCup	RS
2025–26	LKL	4th			Third place	2 EuroCup	RS

Detailed information of former rosters and results.

== Notable players ==
- Lithuanians:
- (Lithuania) Rimas Kurtinaitis 1979–1980
- (Lithuania) Algimantas Pavilonis
- (Lithuania) Raimundas Čivilis
- (Lithuania) Gintaras Leonavičius Sr. 1984–1992, 1994–1996
- (Lithuania) Egidijus Karalevičius 1993–1994
- (Lithuania) Žydrūnas Urbonas 1993–1994, 1995–1998, 2007–2008
- (Lithuania) Paulius Staškūnas 1993–1998, 2001–2002, 2003–2004, 2005–2009
- (Lithuania) Dainius Pleta 1994–1997
- (Lithuania) Gintaras Bačianskas 1994–1995, 1996–1997
- (Lithuania) Andrius Vyšniauskas 1996–1998
- (Lithuania) Gediminas Ramonas 1996–1999
- (Lithuania) Gintaras Kadžiulis 1996–1999
- (Lithuania) Gintaras Stulga 1998–1999, 2000–2001
- (Lithuania) Mindaugas Lukauskis 1996–2001, 2016–2017
- (Lithuania) Saulius Raziulis 1993–1994, 1998–2001
- (Lithuania) Nerijus Varnelis 1997–1998, 2006–2007
- (Lithuania) Gintaras Leonavičius Jr. 2002–2004, 2010–2011, 2016–2018
- (Lithuania) Marius Janišius 2002–2004, 2008–2009
- (Lithuania) Tomas Gaidamavičius 2004–2007
- (Lithuania) Valdas Vasylius 2008–2009, 2010–2011, 2013–2015
- (Lithuania) Gytis Sirutavičius 2004–2005, 2009–2010, 2012–2013
- (Lithuania) Egidijus Dimša 2010–2011, 2014–2015
- (Lithuania) Vaidas Čepukaitis 2011–2012
- (Lithuania) Edgaras Ulanovas 2012–2013
- (Lithuania) Vytenis Čižauskas 2014
- (Lithuania) Dainius Šalenga 2014–2015
- (Lithuania) Žygimantas Janavičius 2014, 2016–2017
- (Lithuania) Evaldas Žabas 2014–2015
- (Lithuania) Darjuš Lavrinovič 2016–2018
- (Lithuania) Kšyštof Lavrinovič 2016–2018
- (Lithuania) Žygimantas Skučas 2016–2018
- (Lithuania) Adas Juškevičius 2017–2018
- (Lithuania) Simas Jasaitis 2017–2019
- (Lithuania) Paulius Valinskas 2018–2019, 2019–2021, 2023–2024
- (Lithuania) Vytenis Lipkevičius 2018–
- (Lithuania) Gabrielius Maldūnas 2019–
- (Lithuania) Tomas Dimša 2019–2020
- (Lithuania) Margiris Normantas 2019–2021
- (Lithuania) Gytis Masiulis 2020–2021
- (Lithuania) Kristupas Žemaitis 2021-22
- (Lithuania) Dovydas Giedraitis 2021-22
- (Lithuania) Gediminas Orelik 2021-22, 2023-24
- (Lithuania) Mantas Rubštavičius 2022-23
- (Lithuania) Paulius Murauskas 2022-23
- (Lithuania) Deividas Sirvydis 2023-24

- Foreigners:
- (United States) Christopher Hill 2007–2009
- (United States) Robert Griffin 2007–2008
- (United States) Demarius Bolds 2008–2009
- (Croatia) Goran Vrbanc 2013–2014
- (Croatia) Jurica Žuža 2014–2015
- (United States) Brandon Wood 2015
- (United States) Lorenzo Williams 2016–2018
- (Australia) Ben Madgen 2016–2017
- (Latvia) Žanis Peiners 2017–2018
- (Finland) Jamar Wilson 2018–2019
- (Croatia) Željko Šakić 2019–2020, 2022–2023
- (Serbia) Đorđe Gagić 2020–2022, 2024, 2024-2025
- (Greece) Panagiotis Kalaitzakis 2021–2022
- (Serbia) Nikola Radičević 2021–2022
- (United States) Kyle Vinales 2020–2021
- (Latvia) Kaspars Berzins 2021–2022
- (United States) Jamel Morris 2022–2023
- (Estonia) Kristian Kullamäe 2022–2023
- (Serbia) Stefan Peno 2022–2023
- (Hungary) György Golomán 2022–2023
- (Serbia) Nikola Popović 2023–2024
- (Serbia) Stefan Birčević 2023–2024

== Head coaches ==
- (Lithuania) Raimundas Sargūnas: 1972–1978, 1991–1994
- (Lithuania) Vidmantas Paškauskas: 1979–1996
- (Lithuania) Gintaras Leonavičius: 1997–2004, 2009–2011, 2012
- (Lithuania) Audrius Prakuraitis: 2004–2005
- (Lithuania) Paulius Juodis: 2005–2006
- (Lithuania) Ramūnas Cvirka: 2006–2007
- (Lithuania) Aurimas Matulevičius: 2007–2009
- (Lithuania) Algirdas Milonas: 2011–2012
- (Lithuania) Žydrūnas Valuckis: 2012–2013
- (Lithuania) Robertas Giedraitis: 2013
- (Lithuania) Gintautas Vileita: 2013
- (Lithuania) Algirdas Brazys: 2013–2014
- (Lithuania) Mindaugas Budzinauskas: 2014
- (Lithuania) Gintaras Kadžiulis: 2014–2015, 2018
- (Lithuania) Kazys Maksvytis: 2015–2017
- (Latvia) Artūrs Štālbergs: 2017
- (Lithuania) Ramūnas Butautas: 2017–2018
- (Serbia) Nenad Čanak: 2018–2023, 2023–present
- (Latvia) Roberts Štelmahers: 2023
