= Courtney Fells =

American basketball player (born 1986)

Personal information
- Born: September 20, 1986 (age 40) Tupelo, Mississippi, U.S.
- Listed height: 6 ft 7 in (2.01 m)
- Listed weight: 205 lb (93 kg)

Career information
- High school: Shannon (Shannon, Mississippi)
- College: NC State (2005–2009)
- NBA draft: 2009: undrafted
- Playing career: 2009–2023
- Position: Small forward

Career history
- 2009–2010: AEL Limassol
- 2010–2011: Keravnos
- 2011–2012: Hapoel Gilboa Galil
- 2011–2013: Metros de Santiago
- 2012–2013: Hapoel Jerusalem
- 2013: Talk 'N Text Tropang Texters
- 2013–2014: Austin Toros
- 2014: Bucaneros de La Guaira
- 2014–2015: Uşak Sportif
- 2015: San Lorenzo de Almagro
- 2015–2016: Virtus Bologna
- 2016: Trabzonspor
- 2016: Texas Legends
- 2016–2017: Westchester Knicks
- 2017: Atléticos de San Germán
- 2017–2018: Hapoel Galil Elyon
- 2017–2018: Quimsa
- 2018–2020: Hoops Club
- 2020–2021: Prizreni-16
- 2021–2022: Peja
- 2022–2023: KK Kvarner 2010

Career highlights
- Liga Unike champion (2022); Kosovo Supercup winner (2021)
- Stats at Basketball Reference

Courtney Fells (born September 20, 1986) is an American former professional basketball player. He has previously played for Hoops Club in Lebanon and Club Atlético Aguada in Uruguay. He attended and played college basketball for NC State university.

== College career ==
Fells played college basketball at North Carolina State University.

== Professional career ==
After going undrafted in the 2009 NBA draft, Fells joined the Orlando Magic for the 2009 NBA Summer League. He later signed with AEL Limassol of Cyprus for the 2009–10 season.

In 2010, he signed with Keravnos of Cyprus for the 2010–11 season.

In January 2011, he left Cyprus and signed with Hapoel Gilboa Galil of the Israeli Basketball Super League on a multi-year deal.

Following the conclusion of the 2010–11 season, he joined Metros de Santiago for the 2011 LNB season. He then re-joined Hapoel Gilboa Galil for the 2011–12 season. Following the conclusion of that season, he re-joined Metros de Santiago for the 2012 LNB season.

In August 2012, he signed with Hapoel Jerusalem of Israel for the 2012–13 season. In December 2012, he was named Eurocup MVP for Round 5.

Following the conclusion of the 2012–13 season, he again re-joined Metros de Santiago for the 2013 LNB season. In September 2013, he signed with Talk 'N Text Tropang Texters as an import for the 2013 Governor's Cup. He left after 3 games.

On September 30, 2013, he signed with the San Antonio Spurs. However, he was later waived by Spurs on October 20, 2013. On October 31, 2013, Fells was acquired by the Austin Toros of the NBA Development League as an affiliate player. In April 2014, he signed with Bucaneros de La Guaira of Venezuela.

On July 25, 2014, he signed with Uşak Sportif of Turkey for the 2014–15 season.

On June 28, 2015, it was announced that Fells would play for the New Orleans Pelicans in the 2015 NBA Las Vegas Summer League. On August 19, 2015, he signed with San Lorenzo de Almagro of the Argentine Liga Nacional de Básquet. On November 18, 2015, he left San Lorenzo and signed with Virtus Bologna of Italy for the rest of the season. On February 16, 2016, he parted ways with Virtus after appearing in eleven games. On February 23, 2016, he signed with Trabzonspor of the Turkish Basketball Super League. On April 30, 2016, he parted ways with Trabzonspor.

On October 30, 2016, Fells was acquired by the Texas Legends. In 10 games for the Legends, he averaged 7.7 points, 2.9 rebounds, 2.3 steals and 1.7 assists in 27.8 minutes. On December 21, he was acquired by the Westchester Knicks in a three-team trade. On March 26, 2017, Fells was waived by the Knicks. On April 2, 2017, he signed with the Atléticos de San Germán of the Puerto Rican Baloncesto Superior Nacional.

On October 5, 2017, Fells signed with Israeli club Hapoel Galil Elyon of the Liga Leumit.

In May 2018, Fells signed with Rafael Barias of the Dominican Torneo de Baloncesto Superior (TBS), making his debut on May 1 in a 76–74 win against San Carlos. In July he signed with the Dominican club Soles de Santo Domingo Este.

On March 3, 2022, Fells signed with KB Peja of the Kosovo Basketball Superleague.
