= Kazys Maksvytis =

Lithuanian professional basketball coach

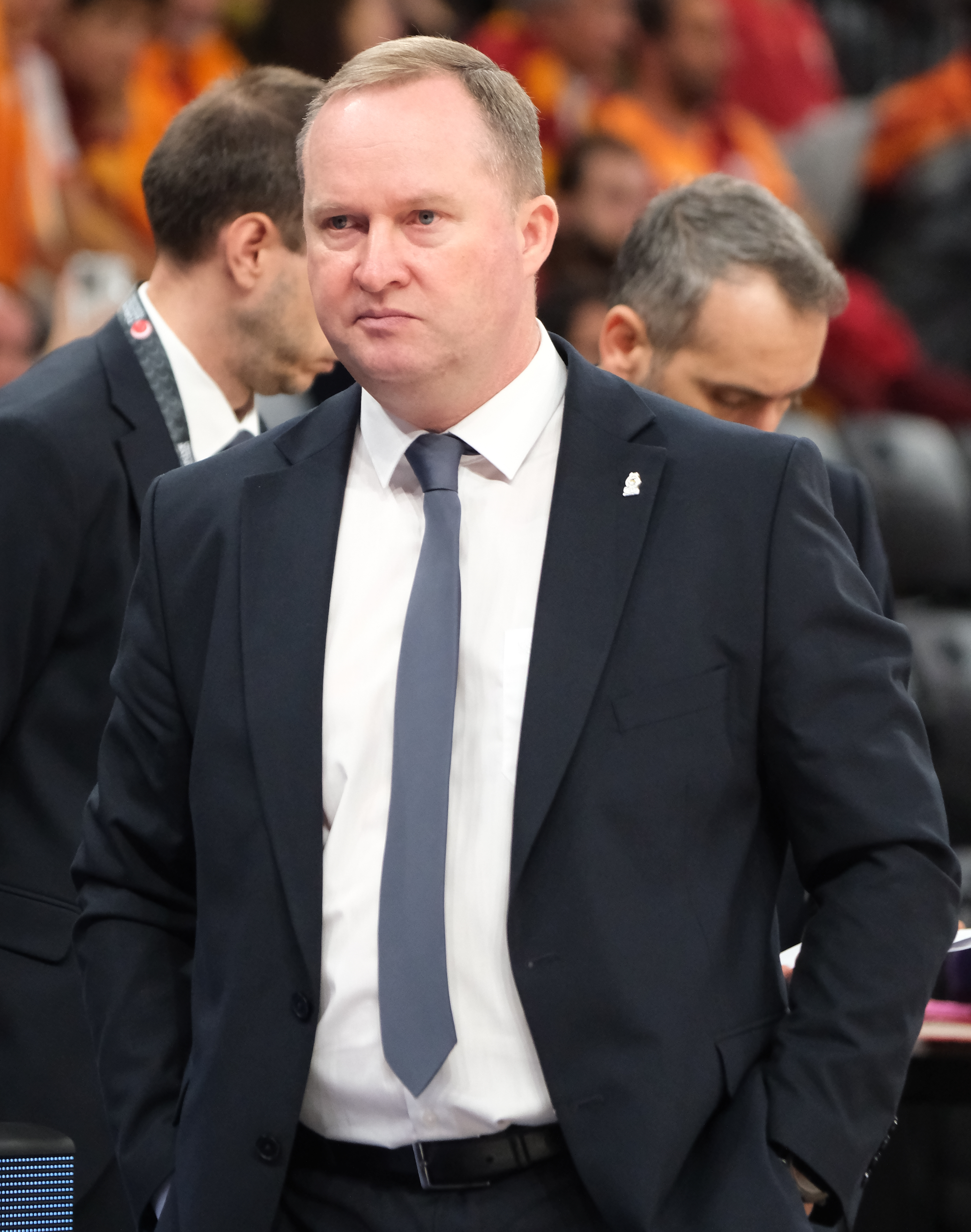
- Maksvytis as assistant coach of Fenerbahçe in 2025

Fenerbahçe Tarfin
- Position: Assistant coach
- League: BSL

Personal information
- Born: 15 June 1977 (age 49) Darbėnai, Lithuania
- Coaching career: 2011–present

Career history

Coaching
- 2010–2011: Aisčiai Kaunas
- 2011–2012: Sakalai Vilnius
- 2012–2015: Neptūnas Klaipėda
- 2015–2017: Lietkabelis Panevėžys
- 2017–2019: Neptūnas Klaipėda
- 2019–2022: Parma Perm
- 2021–2024: Lithuania
- 2022–2023: Žalgiris Kaunas
- 2024–2025: Manisa Basket
- 2025–present: Fenerbahçe (assistant)

Career highlights
- As head coach: Lithuanian League champion (2023); Lithuanian King Mindaugas Cup winner (2023); Lithuanian League Coach of the Year (2014); As Assistant Coach: Turkish Super League champion (2026); Turkish Cup winner (2026); 2× Turkish Super Cup winner (2025, 2026)
Medals
Men's basketball
Head coach for Lithuania
FIBA Europe Under-16 Championship
Gold medal – first place	2008 Italy	National Team
FIBA Europe Under-18 Championship
Gold medal – first place	2010 Lithuania	National Team
FIBA World Under-19 Championship
Gold medal – first place	2011 Latvia	National Team
FIBA Europe Under-20 Championship
Gold medal – first place	2012 Slovenia	National Team

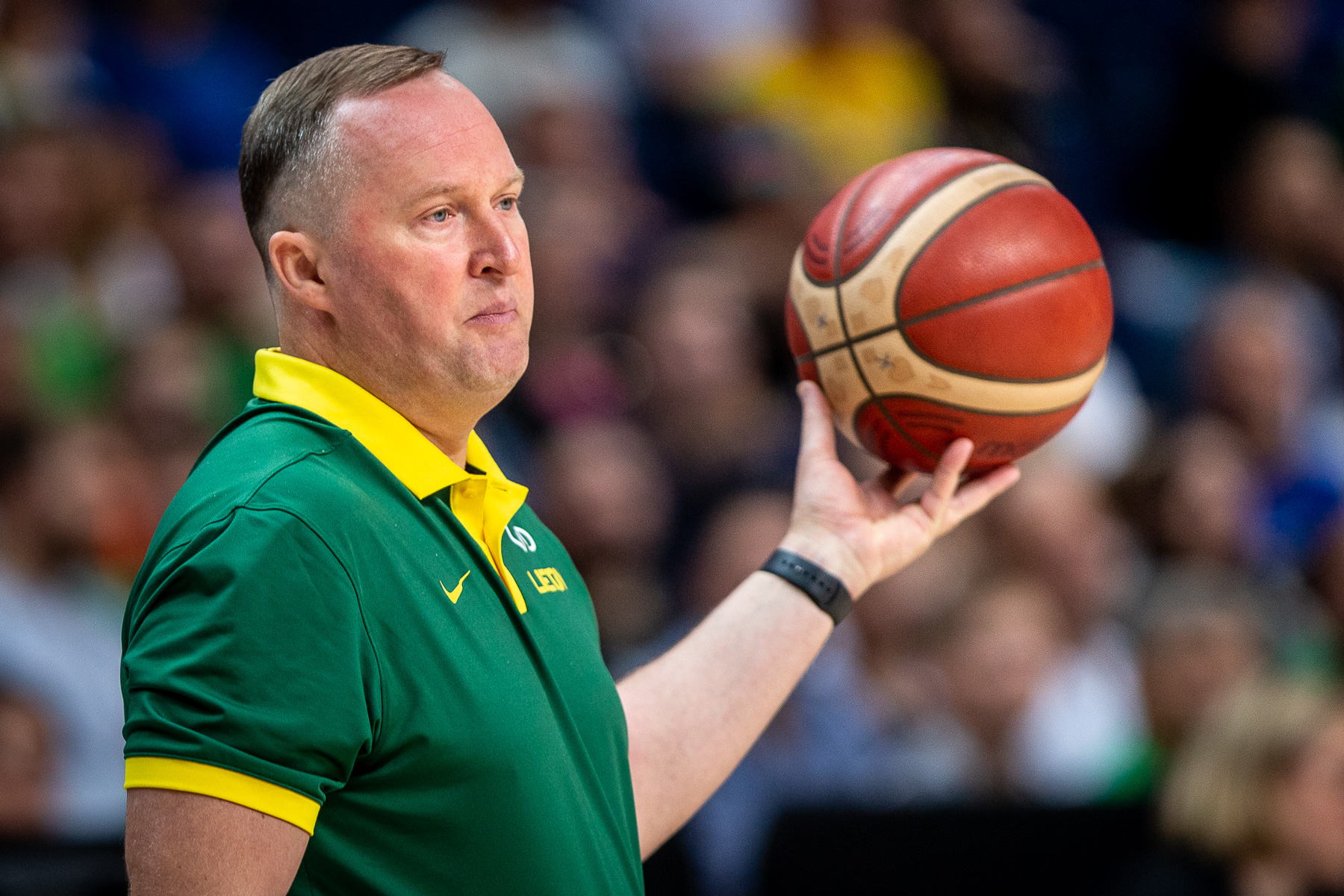
Maksvytis as head coach of Lithuania in 2022

Kazys Maksvytis (born 15 June 1977) is a Lithuanian professional basketball coach who currently serves as an assistant coach of Fenerbahçe of Basketbol Süper Ligi (BSL) and the EuroLeague.

== Coaching career ==
=== Professional clubs ===
From 2011 to 2012, Maksvytis was the head coach of the Lithuanian club Sakalai Vilnius.

On 2012 he became the head coach of Neptūnas Klaipėda. In 2012–13 season he guided the team to Lithuanian Basketball League third place. In 2013–14 season Maksvytis won the second place in the Lithuanian Basketball League and won the right to play in the EuroLeague next season.

In December 2015, Maksvytis was appointed as the head coach for Lietkabelis Panevėžys. In the following 2016–17 season, he helped the team to reach their first ever LKL finals, winning the silver medal after losing 4–1 to Žalgiris Kaunas. In June 2017, Maksvytis returned to Neptūnas Klaipėda, guiding them to a third-place finish and bronze medals in both 2017–18 and 2018–19.

In June 2019, Maksvytis signed as the new head coach for Russian club Parma Basket of the VTB United League. On February 27, he decided to leave Parma following the Russian invasion of Ukraine. Almost a month later, it was announced he would take over the Lithuanian champions Žalgiris Kaunas in the 2022–23 season. However, after the team lost two consecutive Lithuanian League games for the first time in seven years, Jure Zdovc was let go and Maksvytis actually started the job earlier - on 11 April 2022, when he signed a three-year (2+1) deal.

In its first full season under Maksvytis in 2022–23, Žalgiris won the Lithuanian League championship, as well as the Lithuanian cup. In the EuroLeague, the team finished the regular season in seventh place with a 19–15 record, qualifying for the play-offs for the first time since the 2018–19 season. Maksvytis placed third in the voting for the 2022–23 Alexander Gomelsky EuroLeague Coach of the Year.

In the 2023–24 season, Žalgiris started its EuroLeague campaign with three wins in four games (3–1). However, the team then went into a slump and finished the first half of the season with six consecutive losses, placed 16th in the standings with a 5–12 record. On 30 December 2023, it was announced that Maksvytis left Žalgiris by mutual consent.

On 12 November 2024 Maksvytis became the head coach of Manisa Basket of the Basketbol Süper Ligi (BSL). He signed a deal until the end of 2025-2026 season.

On 10 July 2025, Maksvytis signed with Fenerbahçe and became an assistant coach of Šarūnas Jasikevičius.

=== National teams ===
While the head coach of the youth men's teams, Maksvytis won the gold medal in the European 2008 U16, 2010 U18, 2011 U19 and the 2012 U20 championships. On 14 September 2021 Maksvytis was appointed the new head coach of Lithuanian National team. Under Maksvytis guidance the Lithuanian National team qualified to EuroBasket 2022 where the team lost to the Spanish National team in the Round of 16. In 2023 the team finished 6th in 2023 FIBA Basketball World Cup with a sensational win 110–104 against the United States men's national basketball team. In 2024, under Maksvytis, Lithuania failed to qualify for the Olympics for the second consecutive time after losing to Puerto Rico at the Olympic Qualifying Tournament in San Juan.

== Coaching record ==
Legend
G	Games coached	W	Games won	L	Games lost	W–L %	Win-loss %

Note: The EuroLeague is not the only competition in which the team played during the season. He also coached in domestic competition, and regional competition if applicable.

=== EuroLeague ===
Team	Year	G	W	L	W–L%	Result
Neptūnas	2014–15	10	4	6	.286	Eliminated in group stage
Žalgiris	2022–23	37	19	18	.514	Eliminated in quarterfinals
Žalgiris	2023–24	17	5	12	.294	Parted ways
Career		64	28	36	.489	

=== EuroCup ===
Team	Year	G	W	L	W–L%	Result
Neptūnas	2013–14	10	4	6	.286	Eliminated in regular season
Neptūnas	2014–15	6	1	5	.167	Eliminated in Last 32 stage
Lietkabelis	2016-17	14	5	9	.357	Eliminated in Top 16 stage
Career		30	10	20	.333	

=== Basketball Champions League ===
Team	Year	G	W	L	W–L%	Result
Neptūnas	2017–18	16	8	8	.500	Eliminated in the Round of 16
Neptūnas	2018–19	16	8	8	.500	Eliminated in the Round of 16
Manisa Basket	2024-25	10	4	6	.357	Eliminated in the Round of 16
Career		42	20	22	.476	

=== FIBA Europe Cup ===
Team	Year	G	W	L	W–L%	Result
Parma	2020–21	6	4	2	.667	Lost in Third Place game
Parma	2021–22	12	7	5	.583	Eliminated in Second Round
Career		18	11	7	.611	
