= Artūrs Štālbergs =

Latvian basketball player and coach

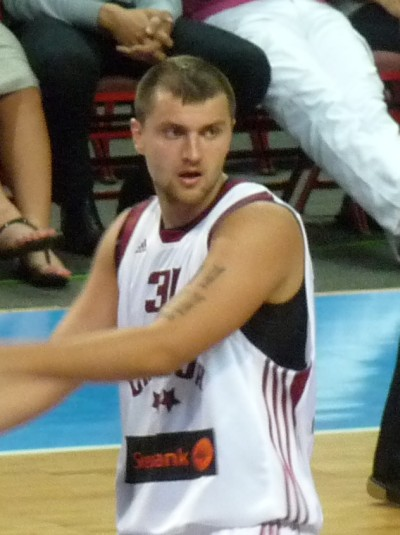
- Artūrs Štālbergs in 2009.

BK Liepājas Lauvas
- Title: Head coach
- League: LBL; Baltic League

Personal information
- Born: October 15, 1984 (age 42) Liepāja, Latvian SSR, Soviet Union
- Listed height: 6 ft 5 in (1.96 m)
- Listed weight: 220 lb (100 kg)

Career information
- College: Cowley College (2003–2005); Evansville (2005–2007)
- NBA draft: 2007: undrafted
- Playing career: 2007–2010
- Position: Power forward
- Coaching career: 2010–present

Career history

Playing
- 2007–2009: Liepājas Lauvas
- 2009–2010: VEF Rīga
- 2010: Liepājas Lauvas

Coaching
- 2010–2012: Liepājas Lauvas (assistant)
- 2012–2014: MBC Mykolaiv (assistant)
- 2013: Latvia U20
- 2013–present: Latvia (assistant)
- 2014: Valmiera (assistant)
- 2014–2016: Nizhny Novgorod (assistant)
- 2016–2017: Nizhny Novgorod
- 2017: Lietkabelis Panevėžys
- 2018–present: BK Liepājas Lauvas

Artūrs Štālbergs (born October 15, 1984) is a Latvian professional basketball coach for BK Liepājas Lauvas. He is also a former player.

== Playing career ==
Štālbergs started basketball career in his hometown Liepāja. In 2003, he moved to USA where he played college basketball. Štālbergs finished his collegiate career in 2007 at University of Evansville.

In 2007, he returned to Europe and joined Liepājas Lauvas where he played for two years. After a strong second season in Liepāja, he agreed with Ukrainian team BC Azovmash in August 2009. However, ultimately he didn't sign contract with them. In October 2009, he moved to VEF Rīga.

In September 2010, he decided to retire from basketball so he could pursue a coaching career.

He was a member of the Latvia national basketball team that participated in EuroBasket 2009.

== Coaching career ==
Štālbergs started coaching in 2010 when he joined Liepājas Lauvas coaching staff which was led by Agris Galvanovskis. In 2012, he followed Galvanovskis and moved to Ukrainian team MBC Mykolaiv to be his assistant. In early 2014, he left Ukraine due to unstable political situation and finished season at Valmiera's coaching staff.

In July 2014, he was added as an assistant coach to BC Nizhny Novgorod, which is set to make Euroleague debut for 2014-15 campaign. He was hired as head coach for Nizhny Novgorod for the 2016–2017 season, coaching the team to the Eurocup Top16 stage, but left in the summer due to poor results in the VTB League. He served as head coach for BC Lietkabelis for the 2017–2018 season. He started the season with an 8–0 record in the LKL, and was successful in the Eurocup, with a 3–2 record, before a couple of unexpected losses and reported clashes with management and players lead to his firing in December. He was hired as the new coach for BK Liepājas Lauvas for the 2018–2019 season in May.

Štālbergs has also been involved in Latvian National Team programs. He was the head coach of Latvian U20 National Team that made finals of U20 European Championship.
