= Marius Valinskas =

Lithuanian basketball player (born 1999)

No. 99 – Lietkabelis Panevėžys
- Position: Point guard
- League: LKL; EuroCup

Personal information
- Born: 4 May 1999 (age 27) Kaunas, Lithuania
- Listed height: 1.87 m (6 ft 2 in)
- Listed weight: 77 kg (170 lb)

Career information
- Playing career: 2015–present

Career history
- 2015–2016: Sabonis Basketball Center
- 2016–2019: Žalgiris Kaunas
- 2016-2019: →Žalgiris-2
- 2019: →Lietkabelis Panevėžys
- 2019–2021: Lietkabelis Panevėžys
- 2021–2023: Nevėžis Kėdainiai
- 2023–2024: Juventus Utena
- 2024–2026: Šiauliai
- 2026–present: Lietkabelis Panevėžys

Marius Valinskas (born 4 May 1999) is a Lithuanian professional basketball player for Lietkabelis Panevėžys of the Lithuanian Basketball League (LKL) and the EuroCup. Standing at 1.87 m (6 ft 1 1/2 in), he plays both guard positions.

== Early career ==
Prior to his professional career, Valinskas played for Kaunas-based Sabonis Basketball Center team, which played in the third-tier RKL. In 2016, he moved to BC Žalgiris-2 of the NKL, where he played for three seasons.

== Professional career ==
On 30 April 2019, Valinskas was loaned to Lietkabelis Panevėžys of the Lithuanian Basketball League (LKL) until the end of the 2018–2019 season. On 21 June 2019, he signed a long-term contract with Lietkabelis. On 23 July 2021, he was released by the club.

On 6 August 2022, Valinskas signed a two-year contract with Nevėžis Kėdainiai of the Lithuanian Basketball League (LKL). On 21 June 2023, Valinskas signed a one-year deal with Juventus Utena.

On 19 July 2024, Valinskas signed a two-year (1+1) contract with Šiauliai of the Lithuanian Basketball League (LKL).

On 20 July 2026, Valinskas signed one–year contract with Lietkabelis Panevėžys of the Lithuanian Basketball League (LKL) and the EuroCup.

== Personal life ==
Valinskas' older brother, Paulius, is also a professional basketball player who has previously played for Žalgiris Kaunas, as well as internationally in Belgium and Serbia.
