= Algimantas Pavilonis =

Lithuanian basketball player (born 1953)

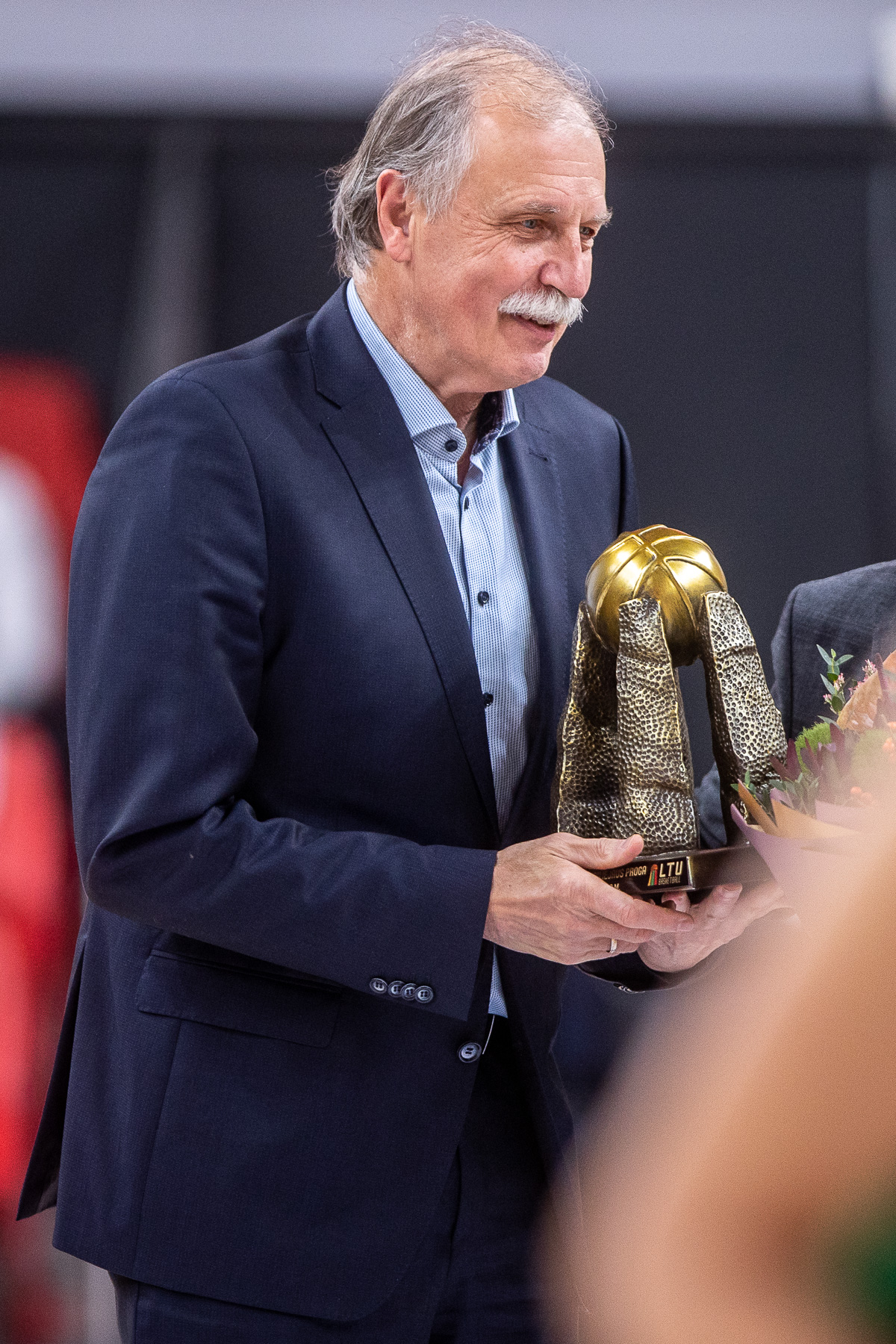

Personal information
- Born: October 20, 1953; Vilnius, Lithuania

Algimantas Pavilonis (born October 20, 1953, in Vilnius) is a retired Lithuanian basketball player, most notable for his playing career in Statyba Vilnius from 1973 to 1985. He was second Lithuanian Basketball Federation president, serving from 1994 till 2003. He also was Executive Director for the Northern European Basketball League from 2002 to 2003.

A.Pavilonis is a FIBA commissioner since 2004.

From 2008 to 2012 he was general director of the Ukrainian Superleague.

== Professional sports career ==
Pavilonis began his professional sports career in Statyba Vilnius basketball team and played for it from 1973 to 1985. Following it, he played for Lietkabelis Panevėžys, Mokslas Vilnius, BC Savy, Banik Ostrava (Czech Republic).
