= 2023 LKL Playoffs =

Basketball playoffs in Lithuania

2023 LKL playoffs
Tournament details
- Country: Lithuania
- Dates: 12 May – 10 June 2023
- Season: 2022–23
- Teams: 8
- Defending champions: BC Rytas

Final positions
- Champions: Žalgiris (24th title)
- Runners-up: Rytas
- Third place: 7Bet–Lietkabelis
- Fourth place: Cbet

The 2023 LKL Playoffs known as the 2023 Betsafe-LKL Playoffs for sponsorship purposes was LKL playoffs' 28th edition. Top eight finishers in the regular season will compete for the championship spot. Playoffs will began on 12 May 2023 and ended on 10 June 2023 after Žalgiris won final series against defending champion Rytas. Žalgiris won the 24th Betsafe–LKL championship title.

The quarterfinals will be played in a best-of-three format with higher seeded team playing the first and third (if necessary) game at home. Semifinals, third place game and final will be played in a best-of-five format, with the higher seed team playing games 1, 3 and 5 (if necessary) at home.

== Qualified teams ==
Pos	Team	Pld	W	L	PF	PA	PD	Qualification
1	Žalgiris	33	28	5	2875	2406	+469	Higher seed in playoffs
2	Rytas	33	27	6	3070	2731	+339	Higher seed in playoffs
3	Wolves	33	23	10	2851	2599	+252	Higher seed in playoffs
4	7Bet–Lietkabelis	33	23	10	2834	2689	+145	Higher seed in playoffs
5	Uniclub Casino – Juventus	33	18	15	2859	2853	+6	Lower seed in playoffs
6	Cbet	33	18	15	2657	2663	−6	Lower seed in playoffs
7	Neptūnas	33	16	17	2652	2722	−70	Lower seed in playoffs
8	Nevėžis–Optibet	33	14	19	2860	2912	−52	Lower seed in playoffs

Source: LKL.LT

== Notable events ==
- On 10 May 2023, all four Betsafe–LKL playoff matchups are set.
- On 12 May 2023, on the 2023 Betsafe–LKL playoffs opening game 7Bet–Lietkabelis 85–73 won against Uniclub Casino – Juventus and took the lead in the series 1–0
- On 14 May 2023, Rytas 95–91 won against Neptūnas and finished quarterfinal series 2–0. Rytas became first 2023 Betsafe–LKL playoffs semifinalist. Cbet finished series 2–0 against Wolves by winning 80–75 and became second team which will play in 2023 Betsafe–LKL semifinals.
- On 25 May 2023, Rytas 3–0 won the series against Cbet and became the first team to reach 2023 Betsafe–LKL final.
- On 28 May 2023, Žalgiris 3–1 won the series against 7Bet–Lietkabelis and became second team to reach 2023 Betsafe–LKL final. Žalgiris will face Rytas in the 2023 Betsafe–LKL final. Also 7Bet–Lietkabelis will play with Cbet for the third place.
- On 9 June 2023, 7Bet–Lietkabelis played the last match of the series for the third place and after a hard fight, won against Cbet with a 3-2 series result and took third place in 2022–23 LKL season.
- On 10 June 2023, Žalgiris finished 3–2 final series against Rytas and won 2023 Betsafe–LKL champions title. It is 24th champions title for Žalgiris.

== Bracket ==
Quarter-finals
1	Žalgiris	2
8	Nevėžis–Optibet	0
4	7Bet–Lietkabelis	2
5	Uniclub Casino – Juventus	1
2	Rytas	2
7	Neptūnas	0
3	Wolves	0
6	Cbet	2

Semi-finals
1	Žalgiris	3
4	7Bet–Lietkabelis	1
2	Rytas	3
6	Cbet	0

Final
1	Žalgiris	3
2	Rytas	2
Third place
4	7Bet–Lietkabelis	3
6	Cbet	2

== Quarter–finals ==
Team 1	Series	Team 2	Game 1	Game 2	Game 3
Žalgiris	2–0	Nevėžis–Optibet	91–70	92–86	—
7Bet–Lietkabelis	2–1	Uniclub Casino – Juventus	85–73	77–86	101–99
Rytas	2–0	Neptūnas	107–99 (OT)	95–91	—
Wolves	0–2	Cbet	76–80	75–80	—

=== Žalgiris vs. Nevėžis–Optibet ===
13 May 2023 Game 1	Žalgiris	91–70 (Series: 1–0)	Nevėžis–Optibet	Prienai
17:20 (EEST)	Scoring by quarter: 20–22, 23–17, 18–14, 29–18
	Pts: Four players 15; Rebs: Birutis 10; Asts: Ulanovas 5 PIR: Birutis 26	Boxscore	Pts: Freeman 23; Rebs: Freeman 10; Asts: Davison 7 PIR: Freeman 23	Arena: Prienai Arena; Attendance: 467; Referees: Gvidas Gedvilas, Gintaras Vitkauskas, Andžej Urbanovič

15 May 2023 Game 2	Nevėžis–Optibet	86–92 (Series: 0–2)	Žalgiris	Kėdainiai
18:30 (EEST)	Scoring by quarter: 18–29, 17–23, 25–22, 26–18
	Pts: Freeman 16; Rebs: Lambrecht 12; Asts: Valinskas 7 PIR: Lambrecht 25	Boxscore	Pts: Ulanovas 20; Rebs: Ulanovas, Birutis 7 Asts: Butkevičius 6 PIR: Ulanovas 24	Arena: Kėdainiai Arena; Attendance: 1,227; Referees: Jurgis Laurinavičius, Aurimas Borusas, Dovydas Kairys

=== 7Bet–Lietkabelis vs. Uniclub Casino – Juventus ===
12 May 2023 Game 1	7Bet–Lietkabelis	85–73 (Series: 1–0)	Uniclub Casino – Juventus	Panevėžys
18:00 (EEST)	Scoring by quarter: 18–18, 18–27, 33–16, 16–12
	Pts: Morris, Duffy 14; Rebs: Orelik 7 Asts: Lipkevičius, Kullamäe 4 PIR: Duffy 19	Boxscore	Pts: Alston 15; Rebs: Skučas 5 Asts: Matulis 4 PIR: Alston 16	Arena: Kalnapilio Arena; Attendance: 1,639; Referees: Artūras Šukys, Jurgis Laurinavičius, Aurimas Borusas

15 May 2023 Game 2	Uniclub Casino – Juventus	86–77 (Series: 1–1)	7Bet–Lietkabelis	Utena
18:50 (EEST)	Scoring by quarter: 17–17, 24–17, 23–28, 22–15
	Pts: Davis 19; Rebs: three players 6 Asts: Davis 5 PIR: Davis 26	Boxscore	Pts: Orelik 18; Rebs: Maldūnas 7 Asts: Morris 4 PIR: Orelik 16	Arena: Utena Arena; Attendance: 812; Referees: Gytis Vilius, Saulius Račys, Juozas Barkauskas

18 May 2023 Game 3	7Bet–Lietkabelis	101–99 (Series: 2–1)	Uniclub Casino – Juventus	Panevėžys
18:50 (EEST)	Scoring by quarter: 23–21, 29–25, 27–31, 22–22
	Pts: Golomán 16; Rebs: Lipkevičius 7 Asts: Orelik 5 PIR: Kullamäe, Golomán 17	Boxscore	Pts: Davis 20; Rebs: Alston 5 Asts: Paliukėnas 8 PIR: Paliukėnas 24	Arena: Kalnapilio Arena; Attendance: 2,336; Referees: Artūras Šukys, Jurgis Laurinavičius, Gvidas Gedvilas

=== Rytas vs. Neptūnas ===
12 May 2023 Game 1	Rytas	107–99(OT) (Series: 1–0)	Neptūnas	Vilnius
18:50 (EEST)	Scoring by quarter: 25–20, 16–25, 27–14, 20–29, Overtime: 19–11
	Pts: Radzevičius 21; Rebs: Gorham 12; Asts: Foster 6 PIR: Radzevičius 28	Boxscore	Pts: Jogėla 25; Rebs: Gustys 9 Asts: Girdžiūnas, Pleikys 3 PIR: Jogėla 25	Arena: Jeep Arena; Attendance: 2,011; Referees: Saulius Račys, Gintaras Mačiulis, Dovydas Kairys

14 May 2023 Game 2	Neptūnas	91–95 (Series: 0–2)	Rytas	Klaipėda
16:00 (EEST)	Scoring by quarter: 21–26, 14–22, 30–24, 26–23
	Pts: Gailius 20; Rebs: Gustys 12; Asts: Pleikys 6 PIR: Pleikys 27	Boxscore	Pts: McCullum 15; Rebs: Radzevičius 6 Asts: Friðriksson 7 PIR: Kairys 21	Arena: Švyturys Arena; Attendance: 1,726; Referees: Gvidas Gedvilas, Gintaras Vitkauskas, Gabrielius Simonavičius

=== Wolves vs. Cbet ===
12 May 2023 Game 1	Wolves	76–80 (Series: 0–1)	Cbet	Alytus
18:30 (EEST)	Scoring by quarter: 19–19, 9–24, 21–20, 27–17
	Pts: Caver 18; Rebs: Kelly 11; Asts: Caver 7 PIR: Caver 23	Boxscore	Pts: Šeškus 16; Rebs: Huskić 7 Asts: Huskić 8 PIR: Huskić 18	Arena: Alytus Arena; Attendance: 1,247; Referees: Gytis Vilius, Juozas Barkauskas, Gabrielius Simonavičius

14 May 2023 Game 2	Cbet	80–75 (Series: 2–0)	Wolves	Jonava
17:20 (EEST)	Scoring by quarter: 21–25, 22–15, 17–14, 20–21
	Pts: Huskić, Watson 18; Rebs: Garrett 10; Asts: Bičkauskis 5 PIR: Huskić 21	Boxscore	Pts: Caver 22; Rebs: Žukauskas 7 Asts: Caver 4 PIR: Grant 27	Arena: Jonava Arena; Attendance: 1,424; Referees: Artūras Šukys, Gintaras Mačiulis, Andžej Urbanovič

== Semi–finals ==
Team 1	Series	Team 2	Game 1	Game 2	Game 3	Game 4	Game 5
Žalgiris	3–1	7Bet–Lietkabelis	69–58	86–83	66–67	95–66	—
Rytas	3–0	Cbet	82–74	82–67	90–85	—	—

=== Žalgiris vs. 7Bet–Lietkabelis ===
22 May 2023 Game 1	Žalgiris	69–58 (Series: 1–0)	7Bet–Lietkabelis	Garliava
18:50 (EEST)	Scoring by quarter: 23–15, 15–14, 16–20, 15–9
	Pts: Ulanovas 16; Rebs: Birutis 14; Asts: Lekavičius 5 PIR: Birutis 22	Boxscore	Pts: Morris 12; Rebs: three players 4 Asts: Orelik 3 PIR: Kullamäe 11	Arena: Garliava Sports and Culture Center; Attendance: 747; Referees: Saulius Račys, Jurgis Laurinavičius, Aurimas Borusas

24 May 2023 Game 2	7Bet–Lietkabelis	83–86 (Series: 0–2)	Žalgiris	Panevėžys
18:50 (EEST)	Scoring by quarter: 14–14, 27–24, 26–21, 16–27
	Pts: Kullamäe 18; Rebs: Maldūnas 4 Asts: Lipkevičius 6 PIR: Kullamäe 19	Boxscore	Pts: Dimša 15; Rebs: Birutis 6 Asts: Taylor 6 PIR: Ulanovas 23	Arena: Kalnapilio Arena; Attendance: 3,059; Referees: Gytis Vilius, Artūras Šukys, Juozas Barkauskas

26 May 2023 Game 3	Žalgiris	66–67 (Series: 2–1)	7Bet–Lietkabelis	Kaunas
18:50 (EEST)	Scoring by quarter: 22–21, 15–22, 20–8, 9–16
	Pts: Ulanovas, Cavanaugh 12; Rebs: Birutis 7 Asts: Ulanovas, Taylor 5 PIR: Ulanovas 19	Boxscore	Pts: Rubštavičius 14; Rebs: Orelik 9 Asts: Kullamae 4 PIR: Rubštavičius 20	Arena: Žalgirio Arena; Attendance: 3269; Referees: Saulius Račys, Jurgis Laurinavičius, Gvidas Gedvilas

28 May 2023 Game 4	7Bet–Lietkabelis	66–95 (Series: 1–3)	Žalgiris	Panevėžys
17:20 (EEST)	Scoring by quarter: 18–18, 13–26, 18–26, 17–25
	Pts: Morris 13; Rebs: three players 3 Asts: Lipkevičius, Kullamae 4 PIR: Lipkevičius 13	Boxscore	Pts: Cavanaugh 16; Rebs: Hayes 10; Asts: Taylor, Lekavičius 5 PIR: Hayes 24	Arena: Kalnapilio Arena; Attendance: 3621; Referees: Gytis Vilius, Artūras Šukys, Gintaras Mačiulis

=== Rytas vs. Cbet ===
20 May 2023 Game 1	Rytas	82–74 (Series: 1–0)	Cbet	Vilnius
17:20 (EEST)	Scoring by quarter: 28–16, 17–19, 21–17, 16–22
	Pts: McCullum 20; Rebs: Gorham 6 Asts: McCullum 5 PIR: McCullum 18	Boxscore	Pts: Watson 20; Rebs: Garrett 7 Asts: Watson 9 PIR: Watson 22	Arena: Jeep Arena; Attendance: 2,278; Referees: Saulius Račys, Artūras Šukys, Gintaras Mačiulis

23 May 2023 Game 2	Cbet	67–82 (Series: 0–2)	Rytas	Jonava
18:50 (EEST)	Scoring by quarter: 25–21, 16–22, 10–18, 16–21
	Pts: Huskić, Majauskas 15; Rebs: Garrett 11; Asts: Garrett 7 PIR: Garrett 26	Boxscore	Pts: Friðriksson 15; Rebs: Gorham 10; Asts: Friðriksson 5 PIR: Friðriksson 18	Arena: Jonava Arena; Attendance: 2,147; Referees: Gytis Vilius, Jurgis Laurinavičius, Gvidas Gedvilas

25 May 2023 Game 3	Rytas	90–85 (Series: 3–0)	Cbet	Vilnius
18:50 (EEST)	Scoring by quarter: 16–22, 26–16, 29–22, 19–25
	Pts: Normantas 16; Rebs: Gorham, Echenique 6 Asts: McCullum 6 PIR: Normantas 20	Boxscore	Pts: Garrett 24; Rebs: three players 5 Asts: Watson 8 PIR: Garrett 25	Arena: Jeep Arena; Attendance: 2,201; Referees: Artūras Šukys, Saulius Račys, Juozas Barkauskas

== Third place ==
Team 1	Series	Team 2	Game 1	Game 2	Game 3	Game 4	Game 5
7Bet–Lietkabelis	3–2	Cbet	80–89	88–87	63–82	75–55	84–72

=== 7Bet–Lietkabelis vs. Cbet ===
31 May 2023 Game 1	7Bet–Lietkabelis	80–89 (Series: 0–1)	Cbet	Panevėžys
18:50 (EEST)	Scoring by quarter: 20–25, 19–23, 23–25, 18–16
	Pts: Orelik 19; Rebs: Maldūnas 9 Asts: Morris, Šakić 4 PIR: Lipkevičius 21	Boxscore	Pts: Watson Jr. 22; Rebs: Bičkauskis, Huskić 6 Asts: Huskić 5 PIR: three players 23	Arena: Kalnapilio Arena; Attendance: 1756; Referees: Artūras Šukys, Jurgis Laurinavičius, Aurimas Borusas

2 June 2023 Game 2	Cbet	87–88 (Series: 1–1)	7Bet–Lietkabelis	Jonava
18:50 (EEST)	Scoring by quarter: 27–23, 25–22, 15–13, 20–30
	Pts: Watson 29; Rebs: Šeškus, Huskić 4 Asts: Huskić 8 PIR: Watson 35	Boxscore	Pts: Morris 17; Rebs: three players 7 Asts: three players 3 PIR: Orelik 18	Arena: Jonava Arena; Attendance: 1506; Referees: Saulius Račys, Gvidas Gedvilas, Juozas Barkauskas

5 June 2023 Game 3	7Bet–Lietkabelis	63–82 (Series: 1–2)	Cbet	Panevėžys
18:50 (EEST)	Scoring by quarter: 24–24, 13–19, 8–16, 18–23
	Pts: Morris 12; Rebs: Orelik 7 Asts: Lipkevičius, Morris 3 PIR: Orelik 14	Boxscore	Pts: Watson Jr. 20; Rebs: Garrett 7 Asts: three players 4 PIR: Watson Jr. 25	Arena: Kalnapilio Arena; Attendance: 3500; Referees: Gytis Vilius, Jurgis Laurinavičius, Gintaras Mačiulis

7 June 2023 Game 4	Cbet	55–75 (Series: 2–2)	7Bet–Lietkabelis	Jonava
18:50 (EEST)	Scoring by quarter: 18–23, 11–20, 15–16, 11–16
	Pts: Watson 13; Rebs: Laksa 5 Asts: Huskić 6 PIR: Watson 11	Boxscore	Pts: Morris 23; Rebs: Kullamäe 8 Asts: Orelik 5 PIR: Golomán 25	Arena: Jonava Arena; Attendance: 2200; Referees: Saulius Račys, Gvidas Gedvilas, Jurgis Laurinavičius

9 June 2023 Game 5	7Bet–Lietkabelis	84–72 (Series: 3–2)	Cbet	Šiauliai
18:50 (EEST)	Scoring by quarter: 17–22, 29–13, 16–19, 22–18
	Pts: Morris 27; Rebs: Golomán 7 Asts: Kullamäe 6 PIR: Morris 22	Boxscore	Pts: Šeškus 18; Rebs: Garrett 4 Asts: Garrett 5 PIR: Garrett 18	Arena: Šiauliai Arena; Attendance: 3495; Referees: Artūras Šukys, Gvidas Gedvilas, Gintaras Mačiulis

== Finals ==
=== Road to the final ===
Žalgiris		Round	Rytas	
1st place (28–5)		Regular season	2nd place (27–6)	
Opponent	Series	Playoffs	Opponent	Series
Nevėžis–Optibet	2–0	Quarterfinals	Neptūnas	2–0
7Bet–Lietkabelis	3–1	Semifinals	Cbet	3–0

Team 1	Series	Team 2	Game 1	Game 2	Game 3	Game 4	Game 5
Žalgiris	3–2	Rytas	108–93	71–94	95–80	68–69	97–87

=== Žalgiris vs. Rytas ===
1 June 2023 Game 1	Žalgiris	108–93 (Series: 1–0)	Rytas	Kaunas
18:50 (EEST)	Scoring by quarter: 26–21, 20–25, 34–25, 28–22
	Pts: Butkevičius 21; Rebs: Hayes 7 Asts: Ulanovas 7 PIR: Butkevičius 32	Boxscore	Pts: Foster 19; Rebs: Radzevičius 5 Asts: Friðriksson 8 PIR: Foster, Friðriksson 18	Arena: Žalgirio Arena; Attendance: 7,657; Referees: Gytis Vilius, Jurgis Laurinavičius, Gvidas Gedvilas

3 June 2023 Game 2	Rytas	94–71 (Series: 1–1)	Žalgiris	Vilnius
17:20 (EEST)	Scoring by quarter: 24–19, 24–22, 27–15, 19–15
	Pts: Foster 22; Rebs: Radzevičius 6 Asts: Friðriksson, McCullum 5 PIR: Foster 21	Boxscore	Pts: Taylor 20; Rebs: Cavanaugh 6 Asts: three players 3 PIR: Taylor 20	Arena: Jeep Arena; Attendance: 2512; Referees: Gytis Vilius, Saulius Račys, Artūras Šukys

6 June 2023 Game 3	Žalgiris	95–80 (Series: 2–1)	Rytas	Kaunas
18:50 (EEST)	Scoring by quarter: 27–22, 20–20, 27–16, 21–22
	Pts: Ulanovas 18; Rebs: Šmits 8 Asts: Taylor 9 PIR: Taylor 25	Boxscore	Pts: Friðriksson, Foster 13; Rebs: Gorham 9 Asts: five players 2 PIR: Radzevičius 16	Arena: Žalgirio Arena; Attendance: 11513; Referees: Gytis Vilius, Artūras Šukys, Gvidas Gedvilas

8 June 2023 Game 4	Rytas	69–68 (Series: 2–2)	Žalgiris	Vilnius
18:50 (EEST)	Scoring by quarter: 14–23, 18–17, 13–10, 24–18
	Pts: Echenique 18; Rebs: Gorham, Radzevičius 7 Asts: Foster 8 PIR: Echenique 22	Boxscore	Pts: Taylor 14; Rebs: Butkevičius 10; Asts: Dimša 3 PIR: Butkevičius 15	Arena: Jeep Arena; Attendance: 2579; Referees: Gytis Vilius, Artūras Šukys, Saulius Račys

10 June 2023 Game 5	Žalgiris	97–87 (Series: 3–2)	Rytas	Kaunas
17:20 (EEST)	Scoring by quarter: 23–24, 23–21, 24–24, 27–18
	Pts: Taylor 32; Rebs: Taylor 5 Asts: Giedraitis, Brazdeikis 3 PIR: Taylor 31	Boxscore	Pts: McCullum 20; Rebs: Foster 7 Asts: Foster 6 PIR: McCullum 23	Arena: Žalgirio Arena; Attendance: 14077; Referees: Gytis Vilius, Artūras Šukys, Saulius Račys

2022–23 LKL champions
Žalgiris
(24th title)
