= 2024–25 King Mindaugas Cup =

2024–25 Karaliaus Mindaugo taurė
Tournament details
- Country: Lithuania
- City: Vilnius
- Venue: Twinsbet Arena
- Dates: 2 October 2024 – 16 February 2025
- Teams: 10
- Defending champions: Žalgiris

Final positions
- Champions: Žalgiris
- Runners-up: Neptūnas
- Third place: 7bet–Lietkabelis

Awards
- MVP: (Lithuania) Ignas Brazdeikis

The 2024–25 King Mindaugas Cup, also known as Citadele Karaliaus Mindaugo taurė for sponsorship purposes, was the tenth edition of the Lithuanian King Mindaugas Cup. Žalgiris successfully defended the title for the 5th time in a row after defeating Neptūnas in the final 91–89.

== Format ==
All 10 teams from 2024–25 LKL season participated in this tournament. Four teams that participated in Euroleague Basketball and FIBA tournaments, have received bye's to quarterfinals stage, while the remaining teams will participate in round-robin stage, with the Top 4 teams advancing to the Quarterfinals.

== Group stage ==
Pos	Team	Pld	W	L	PF	PA	PD	Qualification	JON	SIA	NEP	NEV	MAZ	JUV
1	Cbet	10	6	4	912	869	+43	Advance to Quarterfinals	—	87–84	88–84	93–80	89–74	90–87
2	Šiauliai–Casino Admiral	10	6	4	967	965	+2	Advance to Quarterfinals	90–104	—	102–82	88–109	99–100	87–83
3	Neptūnas	10	6	4	961	890	+71	Advance to Quarterfinals	111–110	101–104	—	86–88	106–71	105–74
4	Nevėžis–Optibet	10	5	5	910	897	+13	Advance to Quarterfinals	87–84	104–108	101–102	—	89–71	93–89
5	M Basket-Delamode	10	4	6	796	894	−98		78–76	85–91	70–91	89–85	—	73–86
6	Uniclub Casino – Juventus	10	3	7	874	905	−31		94–91	110–114	82–93	87–74	82–85	—

Source: LKL.LT

== Quarterfinals ==
Four teams have received byes to the Quarterfinals stage due to participating in FIBA and Euroleague Basketball competitions. Those teams are:

- 7bet–Lietkabelis
- Rytas
- Wolves Twinsbet
- Žalgiris

All qualified teams will be drawn into pairs, where they will face-off each other in a home-and-away format, with the overall cumulative score determining the winner of a match. The winners of each pair would then qualify for the Final four. The draw took place on 15 December.

Team 1	Agg.	Team 2	1st leg	2nd leg
Rytas	155–159	Neptūnas	78–67	77–92
Wolves Twinsbet	180–149	Cbet	95–77	85–72
Žalgiris	199–173	Šiauliai	107–88	92–85
7bet–Lietkabelis	155–146	Nevėžis–Optibet	78–79	77–67

== Final four ==
The final four was hosted by the Twinsbet Arena in Vilnius on 15–16 February 2025.

Semifinals; 15 February
Neptūnas	87
Wolves Twinsbet	83
Žalgiris	79
7bet–Lietkabelis	56

Final; 16 February
Neptūnas	89
Žalgiris	91
Third place 16 February
Wolves Twinsbet	91
7bet–Lietkabelis	100

=== Semifinals ===
15 February 2025	Neptūnas	87–83	Wolves Twinsbet	Vilnius
15:30 (EET)	Scoring by quarter: 27–24, 16–20, 22–14, 22–25
	Pts: Buie 22; Rebs: Pavelka 9 Asts: Buie 7 PIR: Buie 30	Boxscore	Pts: Cowan 21; Rebs: Thurman 9 Asts: Cowan 8 PIR: Thurman 26	Arena: Twinsbet Arena; Attendance: 5295; Referees: Artūras Šukys, Saulius Račys, Dovydas Kairys

Starters:			Pts	Reb	Ast
PG	7	(United States) Desure Buie	22	6	7
SG	10	(United States) Nate Johnson (basketball player 1998)	16	3	1
SF	24	(United States) Zane Waterman	5	3	1
PF	11	(Lithuania) Matas Repšys	2	0	0
C	22	(Slovakia) Tomáš Pavelka (basketball)	2	9	0
Reserves:					
G	1	(Lithuania) Radvilas Kneižys	DNP		
PG	4	(Lithuania) Žygimantas Janavičius	0	0	1
G	8	(Lithuania) Mindaugas Girdžiūnas	2	1	1
F/C	9	(Lithuania) Martynas Pacevičius	8	4	0
G/F	13	(Lithuania) Deividas Gailius	3	4	1
SF	20	(United Kingdom) Myles Hesson	19	3	0
G/F	21	(Lithuania) Arnas Beručka	8	4	0
Head coach:
(Greece) Georgios Vovoras

Neptūnas	Wolves Twinsbet

Starters:			Pts	Reb	Ast
PG	1	(United States) Anthony Cowan Jr.	21	1	8
SG	23	(Lithuania) Matas Jogėla	8	2	2
SF	44	(Sweden) Jeffery Taylor	7	3	0
PF	10	(Lithuania) Regimantas Miniotas	0	4	1
C	22	(Lithuania) Marek Blaževič	10	5	2
Reserves:					
C	4	(United States) Garrison Brooks	1	3	0
SF	11	(Lithuania) Justinas Marcinkevičius (basketball)	DNP		
G	12	(United States) Andrew Andrews	11	2	0
PG	13	(Lithuania) Kristupas Žemaitis	5	1	1
F	15	(United States) Tre'Shawn Thurman	20	9	0
F	98	(Lithuania) Arnoldas Kulboka	0	2	0
Head coach:
(Italy) Alessandro Magro

15 February 2025	Žalgiris	79–56	7bet–Lietkabelis	Vilnius
19:25 (EET)	Scoring by quarter: 24–13, 14–14, 20–18, 21–11
	Pts: Walker IV 19; Rebs: Birutis, Sirvydis 7 Asts: Francisco 5 PIR: Walker IV 22	Boxscore	Pts: Rubštavičius 14; Rebs: Gagić, Maldūnas 5 Asts: Bičkauskis 4 PIR: Gagić, Rubštavičius 11	Arena: Twinsbet Arena; Attendance: 5,467; Referees: Gytis Vilius, Gvidas Gedvilas, Juozas Barkauskas

Starters:			Pts	Reb	Ast
PG	3	(France) Sylvain Francisco	14	1	5
SG	8	(Lithuania) Ignas Brazdeikis	16	4	0
SF	92	(Lithuania) Edgaras Ulanovas	9	2	2
PF	51	(Lithuania) Arnas Butkevičius	2	2	1
C	42	(Armenia) Bryant Dunston	0	2	1
Reserves:					
G/F	0	(Lithuania) Mantas Juzėnas	0	1	0
SG	1	(United States) Lonnie Walker IV	19	5	3
C	15	(Lithuania) Laurynas Birutis	4	7	1
F/C	18	(Serbia) Alen Smailagić	3	0	0
F	21	(United States) Matt Mitchell (basketball)	2	1	1
PF	45	(United States) Brady Manek	DNP		
G/F	91	(Lithuania) Deividas Sirvydis	10	7	0
Head coach:
(Italy) Andrea Trinchieri

Žalgiris	7bet–Lietkabelis

Starters:			Pts	Reb	Ast
PG	2	(Lithuania) Dovis Bičkauskis	6	1	4
SG	17	(Lithuania) Mantas Rubštavičius	14	3	1
SF	16	(Greece) Georgios Kalaitzakis	3	2	0
PF	77	(Lithuania) Paulius Danusevičius	5	2	0
C	41	(Serbia) Đorđe Gagić	10	5	1
Reserves:					
PG	3	(Lithuania) Dominykas Stenionis	0	1	0
SF	10	(Lithuania) Vytenis Lipkevičius	2	2	1
F/C	12	(Lithuania) Gabrielius Maldūnas	0	5	0
G/F	13	(Lithuania) Martynas Varnas	4	0	0
PF	18	(Lithuania) Grantas Vasiliauskas	2	1	2
F/C	35	(Lithuania) Danielius Lavrinovičius	2	1	0
G	50	(Ukraine) Oleksandr Kovliar	8	2	1
Head coach:
(Serbia) Nenad Čanak (basketball)

=== Third place ===
16 February 2025	Wolves Twinsbet	91–100	7bet–Lietkabelis	Vilnius
15:15 (EET)	Scoring by quarter: 31–23, 18–29, 18–22, 24–26
	Pts: Thurman 28; Rebs: Blaževič 7 Asts: Žemaitis 6 PIR: Blaževič 31	Boxscore	Pts: Kovliar 30; Rebs: Danusevičius 8 Asts: Kovliar 7 PIR: Kovliar 38	Arena: Twinsbet Arena; Attendance: 7467; Referees: Artūras Šukys, Juozas Barkauskas, Gintaras Mačiulis

Starters:			Pts	Reb	Ast
PG	13	(Lithuania) Kristupas Žemaitis	12	3	6
SG	23	(Lithuania) Matas Jogėla	4	1	3
SF	44	(Sweden) Jeffery Taylor	3	3	2
PF	98	(Lithuania) Arnoldas Kulboka	6	3	5
C	22	(Lithuania) Marek Blaževič	21	7	2
Reserves:					
PG	1	(United States) Anthony Cowan Jr.	DNP		
C	4	(United States) Garrison Brooks	2	0	1
F/C	10	(Lithuania) Regimantas Miniotas	1	3	0
SF	11	(Lithuania) Justinas Marcinkevičius (basketball)	0	0	0
G	12	(United States) Andrew Andrews	14	2	1
F	15	(United States) Tre'Shawn Thurman	28	3	2
Head coach:
(Italy) Alessandro Magro

Wolves Twinsbet	7bet–Lietkabelis

Starters:			Pts	Reb	Ast
PG	2	(Lithuania) Dovis Bičkauskis	12	2	2
SG	17	(Lithuania) Mantas Rubštavičius	17	4	2
SF	16	(Greece) Georgios Kalaitzakis	0	0	0
PF	77	(Lithuania) Paulius Danusevičius	11	8	2
C	41	(Serbia) Đorđe Gagić	3	5	1
Reserves:					
PG	3	(Lithuania) Dominykas Stenionis	DNP		
SF	10	(Lithuania) Vytenis Lipkevičius	7	3	1
F/C	12	(Lithuania) Gabrielius Maldūnas	5	2	1
G/F	13	(Lithuania) Martynas Varnas	11	3	2
PF	18	(Lithuania) Grantas Vasiliauskas	4	2	0
F/C	35	(Lithuania) Danielius Lavrinovičius	0	0	1
G	50	(Ukraine) Oleksandr Kovliar	30	3	7
Head coach:
(Serbia) Nenad Čanak (basketball)

=== Final ===
16 February 2025	Neptūnas	89–91	Žalgiris	Vilnius
18:10 (EET)	Scoring by quarter: 25–21, 20–22, 24–25, 20–23
	Pts: Buie 23; Rebs: Pavelka 7 Asts: Buie 6 PIR: Johnson 24	Boxscore	Pts: Brazdeikis 20; Rebs: Francisco 7 Asts: Ulanovas 6 PIR: Brazdeikis 22	Arena: Twinsbet Arena; Attendance: 8161; Referees: Gytis Vilius, Saulius Račys, Gvidas Gedvilas

Starters:			Pts	Reb	Ast
PG	4	(Lithuania) Žygimantas Janavičius	0	1	2
SG	10	(United States) Nate Johnson (basketball player 1998)	22	5	3
SF	21	(Lithuania) Arnas Beručka	3	1	1
PF	24	(United States) Zane Waterman	2	3	0
C	22	(Slovakia) Tomáš Pavelka (basketball)	8	7	2
Reserves:					
G	1	(Lithuania) Radvilas Kneižys	DNP		
PG	7	(United States) Desure Buie	23	5	6
G	8	(Lithuania) Mindaugas Girdžiūnas	10	0	0
F/C	9	(Lithuania) Martynas Pacevičius	5	1	0
F	11	(Lithuania) Matas Repšys	DNP		
G/F	13	(Lithuania) Deividas Gailius	10	4	1
SF	20	(United Kingdom) Myles Hesson	6	4	0
Head coach:
(Greece) Georgios Vovoras

Neptūnas	Žalgiris

Starters:			Pts	Reb	Ast
PG	3	(France) Sylvain Francisco	16	7	5
SG	8	(Lithuania) Ignas Brazdeikis	20	5	3
SF	92	(Lithuania) Edgaras Ulanovas	10	1	6
PF	51	(Lithuania) Arnas Butkevičius	8	1	0
C	15	(Lithuania) Laurynas Birutis	2	0	0
Reserves:					
G/F	0	(Lithuania) Mantas Juzėnas	DNP		
SG	1	(United States) Lonnie Walker IV	8	4	2
F/C	18	(Serbia) Alen Smailagić	10	1	1
F	21	(United States) Matt Mitchell (basketball)	0	4	3
C	42	(Armenia) Bryant Dunston	7	5	1
PF	45	(United States) Brady Manek	DNP		
G/F	91	(Lithuania) Deividas Sirvydis	10	2	1
Head coach:
(Italy) Andrea Trinchieri

2024–25 King Mindaugas Cup champions
Žalgiris
(8th title)

== Three-Point contest ==
Contestants
Pos.	Player	Team	Height (m)	Weight (kg)	First round	Semifinal	Final
G/F	(Lithuania) Nojus Mineikis	M Basket–Delamode	2.01	95	15	–	–
G	(United States) Chauncey Collins	M Basket–Delamode	1.85	85	13	–	–
G	(Lithuania) Nedas Montvila	Nevėžis–Optibet	1.94	91	9	–	–
G	(United States) Desure Buie	Neptūnas	1.80	73	16	–	–
G	(Lithuania) Eimantas Stankevičius	Šiauliai–Casino Admiral	1.92	90	23	15	–
F/C	(Lithuania) Erikas Venskus	Cbet	2.05	100	14	–	–
G	(Lithuania) Laurynas Beliauskas	Uniclub Bet – Juventus	1.92	84	17	19	26
G	(Lithuania) Dominykas Stenionis	7bet–Lietkabelis	1.79	75	7	–	–
F	(Lithuania) Arnoldas Kulboka	Wolves Twinsbet	2.06	104	17	18	22
G	(Lithuania) Ignas Sargiūnas	Rytas	1.96	86	15	–	–
G/F	(Lithuania) Mantas Juzėnas	Žalgiris	2.00	91	10	–	–
F	(Lithuania) Šarūnas Knyšius	NKA I Hegelmann Litauen	1.55	40	17	11	–
