= Gantas Križanauskas =

Lithuanian basketball player

No. 22 – Rytas Vilnius
- Position: Shooting guard
- League: Lithuanian Basketball League

Personal information
- Born: March 22, 2006 (age 20) Vilnius, Lithuania
- Listed height: 194 cm (6 ft 4 in)
- Listed weight: 91 kg (201 lb)

Career information
- Playing career: 2022–present

Career history
- 2022–2023: Rytas-MRU (RKL)
- 2023–2026: Rytas Vilnius
- 2023–2025: →BC Rytas-2 Vilnius (NKL)

Career highlights
- Lithuanian League champion (2024)
Medals
Men's basketball
Representing Lithuania
FIBA U20 EuroBasket
Silver medal – second place	2025 Greece	Team

Gantas Križanauskas (born March 22, 2006) is a Lithuanian basketball player for the Rytas Vilnius of the Lithuanian Basketball League (LKL) and its reserve teams.

== Professional career ==
In the 2022–2023 season Križanauskas played for the Rytas-MRU in the Regional Basketball League (third-tier Lithuanian league).

Since 2023 Križanauskas partly played for the Rytas Vilnius and partly for its reserve team BC Rytas-2 Vilnius of the National Basketball League (second-tier Lithuanian league). While playing for the primary Rytas Vilnius team Križanauskas debuted in the Lithuanian Basketball League, Basketball Champions League and became a top-tier Lithuanian league champion during the 2023–24 LKL season.

== National team career ==
Križanauskas played for the Lithuania men's national under-18 team in the 2024 FIBA U18 EuroBasket and was one of its key players (averaged 10 points, 3.6 rebounds, and 2 assists per game), however the Lithuania's national team was eliminated in the Quarterfinal by Germany 87–86.

Križanauskas also played for the Lithuania men's national under-20 basketball team in the 2025 FIBA U20 EuroBasket and by averaging 5.4 points, 2.3 rebounds, 2.1 assists per game helped the team to win silver medals.
