= Clevon Brown =

American basketball player

No. 13 – Jonava Hipocredit
- Position: Power forward / center
- League: LKL

Personal information
- Born: July 18, 1998 (age 28)
- Listed height: 6 ft 8 in (2.03 m)
- Listed weight: 232 lb (105 kg)

Career information
- High school: Winston Churchill (San Antonio, Texas)
- College: Vanderbilt (2016–2021); FIU (2021–2022)
- NBA draft: 2022: undrafted
- Playing career: 2022–present

Career history
- 2022: Mount Gambier Pioneers
- 2022: KB Trepça
- 2022–2023: Oviedo Baloncesto
- 2023–2024: Pallacanestro Orzinuovi
- 2024–2025: BC Nokia
- 2025–2026: BK Opava
- 2026–present: Jonava Hipocredit

Career highlights
- Albanian-Kosovo Liga Unike SuperCup winner (2022)

Clevon Brown Jr. (born July 18, 1998) is an American professional basketball player for Jonava Hipocredit of the Lithuanian Basketball League (LKL). He played college basketball for the Vanderbilt Commodores and FIU Panthers.

== Early life and high school career ==
Brown attended Winston Churchill High School in San Antonio, Texas, where he joined the school’s basketball program as a freshman in 2012. As a sophomore in 2013–14, Brown was selected to the District 26-5A first team.

As a junior during the 2014–15 season, Brown averaged 16.8 points, 9.4 rebounds and 3.2 blocks per game. He was selected to the District 26-6A first team and earned all-tournament honors at the Northside ISD and Georgetown tournaments. The San Antonio Express-News selected him to its 2015 All-Area Super Team.

As a senior in 2015–16, Brown averaged 18.4 points per game and was selected to the District 26-6A first team. He was also named to the San Antonio Express-News All-Area Super Team and selected to the Texas Association of Basketball Coaches (TABC) Class 6A All-State team.

Brown attracted interest from several college programs. He ultimately committed to Vanderbilt over Texas, and had also received offers from Auburn, Georgia Tech, Illinois, Kansas State, Miami, Notre Dame, Oklahoma State and Purdue, among others. NBC Sports described him as a three-star recruit at the time of his commitment, while The Tennessean reported that he was rated a four-star prospect by Scout.com and a three-star recruit by Rivals.com. Vanderbilt's 2015 signing announcement listed Brown as the ninth-best player in Texas according to Texas Hoops, the 126th-ranked player nationally by Rivals and the 26th-ranked power forward nationally by Scout.

== College career ==
=== Vanderbilt ===
Brown joined the Vanderbilt Commodores for the 2016–17 season. As a freshman, he appeared in 34 games and averaged 1.6 points and 1.5 rebounds per game.

As a sophomore in 2017–18, Brown appeared in 32 games, making four starts. He averaged 3.9 points and 3.1 rebounds per game and recorded 1.3 blocks per game. On March 3, 2018, Brown recorded a career-high eight blocks against Ole Miss, the most by a Vanderbilt player since Luke Kornet recorded 10 blocks against Auburn in 2016.

During the 2018–19 season, Brown played in 32 games and made 12 starts. He averaged 3.3 points, 2.8 rebounds and 1.3 blocks per game. On March 2, 2019, he recorded eight blocks against Texas A&M, matching his career high and again tying for the second-most blocks in a single game in Vanderbilt history.

Brown's 2019–20 season was cut short by a knee injury after nine games, during which he averaged 9.0 points, 6.0 rebounds, and 2.0 blocks per game. Due to the injury, Brown was granted an extra year of eligibility and returned to Vanderbilt for the 2020–21 season.

In the 2020–21 season, he appeared in 17 games, making 11 starts, and averaged 3.4 points, 2.9 rebounds and 0.9 blocks per game.

Brown finished his Vanderbilt career with 130 blocked shots, ranking sixth in program history.

=== FIU ===
Brown transferred to Florida International University for the 2021–22 season as a graduate student. He appeared in 31 games, starting all 31, and averaged 8.3 points, 5.3 rebounds and 1.7 blocks per game. He led FIU in both rebounding and blocked shots and finished third in Conference USA in blocked shots.

On January 27, 2022, Brown returned to his hometown of San Antonio when FIU faced the University of Texas at San Antonio. He recorded 12 points, three rebounds and three blocks in FIU's 73–66 loss.

Brown recorded two double-doubles during the season and scored a career-high 20 points against Florida Atlantic on March 5, 2022.

Brown finished his NCAA career with 155 games played and 68 starts.

== Professional career ==
=== Mount Gambier Pioneers ===
In May 2022, Brown signed with the Mount Gambier Pioneers of the NBL1 South. He was recruited to strengthen the Pioneers' frontcourt, with head coach Richard Hill highlighting Brown's athleticism and ability to fit the team's style of play. During the 2022 NBL1 South season, Brown averaged 9.21 points, 7.95 rebounds, 1.26 assists, and 2.16 blocks per game for Mount Gambier. The Pioneers finished the regular season in second place with a 16–6 record.

In the playoffs, Brown recorded 11 points, six rebounds, and two blocks in Mount Gambier's 94–84 qualifying-final victory over the Kilsyth Cobras. He then recorded 17 points and 10 rebounds in an 88–62 win over the Sandringham Sabres in the preliminary final, helping the Pioneers reach the Grand Final. Mount Gambier lost the Grand Final to the Hobart Chargers 78–62, finishing the season as runners-up.

=== Trepça ===
Brown joined KB Trepça of the Kosovo Basketball Superleague for the 2022–23 season. He appeared in 12 league games, averaging 5.8 points, 4.9 rebounds, 0.9 assists and 1.3 blocks per game. He also appeared in one FIBA Europe Cup qualifying game, recording five points, three rebounds, one assist and three blocks. In October 2022, Trepça won the Albanian-Kosovo Liga Unike SuperCup.

=== Oviedo ===
Brown subsequently moved to Spain, joining Oviedo CB of LEB Oro in December 2022 after playing for Trepça in Kosovo. Upon joining Oviedo, Brown told La Nueva España that he was comfortable playing both center and power forward and that the club had recruited him for his physicality, speed, defensive presence and positional versatility. During the remainder of the 2022–23 season, Brown appeared in 23 league games, averaging 8.3 points and 6.0 rebounds per game.A contemporaneous profile in La Nueva España described Brown as the league's leading shot-blocker and highlighted his athleticism, defensive impact, and contribution to Oviedo's fight against relegation. An end-of-season analysis by Zona de Básquet highlighted Brown's athleticism, rebounding and shot-blocking ability.

=== Orzinuovi ===
Brown joined Pallacanestro Orzinuovi for the 2023–24 season in Serie A2. Head coach Andrea Zanchi described Brown as a "modern, quick, and athletic big man" who could score near the basket and on the move, while praising his quickness in covering space defensively. Brown appeared in 16 regular-season games, averaging 8.6 points, 4.8 rebounds and 1.8 blocks per game. During the season, Verona head coach Alessandro Ramagli described Brown as Orzinuovi's starting center and highlighted his ability to protect the rim through his shot-blocking. He also appeared in two Supercoppa Serie A2 games, averaging 9.5 points, 4.0 rebounds and 3.0 blocks per game.

=== BC Nokia ===
Brown joined BC Nokia of Finland for the 2024–25 season. He appeared in 30 Korisliiga games, averaging 11.5 points, 7.5 rebounds and 1.5 assists per game. He also appeared in one Basketball Champions League qualifying game, recording seven points, four rebounds and three assists.

=== Opava ===
During the 2025–26 season, Brown played for BK Opava in the Czech NBL. He appeared in 48 league games, averaging 12.0 points, 7.1 rebounds, 1.1 assists and 1.6 blocks per game. In the ENBL, he appeared in nine games, averaging 11.3 points, 6.3 rebounds, 0.7 assists and 0.9 steals in 24.8 minutes per game. Brown scored 31 points in a derby victory over Ostrava in April 2026. He later helped Opava secure the bronze medal, scoring 19 points in an overtime win over Brno, including a game-tying three-pointer with five seconds remaining that sent the game to overtime. He was named Eurobasket.com’s 2026 Czech NBL Defensive Player of the Year and selected to the All-NBL Second Team.

=== Jonava ===
In July 2026, Brown signed a one-year contract with Jonava Hipocredit of the Lithuanian Basketball League.

Brown made his regular-season debut on September 19, scoring 13 points in Jonava's 95–90 overtime loss to Tauragė.

== Professional statistics ==
Season	Team	Competition	GP	PPG	RPG	APG	BPG
2022	Mount Gambier Pioneers	NBL1 South	24	9.2	8.0	1.3	2.2
2022–23	KB Trepça	Kosovo Superleague	12	5.8	4.9	0.9	1.3
2022–23	KB Trepça	FIBA Europe Cup	1	5.0	3.0	1.0	3.0
2022–23	Oviedo Baloncesto	LEB Oro	23	8.3	6.0	0.5	1.7
2023–24	Pallacanestro Orzinuovi	Serie A2	16	8.6	4.8	0.8	1.8
2024–25	BC Nokia	Korisliiga	30	11.5	7.5	1.5	1.4
2024–25	BC Nokia	Basketball Champions League qualifying	1	7.0	4.0	3.0	0.0
2025–26	BK Opava	Czech NBL	48	12.0	7.1	1.1	1.6
2025–26	BK Opava	ENBL	9	11.3	6.3	0.7	1.1

== College statistics ==
Season	Team	GP	GS	PPG	RPG	APG	BPG
2016–17	Vanderbilt	34	1	1.6	1.5	0.1	0.4
2017–18	Vanderbilt	32	4	3.9	3.1	0.2	1.3
2018–19	Vanderbilt	32	12	3.3	2.8	0.5	1.3
2019–20	Vanderbilt	9	9	9.0	6.0	0.1	2.0
2020–21	Vanderbilt	17	11	3.4	2.9	0.3	0.9
2021–22	FIU	31	31	8.3	5.3	0.9	1.7
College career		155	68	4.4	3.3	0.4	1.2
