= Dovis Bičkauskis =

Lithuanian basketball player

No. 2 – BC Tauragė
- Position: Point guard
- League: LKL

Personal information
- Born: 5 September 1993 (age 33) Šiauliai, Lithuania
- Listed height: 6 ft 3 in (1.91 m)
- Listed weight: 194 lb (88 kg)

Career information
- NBA draft: 2015: undrafted
- Playing career: 2010–present

Career history
- 2010–2011: Puntukas Anykščiai
- 2011–2012: BC Statyba
- 2012–2013: KK Radviliškis – Juodeliai
- 2013–2014: Perlas-MRU
- 2014–2015: BC Trakai
- 2015–2016: Sūduva-Mantinga
- 2016–2019: Juventus Utena
- 2019–2021: Rytas Vilnius
- 2021–2022: CSM Oradea
- 2022–2023: CBet Jonava
- 2023–2026: Lietkabelis Panevėžys
- 2026–present: BC Tauragė

Career highlights
- Lithuanian League assists leader (2019)
Medals
Men's basketball
Representing Lithuania
Summer Universiade
Gold medal – first place	2017 Taipei	Team competition

Dovis Bičkauskis (born 5 September 1993 in Šiauliai) is a Lithuanian professional basketball player for BC Tauragė of the Lithuanian Basketball League (LKL). Standing at 6 ft 3 in (1.91 m), he plays at the point guard position.

== Career ==
Bičkauskis spent many years in the National Basketball League (NKL), playing for BC Statyba, KK Radviliškis – Juodeliai, Perlas-MRU, BC Trakai, before joining Sūduva-Mantinga, with whom he won the championship in 2016. After the season, he signed with Lithuanian Basketball League (LKL) team Juventus Utena, where over the next three seasons, he quickly became one of the top point guards in the league. In 2019, he led the LKL in assists, with 5.7 per game.

On 3 July 2019, Bičkauskis signed a 2-year deal with Rytas Vilnius, the runners-up in the LKL.

On 21 June 2023, Bičkauskis signed a two-year (1+1) contract with Lietkabelis Panevėžys of the Lithuanian Basketball League and the EuroCup.

On 26 October 2026, Bičkauskis signed a one-year contract with BC Tauragė of the Lithuanian Basketball League (LKL).

== National team career ==
Bičkauskis won gold medal with the Lithuanian team during the 2017 Summer Universiade after defeating the United States' team 74–85 in the final. He was also invited to the Lithuania men's national basketball team to play in the FIBA Basketball World Cup qualification in 2019.

== Career statistics ==
Legend
GP	Games played	GS	Games started	MPG	Minutes per game
FG%	Field-goal percentage	3P%	3-point field-goal percentage	FT%	Free-throw percentage
RPG	Rebounds per game	APG	Assists per game	SPG	Steals per game
BPG	Blocks per game	PPG	Points per game	PIR	Performance index rating
**Bold**	Career high

=== EuroCup ===
Year	Team	GP	GS	MPG	FG%	3P%	FT%	RPG	APG	SPG	BPG	PPG	PIR
2019–20	Rytas Vilnius	16	3	16.6	.328	.286	.643	1.8	2.4	.6	.0	3.7	4.4
2023–24	Lietkabelis Panevėžys	6	6	**28.2**	**.585**	**.444**	.600	**3.3**	**5.5**	**1.3**	.0	**10.8**	**15.3**
2024–25	Lietkabelis Panevėžys	**17**	**8**	20.9	.486	.429	**.795**	1.8	2.9	.9	**.3**	9.4	8.9
2025–26	Lietkabelis Panevėžys	15	**8**	17.0	.377	.407	.759	1.7	1.8	.7	.1	4.9	4.9
Career		54	25	19.4	.444	.388	.732	1.9	2.7	.8	.1	6.6	7.2
