= BC Rytas-2 =

Rytas-2
- Leagues: National Basketball League
- Founded: 2003
- History: BC Perlas (2003–2011); BC Perlas-MRU (2011–2012); BC Vilnius-MRU (2012–2013); BC Perlas-MRU (2013–2016); BC Perlas (2016–2020); BC Perlas Energija (2020–2022); BC Rytas-2 (2022–present)
- Arena: Jeep Arena
- Location: Vilnius, Lithuania
- Team colors: Black, Red and White
- Head coach: (Lithuania) Gintaras Kadžiulis
- Affiliation: Rytas
- Championships: None
- Website: Official website
Home	Away

BC Rytas-2 is a professional basketball club based in Vilnius, Lithuania. The team competes in the National Basketball League (NKL), the second division of Lithuanian basketball. Founded in 2003, it is the reserve team of Rytas Vilnius.

== History ==
The Perlas club was founded in 2003. Over the decade, the team had many variations of its name, but it always had the word "Perlas" (Pearl) in it except during the 2012–2013 season, when it was called "Vilnius-MRU". It developed young prospects and became a springboard to a professional career for former Lietuvos Rytas Vilnius players, guard Dovydas Redikas and BC Žalgiris former player Mindaugas Kuzminskas. Undoubtedly, Perlas’ best-known alumni is Lietuvos Rytas Vilnius, Memphis Grizzlies and Lithuania men's national basketball team center Jonas Valančiūnas.

"Perlas-MRU" qualified for the second-tier Lithuanian basketball league (NKL) playoffs for the first time in the 2006–2007 season. An ambitious and young team, they went on a commercial basis to play in the LKL in 2009. During two seasons in the league, "Perlas-MRU" finished the regular season in 8th and 7th place, respectively. On 14 July 2011, the club merged with NKL champions „Pieno Žvaigždės“, with many players signing with BC Pieno žvaigždės as a result.

In the 2011–2012 season after returning to the NKL, "Perlas-MRU" did not qualify for the playoffs. In the 2012–2013 season, the results for the team were much better. In the regular season, Vilnius team was ranked 12th (14/20), but in the Round of 16 it eliminated fifth-ranked Sūduva-Mantinga (2–1). In the quarterfinals, "Perlas-MRU" met with Jonavos "Triobet" but was eliminated after three intense matches.

In the 2013–2014 season, Perlas once again qualified for the NKL playoffs. In the round of 16, Mindaugas Sakalauskas players crushed Klaipedos Nafta-Universitetas (3–0), but in quarterfinals, they were forced to concede to Delikatesas Joniškis (3–2).

== Players ==
=== Current roster ===
BC Rytas-2 roster
Players
Coaches

Pos.	No.	Nat.	Name	Ht.	Wt.	Age
C	1	(Lithuania)	Strelčiūnas, Grantas	2.06 m (6 ft 9 in)	102 kg (225 lb)	18 – 27 August 2007
F	2	(Lithuania)	Pocius, Adomas	1.99 m (6 ft 6 in)	93 kg (205 lb)	18 – 22 March 2007
PG	5	(Lithuania)	Liutkevičius, Mantas	1.84 m (6 ft 0 in)	79 kg (174 lb)	18 – 11 March 2007
G/F	8	(Lithuania)	Jokubauskas, Gabrielius	1.96 m (6 ft 5 in)	81 kg (179 lb)	19 – 16 June 2006
G	9	(Lithuania)	Snitka, Kornelijus	1.90 m (6 ft 3 in)	88 kg (194 lb)	17 – 9 May 2008
C	10	(Lithuania)	Vilutis, Artūras	2.08 m (6 ft 10 in)	119 kg (262 lb)	20 – 8 October 2005
F/C	13	(Lithuania)	Kasparas, Danielius	2.03 m (6 ft 8 in)	110 kg (243 lb)	22 – 26 February 2004
F	14	(Lithuania)	Bubnys, Gabrielius	2.00 m (6 ft 7 in)	93 kg (205 lb)	18 – 2 April 2007
G/F	16	(Lithuania)	Urbonas, Ignas	1.99 m (6 ft 6 in)	93 kg (205 lb)	18 – 22 November 2007
G	22	(Lithuania)	Križanauskas, Gantas	1.94 m (6 ft 4 in)	91 kg (201 lb)	19 – 22 March 2006
G	23	(Lithuania)	Sirgedas, Erikas	1.92 m (6 ft 4 in)	85 kg (187 lb)	18 – 5 August 2007
F	27	(Lithuania)	Vilkas, Arminas	2.05 m (6 ft 9 in)	96 kg (212 lb)	18 – 15 May 2007
C	28	(Lithuania)	Kulikauskas, Paulius	2.07 m (6 ft 9 in)	111 kg (245 lb)	19 – 28 July 2006
F	34	(Lithuania)	Adomaitis, Vincentas	2.00 m (6 ft 7 in)	91 kg (201 lb)	22 – 8 August 2003
G/F	35	(Lithuania)	Buivydas, Gabrielius	1.95 m (6 ft 5 in)	81 kg (179 lb)	16 – 28 March 2009
G/F	45	(Lithuania)	Žukauskas, Deividas	1.97 m (6 ft 6 in)	88 kg (194 lb)	21 – 1 March 2005

Head coach

- (Lithuania) Gintaras Kadžiulis

Assistant coach(es)

- (Lithuania) Mindaugas Lukauskis
- (Lithuania) Aistis Pilauskas
- (Lithuania) Jokūbas Kadžiulis

Athletic trainer(s)

- (Lithuania) Liutauras Kasparas

Physiotherapist

- (Lithuania) Agnė Ginevičiūtė

Legend

- (C) Team captain
- Injured

- Roster
Updated: 2020-10-19

=== Depth chart ===
Pos.	Starting 5	Bench 1	Bench 2	Inactive
C	Danielius Kasparas	Artūras Vilutis	Grantas Strelčiūnas	Paulius Kulikauskas
PF	Arminas Vilkas	Adomas Pocius	Vincentas Adomaitis
SF	Gabrielius Bubnys	Gabrielius Jokubauskas	Gabrielius Buivydas	Deividas Žukauskas
SG	Ignas Urbonas	Kornelijus Snitka	Erikas Sirgedas
PG	Gantas Križanauskas	Mantas Liutkevičius

=== Notable players ===
- Jonas Valančiūnas
- Mindaugas Kuzminskas
- Eimantas Bendžius
- Arvydas Šikšnius
- Deividas Sirvydis
- Evaldas Kairys
- Dovis Bičkauskis
- Margiris Normantas
- Marek Blaževič
- Gytis Radzevičius
- Dominykas Domarkas
- Edvinas Šeškus
- Saulius Kulvietis
- Paulius Dambrauskas
- Vytautas Šarakauskas
- Vilmantas Dilys
- Augustas Marčiulionis
- Einaras Tubutis
- Ąžuolas Tubelis
- Karolis Giedraitis
- Kasparas Jakučionis
- Arnas Beručka

== History ==
Season	League	Pos.	Significant Events	Baltic League	Pos.	LKF Cup
2009–10	LKL	8	Quarterfinalist	Challenge Cup	3	Quarterfinalist
2010–11	LKL	7	Quarterfinalist	Elite Division	11	First round
2014–15	NKL	1	Quarterfinalist			
