= KK Tauragė =

- Founded: 2010
- Dissolved: 2020
- History: Tauragė (2010–2020)
- Arena: Sport center "Bastilija"
- Location: Tauragė, Lithuania
- Team colors: Yellow, black
- President: Laima Bučnienė
- Head coach: Edvardas Žemgulis
- Championships: RKL 2017
Home	Away

KK Tauragė (Lithuanian: Tauragės krepšinio klubas) was a professional basketball team based in Tauragė, Lithuania. The team competed in the Regional Basketball League (RKL) and the National Basketball League (NKL). Following an unsuccessful 2019–2020 NKL season, the club folded.

== Club achievements ==
- 2016-2017 season: RKL 1st place

== Players ==
=== The last roster for the 2019–2020 season ===
BC Tauragė roster
Players
Coaches

Pos.	No.	Nat.	Name	Ht.	Wt.	Age
PG	1	(Lithuania)	Serkevičius, Ernestas	1.84 m (6 ft 0 in)	79 kg (174 lb)	31 – 21 July 1995
G	4	(Lithuania)	Laucius, Deividas	1.83 m (6 ft 0 in)	77 kg (170 lb)	24 – 30 July 2002
G/F	7	(Lithuania)	Valantinas, Liudas	1.91 m (6 ft 3 in)	90 kg (198 lb)	38 – 26 September 1988
PF	8	(Lithuania)	Bendikas, Rokas	1.90 m (6 ft 3 in)	76 kg (168 lb)	24 – 30 October 2002
SG	9	(Lithuania)	Sebežiovas, Tadas	1.83 m (6 ft 0 in)	83 kg (183 lb)	41 – 11 August 1985
SF	10	(Lithuania)	Aleksandrovas, Andrius	1.98 m (6 ft 6 in)	100 kg (220 lb)	40 – 6 January 1986
G/F	11	(Lithuania)	Bergaudas, Arminas	1.91 m (6 ft 3 in)	89 kg (196 lb)	24 – 12 December 2001
PG	13	(Lithuania)	Babkauskas, Karolis	1.85 m (6 ft 1 in)	82 kg (181 lb)	35 – 18 March 1991
PF	14	(Lithuania)	Keburys, Deividas	2.01 m (6 ft 7 in)	102 kg (225 lb)	36 – 9 July 1990
PF	19	(Lithuania)	Žioba, Tautvydas	1.99 m (6 ft 6 in)	115 kg (254 lb)	34 – 28 September 1992
SG	69	(Lithuania)	Bardauskas, Justinas	1.91 m (6 ft 3 in)	80 kg (176 lb)	25 – 2 June 2001

Head coach

- (Lithuania) Edvardas Žemgulis

Legend

- (C) Team captain
- Injured

- Roster
Updated: 10-08-2019
