= Grantas Vasiliauskas =

Lithuanian basketball player

No. 18 – Jonava Hipocredit
- Position: Power forward
- League: LKL

Personal information
- Born: January 10, 1999 (age 27) Alytus, Lithuania
- Listed height: 2.04 m (6 ft 8 in)
- Listed weight: 105 kg (231 lb)

Career information
- NBA draft: 2021: undrafted
- Playing career: 2014–present

Career history
- 2014–2016: SRC-Dzūkija Alytus
- 2016–2018: Žalgiris-2 Kaunas
- 2018–2019: Kuršiai Palanga
- 2019: University of Tartu
- 2019: BC Jonava
- 2019–2021: Nevėžis Kėdainiai
- 2021–2023: Lietkabelis Panevėžys
- 2023–2024: RheinStars Köln
- 2024–2025: Lietkabelis Panevėžys
- 2025–2026: Shinagawa CIty
- 2026–present: Jonava Hipocredit
Medals
Representing Lithuania
FIBA Under-17 World Cup
Bronze medal – third place	2016 Spain	U17 National Team
FIBA Europe Under-18 Championship
Silver medal – second place	2016 Turkey	U18 National Team
Bronze medal – third place	2017 Slovakia	U18 National Team
FIBA Europe Under-16 Championship
Silver medal – second place	2015 Lithuania	U16 National Team

Grantas Vasiliauskas (born January 10, 1999, in Alytus) is a Lithuanian professional basketball player for Jonava Hipocredit of the Lithuanian Basketball League (LKL).

== Playing career ==
Before starting his professional career, Vasiliauskas played in the RKL with SRC-Dzūkija Alytus from 2014 to 2016.

In 2015, Vasiliauskas participated in the prestigious Adidas Eurocamp in Treviso, Italy.

In 2016, he participated in the Basketball Without Borders camp in Lohja, Finland, along with his junior squad's teammates Arnas Velička, Ignas Sargiūnas and Lukas Uleckas.

In September, 2016, he signed a long-term deal with the Lithuanian powerhouse Žalgiris Kaunas.

On 13 August 2024, Vasiliauskas signed one–year contract with Lietkabelis Panevėžys of the Lithuanian Basketball League (LKL) and the EuroCup.

On 5 September, 2025, Vasiliauskas signed with Shinagawa City Basketball Club of the Japanese B.League.

On 18 September, 2026, Vasiliauskas signed with Jonava Hipocredit of the Lithuanian Basketball League (LKL).

== National team career ==
Vasiliauskas has actively represented Lithuania junior teams on the international stage and won medals multiple times.
