= Justin Gorham =

American basketball player

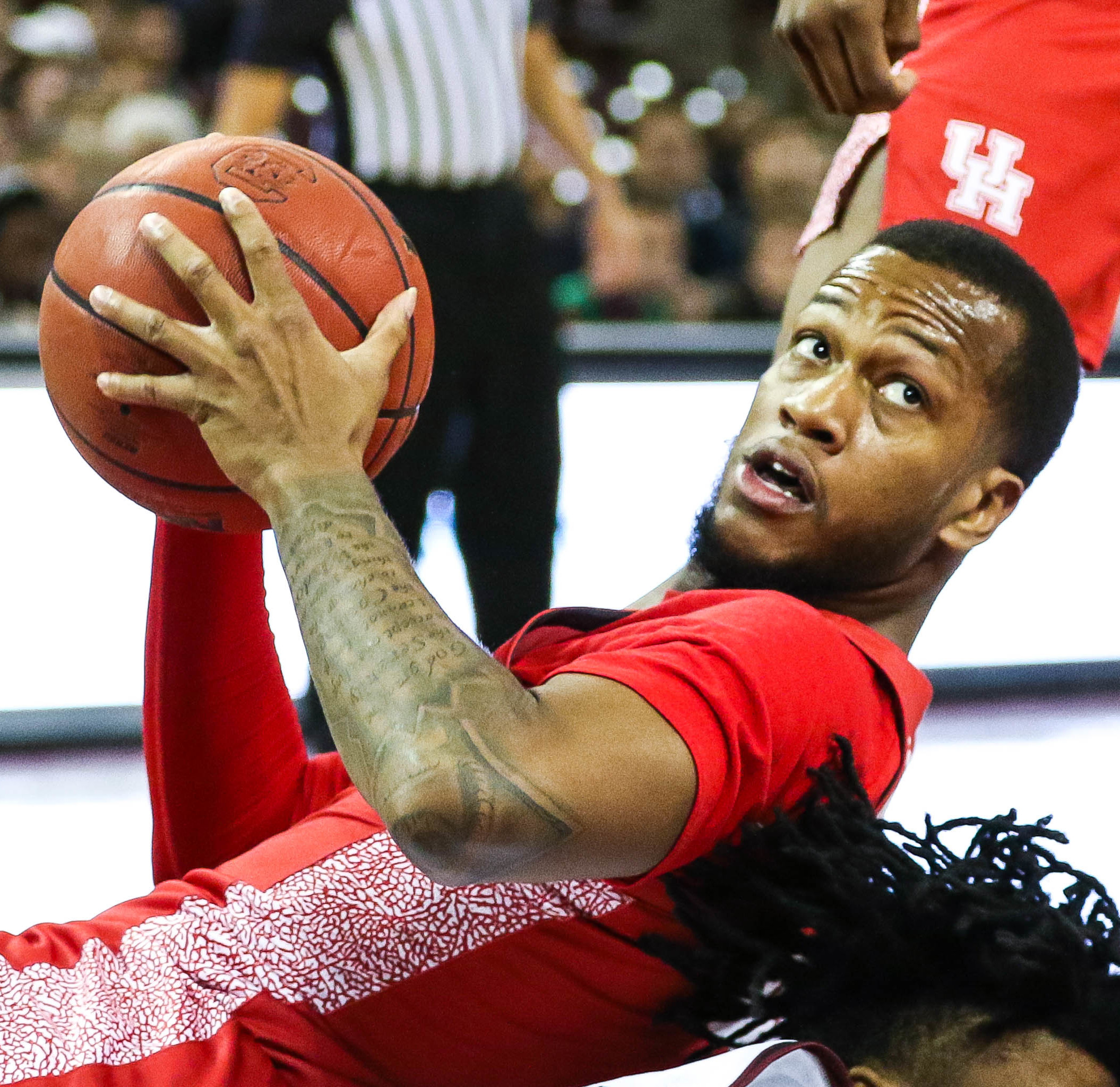
- Gorham with Houston in 2019

No. 4 – Derthona Basket
- Position: Power forward
- League: LBA; EuroCup

Personal information
- Born: August 6, 1998 (age 28) Columbia, Maryland, U.S.
- Listed height: 6 ft 7 in (2.01 m)
- Listed weight: 225 lb (102 kg)

Career information
- High school: Calvert Hall (Towson, Maryland)
- College: Towson (2016–2018); Houston (2018–2021)
- NBA draft: 2021: undrafted
- Playing career: 2021–present

Career history
- 2021–2022: Telekom Baskets Bonn
- 2022–2023: Hapoel Gilboa Galil
- 2023–2024: Rytas Vilnius
- 2024–present: Derthona Basket

Career highlights
- Lithuanian League champion (2024); Second-team All-AAC (2021); AAC Most Improved Player (2021)

Justin Terrell Gorham (born August 6, 1998) is an American professional basketball player for Derthona Basket of the Italian Lega Basket Serie A (LBA) and the EuroCup. He played college basketball for the Towson Tigers and the Houston Cougars.

== High school career ==
Gorham attended Calvert Hall College High School in Towson, Maryland. A three-star recruit, he committed to playing college basketball for Towson. He was drawn to the program in part due to its proximity, allowing him to be close to his father, who had been diagnosed with duodenal cancer.

== College career ==
As a freshman at Towson, Gorham averaged 2.8 points and 2.9 rebounds per game. He averaged 9.8 points and 6.7 rebounds per game as a sophomore, despite playing through an ankle sprain. For his junior season, Gorham transferred to Houston and sat out for one year due to transfer rules. He improved his shooting ability under the guidance of assistant coach Kellen Sampson. As a junior, Gorham averaged three points and 2.5 rebounds per game.

He became a regular starter in his senior season. On January 3, 2021, Gorham posted 11 points and a career-high 19 rebounds in a 74–60 win over SMU. He collected Second Team All-American Athletic Conference (AAC) honors and was named AAC Most Improved Player at the conclusion of the season. Gorham averaged 8.4 points and 8.6 rebounds per game.

== Professional career ==
After his time at Towson and Houston, Gorham signed on July 15, 2021, with Telekom Baskets Bonn of the German Basketball Bundesliga. In 2021-22 he averaged 9.0 points and 5.7 rebounds per game.

On July 21, 2022, Gorham signed with Hapoel Gilboa Galil of the Israeli Basketball Premier League.

On March 16, 2023, Gorham signed with Rytas Vilnius of the Lithuanian Basketball League (LKL).

On June 25, 2024, he signed with Derthona Basket of the Italian Lega Basket Serie A (LBA).

== Career statistics ==
Legend
GP	Games played	GS	Games started	MPG	Minutes per game
FG%	Field goal percentage	3P%	3-point field goal percentage	FT%	Free throw percentage
RPG	Rebounds per game	APG	Assists per game	SPG	Steals per game
BPG	Blocks per game	PPG	Points per game	**Bold**	Career high

=== College ===
Year	Team	GP	GS	MPG	FG%	3P%	FT%	RPG	APG	SPG	BPG	PPG
2016–17	Towson	**32**	3	10.3	.521	–	.452	2.8	.3	.2	.0	2.8
2017–18	Towson	**32**	9	23.0	**.538**	.214	.709	6.7	.8	.3	.2	**9.8**
2018–19	Houston	Redshirt										
2019–20	Houston	30	0	12.9	.341	.303	**.793**	2.5	.5	.1	.1	3.0
2020–21	Houston	31	**31**	**27.8**	.495	**.354**	.674	**8.6**	**1.2**	**.8**	**.5**	8.4
Career		125	43	18.5	.493	.316	.675	5.2	.7	.4	.2	6.0

== Personal life ==
Gorham is the son of Tonya and Jerry Gorham. His father died from duodenal cancer in 2016, at age 53. He has an older brother, Gerald Jr.
