= Martynas Arlauskas =

Lithuanian basketball player

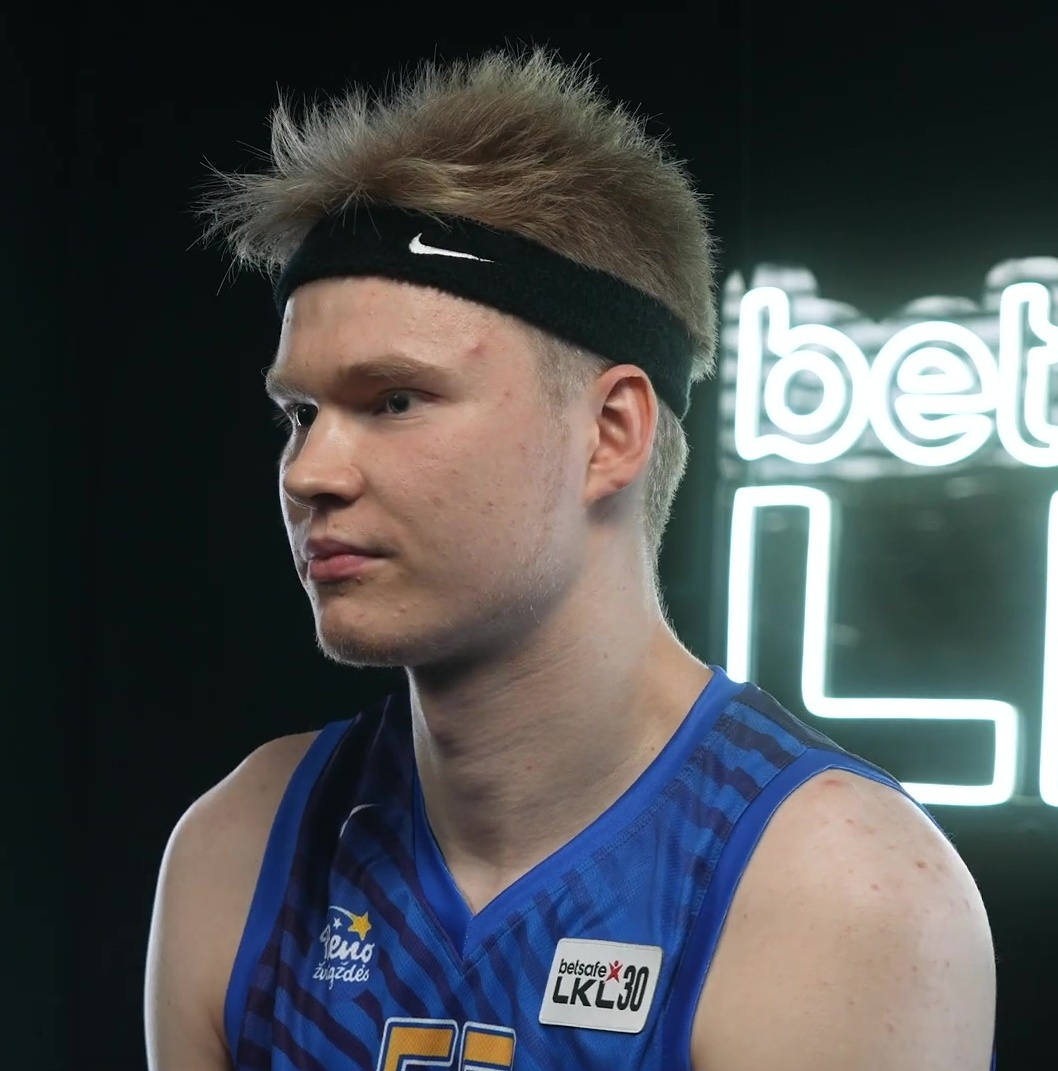
- Arlauskas in 2023

No. 55 – Jonava Hipocredit
- Position: Shooting guard / small forward
- League: LKL

Personal information
- Born: 10 July 2000 (age 26) Kaunas, Lithuania
- Listed height: 1.99 m (6 ft 6 in)
- Listed weight: 93 kg (205 lb)

Career information
- High school: President Valdas Adamkus Gymnasium (Kaunas, Lithuania)
- College: Gonzaga (2019–2022)
- NBA draft: 2023: undrafted
- Playing career: 2016–2019; 2022–present

Career history
- 2016–2019: Žalgiris Kaunas
- 2016–2019: →Žalgiris-2 Kaunas
- 2022–2024: Pieno žvaigždės Pasvalys
- 2024–2025: CBet Jonava
- 2025–2026: CSM Galați
- 2026–present: Jonava Hipocredit

Career highlights
- King Mindaugas Cup champion (2018); LKL champion (2018)
Medals
Men's basketball
Representing Lithuania
FIBA U16 European Championship
Silver medal – second place	2016 Poland	Team

Martynas Arlauskas (born 10 July 2000) is a Lithuanian professional basketball player for Jonava Hipocredit of the Lithuanian Basketball League (LKL). He played college basketball for the Gonzaga Bulldogs.

== Early career ==
Arlauskas played high school basketball with President Valdas Adamkus Gymnasium in Kaunas, Lithuania, as well as for the Žalgiris Kaunas first and second clubs. On 20 September 2018, he committed to play college basketball for Gonzaga, turning down professional options. He was ranked 42nd in his class by recruiting service 247Sports.

== Professional career ==
On 21 August 2022, Arlauskas returned to Lithuania, signing a two-year contract with Pieno žvaigždės Pasvalys of the Lithuanian Basketball League (LKL).

On 5 August 2024, Arlauskas signed with CBet Jonava of the Lithuanian Basketball League (LKL).

On 7 July 2026, Arlauskas after spending one season in CSM Galați once again signed with Jonava Hipocredit of the Lithuanian Basketball League (LKL).

== Career statistics ==
Legend
GP	Games played	GS	Games started	MPG	Minutes per game
FG%	Field goal percentage	3P%	3-point field goal percentage	FT%	Free throw percentage
RPG	Rebounds per game	APG	Assists per game	SPG	Steals per game
BPG	Blocks per game	PPG	Points per game	**Bold**	Career high

=== College ===
Year	Team	GP	GS	MPG	FG%	3P%	FT%	RPG	APG	SPG	BPG	PPG
2019–20	Gonzaga	**25**	0	**5.2**	.440	**.125**	**.615**	**.8**	**.1**	**.2**	**.1**	**1.2**
2020–21	Gonzaga	17	**1**	2.4	.000	.000	.500	.3	**.1**	.1	.0	.1
2021–22	Gonzaga	16	0	3.6	**.455**	.000	.556	**.8**	.0	.1	**.1**	.9
Career		58	1	3.9	.400	.125	.577	.7	.1	.1	.1	.8
