= BC Statyba (2011) =

Lithuanian basketball team

- Leagues: National Basketball League
- Founded: 2011
- Folded: 2013
- Location: Vilnius, Lithuania
- Team colors: Black, white

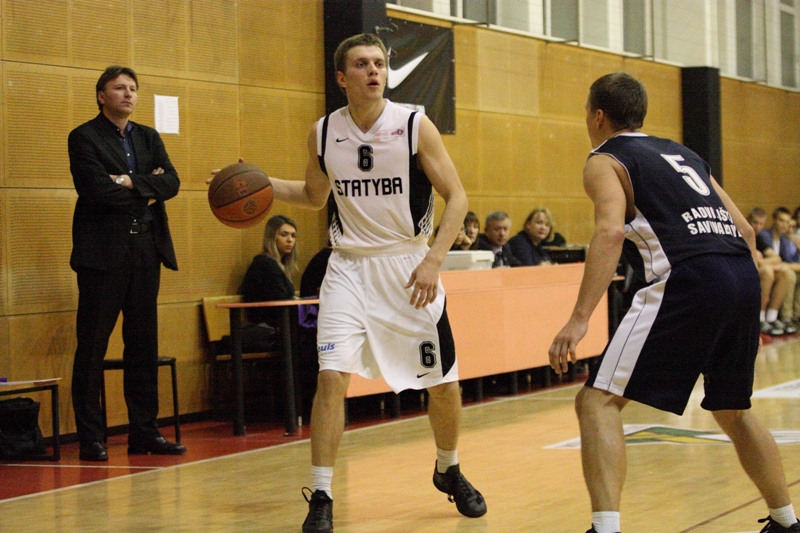
Statyba and Radviliškis game in 2011.

BC Statyba was a basketball club from Vilnius, Lithuania. The club was founded in 2011 as a successor to previous BC Statyba, which in 1997 was renamed to Lietuvos Rytas and currently considers itself to be a new club and not a continuation of Statyba. The club debuted in National Basketball League (NKl) during the 2011–12 season. However, after 2012–13 the club suspended its operations due to financial problems.

== Results ==
| Season | League | Pos. | Playoffs |
|---|---|---|---|
| 2011–12 | NKL | 9th | Finalist |
| 2012–13 | NKL | 8th | Quarterfinal |
