= KTU Men's Basketball =

KTU
- Leagues: National Basketball League
- Founded: 1990
- History: KTU (1990-present)
- Arena: KTU Sports Hall
- Location: Kaunas, Lithuania
- Team colors: White, black
- Head coach: Vytautas Pliauga
- Championships: RKL 2016
Home	Away

Kaunas University of Technology Men's Basketball Team (Lithuanian: Kauno technologijos universiteto vyrų krepšinio komanda) is a professional basketball team that represents the Kaunas University of Technology, it is based in Kaunas, Lithuania and currently competes in National Basketball League.

== Club achievements ==
- 2015-2016 season: RKL 1st place

== Team roster ==
BC KTU roster
Players
Coaches

Pos.	No.	Nat.	Name	Ht.	Wt.	Age
PF	1	(Lithuania)	Stakėnas, Justas	1.96 m (6 ft 5 in)	87 kg (192 lb)	28 – 14 January 1997
PG	6	(Lithuania)	Sapiega, Matas	1.78 m (5 ft 10 in)	82 kg (181 lb)	35 – 13 March 1990
PG	7	(Lithuania)	Staniukaitis, Matas Edgaras	1.92 m (6 ft 4 in)	95 kg (209 lb)	32 – 14 September 1993
SG	9	(Lithuania)	Kigas, Julius	1.87 m (6 ft 2 in)	100 kg (220 lb)	29 – 1 January 1996
C	10	(Lithuania)	Syminas, Motiejus	2.00 m (6 ft 7 in)	90 kg (198 lb)	26 – 28 January 1999
SG	12	(Lithuania)	Ragauskas, Matas	1.89 m (6 ft 2 in)	94 kg (207 lb)	29 – 11 April 1996
SG	13	(Lithuania)	Norkus, Rokas	1.90 m (6 ft 3 in)	76 kg (168 lb)	27 – 2 April 1998
C	15	(Lithuania)	Ratkus, Dominykas	2.00 m (6 ft 7 in)	96 kg (212 lb)	26 – 29 March 1999
PG	16	(Lithuania)	Asačiovas, Gytis	1.91 m (6 ft 3 in)	79 kg (174 lb)	25 – 20 March 2000
C	32	(Lithuania)	Dambrauskas, Rytis	2.05 m (6 ft 9 in)	90 kg (198 lb)	25 – 7 April 2000

Head coach

- (Lithuania) Artūras Sukovas

Legend

- (C) Team captain
- Injured

- Roster
Updated: 01-19-2019
