= Ignas Brazdeikis =

Lithuanian-Canadian basketball player (born 1999)

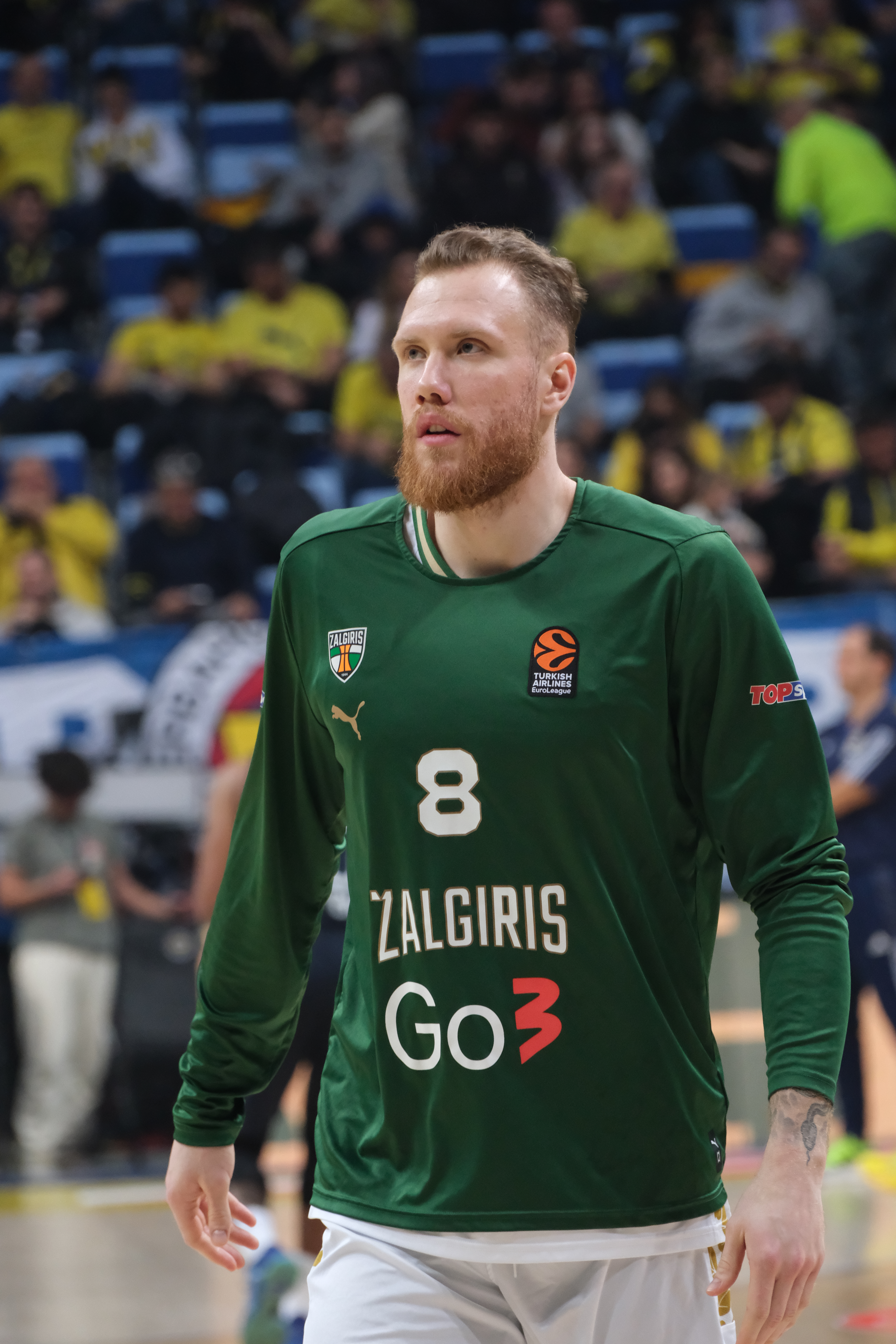
- Brazdeikis with Žalgiris in 2025

No. 8 – Unicaja
- Position: Small forward
- League: Liga ACB; BCL

Personal information
- Born: January 8, 1999 (age 27) Kaunas, Lithuania
- Listed height: 6 ft 7 in (2.01 m)
- Listed weight: 221 lb (100 kg)

Career information
- High school: Holy Trinity CSS (Oakville, Ontario); Orangeville Prep (Mono, Ontario)
- College: Michigan (2018–2019)
- NBA draft: 2019: 2nd round, 47th overall pick
- Drafted by: Sacramento Kings
- Playing career: 2019–present

Career history
- 2019–2021: New York Knicks
- 2019–2021: →Westchester Knicks
- 2021: Philadelphia 76ers
- 2021–2022: Orlando Magic
- 2021–2022: →Lakeland Magic
- 2022–2023: Žalgiris
- 2023–2024: Olympiacos
- 2024–2026: Žalgiris
- 2026–present: Unicaja

Career highlights
- King Mindaugas Cup MVP (2025); 3× LΚL champion (2023, 2025, 2026); 3× King Mindaugas Cup winner (2023, 2025, 2026); Greek Cup winner (2024); Greek Super Cup winner (2023); AP Honorable mention All-American (2019); Big Ten Freshman of the Year (2019); Second-team All-Big Ten (2019); Big Ten All-Freshman team (2019)
- Stats at NBA.com
- Stats at Basketball Reference
Medals
Men's basketball
Representing Canada
FIBA Americas U16 Championship
| Silver medal – second place | 2015 Bahia Blanca | Team competition |

Ignas "Iggy" Brazdeikis (born January 8, 1999) is a Lithuanian-Canadian professional basketball player for Unicaja of the Liga ACB and Basketball Champions League (BCL). He played college basketball for the Michigan Wolverines. Brazdeikis was selected with the 47th overall pick in the 2019 NBA draft by the Sacramento Kings, and was then traded to the New York Knicks.

As a freshman, Brazdeikis was a 2019 second-team All-Big Ten selection, the Big Ten Freshman of the Year and a Big Ten All-Freshman honoree. He has played in the National Basketball Association (NBA) for the Knicks, Philadelphia 76ers and Orlando Magic as well as NBA G League Westchester Knicks and Lakeland Magic.

Brazdeikis has played internationally for Canada's teams in under-16 and under-17 competitions. After beginning his professional career, he sought Lithuanian citizenship and played for Lithuania national team.

== Early life ==
Brazdeikis was born in Kaunas, Lithuania, to Diana and Sigitas "Sigis" Brazdeikis. He has an older sister, Ema. His second aunt, Lina Brazdeikytė, is a former professional basketball player who won the EuroBasket Women 1997 with the Lithuania women's national team. His family emigrated to Chicago before moving to Winnipeg and Etobicoke (where he started to play basketball at the age of six) before settling in Oakville, Ontario. Nevertheless, Brazdeikis was a fan of his hometown team Žalgiris since his childhood.

== High school career ==
Brazdeikis attended Holy Trinity CSS in Oakville, where he became the first grade nine student to play for the senior team. He then transferred to Orangeville Prep in Mono, where he was named Ontario Scholastic Basketball Association MVP in 2017 and 2018. As a junior he led Orangeville to the 2017 OSBA championship and won the tournament MVP award. Brazdeikis is generally right-handed, including his dribble, but shoots the basketball left-handed. During Brazdeikis's high school years, he was mentored by former Wolverine Nik Stauskas.

By May 2017 Brazdeikis was undecided between matriculating with the class of 2017 or 2018 and had taken unofficial visits to Michigan, Vanderbilt and Cincinnati. After accumulating offers from several schools including Baylor, Cal, Illinois, Oklahoma, Oregon, Tennessee, and USC and rankings of number 66 overall and 16 small forward at 247sports.com, Brazdeikis announced that he would officially visit Michigan, Vanderbilt and Florida on September 8, 15 and 29, 2017, respectively. He gave a Michigan a verbal commitment on September 22. After he committed, Michigan stopped recruiting R. J. Barrett. He signed a National Letter of Intent with Michigan on November 10, 2017, along with the 2018 class that included Colin Castleton, David DeJulius, Brandon Johns, and Adrien Nunez.

Brazdeikis was expected to be Michigan's best incoming freshman according to Yahoo Sports and ESPN in 2018.

== College career ==
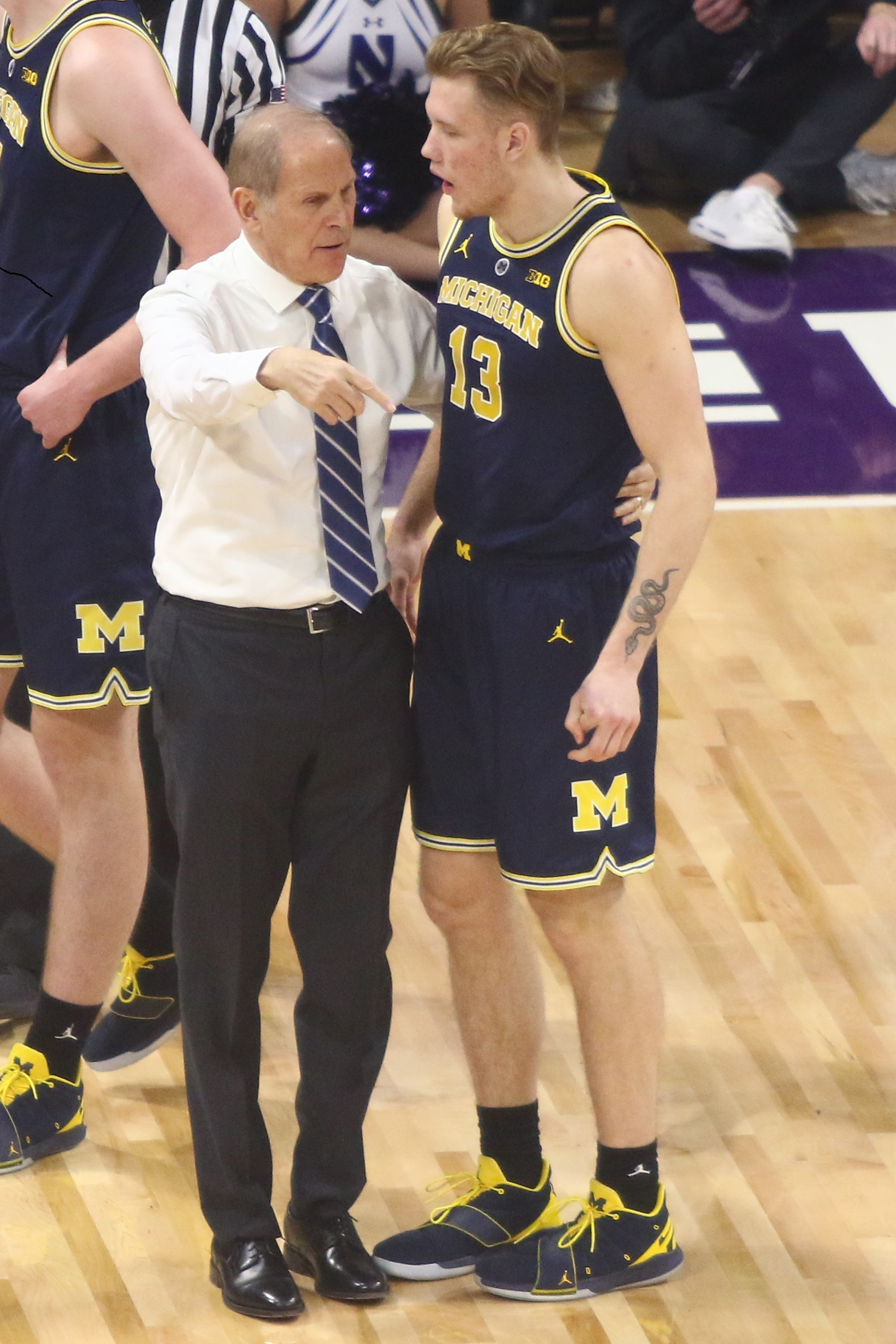
Brazdeikis debuted on November 6, 2018, with 12 points in head coach John Beilein's 800th career win. (pictured December 4)

In Michigan's November 6, 63–44 victory over Norfolk State, Brazdeikis debuted with 12 points in head coach John Beilein's 800th career win. In his second game on November 10, during a 56–37 victory against Holy Cross, Brazdeikis added 19 points, including 15 points in the first five minutes to start the second half as well as seven rebounds. On November 18, Brazdeikis helped Michigan defeat Providence 66–47 to win the Hall of Fame Tip Off tournament with a game-high 20 points and another 7 rebounds. He repeated his 20-point, 7-rebound performance the next time out on November 23 against Chattanooga during their 83–55 victory. Brazdeikis posted his third consecutive 20-point game on November 28, as Michigan defeated (#11 AP Poll/#13 Coaches Poll) North Carolina 84–67 in the ACC–Big Ten Challenge behind his career-high 24 points.

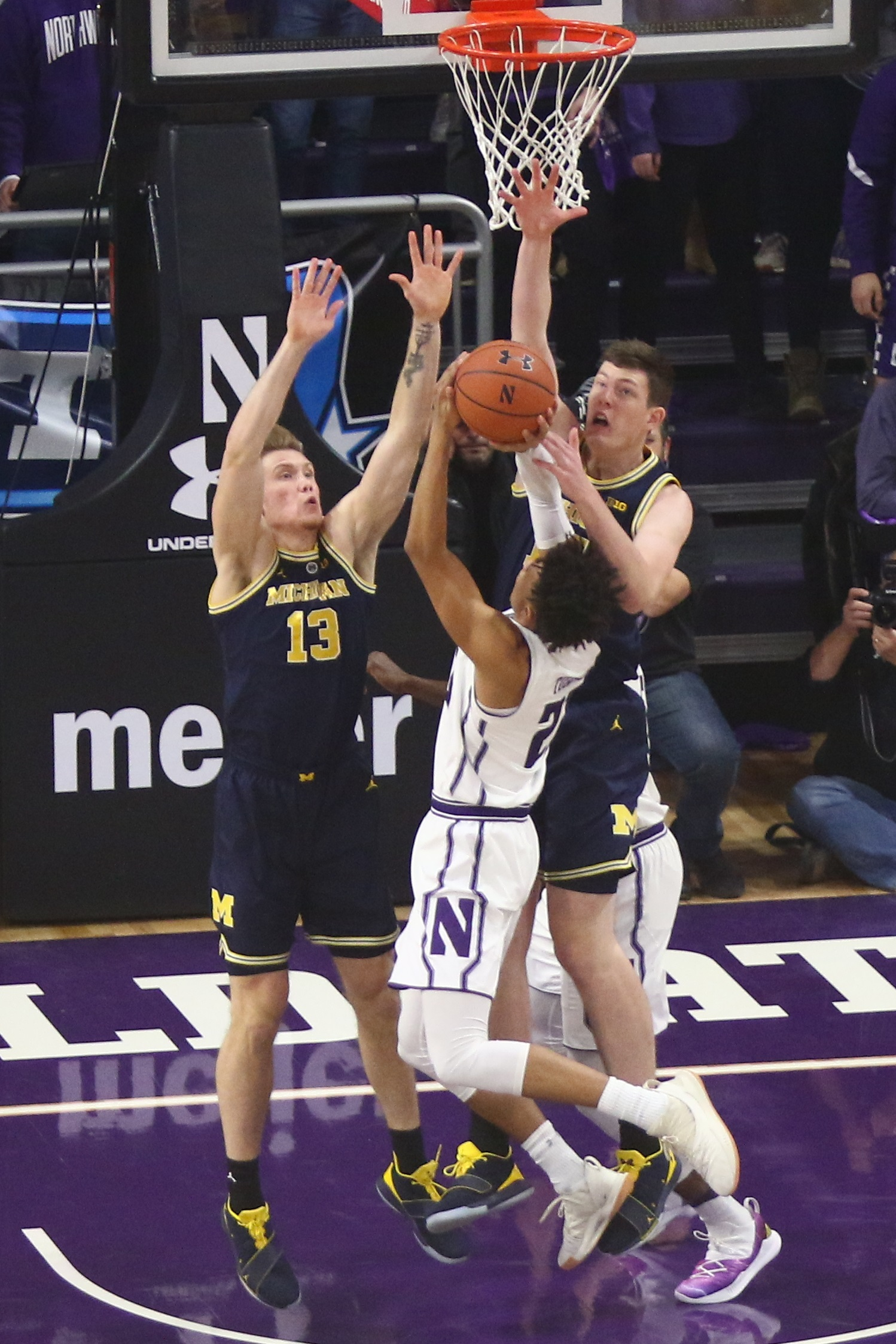
Brazdeikis and Jon Teske on defense against the 2018–19 Northwestern Wildcats

On December 1, Michigan defeated (#19/#18) Purdue 76–57 in its Big Ten Conference season opener. Brazdeikis contributed 12 points. On December 3, he was recognized as Big Ten Freshman of the Week for his performance against these two ranked teams. Following a 23-point game against Northwestern and a 17-point performance against South Carolina, Brazdeikis was recognized as co-Big Ten Freshman of the Week on December 10. On December 30, Michigan defeated Binghamton 74–52. Michigan was led by Brazdeikis with a game-high 21 points. The following day, he earned Big Ten Freshman of the week recognition for the third time in December. On January 3, Michigan returned to Big Ten play with a 68–55 victory over Penn State powered by Brazdeikis' first career double-double (16 points and a career-high 11 rebounds). On January 9, Brazdeikis was one of 7 Big Ten athletes included on the John Wooden Award Men's Midseason Top 25 watchlist. On January 13, the 2018–19 Wolverines team defeated Northwestern to establish a school record for best start at 17–0 and tied the school's record 17-game win streak. On January 19, Michigan lost to Wisconsin 64–54, as Brazdeikis went scoreless. On January 22, Michigan defeated Minnesota 59–57 after a buzzer beater by Matthews. Michigan was led by Brazdeikis with a game-high 18 points and career-tying 11 rebounds, for his second double-double of the season. On January 25, Michigan defeated Indiana 69–46. Michigan was led by Brazdeikis with a game-high 20 points, while Matthews added 10 points and a career-tying 11 rebounds for his sixth career double-double. Michigan jumped out to a 17–0 lead and its defense allowed only 18 points in the first half, as Indiana shot a season-low 27.6% from the field during the game. The 23-point victory marked the largest ever by Michigan on the road against Indiana. On January 28, Brazdeikis earned his fourth Big Ten Freshman of the Week recognition for his performances against Minnesota and Indiana. This surpassed Tim Hardaway Jr. and Nik Stauskas and established a new school record for most such awards. On February 5, Brazdeikis was one of four Big Ten athletes named to the Wooden Award Late Season Top 20 Watch List. That night, he made a career-high five three-pointers and scored a game-high 23 points as Michigan defeated Rutgers 77–65 and head coach John Beilein passed Johnny Orr for the most Big Ten wins as Michigan head coach with 121. On February 7, Brazdeikis was one of two Big Ten athletes (along with Jordan Murphy) named a Karl Malone Award Top 10 finalist.

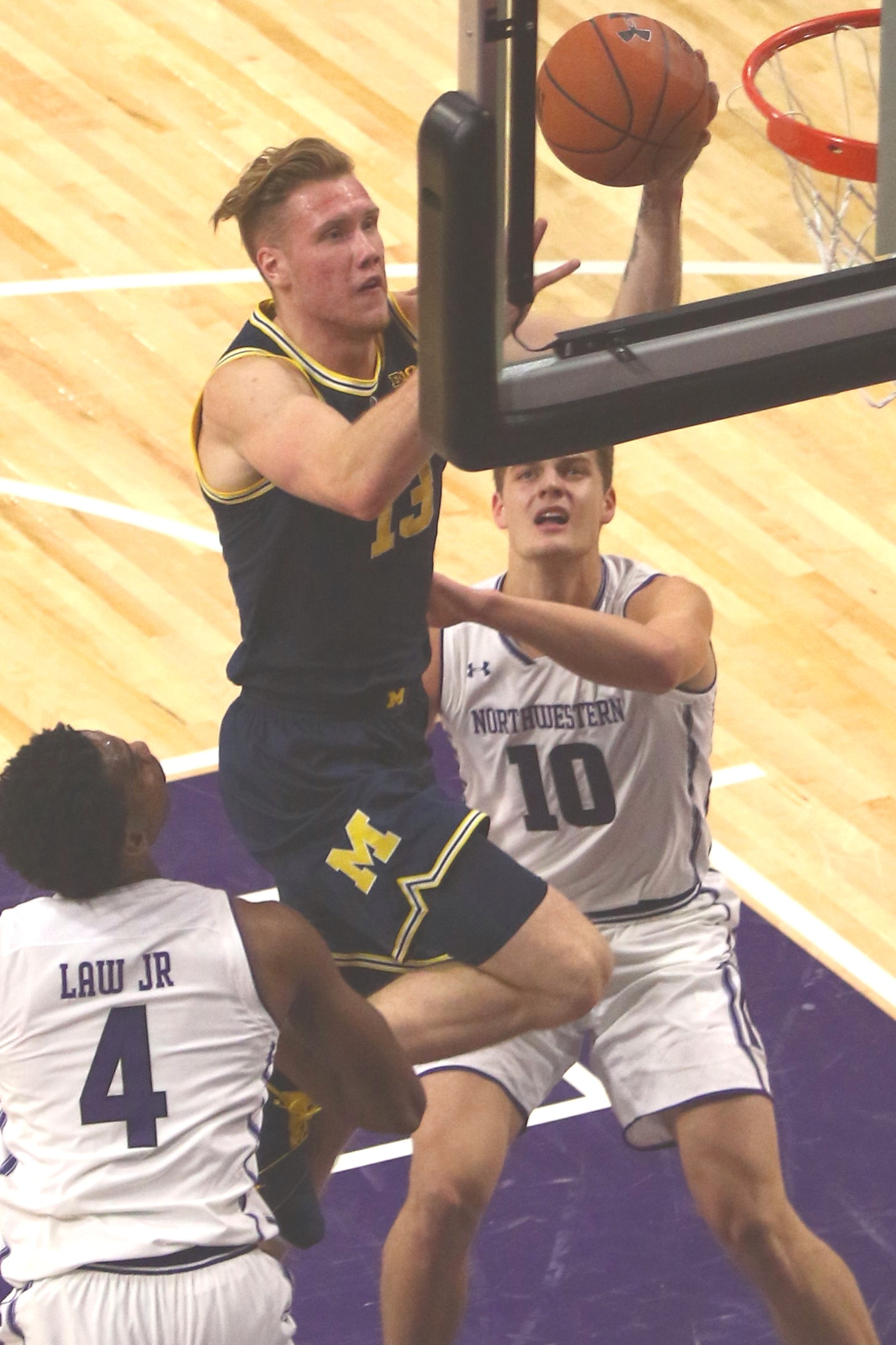
Brazdeikis for the 2018–19 Michigan Wolverines

Following the season, he was a 2019 second-team All-Big Ten selection (coaches and media), the Big Ten Freshman of the Year (coaches and media) and a Big Ten All-Freshman honoree (coaches and media). On March 12, the U.S. Basketball Writers Association named Brazdeikis to its 2018–19 Men's All-District V (OH, IN, IL, MI, MN, WI) Team, based upon voting from its national membership. He was named to the National Association of Basketball Coaches Division I All‐District 7 second team on March 21, as selected and voted on by member coaches of the NABC, making him eligible for the 2019 NABC Coaches' Division I All-America team. He led Michigan in scoring (15.7 points per game) during its run to the March 17 championship game of the 2019 Big Ten Conference men's basketball tournament, earning a spot on the All-tournament team. On March 28, Michigan lost to (#9/#10) Texas Tech 44–63 in the Sweet Sixteen round of the 2019 NCAA tournament. Brazdeikis led Michigan with 17 points and a career-high 13 rebounds, for his third career double-double. The Wolverines finished the season with a 30–7 record, for its second consecutive 30-win season. Brazdeikis was an honorable mention Associated Press 2019 All-American team selection. Following the season, on April 9, Brazdeikis, along with teammates Jordan Poole and Charles Matthews, declared for the 2019 NBA draft with the intention of hiring agents.

== Professional career ==
=== New York Knicks (2019–2021) ===
On June 20, 2019, Brazdeikis was drafted 47th overall in the 2019 NBA draft by the Sacramento Kings, who then traded him to the New York Knicks. He was on the Knicks 2019 NBA Summer League roster. On July 6, 2019, the Knicks signed Brazdeikis to a multi-year contract. Brazdeikis was the first player to post a 30-point game at the 2019 NBA Summer League in Las Vegas. Brazdeikis made his NBA debut on November 3 against the Sacramento Kings scoring four points in a 113–92 loss. He was assigned to the Westchester Knicks for the start of the NBA G League season. On January 11, 2020, Brazdeikis posted 24 points, 14 rebounds and five assists for Westchester in a win over the Lakeland Magic.

On February 1, 2021, Brazdeikis was assigned to the Westchester Knicks.

=== Philadelphia 76ers (2021) ===
On March 25, 2021, Brazdeikis was traded to the Philadelphia 76ers. On April 8, the 76ers waived Brazdeikis who appeared in one game for the team.

=== Orlando Magic (2021–2022) ===
On May 2, 2021, Brazdeikis signed a 10-day contract with the Orlando Magic. Brazdeikis made his debut on May 3, recording a then career-high 14 points in the Magic's 119–112 win over the Detroit Pistons. On May 12, the Magic signed Brazdeikis for the remainder of the 2020–21 season. On May 14, Brazdeikis surpassed his career high in points with 21 in a 122–97 loss to the Philadelphia 76ers. On August 12, 2021, Brazdeikis signed a two-way contract with the Magic. On April 5, 2022, he scored a season-high 20 points, alongside six rebounds and two assists, in a 120–115 win over the Cleveland Cavaliers.

=== Žalgiris (2022–2023) ===
On July 24, 2022, Brazdeikis returned to his homeland and signed a two-year (1+1) contract with Žalgiris of the Lithuanian Basketball League (LKL) and the EuroLeague. He won the LKL in his first season in Lithuania, after being one of the key players in a 3–2 series victory over Rytas, and helped Žalgiris reach the EuroLeague playoffs. Brazdeikis activated the option to play a second season with Žalgiris, but after only one game he was rumored to have been bought out.

=== Olympiacos (2023–2024) ===
On September 24, 2023, Brazdeikis signed a three-year deal with Olympiacos, as Žalgiris had accepted a €500,000 buyout for the player. Brazdeikis lacked playing time with Olympiacos, and while helping Olympiacos win the Greek Super Cup and the Greek Cup, left the team during the summer after Olympiacos lost the Greek League finals to rivals Panathinaikos.

=== Žalgiris (2024–2026) ===
On July 24, 2024, Brazdeikis made his return to Žalgiris, signing a two-year contract.

=== Unicaja (2026–present) ===
On July 14, 2026, Brazdeikis signed a one-year contract with Unicaja of the Liga ACB.

== National team career ==
Brazdeikis earned a silver medal with Canada at the 2015 FIBA Americas Under-16 Championship, averaging 9.2 points and 7.2 rebounds per game. He also played for Canada at the 2016 FIBA Under-17 World Championship, averaging 14.7 points and 6.9 rebounds per game. He was invited to participate in the Nike Hoop Summit on April 13, 2018, and recorded nine points, four rebounds and three assists in 12 minutes of play during the 89–76 World team's victory.

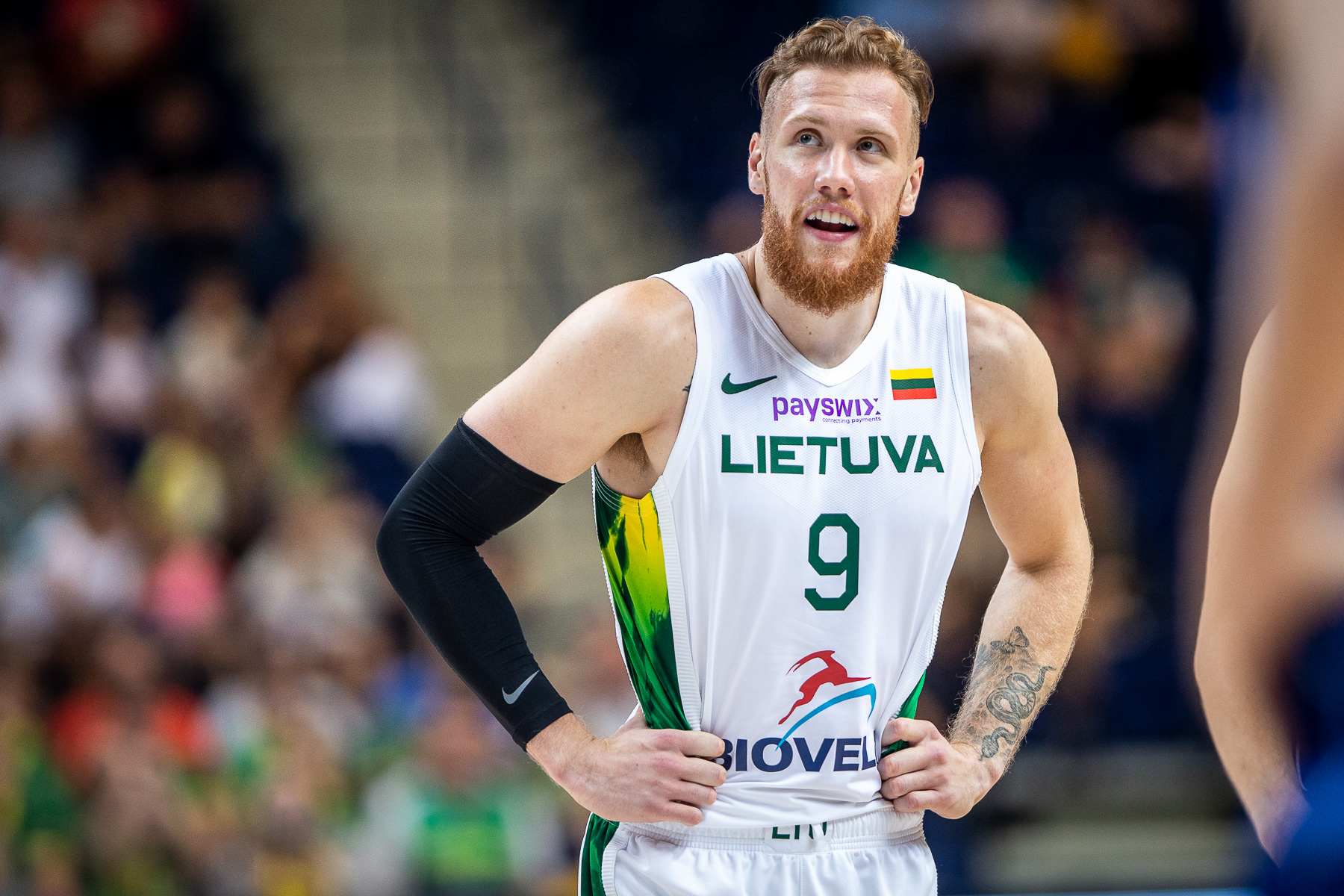
Brazdeikis with Lithuania national team in 2022

Despite playing for Canada's national teams in youth tournaments and not having the Lithuanian citizenship, Brazdeikis stated that he wanted to represent Lithuania national team in international competitions. In January 2020, he officially applied to have his Lithuanian citizenship restored. On May 5, 2021, his Lithuanian citizenship was restored. Due to a change in Lithuanian laws, Brazdeikis also kept his Canadian citizenship. On June 22, 2022, he made his debut with Lithuania in a friendly game against Latvia.

== Career statistics ==
Legend
| GP | Games played | GS | Games started | MPG | Minutes per game |
| FG% | Field-goal percentage | 3P% | 3-point field-goal percentage | FT% | Free-throw percentage |
| RPG | Rebounds per game | APG | Assists per game | SPG | Steals per game |
| BPG | Blocks per game | PPG | Points per game | PIR | Performance index rating |
| **Bold** | Career high |

=== NBA ===
==== Regular season ====
| Year | Team | GP | GS | MPG | FG% | 3P% | FT% | RPG | APG | SPG | BPG | PPG |
|---|---|---|---|---|---|---|---|---|---|---|---|---|
| 2019–20 | New York | 9 | 0 | 5.9 | .273 | .111 | .800 | .6 | .4 | .0 | .1 | 1.9 |
| 2020–21 | New York | 4 | 0 | 1.8 | .000 | — | **1.000** | .5 | .3 | .0 | .0 | .5 |
| 2020–21 | Philadelphia | 1 | 0 | 8.0 | .000 | .000 | — | 2.0 | .0 | .0 | .0 | .0 |
| 2020–21 | Orlando | 8 | 0 | **29.3** | **.443** | **.407** | .667 | **5.1** | **2.0** | **.5** | **.4** | **11.1** |
| 2021–22 | Orlando | **42** | **1** | 12.8 | .431 | .310 | .656 | 1.7 | .9 | .2 | .1 | 5.0 |
| Career | | 64 | 1 | 13.1 | .416 | .315 | .686 | 1.9 | .9 | .2 | .1 | 5.0 |

=== EuroLeague ===
| Year | Team | GP | GS | MPG | FG% | 3P% | FT% | RPG | APG | SPG | BPG | PPG | PIR |
|---|---|---|---|---|---|---|---|---|---|---|---|---|---|
| 2022–23 | Žalgiris | **35** | **28** | **22.4** | **.440** | **.313** | .805 | 2.9 | 1.3 | **.4** | **.1** | **11.6** | **8.8** |
| 2023–24 | Olympiacos | 27 | 5 | 10.9 | .337 | .226 | .741 | 1.7 | .6 | .2 | **.1** | 3.6 | 2.4 |
| 2024–25 | Žalgiris | 29 | 18 | 17.6 | .422 | .240 | **.886** | **3.2** | **1.4** | .3 | **.1** | 8.1 | 7.5 |
| Career | | 91 | 51 | 17.5 | .418 | .273 | .817 | 2.6 | 1.1 | .3 | .1 | 8.1 | 6.5 |

=== College ===
| Year | Team | GP | GS | MPG | FG% | 3P% | FT% | RPG | APG | SPG | BPG | PPG |
|---|---|---|---|---|---|---|---|---|---|---|---|---|
| 2018–19 | Michigan | 37 | 37 | 29.6 | .462 | .392 | .773 | 5.4 | .8 | .7 | .5 | 14.8 |

== Personal life ==
While playing for the Michigan Wolverines he was frequently referred to as Iggy Brazdeikis. The usage of nickname Iggy continued later in his career as well.

In September 2024, Brazdeikis married Canadian Jasmina, who he dated since attending school in Canada. In October 2025, Jasmina gave birth to their firstborn son.
