= Evaldas Kairys =

Lithuanian basketball player (born 1990)

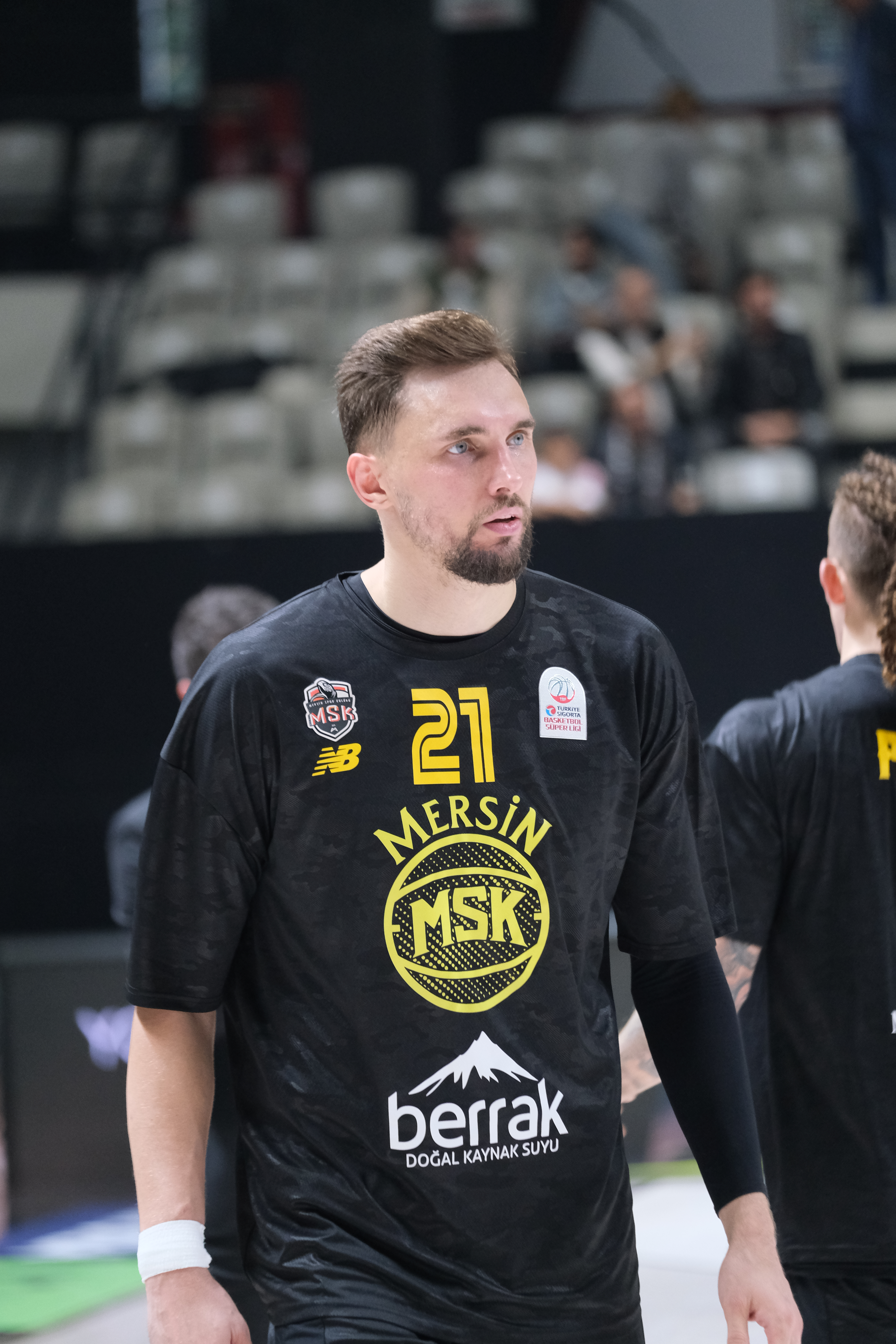
- Kairys with Mersin MSK in 2024

Free Agent
- Position: Center

Personal information
- Born: 11 October 1990 (age 36) Šventoji, Lithuania
- Listed height: 207 cm (6 ft 9 in)
- Listed weight: 105 kg (231 lb)

Career information
- NBA draft: 2012: undrafted
- Playing career: 2006–present

Career history
- 2006–2011: Lietuvos rytas Vilnius
- 2007–2011: →Perlas Vilnius
- 2011–2015: Pieno žvaigždės Pasvalys
- 2015–2017: Muratbey Uşak Sportif
- 2017–2018: Demir İnşaat Büyükçekmece
- 2018–2020: Rytas Vilnius
- 2020–2021: Afyon Belediye
- 2022–2023: Rytas Vilnius
- 2023–2024: Covirán Granada
- 2024–2025: Mersin MSK

Career highlights
- Lithuanian League champion (2022); King Mindaugas Cup winner (2019); Lithuanian League blocks leader (2015)
Medals
Men's basketball
Representing Lithuania
FIBA European U-18 Championship
Silver medal – second place	2008 Greece	U-18 Team

Evaldas Kairys (born 11 October 1990) is a Lithuanian professional basketball player who last played for Mersin MSK of the Basketbol Süper Ligi (BSL). He plays at the center position.

== Professional career ==
Kairys had been a part of Lietuvos rytas Vilnius youth system from 2006 to 2011, when Perlas Vilnius was dissolved. He then joined Pieno žvaigždės Pasvalys for four straight seasons. During his fourth season in Pasvalys, Kairys averaged 10.9 points, 5.9 rebounds in the Lithuanian Basketball League. On 28 July 2015 he signed with Muratbey Uşak Sportif of the premier Turkish Basketball League.

Kairys spent the 2018–19 and 2019–20 seasons with Rytas Vilnius of the Lithuanian Basketball League. He averaged 7.5 points and 3.9 rebounds per game in 2019–20. On 6 August 2020, Kairys signed with Afyon Belediye of the Turkish Basketbol Süper Ligi.

On 25 February 2022, Kairys signed with Rytas Vilnius.

On 30 June 2023, Kairys signed with Covirán Granada of the Liga ACB.

On 23 January 2024, he signed with Mersin MSK of the Türkiye Basketbol Ligi (BSL). On 26 June 2024, he extended his contract with the club, after the promotion to Basketbol Süper Ligi.

== International career ==
Kairys represented the Lithuanian youth squads twice. He won silver medal with the U-18 National Team in 2008 FIBA Europe Under-18 Championship.
