= BC Rasai =

- Leagues: National Basketball League
- Founded: 2005
- History: Rasai (2005-present)
- Arena: „Karpynė“, Raseiniai
- Location: Raseiniai, Lithuania
- Team colors: White, red
- Head coach: (Lithuania) Giedrius Kurtinaitis
Home	Away

BC Rasai is a professional Raseiniai, Lithuania basketball club, currently playing in National Basketball League.

== Roster ==
Note: Flags indicate national team eligibility at FIBA-sanctioned events. Players may hold other non-FIBA nationalities not displayed.

Sūduva-Mantinga roster
Players
Coaches

Pos.	No.	Nat.	Name	Ht.	Wt.	Age
	25	(Lithuania)	Vingelis, Šarūnas
PG	5	(Lithuania)	Aniulis, Evaldas	1.86 m (6 ft 1 in)	78 kg (172 lb)	33 – 24 January 1992

Head coach

- (Lithuania) Giedrius Kurtinaitis

Legend

- (C) Team captain
- Injured

- Roster
Updated: September 5, 2015

== Club achievements ==
- 2014–2015 season: NKL Round of 16

== Notable players and coaches ==
- (Lithuania) Giedrius Kurtinaitis
- (Lithuania) Karolis Guščikas
