= Jamel Morris =

American basketball player (born 1992)

Fortitudo Bologna
- Position: Shooting guard
- League: Serie A2

Personal information
- Born: November 14, 1992 (age 34)
- Listed height: 6 ft 4 in (1.93 m)
- Listed weight: 201 lb (91 kg)

Career information
- High school: Lincoln (Gahanna, Ohio)
- College: Glenville State (2011–2013); Fairmont State (2014–2016)
- NBA draft: 2016: undrafted
- Playing career: 2016–present

Career history
- 2016–2017: Cestistica Civitavecchia
- 2017–2018: Grand Rapids Drive
- 2018–2020: Split
- 2020–2021: Legia Warszawa
- 2021: Orléans Loiret Basket
- 2021–2022: Mitteldeutscher BC
- 2022–2023: Lietkabelis Panevėžys
- 2023–2024: New Basket Brindisi
- 2024–2025: Élan Chalon
- 2025–2026: Lietkabelis Panevėžys
- 2026–present: Fortitudo Bologna

Jamel Vaughn Morris (born November 14, 1992) is an American professional basketball player for Fortitudo Bologna of the Serie A2. He played college basketball for Fairmont State University.

== College career ==
=== Glenville State (2011–2013) ===
Morris averaged 16 points per game as a freshman (401 total points) and was an All-Freshman Team selection. He averaged 20 points per game as a sophomore (560 total points) and was named to the all-conference team.

=== Fairmont State (2013–2016) ===
Morris was a two years starter after sitting out one year to redshirt. He led the team to two NCAA tournaments and made the third-most three-point field goals in a single season at Fairmont State (92). Ranked #2 in the country for 10 weeks and ranked top 5 for 16 straight weeks, finished the year as #8 at NABC poll. He was an All-Conference selection and set MEC record for threes in a game (11) along with season-high 37 points.

== Professional career ==
=== Cestistica Civitavecchia (2016–2017) ===
After his college career, Morris signed with Ste Mar. 90 Cestistica Civitavecchia (Serie C-Gold) in Italy. He averaged 23 points per game, 8 rebounds per game, 4 assists per game and 1.2 steals per game. He earned MVP of the week twice.

=== Grand Rapids Drive (2017–2018) ===
On November 1, 2017, Morris was named to the opening night roster for the Grand Rapids Drive, the affiliate to the Detroit Pistons in the NBA G League. In 50 games played, Morris averaged 25 minutes per game, 13 points per game and 2 assists per game while shooting 42% from the field and 40% from three. His team was the Central Division Runner-up and clinched a playoff berth for the first time in their history.

In the summer of 2018, Morris played for the Detroit Pistons in the NBA Summer League in Las Vegas, Nevada.

=== Split (2018–2020) ===
On August 15, 2018, Morris signed for Croatian team Split. He left the team in January 2019. On September 7, 2019, he re-signed with Split. During his time in Split in 2018–19 he averaged 15 points per game in Croatian League competition and 13 points per game in ABA League competition while shooting 51% from the field and 52% from three. In the 2019–20 season, he averaged 10 points and 4 assists while shooting 42% from the field and 42% from three in 19 minutes per game, helping lead the team to the second spot in the standings and the final four playoff spot for first time.

=== Legia Warszawa (2020–2021) ===
On July 24, 2020, Morris signed with Legia Warszawa of the Polish Basketball League.

=== Orléans Loiret Basket (2021) ===
On April 4, 2021, Morris signed with Orléans Loiret Basket of the LNB Pro A.

=== Mitteldeutscher BC (2021–2022) ===
On July 19, 2021, Morris signed with Brose Bamberg of the Basketball Bundesliga (BBL). However, the team opted to replace him with a point guard during the preseason. On September 11, Morris signed with Mitteldeutscher BC.

=== Lietkabelis Panevėžys (2022–2023) ===
On July 10, 2022, Morris signed with Lietkabelis Panevėžys of the Lithuanian Basketball League and the EuroCup.

=== New Basket Brindisi (2023–2024) ===
On July 3, Morris signed a two-year deal with New Basket Brindisi of the Italian Lega Basket Serie A.

=== Élan Chalon (2024–2025) ===
On July 2, 2024, he signed with Élan Chalon of the LNB Pro A.

=== Lietkabelis Panevėžys (2025–2026) ===
On July 4, 2025, Morris signed one–year deal with Lietkabelis Panevėžys of the Lithuanian Basketball League (LKL) and the EuroCup.

== Career statistics ==
Legend
GP	Games played	GS	Games started	MPG	Minutes per game
FG%	Field-goal percentage	3P%	3-point field-goal percentage	FT%	Free-throw percentage
RPG	Rebounds per game	APG	Assists per game	SPG	Steals per game
BPG	Blocks per game	PPG	Points per game	PIR	Performance index rating
**Bold**	Career high

=== EuroCup ===
Year	Team	GP	GS	MPG	FG%	3P%	FT%	RPG	APG	SPG	BPG	PPG	PIR
2022–23	Lietkabelis Panevėžys	**19**	**11**	**26.7**	**.393**	.377	**.852**	**1.8**	**2.4**	**.7**	**.1**	**15.1**	**9.1**
2025–26	Lietkabelis Panevėžys	16	7	25.9	.385	**.392**	.773	1.6	2.0	.4	.0	13.5	6.4
Career		35	18	26.4	.390	.384	.819	1.7	2.2	.6	.0	14.3	7.8
