= BC Trakai =

KK Trakai
- Leagues: RKL
- Founded: 2011
- History: Tony Resort-Altitudė (2011-2012); TonyResort (2012-2013); Trakai (2013-2015); TonyResort (2016-present)
- Arena: Trakų LOSC salė, Trakai
- Location: Trakai, Lithuania
- Team colors: White, Green
- Website: http://www.kktrakai.lt/
Home	Away

KK Trakai are a professional basketball club based in Trakai, Lithuania. The club currently competes in the A division of the Regional Basketball League. In 2015 the club dissolved after failing to resolve criteria given to them by the league. In 2016 they joined the B division of the Regional Basketball League and were finalists. In 2017 they moved up to the A division of the Regional Basketball League.

== Club achievements ==
- 2011–2012 season: RKL A 2nd place
- 2012–2013 season: RKL A 1st place
- 2013–2014 season: NKL 2nd place
- 2014–2015 season: NKL quarterfinals
- 2016–2017 season: RKL B 2nd place

== Notable players and coaches ==
- (Lithuania) Andrius Šležas
- (Lithuania) Julius Kazakauskas
- (Lithuania) Renatas Kurilionokas
