= Duodenal cancer =

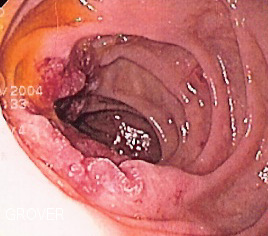
- Endoscopic image of adenocarcinoma of duodenum seen in the post-bulbar duodenum
- Specialty: Gastroenterology, general surgery, oncology
- Symptoms: vomiting blood, blood in the stool

Duodenal cancer is a cancer in the first section of the small intestine known as the duodenum. Cancer of the duodenum is relatively rare compared to stomach cancer and colorectal cancer. Its histology is usually adenocarcinoma.

Familial adenomatous polyposis (FAP), Gardner syndrome, Lynch syndrome, Muir–Torre syndrome, celiac disease, Peutz–Jeghers syndrome, Crohn's disease and juvenile polyposis syndrome are risk factors for developing this cancer.

The duodenum is the first part of the small intestine. It is located between the stomach and the jejunum. After foods combine with stomach acid, they descend into the duodenum where they mix with bile from the gallbladder and digestive fluid from the pancreas.

== Signs and symptoms ==
The cancerous mass tends to block food from getting to the small intestine. If food cannot get to the intestines, it will cause pain, acid reflux, and weight loss because the food cannot get to where it is supposed to be processed and absorbed by the body.

Patients with duodenal cancer may experience abdominal pain, weight loss, nausea, vomiting, and chronic gastrointestinal bleeding.

== Treatment ==
Resection is sometimes a part of a treatment plan, but duodenal cancer is difficult to remove surgically because of the area that it resides in—there are many blood vessels supplying the lower body. Chemotherapy is sometimes used to try to shrink the cancerous mass. Other times intestinal bypass surgery is tried to reroute the stomach to intestine connection around the blockage.

A 'Whipple' procedure is a type of surgery that is sometimes possible with this cancer. In this procedure, the duodenum, a portion of the Pancreas (the head), and the gall bladder are usually removed, the small intestine is brought up to the Pylorus (the valve at the bottom of the stomach) and the liver and pancreatic digestive enzymes and bile are connected to the small intestine below the pylorus.

The removal of part of the Pancreas often requires taking pancreatic enzyme supplements to aid digestion. These are available in the form of capsules by prescription.
