= Regional Basketball League (Lithuania) =

RKL (Regional Basketball League)
- Founded: 2005; 21 years ago
- First season: 2005–06
- Country: Lithuania
- Confederation: FIBA Europe
- Number of teams: 56 (2026-27)
- Level on pyramid: 3
- Promotion to: NKL
- Website: rkl.lt

The Regional Basketball League (RKL) (Lithuanian: Regioninė krepšinio lyga), also known as Nostra.lt-RKL for sponsorship reasons, is the third-tier men's league in the Lithuanian basketball pyramid. The RKL engages in promotion and relegation with the second-tier National Basketball League (NKL).

== History ==
The RKL started play in 2005 after the now-defunct second division LKAL (Lithuanian Basketball A League) was abolished and functionally split up into two new leagues: the new second-tier NKL, its direct successor, and the lower-tier RKL. Today, the league includes independent clubs and reserve squads of major Lithuanian clubs.

== Competition ==
The RKL has an A division and B division that use promotion and relegation between themselves. For the 2026-27 season, the A division will have 18 clubs and the B division will have a league record 38 clubs. In the A division, every team faces each other twice in the regular season, once home and once away, before the season ends with a 12-team playoff for the RKL championship. The top four regular season finishers automatically make the quarterfinals while teams 5-12 play an extra qualifying series.

In the B division, teams go through a draw process into groups of 9-10 teams each, from which they compete for qualification for either the "Big Cup" or "Small Cup" playoff depending on their finish within their group. In 2027-28, the format will be changed; 16 Big Cup teams will form "B1" and 16 Small Cup teams will form "B2", and if more than 16 teams play in the Small Cup, the ones below 16th place drop out of the RKL entirely. As the B division is currently thought of as the unofficial "fourth tier" of Lithuanian basketball, the creation of B2 will create a similar unofficial "fifth tier".

== Teams ==
=== A division ===
There are 18 teams competing in the RKL's A division in 2026-27.

2026-27 RKL A Division
Team	Arena	City
Akmenes Patriotas	Akmenė District Sports Centre	Naujoji Akmenė
BC Druskininkai	Druskininkai Sports Centre	Druskininkai
BC Sendvaris	Sendvaris "Saulė" School multifunctional centre	Sendvaris
Birstono Milasta	Birštonas Sports and Wellness Centre	Birštonas
Delikatesas Joniskis	Joniškis "Saulė" Basic School sports hall	Joniškis
Kazlu Rudos SC Ataka-Danilus	Kazlų Rūda Sports Centre	Kazlų Rūda
KK Kupiskis	L. Stuoka-Gucevičius Gymnasium sports hall	Kupiškis
KK Trakai-Traku SC	Trakai Sports Centre	Trakai
Klaipedos LCC Tarptautinis Universitetas	LCC Michelsen Center	Klaipėda
Prienu Tikodenta	Prienai Arena	Prienai
Raseiniu Raseiniai	Karpynė	Raseiniai district/Gabšiai
Rinkuskiu alus BirzuBirzai-KKSC	Biržai "Saulė" Gymnasium sports hall	Biržai
Silales Lusis	Šilalė Sports School	Šilalė
Sirvintos UHB Group	Širvintos Sports Centre	Širvintos
Vilniaus rajono KK	Skaidiškės sports complex	Vilnius district/Skaidiškės
Vilniaus Rytas-MRU	Active Vilnius Arena	Vilnius
Vytauto Didziojo Universitetas	President Valdas Adamkus Sports Centre	Akademija
Zalgiris Kaunas-3	Žalgiris Youth Training Centre	Kaunas

=== B division ===
There are 38 teams competing in the RKL's B division in 2026-27, drawn into four groups.

2026-27 RKL B Division
Group A	Group B	Group C	Group D
LKSK "Gijos Klinikos"	VDU-2	Šiaulių KA "Saulė-ŠSG"	Klaipėdos universitetas-KKM
Utenos "Dauniškio prekyba-Juventus"	Ukmergės SC-"Jusema"	Klaipėdos VKKM-"Neptūnas"	KA "Žalgiris-Nordclinic"
Jonavos sporto centras	Lazdijų "Briedis-Pietų Megrame"	Pakruojo SC-"Lygumų ŽŪB"	Skuodo KKSC-"Kuršasta"
Kaišiadorių "Savingė"	Anykščių KKSC-"Elmis"	Kauno kolegija	Kauno technologijos universitetas
Prienų sporto centras	Kauno r. "Tornado-Tauras"	BC Radviliškis	Panevėžio sporto centras
Vilniaus krepšinio mokykla	Vilkaviškio NKA "Perlas-GO"	LSU	Šilutės "Šilutė"
Vilniaus rajono sporto centras	Varėnos KRS	Tauragė-2	Telšių SRC
Vilniaus KA "Sanit"	Sostinės krepšinio mokykla	Kelmės krepšinis	BC Domeikava
Rokiškio JVN	Kėdainių sporto centras	Palangos sporto centras	Pajūrio "Jūra"
Švenčionėlių "Rida"	Baltic Sharks		

== League champions ==
- 2005–06 season: BC Mažeikiai
- 2006–07 season: BC Juventus
- 2007–08 season: Šiaulių ABRO-Saulė
- 2008–09 season: BC Radviliškis
- 2009–10 season: BC Ežerūnas-Karys
- 2010–11 season: BC Ežerūnas-Karys
- 2011–12 season: BC Olimpas Plungė
- 2012–13 season: BC Trakai
- 2013–14 season: BC Rasai
- 2014–15 season: BC Telšiai
- 2015–16 season: KTU
- 2016–17 season: BC Tauragė
- 2017–18 season: BC Gargždai-SC
- 2018–19 season: BC Lūšis
- 2019–20 season: KK Perlas Vilkaviškis
- 2020–21 season: BC Kretinga
- 2021–22 season: BC Rivile
- 2022–23 season: BC Jurbarkas-Karys
- 2023–24 season: KK Olimpas
- 2024-25 season: Kėdainių Sporto Centras
- 2025-26 season: Birštono Milasta
