= BC Jonava =

Basketball team in Jonava, Lithuania

Jonava Hipocredit
- Leagues: LKL; ENBL
- Founded: 1969; 57 years ago
- History: List: Statyba (1969–1980) Klevas (1980–1994) Statyba (1994–1999) Statyba–Žalgiris (1999–2001) Triobet (2001–2006) SK Dextera (2006–2008) SK Malsta (2008–2009) Triobet–Malsta (2009–2010) Triobet (2010–2013) Petrochema (2013–2015) Petrochema-Dextera (2015–2016) Jonavos sporto klubas (2016–2017) Jonava (2017–2018) Sintek-Jonava (2018–2019) Jonava (2019–2020) CBet (2020–2025) Jonava Hipocredit (2025–present)
- Arena: Jonava Sports Arena
- Capacity: 2,200
- Location: Jonava, Lithuania
- Team colors: Blue, cyan, white
- President: Vaidas Vaškevičius
- Head coach: Steponas Babrauskas
- Championships: 1 NKL
- Website: bcjonava.lt

BC Jonava also known as Jonava Hipocredit due to sponsorship reasons, is a Lithuanian professional basketball club based in Jonava. The team competes in the Lithuanian Basketball League (LKL) and in the European North Basketball League (ENBL).

The club was officially founded in 1999, and had been playing in the second-tier Lithuanian basketball league NKL (formerly known as LKAL) since its inception. Having been promoted to the top division, the club played a strong first season in the LKL, finishing fifth.

== History ==
The first basketball club in Jonava known as "Statyba" was founded in 1969. In 1980, a furniture enterprise started sponsoring the team. BC Jonava won the Lithuanian second-tier league basketball championship at the end of the season. A decade later, the historic Jonava basketball club ceased to exist, and was replaced by the sports club "Triobet" in 1999.

Old Jonava logo

== Players ==
=== Current roster ===
Jonava Hipocredit roster
Players
Coaches

Pos.	No.	Nat.	Name	Ht.	Wt.	Age
G	0	(United States)	Johnson, Nick	1.87 m (6 ft 2 in)	92 kg (203 lb)	25 – 26 March 2001
PG	1	(United States)	Mesidor, Reggie	1.82 m (6 ft 0 in)	77 kg (170 lb)	25 – 6 April 2001
G/F	3	(Lithuania)	Sabeckis, Donatas (C)	1.98 m (6 ft 6 in)	95 kg (209 lb)	33 – 30 December 1992
PG	4	(Lithuania)	Raulusevičius, Nojus	1.78 m (5 ft 10 in)	65 kg (143 lb)	18 – 25 September 2008
F/C	7	(Lithuania)	Valantinas, Lukas	2.05 m (6 ft 9 in)	102 kg (225 lb)	25 – 25 February 2001
C	8	(Belgium)	Lambrecht, Tim	2.07 m (6 ft 9 in)	103 kg (227 lb)	28 – 15 January 1998
G/F	10	(United States)	Harrison, Damoni	1.96 m (6 ft 5 in)	81 kg (179 lb)	22 – 10 March 2004
F	11	(Lithuania)	Repšys, Matas	2.06 m (6 ft 9 in)	94 kg (207 lb)	24 – 28 January 2002
G/F	12	(Lithuania)	Mockus, Mintautas	2.01 m (6 ft 7 in)	85 kg (187 lb)	23 – 14 September 2003
F/C	13	(United States)	Brown, Clevon	2.03 m (6 ft 8 in)	105 kg (231 lb)	28 – 18 July 1998
F/C	18	(Lithuania)	Vasiliauskas, Grantas	2.04 m (6 ft 8 in)	105 kg (231 lb)	27 – 10 January 1999
G/F	24	(Lithuania)	Kulieša, Nojus	1.90 m (6 ft 3 in)	82 kg (181 lb)	21 – 13 February 2005
F	55	(Lithuania)	Arlauskas, Martynas	2.01 m (6 ft 7 in)	93 kg (205 lb)	26 – 10 July 2000

Head coach

- (Lithuania) Steponas Babrauskas

Assistant coach(es)

- (Lithuania) Artūras Milaknis
- (Lithuania) Kajus Lapienis

Athletic trainer(s)

- (Lithuania) Aivaras Pranckevičius

Physiotherapist(s)

- (Lithuania) Gabrielė Čeponytė

Legend

- (C) Team captain
- Injured

- Roster
Updated: September 19, 2026

=== Depth chart ===
Pos.	Starting 5	Bench 1	Bench 2
C	Tim Lambrecht	Lukas Valantinas
PF	Clevon Brown	Matas Repšys	Grantas Vasiliauskas
SF	Martynas Arlauskas	Damoni Harrison	Mintautas Mockus
SG	Nick Johnson	Nojus Kulieša
PG	Donatas Sabeckis	Reggie Mesidor	Nojus Raulusevičius

=== In ===
No.	Pos.	Nat.	Name	Moving from	
0	G/F	(United States)	Nick Johnson	Sluneta Ústí nad Labem	(Czech Republic)
1	PG	(United States)	Reggie Mesidor	Den Helder Suns	(Netherlands)
3	G/F	(Lithuania)	Donatas Sabeckis	Golden Eagle Ylli	(Kosovo)
4	G	(Lithuania)	Nojus Rauluševičius	Jonava SC	(Lithuania)
7	F/C	(Lithuania)	Lukas Valantinas	Nevėžis Kėdainiai	(Lithuania)
8	F/C	(Belgium)	Tim Lambrecht	Czarni Słupsk	(Poland)
10	G/F	(United States)	Damoni Harrison	Charlotte	(United States)
12	G/F	(Lithuania)	Mintautas Mockus	Juventus Utena	(Lithuania)
13	F/C	(United States)	Clevon Brown	Opava	(Czech Republic)
18	PF	(Lithuania)	Grantas Vasiliauskas	Shinagawa City	(Japan)
24	SG	(Lithuania)	Nojus Kulieša	Lietkabelis Panevėžys	(Lithuania)
55	G/F	(Lithuania)	Martynas Arlauskas	CSM Galați	(Romania)

=== Out ===
No.	Pos.	Nat.	Name	Moving to	
0	G/F	(United States)	Lesley Varner II	MZT Skopje	(North Macedonia)
2	G	(United States)	Makai Ashton-Langford	Dziki Warsaw	(Poland)
3	G/F	(Lithuania)	Modestas Babraitis	Utah Valley Wolverines	(United States)
8	G/F	(Lithuania)	Lukas Kreišmontas	Neptūnas Klaipėda	(Lithuania)
9	G/F	(Lithuania)	Dovydas Buika	BYU	(United States)
12	F/C	(Estonia)	Mihkel Kirves	Pärnu	(Estonia)
13	PG	(Lithuania)	Adomas Sidarevičius	BC Gargždai	(Lithuania)
23	F/C	(Canada)	Benjamin Krikke	BC Gargždai	(Lithuania)
33	G	(United States)	Olin Carter III	Free agent	
42	C	(United States)	Tommy Rutherford	Free agent	
98	F	(Lithuania)	Džiugas Slavinskas	Free agent	

== Season by season ==
Season	Tier	League	Pos.	King Mindaugas Cup	European Competitions	
2001–02	2	LKAL	10th			
2002–03	2	LKAL	8th			
2003–04	2	LKAL	3rd			
2004–05	2	LKAL	2nd			
2005–06	2	NKL	4th			
2006–07	2	NKL	2nd			
2007–08	2	NKL	3rd			
2008–09	2	NKL	9th			
2009–10	2	NKL	2nd			
2010–11	2	NKL	9th			
2011–12	2	NKL	8th			
2012–13	2	NKL	4th			
2013–14	2	NKL	5th			
2014–15	2	NKL	7th			
2015–16	2	NKL	4th			
2016–17	2	NKL	14th			
2017–18	2	NKL	9th			
2018–19	2	NKL	12th			
2019–20	2	NKL	–^{1}			
2020–21	2	NKL	1st	First round		
2021–22	1	LKL	5th	Quarterfinalist		
2022–23	1	LKL	4th	Second place	4 FIBA Europe Cup	QR
2023–24	1	LKL	7th	Quarterfinalist	4 FIBA Europe Cup	R2
2024–25	1	LKL	4th	Quarterfinals		
2025–26	1	LKL	8th	Quarterfinals		

^1 Cancelled due to the COVID-19 pandemic in Europe.

== Notable players ==
- (Lithuania) Lukas Brazdauskis
- (Lithuania) Romanas Brazdauskis
- (Lithuania) Ramūnas Butautas
- (Lithuania) Vidas Ginevičius
- (Lithuania) Rimantas Grigas
- (Lithuania) Tomas Masiulis
- (Lithuania) Darius Maskoliūnas
- (Lithuania) Darius Sirtautas
- (Lithuania) Arvydas Šikšnius
- (Lithuania) Edgaras Ulanovas
- (Lithuania) Arūnas Visockas
- (Lithuania) Edvinas Šeškus
- (Lithuania) Laimonas Kisielius
- (Lithuania) Vytautas Šulskis
- (Lithuania) Artūras Valeika
- (Lithuania) Dovis Bičkauskis
- (Lithuania) Aurimas Majauskas
- (Latvia) Martins Laksa
- (Belgium) Manu Lecomte
- (Serbia) Goran Huskić
- (Serbia) Strahinja Micovic
- (United States) Glynn Watson Jr.
- (United States) Stanley Whittaker

== Head coaches ==
- (Lithuania) Kęstutis Naruševičius: 2009–2016
- (Lithuania) Nerijus Zabarauskas: 2016–2018, 2019–2020
- (Turkey) Murat Didin: 2018
- (Lithuania) Rimantas Grigas: 2018–2019
- (Lithuania) Virginijus Šeškus: 2020–2024
- (Lithuania) Mantas Šernius: 2024–2025
- (Lithuania) Paulius Juodis: 2025
- (Lithuania) Steponas Babrauskas: 2025–present
