= BC Radviliškis =

- Leagues: National Basketball League
- Arena: Radviliškis Sports Hall (Capacity: 500)
- Location: Radviliškis, Lithuania
- Team colors: White, Orange and Blue
- President: (Lithuania) Juozapas Glinskis
- Head coach: (Lithuania) Algis Pipiras
- Championships: RKL Champions (2005)
Home	Away

BC Radviliškis is a professional Radviliškis, Lithuania basketball club klubas, currently playing in National Basketball League. In 2009 BC Radviliškis became RKL champions and got permission to participate in NKL.

During fourth transition game RKL champion BC Radviliškis with result 102:58 crushed NKL outsider Alytus Alytaus-Alramstos basketball team and won serie with result 3:1, because of that BC Radviliškis was automatically transferred to second-tier Lithuania basketball league NKL.

== Club achievements ==
- 2003-2004 season: LKBL 1st
- 2004-2005 season: LKBL 8th
- 2005-2006 season: RKL ?th
- 2006-2007 season: RKL ?th
- 2007-2008 season: RKL 4th
- 2008-2009 season: RKL 1st
- 2009-2010 season: NKL 11th

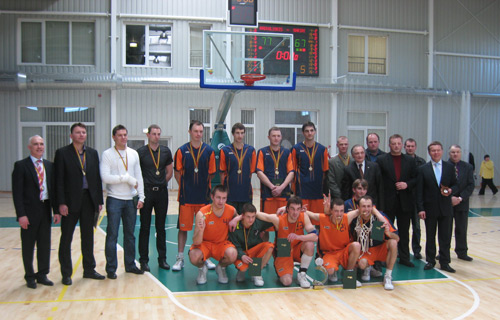
BC Radviliškis became RKL Champions

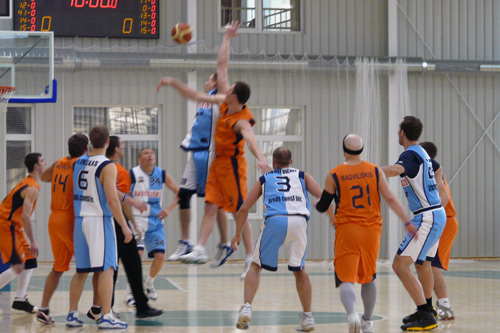
BC Radviliškis against Chicago Radviliškis

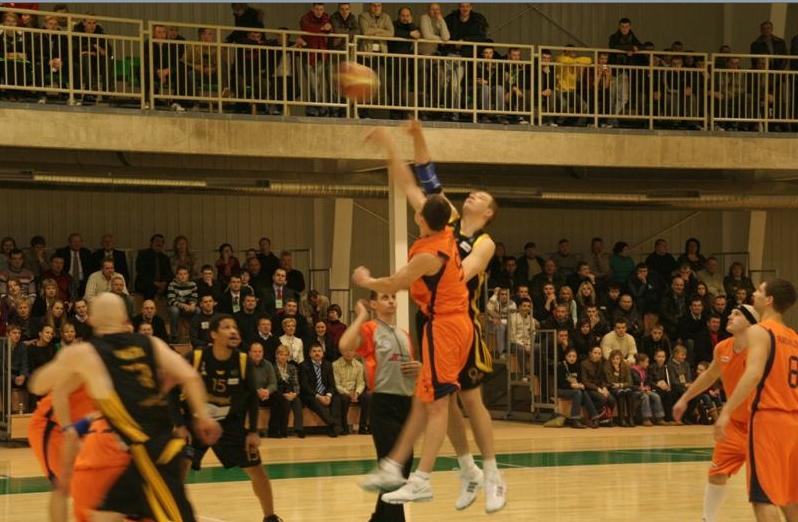
BC Radviliškis against Šiauliai

== Team roster ==
=== 2009-2010 season ===
Name	Height	Position	Date of birth
(Lithuania) Rimvydas Dėmenius	194 cm	Small forward	April 7, 1984
(Lithuania) Andrius Vasiliauskas	185 cm	Shooting guard	October 4, 1982
(Lithuania) Dainius Nariusevicius	202 cm	Small forward	June 12, 1977
(Lithuania) Dovis Bickauskis	188 cm	Point guard	September 5, 1993
(Lithuania) Juozas Blažys	197 cm	Shooting guard	August 6, 1983
(Lithuania) Mantas Pukinskas	198 cm	Small forward	May 3, 1989
(Lithuania) Rytis Grigaitis	198 cm	Shooting guard	November 11, 1984
(Lithuania) Rytis Rauktys	187 cm	Point guard	February 3, 1984
(Lithuania) Lukas Pipiras	192 cm	Shooting guard	May 31, 1989
(Lithuania) Laimonas Kutra	185 cm	Point guard	January 27, 1988
(Latvia) Karlis Gubats	202 cm	Center	June 13, 1985
(Nigeria) Azeez Oladimeji	204 cm	Center	July 18, 1989
(Lithuania) Žilvinas Kuklierius	180 cm	Point guard	May 22, 1985
(Lithuania) Audrius Mineikis	201 cm	Small forward	July 18, 1977

- Head Coach: (Lithuania) Algis Pipiras
