= Eurocup Basketball 2010–11 Regular Season Group C =

Standings and results for Group C of the regular season phase of the 2010–11 Eurocup basketball tournament.

== Standings ==
Key to colors
Top two places in each group advance to Last 16
Eliminated

	Team	Pld	W	L	PF	PA	Diff
1.	(Spain) Gran Canaria 2014	6	5	1	463	396	+67
2.	(Ukraine) BC Budivelnyk	6	4	2	397	391	+6
3.	(Montenegro) KK Budućnost	6	3	3	431	418	+13
4.	(Lithuania) BC Šiauliai	6	0	6	420	506	−86

Source: Euroleague Basketball

== Fixtures and results ==
All times given below are in Central European Time.

=== Game 1 ===
16 November 2010
18:15

Report

BC Šiauliai (Lithuania)	76–97	(Montenegro) KK Budućnost
Scoring by quarter: 16–22, 18–21, 21–32, 21–22
Pts: Harris 15; Rebs: Žukauskas 3 Asts: Janavičius, Weaver 4		Pts: Simonović 23; Rebs: Šćekić 11; Asts: Nešović 4

Šiauliai Arena
Attendance: 3,450
Referees: Robert Lottermoser (GER), Lahdo Sharro (SWE), Sergiy Chebyshev (UKR)

16 November 2010
21:30

Report

Gran Canaria 2014 (Spain)	58–62	(Ukraine) BC Budivelnyk
Scoring by quarter: 11–20, 11–10, 19–13, 17–19
Pts: Savané 13; Rebs: Wallace 6 Asts: Wallace 3		Pts: Keys 20; Rebs: Wilson 7 Asts: Wilson 3

Centro Insular de Deportes
Attendance: 3,400
Referees: Elias Koromilas (GRE), Carmelo Lo Guzzo (ITA), Sergio Silva (POR)

=== Game 2 ===
23 November 2010
19:00

Report

KK Budućnost (Montenegro)	66–90	(Spain) Gran Canaria 2014
Scoring by quarter: 28–30, 13–18, 8–25, 17–17
Pts: Dragičević 25; Rebs: Šćekić, Dragičević 4 Asts: Šćekić 2		Pts: Wallace, Carroll 14; Rebs: Moran 7 Asts: Green 6

Morača Sports Center
Attendance: 1,500
Referees: Sradan Dozai (CRO), Nicola Maestre (FRA), Ioannis Foufis (GRE)

23 November 2010
19:00

Report

BC Budivelnyk (Ukraine)	74–66	(Lithuania) BC Šiauliai
Scoring by quarter: 21–15, 23–13, 17–20, 13–18
Pts: Wilson 20; Rebs: Wilson 12; Asts: Zabirchenko 4		Pts: Harris 21; Rebs: Šarakauskas 13; Asts: Harris, Weaver 3

Kyiv Sports Palace
Attendance: 3,420
Referees: Recep Ankarali (TUR), Oscars Lucis (LAT), Alfred Jovović (CRO)

=== Game 3 ===
30 November 2010
19:00

Report

BC Budivelnyk (Ukraine)	70–56	(Montenegro) KK Budućnost
Scoring by quarter: 21–16, 19–11, 14–17, 16–12
Pts: Morley 25; Rebs: three players 5 Asts: Keys 4		Pts: Dragičević 14; Rebs: Simonović 9 Asts: three players 2

Kyiv Sports Palace
Attendance: 3,340
Referees: Petar Obradovic (BIH), Carmelo Paternico (ITA), Rustu Nuran (TUR)

30 November 2010
21:30

Report

Gran Canaria 2014 (Spain)	92–72	(Lithuania) BC Šiauliai
Scoring by quarter: 26–16, 26–19, 27–20, 13–17
Pts: Wallace 23; Rebs: Wallace 9 Asts: Green 8		Pts: Weaver 15; Rebs: Žygimantas 8 Asts: Gvezdauskas 5

Centro Insular de Deportes
Attendance: 3,123
Referees: Gianluca Mattioli (ITA), Oscar Lefwerth (SWE), Moritz Reiter (GER)

=== Game 4 ===
7 December 2010
18:15

Report

BC Šiauliai (Lithuania)	70–89	(Spain) Gran Canaria 2014
Scoring by quarter: 23–9, 8–19, 21–29, 18–32
Pts: Žukauskas 20; Rebs: Žukauskas, Šarakauskas 6 Asts: Žukauskas 5		Pts: Carroll 17; Rebs: Nelson, Beiran 6 Asts: Green 5

Šiauliai Arena
Attendance: 2,350
Referees: Fabio Facchini (ITA), Lahdo Sharro (SWE), Joseph Bissang (FRA)

7 December 2010
19:00

Report

KK Budućnost (Montenegro)	69–54	(Ukraine) BC Budivelnyk
Scoring by quarter: 22–12, 23–17, 12–10, 12–15
Pts: Simonović 14; Rebs: Simonović 6 Asts: five players 2		Pts: Betts 19; Rebs: Betts 8 Asts: Keys 4

Morača Sports Center
Attendance: 750
Referees: Andrej Jersan (SLO), Gianluca Mattioli (ITA), Panagiotis Anastopoulos (GRE)

=== Game 5 ===
14 December 2010
19:00

Report

BC Budivelnyk (Ukraine)	66–72	(Spain) Gran Canaria 2014
Scoring by quarter: 17–16, 18–24, 17–19, 14–13
Pts: Betts 16; Rebs: Betts 8 Asts: Keys 5		Pts: Carroll 17; Rebs: Nelson 7 Asts: Beiran 3

Kyiv Sports Palace
Attendance: 3,540
Referees: Andrej Lovsyn (SLO), Sergey Mikhavlov (RUS), Enrico Sabetta (ITA)

14 December 2010
19:00

Report

KK Budućnost (Montenegro)	83–66	(Lithuania) BC Šiauliai
Scoring by quarter: 20–8, 25–22, 17–21, 21–15
Pts: Dragičević 24; Rebs: three players 5 Asts: Otašević 4		Pts: Weaver 16; Rebs: Matulionis 4 Asts: Janavičius 7

Morača Sports Center
Attendance: 950
Referees: Roberto Chiari (ITA), Roman Kolar (SLO), Carmelo Lo Guzzo (ITA)

=== Game 6 ===
21 December 2010
20:00

Report

BC Šiauliai (Lithuania)	70–71	(Ukraine) BC Budivelnyk
Scoring by quarter: 16–16, 13–24, 22–17, 19–14
Pts: Weaver 14; Rebs: Gumenyuk, Šarakauskas 9 Asts: Žukauskas 3		Pts: Zabirchenko 18; Rebs: Morley 10; Asts: Morley 4

Šiauliai Arena
Attendance: 650
Referees: Robert Vyklicky (CZE), Sergey Mikhaylov (RUS), Tomas Trawicki (POL)

4 January 2011
19:00

Report

Gran Canaria 2014 (Spain)	62–60	(Montenegro) KK Budućnost
Scoring by quarter: 16–17, 22–9, 13–19, 11–15
Pts: Carroll 21; Rebs: Nelson, Wallace 6 Asts: Nelson, Carroll 3		Pts: Dubljević 12; Rebs: Simonović, Dubljević 9 Asts: Otašević 3

Centro Insular de Deportes
Attendance: 2,879
Referees: Luigi Lamonica (ITA), Oliver Krause (GER), Sergio Silva (POR)
