= 2011 LKL All-Star Game =

Time Team	Lietuviai
114	122
	1	2	3	4	Total
Time Team	23	35	31	25	114
Lietuviai	36	31	26	29	122
- Date: March 12, 2010
- Venue: Šiauliai Arena, Šiauliai
- MVP: Jonas Valančiūnas

The 2011 LKL All-Star Game was held on March 12, 2011, in Šiauliai Arena. Time Team, composed of foreign players, played against Lietuviai, which was composed of Lithuanian players.

== Rosters ==
Lietuviai
Pos.	Player	Team	Total Votes
Starters
PG	(Lithuania) Mantas Kalnietis	Žalgiris	6,979
SG	(Lithuania) Martynas Pocius	Žalgiris	8,494
SF	(Lithuania) Simas Jasaitis	Lietuvos Rytas	3,243
PF	(Lithuania) Paulius Jankūnas	Žalgiris	8,795
C	(Lithuania) Jonas Valančiūnas	Lietuvos Rytas	11,545
Reserves
SF	(Lithuania) Aurimas Kieža	Juventus	
PF	(Lithuania) Vaidotas Volkus	Techasas	
SF	(Lithuania) Dainius Šalenga*	Žalgiris	
SG	(Lithuania) Martynas Gecevičius	Lietuvos Rytas	
SG	(Lithuania) Arvydas Šikšnius	Perlas	
PG	(Lithuania) Adas Juškevičius	Rūdupis	
PF	(Lithuania) Vytautas Šarakauskas	Šiauliai	

- Dainius Šalenga was replaced by Mindaugas Kuzminskas, because of the termination of his contract with Žalgiris.

Time Team
Pos.	Player	Team	Total Votes
Starters
PG	(United States) Khalid El-Amin*	Lietuvos Rytas	6,582
SG	(United States) Marcus Brown	Žalgiris	8,637
SF	(Australia) Brad Newley	Lietuvos Rytas	4,483
PF	(United States) Travis Watson	Žalgiris	9,816
C	(Serbia) Milko Bjelica	Lietuvos Rytas	4,165
Reserves
PF	(Bosnia and Herzegovina) Kenan Bajramović	Lietuvos Rytas	
SF	(Latvia) Ernests Kalve	Nevėžis	
SG	(United States) D. J. Strawberry	Lietuvos Rytas	
PG	(United States) Chris Lowe	Naglis-Adarkis	
PG	(United States) DeJuan Collins	Žalgiris	
C	(United States) David Weaver	Šiauliai	
C	(Serbia) Boban Marjanović	Žalgiris	

- Khalid El-Amin was replaced by Rashaun Broadus, due to a serious leg injury.

== Coaches ==
Antanas Sireika, of Šiauliai, was chosen as the head coach of Team Lietuviai, while Aleksandar Trifunović, of Lietuvos Rytas, was chosen as the head coach of the Time Team.
