= Paulius Danusevičius =

Lithuanian basketball player (born 2001)

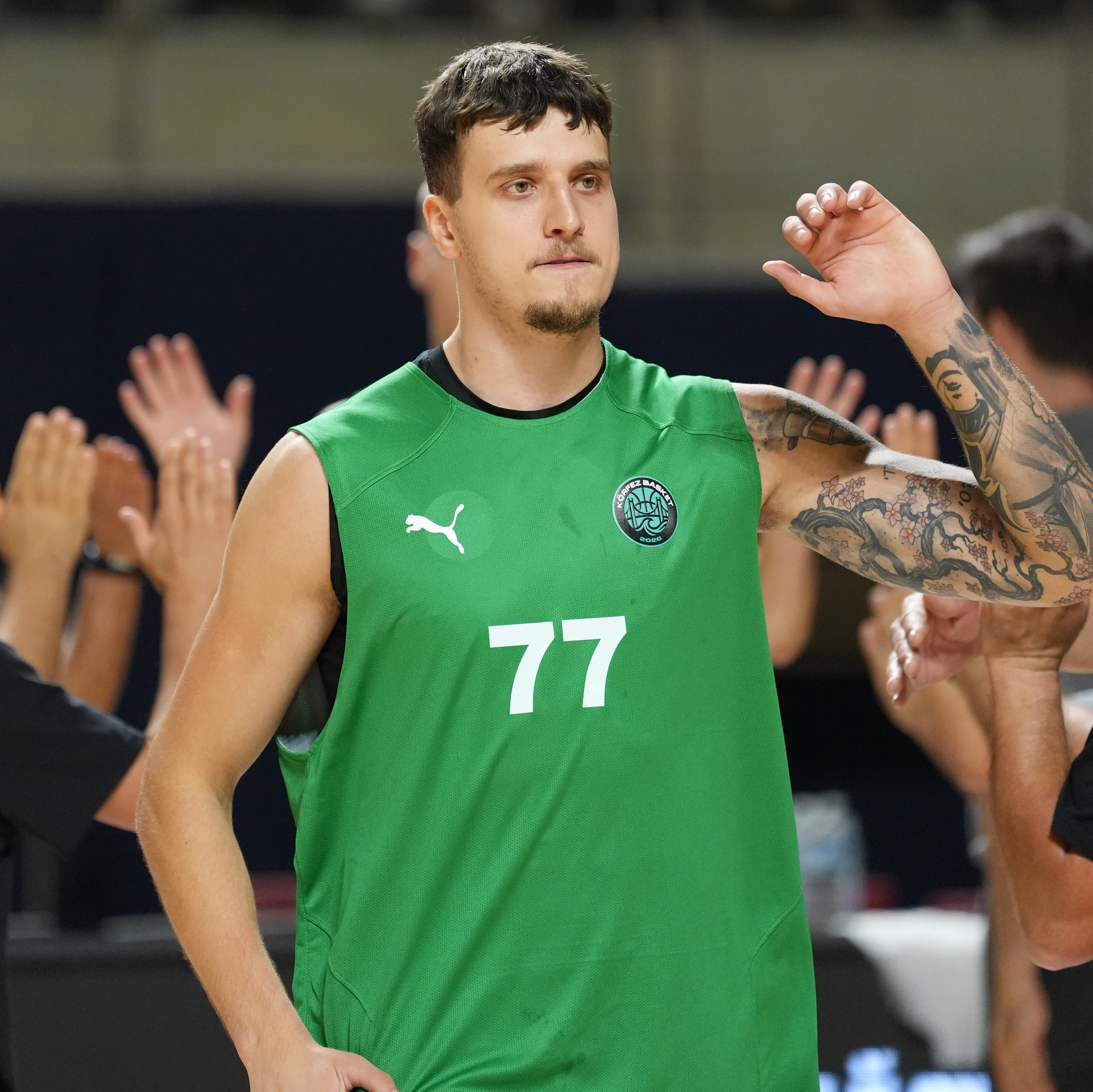
- Danusevičius with Körfez Basket in 2026

No. 77 – Biotekno Körfez Basket
- Position: Power forward
- League: BSL

Personal information
- Born: 8 May 2001 (age 25) Šiauliai, Lithuania
- Listed height: 2.06 m (6 ft 9 in)
- Listed weight: 105 kg (231 lb)

Career information
- NBA draft: 2023: undrafted
- Playing career: 2018–present

Career history
- 2018–2020: Delikatesas
- 2020–2024: Šiauliai
- 2020–2021: → Perlas Vilkaviškis
- 2024: Kolossos Rodou
- 2024–2026: Lietkabelis Panevėžys
- 2026–present: Körfez Basket

Paulius Danusevičius (born 8 May 2001) is a Lithuanian professional basketball player for Körfez Basket of the Basketbol Süper Ligi (BSL).

== Professional career ==
Danusevičius started his career with Delikatesas, playing in the Lithuanian second-tier. After two seasons, he moved to Šiauliai of the LKL. He spent his first year on loan with Perlas Vilkaviškis in the second division.

On 29 June 2024, he moved from Lithuania for the first time, signing with Kolossos Rodou of the Greek Basketball League. On 18 December of the same year, he parted ways with the Greek club. The following day, he signed with Lietkabelis Panevėžys for the remainder of the season.

On June 18, 2026, he signed with Körfez Basket of the Basketbol Süper Ligi (BSL).

== National team ==
Danusevičius made his debut for the Lithuania men's national basketball team on June 10, 2024, in a friendly match against Lebanon.

== Career statistics ==
Legend
GP	Games played	GS	Games started	MPG	Minutes per game
FG%	Field-goal percentage	3P%	3-point field-goal percentage	FT%	Free-throw percentage
RPG	Rebounds per game	APG	Assists per game	SPG	Steals per game
BPG	Blocks per game	PPG	Points per game	PIR	Performance index rating
**Bold**	Career high

=== EuroCup ===
Year	Team	GP	GS	MPG	FG%	3P%	FT%	RPG	APG	SPG	BPG	PPG	PIR
2024–25	Lietkabelis Panevėžys	6	6	26.0	.419	.214	.500	5.0	1.2	**.3**	**1.0**	7.2	7.3
2025–26	Lietkabelis Panevėžys	**18**	**14**	**26.5**	**.493**	**.293**	**.565**	**6.3**	**1.9**	.2	.7	**10.3**	**11.9**
Career		24	20	26.4	.477	.273	.556	6.0	1.8	.2	.8	9.5	10.8
