= Aistis Pilauskas =

Lithuanian basketball player (born 1998)

Nevėžis Kėdainiai
- Title: Assistant coach
- League: LKL

Personal information
- Born: 8 April 1998 (age 28) Vilnius, Lithuania
- Listed height: 1.88 m (6 ft 2 in)
- Listed weight: 80 kg (176 lb)

Career information
- Playing career: 2015–2024
- Position: Point guard
- Coaching career: 2024–present

Career history

Playing
- 2015–2019: Lietuvos rytas Vilnius
- 2015–2016: → Perlas-MRU Vilnius
- 2019–2020: BC Šiauliai
- 2019–2020: → BC Delikatesas
- 2020-2021: BC Telšiai
- 2021-2022: BC Rivilė Vilnius
- 2023-2024: BC Stekas Vilnius-Ukmergė

Coaching
- 2024–2025: Rytas Vilnius (assistant)
- 2024–2026: BC Rytas-2 (assistant)
- 2026–present: Nevėžis Kėdainiai (assistant)

Career highlights
- King Mindaugas Cup winner (2019)
Medals
Men's basketball
Representing Lithuania
FIBA European U-18 Championship
| Bronze medal – third place | 2015 Greece | U18 National Team |

Aistis Pilauskas (born 8 April 1998) is a Lithuanian professional basketball coach and former player. He is currently an assistant coach for Nevėžis Kėdainiai of the Lithuanian Basketball League (LKL).

== Professional career ==
On 16 September 2015, Aistis Pilauskas signed a contract with Lietuvos rytas and started to play for Lietuvos rytas development team Perlas-MRU Vilnius in the NKL. In first season in Perlas-MRU Vilnius, he averaged 6.5 points per game and 2.1 assist per game. On 13 April 2016, he made a debut against Vytautas Prienai–Birštonas by scoring 5 points.

== National team career ==
Pilauskas made his debut for the junior national team of Lithuania in the 2015 FIBA Europe Under-18 Championship in Greece. He averaged 5.3 points, 2.1 assist in 16.5 minutes of action. His team won bronze medals.
