= Karolis Lukošiūnas =

Lithuanian basketball player (born 1997)

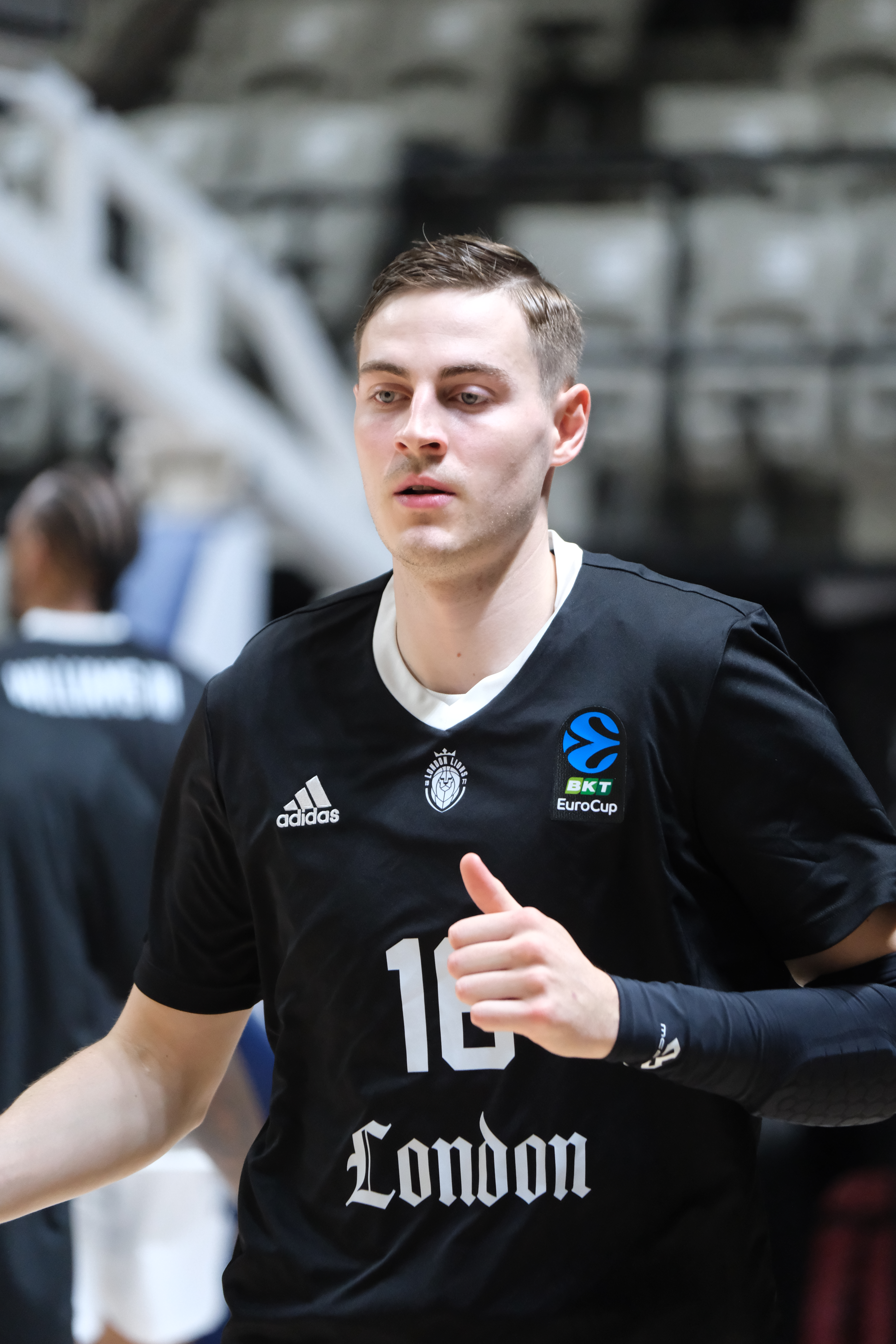
- Lukošiūnas with the London Lions in 2025

No. 16 – Šiauliai
- Position: Shooting guard / small forward
- League: LKL; EuroCup

Personal information
- Born: 4 August 1997 (age 29) Vilnius, Lithuania
- Listed height: 1.95 m (6 ft 5 in)
- Listed weight: 90 kg (198 lb)

Career information
- NBA draft: 2019: undrafted
- Playing career: 2017–present

Career history
- 2017–2018: Ežerūnas Molėtai
- 2018–2019: Šiauliai
- 2018: →Delikatesas Joniškis
- 2019–2023: Žalgiris Kaunas
- 2023: Salt Lake City Stars
- 2024: Žalgiris Kaunas
- 2024–2025: Juventus Utena
- 2025–2026: London Lions
- 2026–: Šiauliai

Career highlights
- 3× Lithuanian League champion (2020, 2021, 2023); 5× King Mindaugas Cup winner (2020–2024)

Karolis Lukošiūnas (born 4 August 1997) is a Lithuanian professional basketball player for Šiauliai of the Lithuanian Basketball League (LKL) and the EuroCup.

== Professional career ==
Lukošiūnas started his professional career signing with Ežerūnas Molėtai. After impressive 2017–18 season with Ežerūnas, Lukošiūnas was invited to BC Šiauliai.

On 30 October 2023, Lukošiūnas joined the Salt Lake City Stars after being selected in the first round of the 2023 NBA G League draft. However, he was waived on 28 December.

On 3 July 2024, Lukošiūnas signed a one-year contract with Juventus Utena of the Lithuanian Basketball League (LKL).

On 22 September 2025, Lukošiūnas signed a two–month contract with London Lions of the Super League Basketball (SLB) and the EuroCup.

On 21 July 2026, Lukošiūnas signed with Šiauliai of the Lithuanian Basketball League (LKL) and the EuroCup.

== Career statistics ==
Legend
GP	Games played	GS	Games started	MPG	Minutes per game
FG%	Field-goal percentage	3P%	3-point field-goal percentage	FT%	Free-throw percentage
RPG	Rebounds per game	APG	Assists per game	SPG	Steals per game
BPG	Blocks per game	PPG	Points per game	PIR	Performance index rating
**Bold**	Career high

=== EuroLeague ===
Year	Team	GP	GS	MPG	FG%	3P%	FT%	RPG	APG	SPG	BPG	PPG	PIR
2019–20	Žalgiris	6	0	2.7	.167	.200	—	**1.0**	.5	—	—	0.5	0.8
2020–21	Žalgiris	16	1	5.7	**.414**	**.407**	**.500**	.3	.2	.1	**.1**	2.3	0.8
2021–22	Žalgiris	20	**10**	11.7	.333	.333	**.500**	.9	**.6**	**.3**	**.1**	3.6	**1.6**
2022–23	Žalgiris	**22**	0	6.8	.389	.364	—	.4	.3	.2	—	1.8	0.5
2023–24	Žalgiris	1	0	**12.0**	.333	.333	—	—	—	—	—	**6.0**	-2.0
Career		65	11	7.7	.356	.350	.500	.5	.4	.2	.0	2.4	.9
