= Rokas =

- Gender: Male
- Language: Lithuanian
- Name day: 16 August

Origin
- Region of origin: Lithuania

Rokas is a Lithuanian masculine given name. Notable people with the name include.

- Rokas Čepanonis (born 1986), Lithuanian basketball player
- Rokas Giedraitis (born 1992), Lithuanian basketball player
- Rokas Guščinas (born 1991), Lithuanian artistic gymnast
- Rokas Jokubaitis (born 2000), Lithuanian basketball player
- Rokas Kostiuškevičius (born 1990), Lithuanian balloonist
- Rokas Masiulis (born 1969), Lithuanian politician
- Rokas Milevičius (born 1986), Lithuanian yacht sport sailor
- Rokas Zaveckas (born 1996), Lithuanian alpine skier
- Rokas Žilinskas (1972–2017), Lithuanian journalist and politician
- Rokas Zubovas (born 1966), Lithuanian pianist

As a surname:

- Efstathios Rokas (born 1984), Greek footballer
