= Steward School =

The Steward School
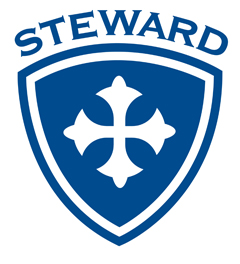

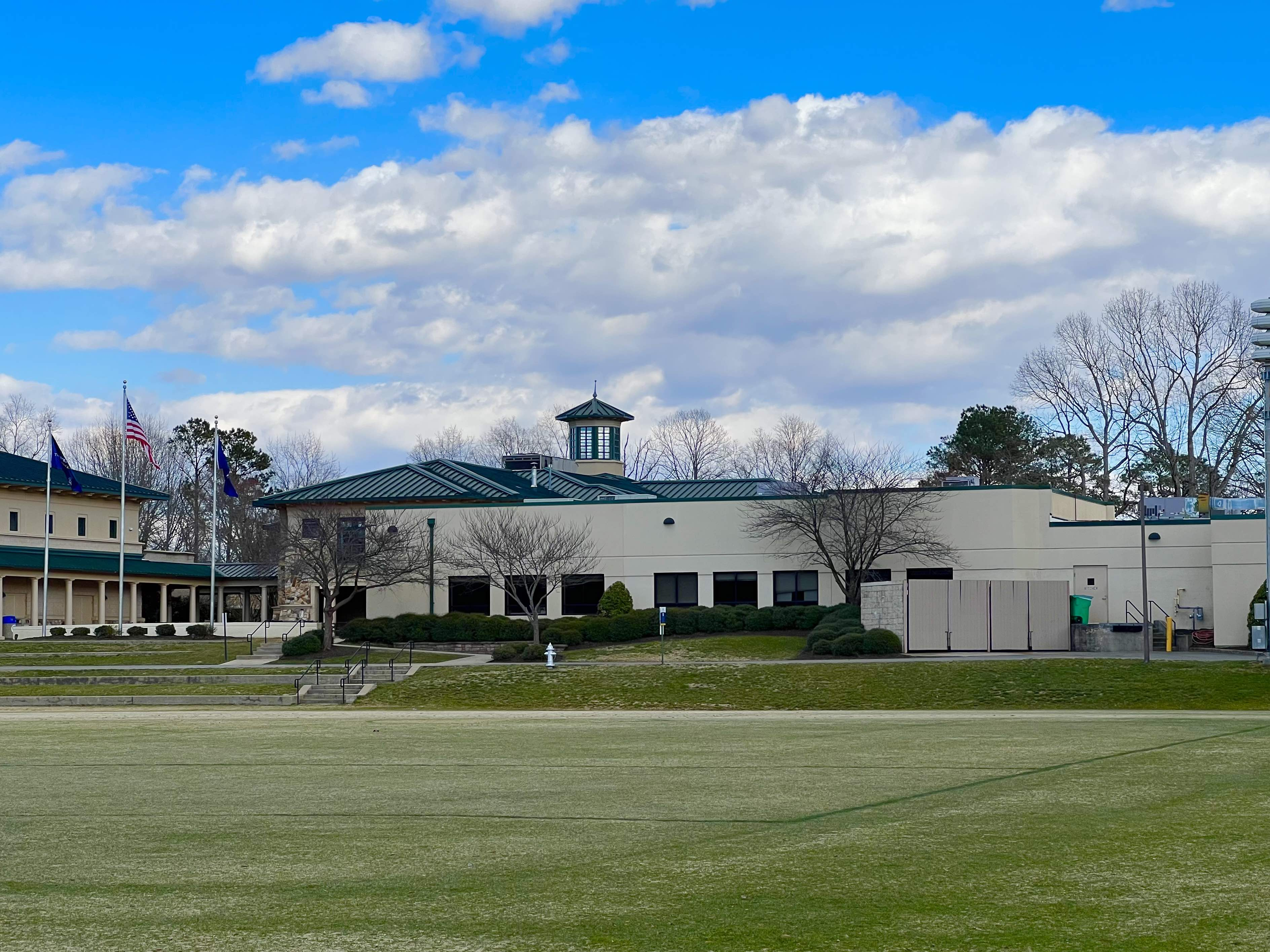

Location
- 11600 Gayton Road; Henrico, Virginia 23233; United States; 37°36′44″N 77°37′21″W

Information
- Type: Private day school
- Founded: 1972
- Founder: Helen Dixon
- Head of school: Dan Frank
- Teaching staff: 93
- Grades: PK-12
- Gender: Co-educational
- Enrollment: 710 (2026-27)
- Student to teacher ratio: 8:1
- Campus size: 37 acres
- Campus type: Suburban
- Colors: Blue and Gold
- Mascot: Sparty and Spartina
- Nickname: Spartans
- Website: www.stewardschool.org

The Steward School is a private day school located in the suburbs of Richmond, Virginia, United States.

== Campus ==
Located in western Henrico County on 37 acres (150,000 m^{2}), the Steward School has six academic buildings, an athletic center, four athletic fields, a baseball field, and eight tennis courts.

== Athletics ==
The Steward School participates in: soccer, basketball, baseball, volleyball, tennis, lacrosse, cross country, golf, field hockey, swim and dive, and cheerleading. All of the teams compete in the Tidewater Conference for independent schools and the Virginia Independent Schools Athletic Association.

Since 2017, the Steward School has won 11 state championships, 151 athletes have received VISAA DII first or second team all state recognition, and 63 athletes were collegiate signees.

== Notable alumni ==
- Efton Reid (2020), basketball player
