= Efton Reid =

American basketball player (born 2002)

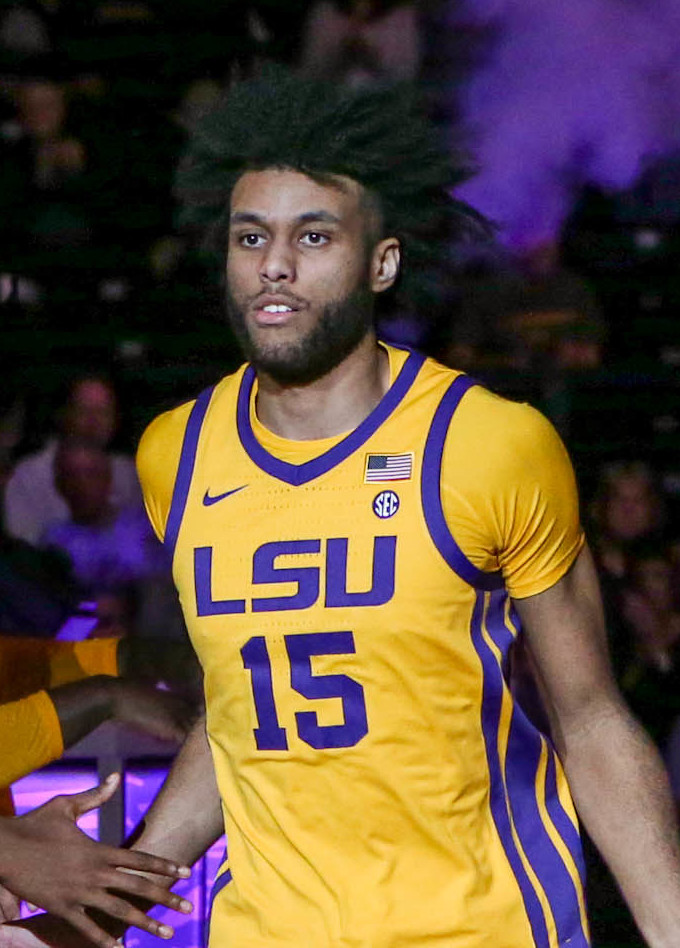
- Reid with LSU in 2021

No. 15 – Šiauliai
- Position: Center
- League: LKL; EuroCup

Personal information
- Born: February 3, 2002 (age 24) Richmond, Virginia, U.S.
- Listed height: 7 ft 0 in (2.13 m)
- Listed weight: 240 lb (109 kg)

Career information
- High school: Steward School (Richmond, Virginia); IMG Academy (Bradenton, Florida)
- College: LSU (2021–2022); Gonzaga (2022–2023); Wake Forest (2023–2025)
- Playing career: 2025–present

Career history
- 2025–2026: Kobrat
- 2026: Stal Ostrów Wielkopolski
- 2026–present: Šiauliai

Efton J. Reid III (born February 3, 2002) is an American professional basketball player for Šiauliai of the Lithuanian Basketball League (LKL) and the EuroCup. He played college basketball for the LSU Tigers, Gonzaga Bulldogs, and Wake Forest Demon Deacons.

== High school career ==
Reid played basketball for Steward School in Richmond, Virginia, where he emerged as a top college prospect by his sophomore season. As a junior, he averaged 19 points, 12 rebounds and two blocks per game, shooting 74.6 percent from the field, and earned First Team VISAA Division II All-State honors. For his senior season, he transferred to IMG Academy in Bradenton, Florida, joining the postgraduate team. Reid averaged 16 points and 11 rebounds as a senior. He was named to the Jordan Brand Classic roster.

=== Recruiting ===
Reid was considered a five-star recruit by ESPN and Rivals, and a four-star recruit by 247Sports. On May 9, 2021, he committed to playing college basketball for LSU over offers from Florida State, Ohio State and Pittsburgh.

College recruiting
Name	Hometown	School	Height	Weight	Commit date
Efton Reid; C	Richmond, VA	IMG Academy (FL)	6 ft 11 in (2.11 m)	240 lb (110 kg)	May 9, 2021
Efton Reid; C	Recruit ratings: Rivals: 247Sports: ESPN: (91)				
Overall recruit ranking: Rivals: 28 247Sports: 31 ESPN: 20
Note: In many cases, Scout, Rivals, 247Sports, On3, and ESPN may conflict in their listings of height and weight.; In these cases, the average was taken. ESPN grades are on a 100-point scale.; Sources: "LSU 2021 Basketball Commitments". Rivals.; "2021 LSU Tigers Recruiting Class". ESPN.; "2021 Team Ranking". Rivals.

== College career ==
Reid averaged 6.3 points and 4.3 rebounds per game as a freshman. After coach Will Wade was fired, he transferred to Gonzaga. As a sophomore, Reid averaged 2.1 points and 1.0 rebounds per game. Following the season, he transferred to Wake Forest.

== Professional career ==
=== Kobrat (2025–2026) ===
On August 18, 2025, Reid signed with Kobrat of the Korisliiga.

=== Stal Ostrów Wielkopolski (2026) ===
On February 25, 2026, he signed with Stal Ostrów Wielkopolski of the Polish Basketball League (PLK).

=== Šiauliai (2026–present) ===
On August 6, 2026, Reid signed with Šiauliai of the Lithuanian Basketball League (LKL) and the EuroCup.

== Career statistics ==
Legend
GP	Games played	GS	Games started	MPG	Minutes per game
FG%	Field goal percentage	3P%	3-point field goal percentage	FT%	Free throw percentage
RPG	Rebounds per game	APG	Assists per game	SPG	Steals per game
BPG	Blocks per game	PPG	Points per game	**Bold**	Career high

=== College ===
Year	Team	GP	GS	MPG	FG%	3P%	FT%	RPG	APG	SPG	BPG	PPG
2021–22	LSU	34	34	19.6	.519	.250	.483	4.3	.5	.5	.8	6.3
2022–23	Gonzaga	25	0	4.7	.622	.00	.538	1.0	.1	.1	.1	2.1
