= Robertas Giedraitis =

Lithuanian basketball player and coach

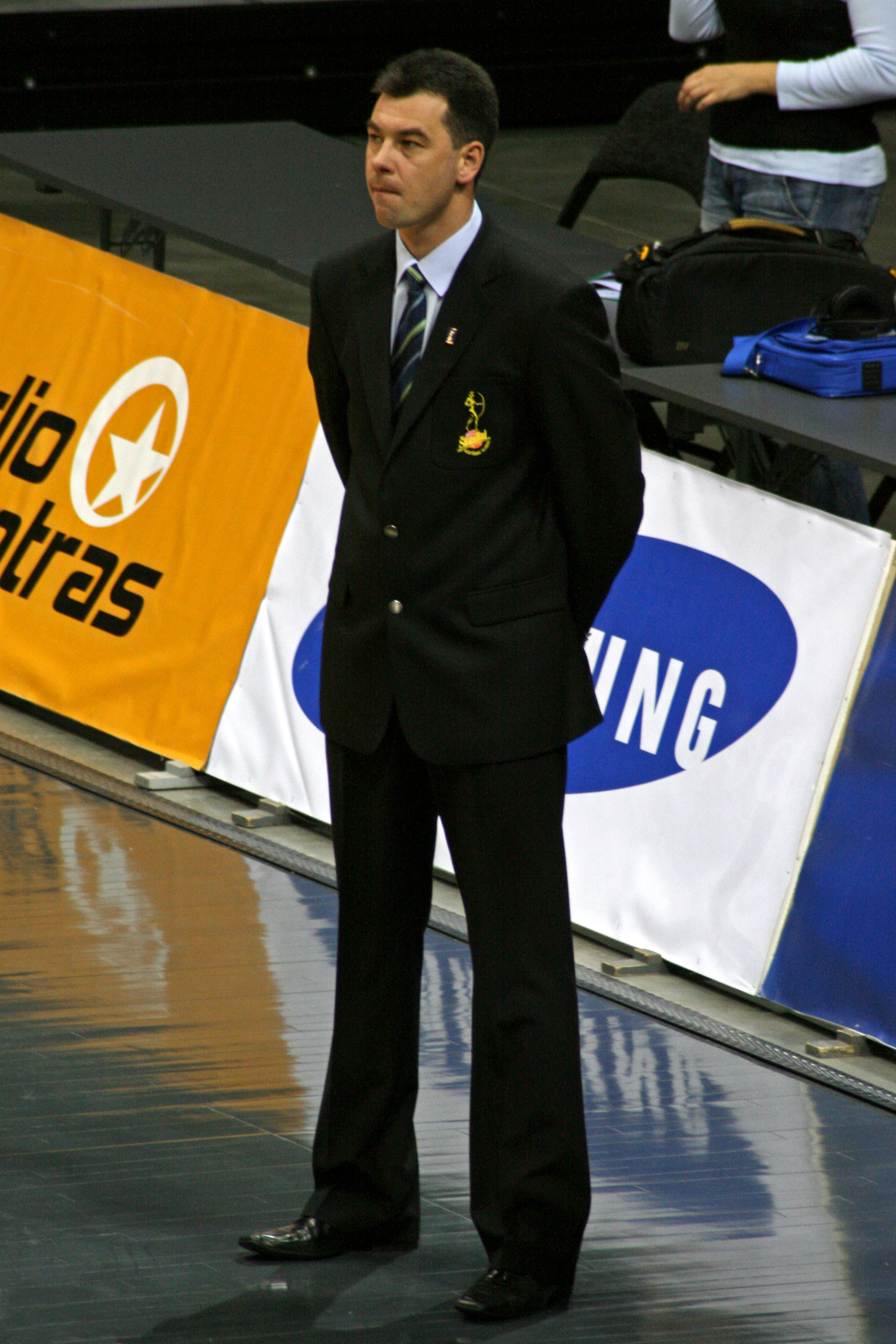
- Robertas Giedraitis with BC Šiauliai

Personal information
- Born: 29 August 1970 (age 56) Kaunas, Lithuanian SSR, Soviet Union
- Listed height: 6 ft 4 in (1.93 m)
- Listed weight: 190 lb (86 kg)

Career information
- Playing career: 1995–2005
- Position: Point guard

Career history

Playing
- 1995–2005: Šiauliai

Coaching
- 2005–2008: Šiauliai (assistant)
- 2008–2009: Šiauliai
- 2009–2010: Šiauliai (assistant)
- 2010–2012: Juventus Utena
- 2013: Lietkabelis Panevėžys
- 2013–2018: Šiauliai (assistant)
- 2018–2019: BC Delikatesas
- 2019–2023: Šiauliai (assistant)

Robertas Giedraitis (born August 29, 1970) is a Lithuanian basketball coach and former player. He was most recently the assistant coach for Šiauliai of the Lithuanian Basketball League (LKL). Giedraitis played his whole career with Šiauliai. He is currently the player with the most steals and the most assists made in Lithuanian Basketball League's history.

== Career ==
Before the 2005 season's start, Giedraitis retired as a player and became the assistant coach in Šiauliai. After 2006–07 season, Giedraitis took over as head coach of Šiauliai. On 8 July 2010, Robertas Giedraitis became the head coach of Juventus Utena. On 25 July 2011, Robertas Giedraitis renewed his contract with Juventus basketball team for another year. He left Juventus in the summer of 2012. In 2013, he briefly served as the head coach of Lietkabelis Panevėžys. He was also a head coach of BC Delikatesas in the 2018–2019 season.

== Personal life ==
Giedraitis' son Rokas is also a professional basketball player.
