= Tauras Jogėla =

Lithuanian basketball player (born 1993)

No. 22 – Šiauliai
- Position: Power forward / small forward
- League: LKL; EuroCup

Personal information
- Born: 2 May 1993 (age 33) Tauragė, Lithuania
- Listed height: 6 ft 8 in (2.03 m)
- Listed weight: 220 lb (100 kg)

Career information
- NBA draft: 2015: undrafted
- Playing career: 2012–present

Career history
- 2008–2014: Žalgiris Kaunas
- 2008–2012: →Žalgiris-Arvydas Sabonis school
- 2012–2013: → Lietkabelis Panevėžys
- 2014: → Nevėžis Kedainiai
- 2014–2015: Pieno žvaigdžės Pasvalys
- 2015–2016: CSU Pitești
- 2016: Vytautas Prienai–Birštonas
- 2016–2017: BK Barons
- 2017–2019: Wilki Morskie Szczecin
- 2019–2021: Soproni KC
- 2021–2022: BC Vienna
- 2022–2023: Labas Gas Prienai
- 2023–2024: CBet Jonava
- 2024–2025: Šiauliai
- 2025–2026: Górnik Wałbrzych
- 2026–: Šiauliai

Career highlights
- Latvian League All-Star (2017); FIBA Europe Under-16 Championship MVP (2009)
Medals
Representing Lithuania
Men's basketball
FIBA Europe Under-16 Championship
Silver medal – second place	2009 Lithuania	Team competition

Tauras Jogėla (born 2 May 1993) is a Lithuanian professional basketball player for Šiauliai of the Lithuanian Basketball League (LKL) and the EuroCup. Jogėla can play either forward position, although he's more accustomed to playing power forward.

== Early career ==
He won the Lithuanian Student Basketball League (MKL) Slam Dunk Contest in 2011.

== Professional career ==
On 21 November 2019, Jogėla signed with Soproni KC of the Hungarian League. Jogėla averaged 14 points and 4.5 rebounds per game for Soproni KC during the 2019–20 season. He re-signed with the team on 26 July 2020.

On 19 August 2023, Jogėla signed with CBet Jonava of the Lithuanian Basketball League (LKL).

On 18 July 2024, Jogėla signed with San Miguel Beermen of the Philippine Basketball Association (PBA) as the team's import for the 2024 PBA Governors' Cup., but he was replaced by Jordan Adams before the start of the conference.

On 16 August 2024, Jogėla signed with Šiauliai of the Lithuanian Basketball League (LKL).

On 14 July 2025, Jogėla signed with Górnik Wałbrzych of the Polish Basketball League (PLK).

On 18 June 2026, Jogėla once again signed with Šiauliai of the Lithuanian Basketball League (LKL) and the EuroCup.

== International career ==
Jogėla won a silver medal with Lithuania national basketball team at the 2009 Europe U-16 championship and was named the championship MVP.
