= Rokas Čepanonis =

Lithuanian basketball player

Personal information
- Born: 14 March 1989 (age 37) Vilnius, Lithuania
- Listed height: 207 cm (6 ft 9 in)
- Listed weight: 109 kg (240 lb)

Career information
- Playing career: 2006–present
- Position: Center
- Number: 34

Career history
- 2006–2010: Žalgiris-Arvydas Sabonis school Kaunas
- 2010: Aisčiai Kaunas
- 2010–2011: Techasas Panevėžys
- 2011–2012: SK Triobet Jonava
- 2013–2014: Delikatesas Joniškis
- 2014–2015: Sūduva-Mantinga Marijampolė
- 2015–2016: Delikatesas Joniškis
- 2016–2017: Vytis Šakiai
- 2017–2018: BC Tauragė

Rokas Čepanonis (born 14 March 1989) is a former PRO Lithuanian basketball player finished career in 2019. |NKL]]
