= Rashaun Broadus =

American basketball player

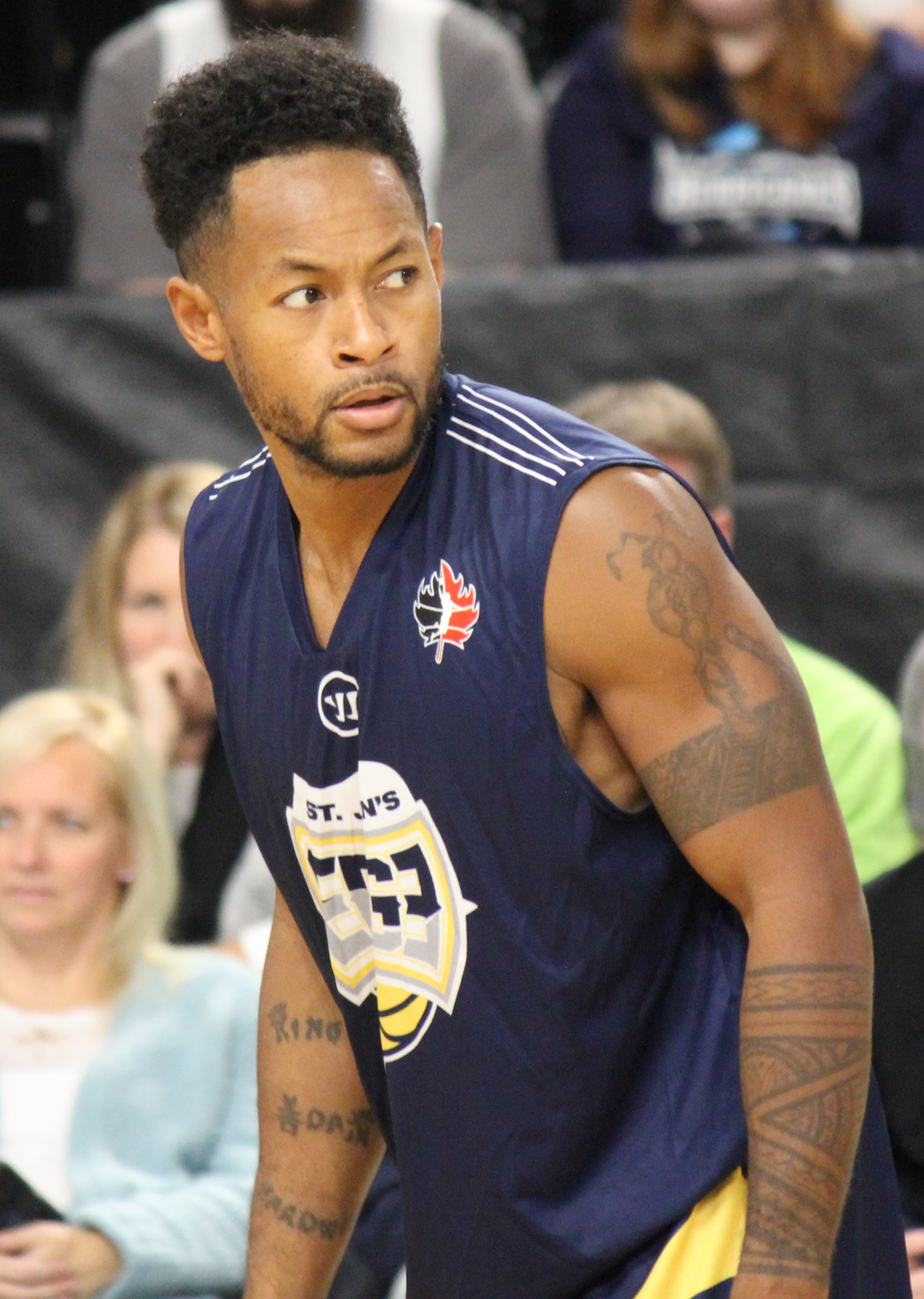
- Broadus with the Edge in 2017

Personal information
- Born: August 5, 1984 (age 42) Seattle, Washington, U.S.
- Listed height: 5 ft 11 in (1.80 m)
- Listed weight: 190 lb (86 kg)

Career information
- High school: Mililani (Mililani, Hawaii)
- College: Western Nebraska CC (2003–2005); BYU (2005–2007)
- NBA draft: 2007: undrafted
- Playing career: 2008–2018
- Position: Point guard

Career history
- 2008–2009: CSU Brașov
- 2009–2010: Sūduva Marijampolė
- 2010: Politekhnika-Halychyna
- 2010–2011: Šiauliai
- 2010–2012 – Summer: Edmonton Energy
- 2012–2013: Neptūnas Klaipėda
- 2014–2015: Juventus Utena
- 2015–2016: MKS Dąbrowa Górnicza
- 2016: Lietuvos rytas Vilnius
- 2017: Rasta Vechta
- 2017–2018: St. John's Edge
- 2018: Vytautas Prienai–Birštonas

Career highlights
- All-LKL Team (2015); 2× LKL All-Star (2011, 2015)

Rashaun Eneal Broadus (born August 5, 1984) is an American-born naturalized Albanian former professional basketball player. Born in Seattle, Washington, he attended Mililani High School in Mililani, Hawaii. A 5 ft 11 in (1.80 m) tall point guard, Broadus then competed for Western Nebraska Community College before transferring to BYU, where he became a starter at the NCAA Division I level.

As a professional, Broadus played his rookie season with the Romanian team CSU Brașov. In the following years, he had stints in the top leagues of Ukraine and Lithuania, earning All-Star honors in the latter. Most notably, the point guard took part in the EuroCup with Lietuvos rytas in 2016. Broadus has also competed for MKS Dąbrowa Górnicza in Poland and with the German team Rasta Vechta of the ProA. More recently, he played with the St. John's Edge of the NBL Canada. He signed with BC Vytautas in Lithuania, and played with the Ball brothers, LaMelo Ball and LiAngelo Ball to finish the 2018 season.

== Career statistics ==
=== Domestic Leagues ===
==== Regular season ====
Legend
GP	Games played	MPG	Minutes per game	FG%	Field goal percentage
3P%	3-point field goal percentage	FT%	Free throw percentage	RPG	Rebounds per game
APG	Assists per game	SPG	Steals per game	BPG	Blocks per game
PPG	Points per game	**Bold**	Career high		Led the league

Note: Only games in the primary domestic competitions are included. Therefore, games in cup or European competitions are left out.

Year	Team	League	GP	MPG	FG%	3P%	FT%	RPG	APG	SPG	BPG	PPG
2011–12	Šiauliai	LKL	31	26.0	.439	.352	.810	3.0	3.4	**1.6**	0.0	10.0
2012	Edmonton Energy	IBL	9	27.6	**.505**	.310	**.826**	2.3	**7.2**	1.1	0.0	14.7
2012–13	Neptūnas Klaipėda	LKL	29	23.1	.434	.274	.628	2.7	2.9	1.3	0.0	9.0
2014–15	Juventus Utena	LKL	**49**	30.4	.397	.293	.774	**3.7**	3.7	1.4	0.0	13.5
2015–16	MKS Dąbrowa Górnicza	PLK	31	**33.4**	.434	.313	.716	3.5	4.1	1.0	0.0	**16.0**
2016–17	Lietuvos rytas Vilnius	LKL	10	20.5	.375	**.469**	.667	2.0	3.2	0.5	0.0	7.3
2016–17	Rasta Vechta	BBL	16	21.7	.423	.277	.667	1.8	4.3	1.3	**0.1**	8.6
2017–18	St. John's Edge	NBLC	15	26.3	.395	.311	.667	1.7	3.8	0.7	0.0	9.8
