= David Weaver =

American basketball player (born 1987)

Free agent
- Position: Center

Personal information
- Born: October 9, 1987 (age 39) Asheville, North Carolina
- Listed height: 6 ft 10 in (2.08 m)
- Listed weight: 250 lb (113 kg)

Career information
- High school: Charles D. Owen (Black Mountain, North Carolina)
- College: Wake Forest (2006–2010)
- NBA draft: 2010: undrafted
- Playing career: 2010–present

Career history
- 2010–2011: Šiauliai
- 2011–2012: Czarni Słupsk
- 2012–2013: Riesen Ludwigsburg
- 2013: Dnipro-Azot
- 2013–2014: Benfica
- 2014–2015: MKS Dąbrowa Górnicza
- 2015–2016: Afyon Belediye
- 2016: Shiga Lakestars
- 2017: Nagoya Diamond Dolphins
- 2017–2018: TED Ankara Kolejliler
- 2018: Maccabi Rishon LeZion
- 2018–2019: Ankara DSİ
- 2019–2020: Kumamoto Volters
- 2020–2021: Pallacanestro Mantovana

Career highlights
- Israeli League Cup winner (2018); Portuguese League champion (2014); Portuguese Cup winner (2014); Portuguese Super Cup winner (2013); Polish League All-Star (2012); Lithuanian League All-Star (2011)

David Michael Weaver (born October 9, 1987) is an American professional basketball player for Pallacanestro Mantovana of the Italian Serie A2 Basket. He played college basketball for Wake Forest University before playing professionally in Lithuania, Poland, Germany, Ukraine, Portugal, Turkey, Japan and Israel.

== Early life and college career ==
Weaver attended Charles D. Owen High School in Black Mountain, North Carolina, where he averaged 13 points, 10 rebounds and six blocks per game as a junior. Weaver led the Warhorses to their first Western Highlands Conference title in 10 years and earned MVP honors at the conference tournament.

Weaver played college basketball for Wake Forest University's Demon Deacons, where he ranked 18th all-time at Wake Forest with 121 career games played. Weaver received the team's prestigious Murray Greason Award in 2008–09, the team's Skip Prosser Award in 2009–10 and won the team's Best Defensive Player Award in 2007–08.

== Professional career ==
=== Šiauliai (2010–2011) ===
Weaver started his professional career with the Lithuanian team Šiauliai. On March 12, 2011, Weaver participated in the 2011 LKL All-Star Game and participated in the Dunk Contest during the same event. In 23 Lithuanian League games, he averaged 11.5 points and 5.5 rebounds per game.

=== Czarni Słupsk (2011–2012) ===
On July 17, 2011, Weaver signed a one-year deal with the Polish team Czarni Słupsk. Weaver helped Słupsk reach the 2012 Polish League Playoffs.

=== Riesen Ludwigsburg (2012–2013) ===
On August 19, 2012, Weaver signed with the German team Riesen Ludwigsburg. However, on January 21, 2013, Weaver parted ways with Ludwigsburg after appearing in 18 games. One Day later, Weaver joined the Ukrainian team Dnipro-Azot for the rest of the season.

=== Benfica (2013–2014) ===
On July 31, 2013, Weaver signed with the Portuguese team Benfica for the 2013–14 season. Weaver helped Benfica win the 2014 Portuguese League Championship and the 2014 Portuguese Cup titles.

=== Dąbrowa Górnicza (2014–2015) ===
On September 11, 2014, Weaver returned to Poland for a second stint, signing a one-year deal with MKS Dąbrowa Górnicza. On February 7, 2015, Weaver recorded a career-high 32 points, shooting 13-of-17 from the field, along with eight rebounds and two blocks in a 95–96 loss to Siarka Tarnobrzeg.

=== Afyon Belediye (2015–2016) ===
On August 6, 2015, Weaver signed a one-year deal with Afyon Belediye of the Turkish Basketball First League. In 27 games played during the 2015–16 season, he averaged 17 points and 7.5 rebounds per game. Weaver helped Afyon reach the TBL playoffs.

=== Shiga Lakestars / Nagoya Diamond Dolphins (2016–2017) ===
On August 10, 2016, Weaver signed with the Japanese team Shiga Lakestars. On February 20, 2017, Weaver joined the Nagoya Diamond Dolphins for the rest of the season.

=== TED Ankara Kolejliler (2017–2018) ===
On August 24, 2017, Weaver returned to Turkey for a second stint, signing a one-year deal with TED Ankara Kolejliler. In 33 games played for Ankara, he averaged 15.8 points, 8.3 rebounds and 1.1 assists per game.

=== Maccabi Rishon LeZion / Ankara DSİ (2018–2019) ===
On September 20, 2018, Weaver signed with Israeli team Maccabi Rishon LeZion for the 2018–19 season. In October 2018, Weaver helped Rishon LeZion win the 2018 Israeli League Cup. He parted ways with Rishon LeZion on November 26, 2018, after appearing in seven games. Two days later, Weaver returned to Turkey for a third stint, signing with a one-year deal with Ankara DSİ. In 23 games played for Ankara, he averaged 16.3 points, 5.9 rebounds and 1.1 assists per game.

=== Kumamoto Volters (2019–2020) ===
On July 1, 2019, Weaver signed with the Kumamoto Volters of the Japanese B.League. He averaged 12.7 points and 6.2 assists per game.

=== Pallacanestro Mantovana (2020–present) ===
On August 5, 2020, Weaver signed with Pallacanestro Mantovana of the Italian Serie A2 Basket.
