= Mindaugas Žukauskas =

Lithuanian basketball player (born 1975)

Personal information
- Born: 24 August 1975 (age 51) Šiauliai, Lithuanian SSR, Soviet Union
- Listed height: 6 ft 7 in (2.01 m)
- Listed weight: 220 lb (100 kg)

Career information
- Playing career: 1995–2012
- Position: Small forward / power forward

Career history
- 1995–1997: BC Šiauliai
- 1997–2000: BC Žalgiris
- 2000–2001: Ljubljana Olimpija
- 2001–2006: Siena Montepaschi
- 2006–2009: Pesaro Scavolini
- 2009–2012: BC Šiauliai

Career highlights
- Europe Youth champion (1996); 2× LKL champion (1998, 1999); 2x Saporta Cup (1998, 2002); NEBL champion (1999); Euroleague champion (1999); Slovenian Cup (2001); SBL champion (2001); Eurobasket champion (2003); Lega Basket champion (2004); Italian Cup (2004)
Medals
Men's basketball
Representing Lithuania
Olympic Games
| Bronze medal – third place | 1996 Atlanta | National team |
European Championships
| Gold medal – first place | 2003 Sweden | National team |

Mindaugas Žukauskas (born 24 August 1975 in Šiauliai) is a retired Lithuanian professional basketball player, a former captain of the Lithuanian national basketball team. He is a small forward 2.01 m tall. Žukauskas is currently a manager for BC Šiauliai.

== Career statistics ==
Legend
| GP | Games played | GS | Games started | MPG | Minutes per game |
| FG% | Field-goal percentage | 3P% | 3-point field-goal percentage | FT% | Free-throw percentage |
| RPG | Rebounds per game | APG | Assists per game | SPG | Steals per game |
| BPG | Blocks per game | PPG | Points per game | PIR | Performance index rating |
| **Bold** | Career high |

=== Euroleague ===
| Year | Team | GP | GS | MPG | FG% | 3P% | FT% | RPG | APG | SPG | BPG | PPG | PIR |
|---|---|---|---|---|---|---|---|---|---|---|---|---|---|
| 2000–01 | Union Olimpija | 15 | 7 | 20.1 | .464 | .500 | .667 | 2.2 | .9 | .8 | .1 | **7.5** | 6.2 |
| 2002–03 | Montepaschi Siena | **22** | 19 | **23.4** | .500 | **.519** | **.955** | 1.7 | 1.2 | 1.0 | **.2** | 6.5 | 4.9 |
| 2003–04 | Montepaschi Siena | **22** | 10 | 20.1 | .457 | .417 | .846 | 1.8 | **1.4** | 1.0 | .0 | 5.2 | 4.5 |
| 2004–05 | Montepaschi Siena | 20 | **12** | 17.3 | **.543** | .472 | .722 | 2.3 | 1.3 | 1.1 | .1 | 5.1 | 5.1 |
| 2005–06 | Montepaschi Siena | 13 | 3 | 16.0 | .692 | .360 | .882 | **2.7** | 1.0 | **1.2** | .0 | 4.6 | **6.8** |

== Awards and achievements ==
- Olympic Bronze medalist - 1996
- LKL champion - 1998, 1999
- European Cup Winner - 1998
- NEBL champion - 1999
- Euroleague champion - 1999
- Slovenian champion - 2001
- European champion - 2003
- Euroleague 3rd place - 2003, 2004
- Italian Serie A champion - 2004

His former teams include Lithuanian Žalgiris Kaunas, Italian Montepaschi Siena and Scavolini Pesaro, and Slovenian KK Union Olimpija.

== State awards ==
- Lithuania: Recipient of the Officer's Cross of the Order of the Lithuanian Grand Duke Gediminas (1996)
- Lithuania: Recipient of the Commander's Grand Cross of the Order of the Lithuanian Grand Duke Gediminas (2003)
