= BC Delikatesas =

Delikatesas
- Leagues: National Basketball League
- Founded: 1994
- History: „Žiemgala“ (1994-2000) „Žiemgala-Šiaurės Vilkas“ (2000-2005) „Delikatesas“ (2005-present)
- Arena: Joniškis „Saulės“ elementary school gym, Joniškis
- Location: Joniškis, Lithuania
- Team colors: White, red
- Head coach: (Lithuania) Zilvinas Petraitis
- Affiliation(s): BC Šiauliai; BC Kelmė
- Championships: LKAL 2004
Home	Away

BC „Delikatesas“ is a professional Joniškis, Lithuania basketball club, currently playing in National Basketball League.

== Club achievements ==
- 2014–2015 season: NKL Round of 16

== Team roster ==
BC Delikatesas roster
Players
Coaches

Pos.	No.	Nat.	Name	Ht.	Wt.	Age
C	4	(Lithuania)	Daunys, Edvinas	2.00 m (6 ft 7 in)	93 kg (205 lb)	24 – 6 February 2001
SG	5	(Lithuania)	Visockis, Deividas	1.92 m (6 ft 4 in)	83 kg (183 lb)	24 – 31 January 2001
PF	7	(Lithuania)	Globys, Andrius	1.98 m (6 ft 6 in)	105 kg (231 lb)	30 – 29 July 1995
G	12	(Lithuania)	Stankevičius, Eimantas	1.92 m (6 ft 4 in)	90 kg (198 lb)	27 – 1 April 1998
C	15	(Lithuania)	Ulvydas, Rokas	2.11 m (6 ft 11 in)	115 kg (254 lb)	30 – 29 December 1994
PG	16	(Lithuania)	Jankevičius, Gedas	1.85 m (6 ft 1 in)	70 kg (154 lb)	23 – 15 July 2002
SF	18	(Lithuania)	Gasiūnas, Matas	1.95 m (6 ft 5 in)	90 kg (198 lb)	23 – 2 September 2002
PF	8	(Lithuania)	Kancleris, Nedas	2.07 m (6 ft 9 in)	88 kg (194 lb)	25 – 2 February 2000
PG	9	(Lithuania)	Pilauskas, Aistis	1.88 m (6 ft 2 in)	82 kg (181 lb)	27 – 8 April 1998
F/C	14	(Lithuania)	Kleišys, Arminas	2.04 m (6 ft 8 in)	102 kg (225 lb)	26 – 2 March 1999

Head coach

- (Lithuania) Robertas Giedraitis

Legend

- (C) Team captain
- Injured

- Roster
Updated: 10-15-2019

== Notable players and coaches ==
- (Lithuania) Andrius Šležas
