= Vytautas Šarakauskas =

Lithuanian basketball player

BC Jurbarkas-Karys
- Position: Center / power forward
- League: NKL

Personal information
- Born: 8 February 1982 (age 44) Vilnius, Lithuanian SSR, Soviet Union
- Listed height: 2.04 m (6 ft 8 in)
- Listed weight: 110 kg (243 lb)

Career information
- NBA draft: 2004: undrafted
- Playing career: 2004–present

Career history
- 2004–2006: BC Perlas
- 2006–2009: BC Sakalai
- 2009–2012: BC Šiauliai
- 2012–2017: BC Neptūnas
- 2017–2018: BC Šiauliai
- 2018–2020: Neptūnas-Akvaservis
- 2020–2021: BC Kretinga
- 2021–present: Jurbarkas-Karys

Career highlights
- NKL champion (2024)

Vytautas Šarakauskas (born 8 February 1982 in Vilnius, Lithuanian SSR) is a Lithuanian professional basketball player for Jurbarkas-Karys of the National Basketball League (NKL).

== Professional career ==
Šarakauskas started his career with SSK–Perlas Vilnius in the LKAL league. He went undrafted in the 2004 NBA draft. In 2006, Šarakauskas moved to BC Sakalai of the LKL league. He averaged 10.8 points per game and 6.6 rebounds per game his rookie season in the league.

Three seasons later, Šarakauskas signed with BC Šiauliai. Šarakauskas soon became a starter for the team. During the 2010–11 season, he nearly averaged a double-double in both the LKL league and the BBL league. In 2012, he moved to BC Neptūnas.

In the summer of 2011, Šarakauskas led his national team to a fifth place at the 2011 World Military Basketball Championship.

== Player profile ==
Šarakauskas is 2.04 meters (6 feet 8 inches) tall and plays the power forward and the center positions. He has averaged nearly one rebound every four minutes on the court across his career.
