= BC Šiauliai =

Basketball team in Šiauliai, Lithuania

Šiauliai
- Nickname: Šiaulių Šiauliai
- Leagues: LKL; EuroCup
- Founded: 1984; 42 years ago
- History: Šiaulių Kelininkas; 1984–1994; Šiaulių Šiauliai; 1994–2021; Šiaulių Šiauliai-7bet; 2021–2022; Šiaulių Šiauliai; 2022–2024; Šiaulių Šiauliai–Casino Admiral; 2024–2025; Šiaulių Šiauliai; 2025–present
- Arena: Šiauliai Arena
- Capacity: 5,700
- Location: Šiauliai, Lithuania
- Team colors: Yellow, black
- President: Artūras Nacickas
- General manager: Irmantas Kukulskis
- Head coach: Darius Songaila
- Team captain: Martynas Pacevičius
- Ownership: Artūras Nacickas (75%); Šiauliai City Municipality (25%)
- Championships: 3 Baltic Basketball League
- Website: www.bcsiauliai.lt
Home	Away

BC Šiauliai (Lithuanian: Krepšinio klubas Šiauliai) is the professional basketball club of Šiauliai, Lithuania. The club competes in the Lithuanian Basketball League (LKL) and in the EuroCup. It has won the 3rd place award (behind Lithuanian basketball giants Lietuvos Rytas and Žalgiris) in the LKL a record 9 times.

== History ==
=== BC Kelininkas (1982–1994) ===
The team was formed in 1984 and participated in the second-tier Lithuanian league. Following Tauras Šiauliai club bankrupt, BC Kelininkas became city's primary basketball club. During the 1994–95 season in LKAL, BC Kelininkas played his last season under this name. BC Kelininkas, led by Antanas Sireika, Robertas Giedraitis, Donatas Slanina and Mindaugas Žukauskas, finished with the 18–2 regular season record and advanced into the playoffs. There they successfully completed two stages by overcoming Banga Kaunas and SAVY Vilnius. Though, later they were defeated by Vilnius LPA twice. Then BC Kelininkas, due to the sponsorship reasons, was renamed to BC Šiauliai.

=== First victories and titles (1994–2003) ===
In June, 1994 Adomas Klimavičius and Šiaulių plentas company chief engineer Algimantas Mikšys participated in the LKL board meeting, where they presented filmed material about Šiauliai city infrastructure, budget, team roster and coaches. Then the board members voted: ten members from thirteen voted for BC Šiauliai request acceptance to join LKL. The team successfully joined LKL and was coached by Antanas Sireika.

After two loses to Lavera Kaunas and Statyba Vilnius, BC Šiauliai returned home. During the first game in Tauras Sports Hall, BC Šiauliai achieved club's first victory in LKL versus NECA Kaunas 93–75. Oleg Bulancev scored 25 points, Mindaugas Žukauskas – 18 points, Arvydas Tamkevičius added 17 points back then.

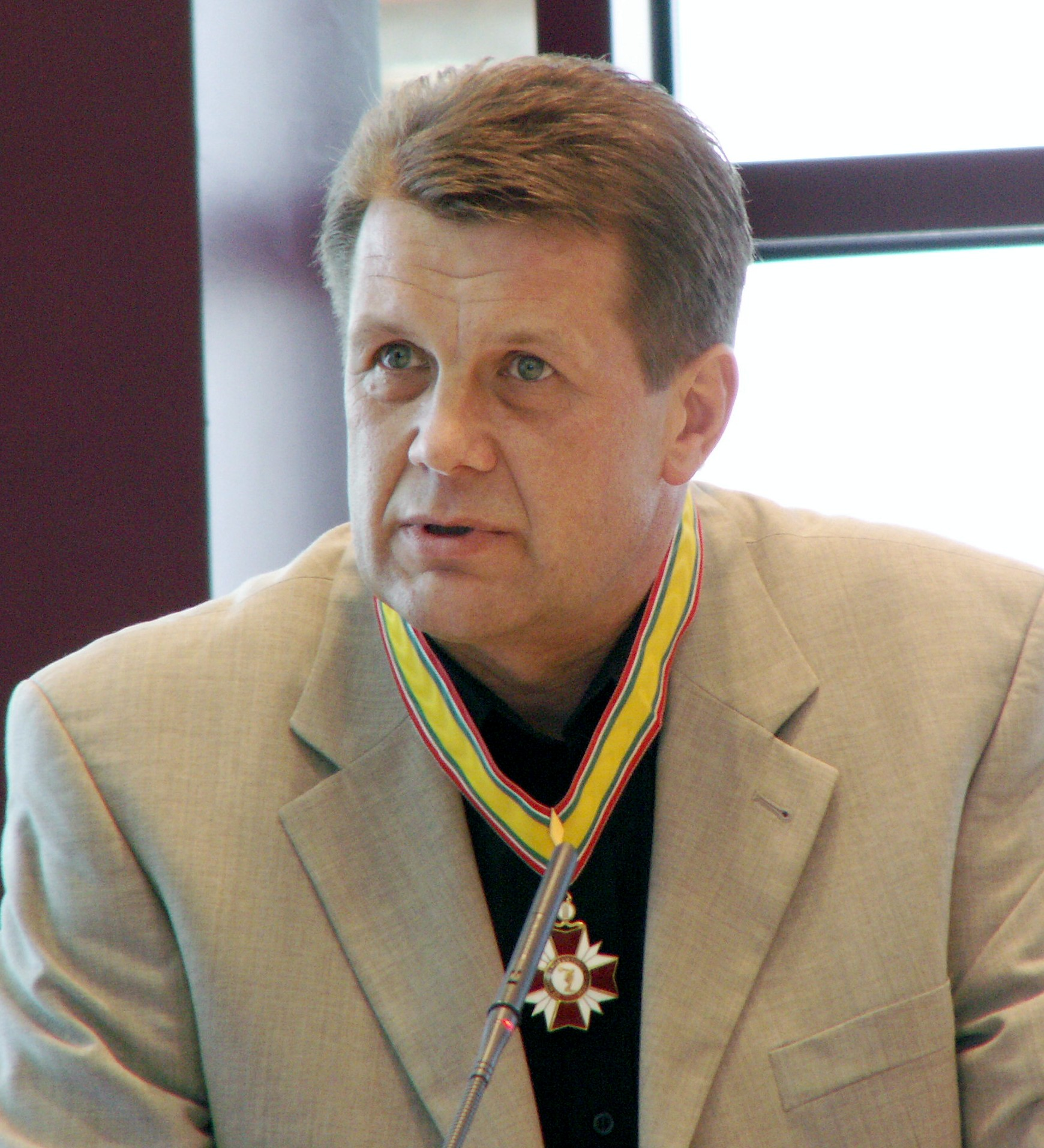
Former BC Šiauliai player Antanas Sireika worked as the head coach of the club for seven straight seasons before joining Lithuania men's national basketball team, which won the European title during his debut years.

Following successful debut season in LKL, where they finished 4th, the club achieved the right to participate in the 1995–96 FIBA Korać Cup tournament. The sorcery told that their first opponent will be Śląsk Wrocław from Poland. BC Šiauliai showed extraordinary fighting efficiency in the second half and defeated the Polish team 100–88, thanks to the solid 24-points performance by Giedrius Pečiulionis.

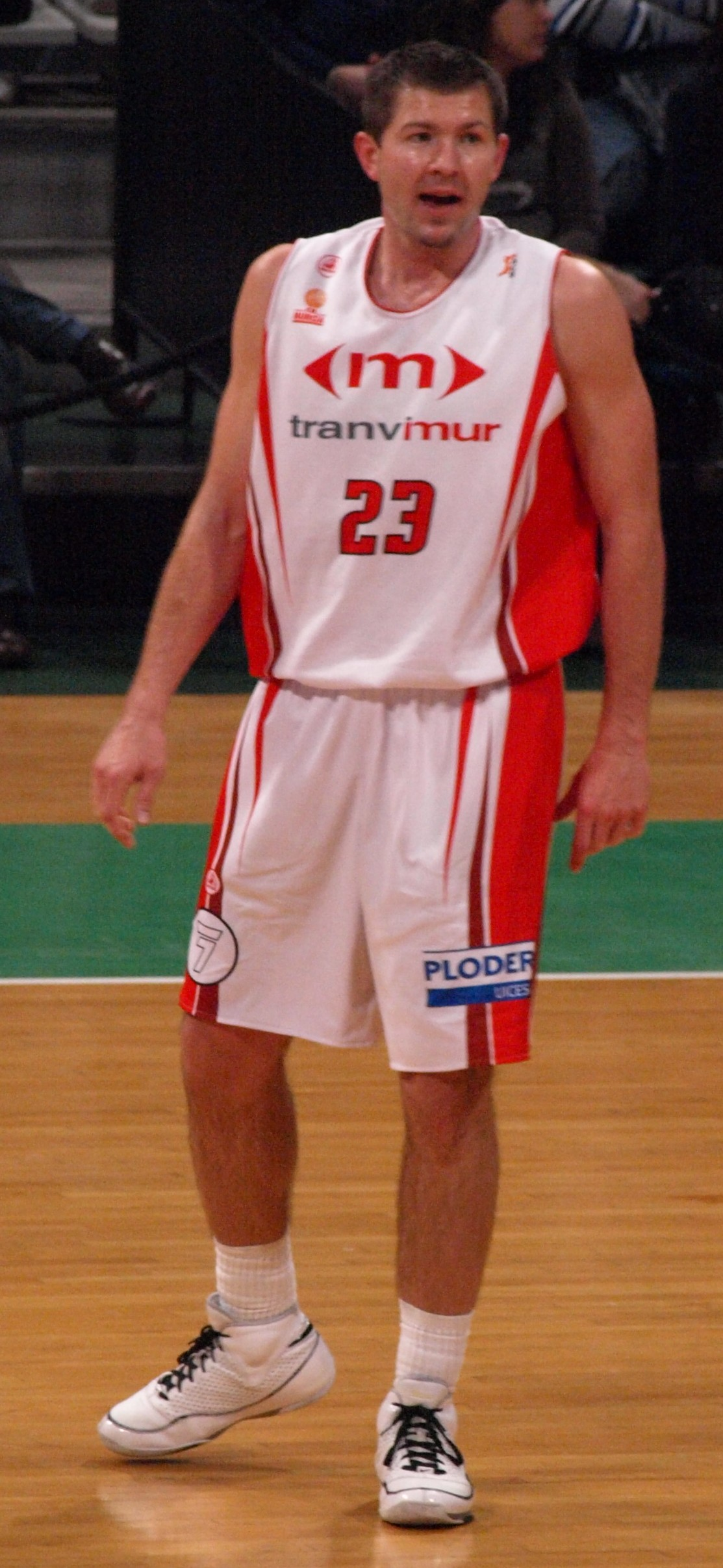
Donatas Slanina began his career in BC Šiauliai.

BC Šiauliai won the 32nd Lithuanian men's basketball cup. The team joined the tournament in the third stage where they defeated Olimpas Plungė twice. The final four took place in Šiauliai. In the semi-final BC Šiauliai overcome BC Šilutė 83–68 and in the final, after a spirited battle, they won versus Statyba Vilnius 96–88.

On April 1, 1996, Mindaugas Žukauskas has performed a record appearance, when BC Šiauliai met the regular season winners Atletas Kaunas in the LKL quarter-final. Žukauskas led his hometown team to the 91–86 victory by scoring 45 points (11 two-pointers, 5 three-pointers and 8 free-throws). This astonishing performance remains unimproved until the nowadays.

The 1998 LKF Cup Final Four was hosted in Šiauliai and the team was willing to defend their last season' golden title at any costs. Though, they were overshadowed by the newly formed Lietuvos rytas-Statyba Vilnius 65–72.

During the 1999–00 LKL season, BC Šiauliai won their first-ever LKL bronze medals by reaching the 3–1 revenge versus Sakalai Vilnius, who crushed their bronze dreams previous season. First series game, which BC Šiauliai unexpectedly won 77–62 in Vilnius, is regarded as crucial. The series ended 3–1.

Another record performance happened on March 3, 2001, when Giedrius Pečiulionis realized 11 three-pointers from 16 versus BC Panevėžys. Totally, Pečiulionis scored 41 points that night and led BC Šiauliai to the excellent 107–69 triumph. This performance was just 2 three-pointers behind from the LKL record of 13 three-pointers held by Joey Vickery since 1996, and is the second result in the whole LKL history. Third result of 10 three-pointers per one game is also held by Giedrius Pečiulionis since 1998.

During the 2000–01 season, BC Šiauliai achieved the LKL all-time scoring record of 143 points versus BC Suvalkija in Marijampolė. Totally, BC Šiauliai players realized 49 two-pointers with the stunning 86% accuracy and 39 free-throws. In the same season BC Šiauliai won their second consecutive LKL bronze medals, winning series 3–1 versus Alita Alytus. The final victorious 62–97 match was played in Alytus.

BC Šiauliai failed to extend their bronze medals streak this time, losing the LKL bronze series 2–3 in 2002 and 1–3 in 2003 to Alita Alytus. Although, that was just a silence before the true storm.

=== True LKL bronze domination (2004–2010) ===
During the 2003–04 season, BC Šiauliai returned to the bronze LKL throne, defeating Sakalai Vilnius 3–2 in the final series game 84–78.

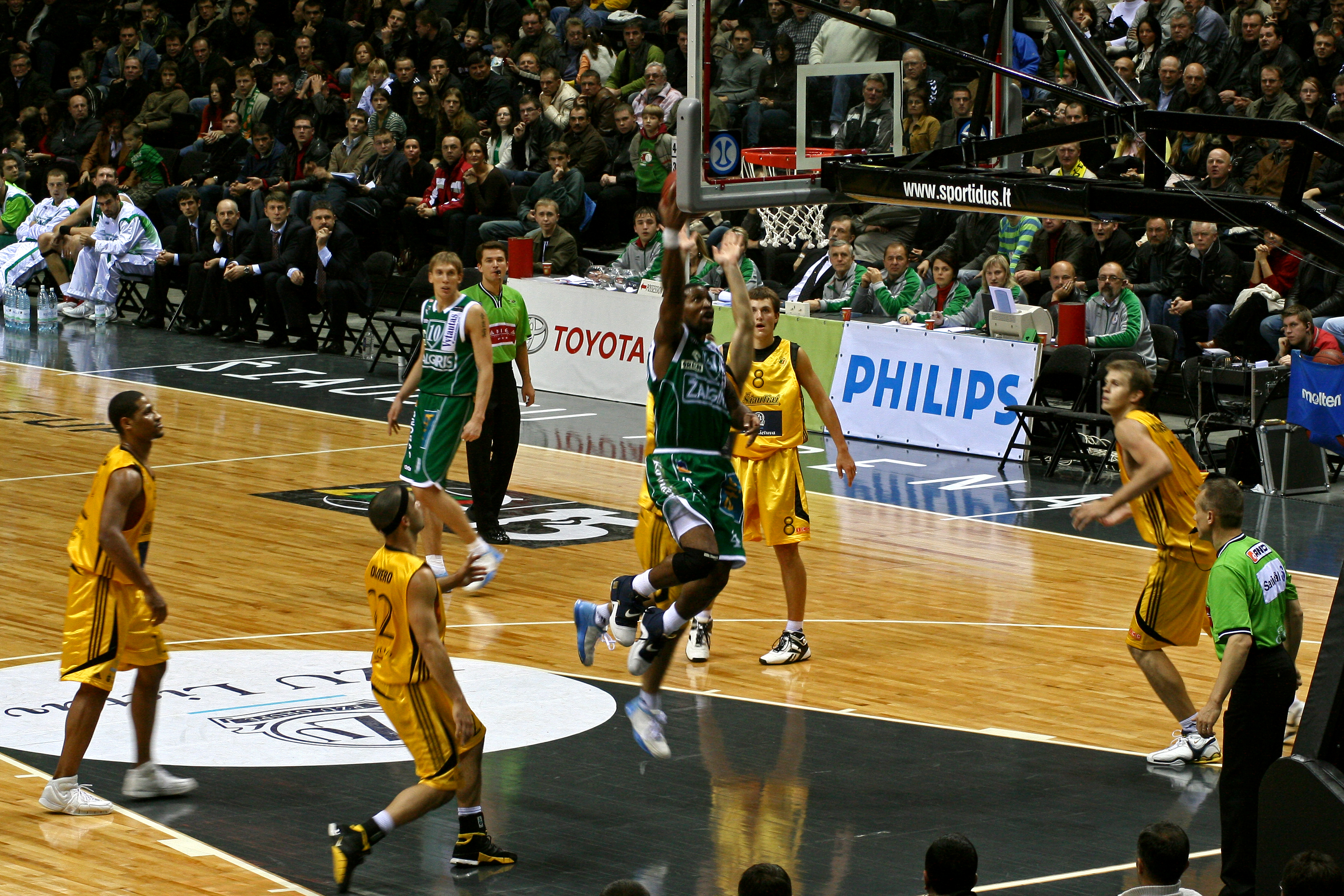
BC Šiauliai playing LKL game versus Žalgiris Kaunas in home arena.

Next season they totally won 3 bronze medals in three different competitions. First of all, BC Šiauliai participated in the FIBA Europe cup Final Four, held in Moscow. They were crushed 94–57 by Lokomotiv Rostov in the semi-final, though they successfully rehabilitated next day with the 86–71 victory over EURAS Ekaterinburg and were decorated with the season' first bronze medals. Secondly, they continued their solid season in Baltic Basketball League, reaching the semi-final. They failed to overcome the legendary Lithuanian club Žalgiris Kaunas there, losing 89–61, but were able to defeat BK Ventspils 97–87 and won their second bronze medals that season. Astonishing season ended with the 3–1 series triumph over Sakalai Vilnius during the LKL bronze final, winning the club's fourth LKL bronze medals.

In the 2005–06 season, BC Šiauliai once again won BBL bronze medals, defeating Nevėžis Kėdainiai 76–59. That day the team was led by Tadas Klimavičius (12 points, 15 rebounds) and Artūras Jomantas (20 points, 8 rebounds, 4 assists and steals). The team also won their fifth LKL bronze medals after sweeping Nevėžis Kėdainiai 3–0. All the series victories were achieved with the average of 15.7 points.

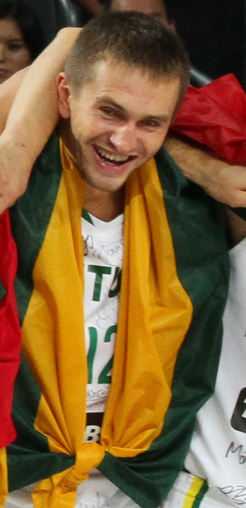
Tadas Klimavičius, one of that time primary BC Šiauliai players, who won three LKL bronze medals sets.

During the 2006–07 season, the club won their sixth bronze medals, defeating Neptūnas Klaipėda 3–0 as well. Though, this time two away games were won respectively by only two and three points.

Before the 2007–08 season, BC Šiauliai club moved to their newly built 5,700 seats Šiauliai Arena. First official game there was played on September 28, 2007, versus Aisčiai-Atletas, winning it 73–61. That season they won the LKF Cup bronze medals for the first time, losing to the Euroleague participant Lietuvos rytas Vilnius only 66–71 in the semi-final, but confidently defeating Neptūnas Klaipėda 111–92 for the bronze. The final four was held in Šiauliai. BC Šiauliai also won their seventh LKL bronze medals, after smashing BC Alytus 3–0. The team has shown impressive sports form with 95.7 points per game in the series.

In the 2008–09 season BC Šiauliai won their second LKF Cup bronze medals. In the semi-final they once again lost to Lietuvos rytas Vilnius 94–66, but overcome Aisčiai Kaunas team, which was led by Donatas Motiejūnas, to win the bronze 97–89. Records times returned for BC Šiauliai when Andrius Šležas participated in the 2009 LKL Three-point Shootout contest. During the tournament semi-final, he accurately made 27 of 30 three-pointers and achieved the tournament record, which is unimproved until the nowadays. Although, Šležas never won the title, despite competing in the contest three times. In the spring of 2009, they qualified for the LKL bronze final once again. BC Šiauliai won first two series games after OT with identical result of 101–93. Though, Neptūnas did not gave up after first two exhausting games and won two consecutive games as well: 90–95 and 78–75. BC Šiauliai secured their bronze title in the fifth series game, defeating Neptūnas 80–73, and winning their eighth victorious LKL bronze medals series 3–2.

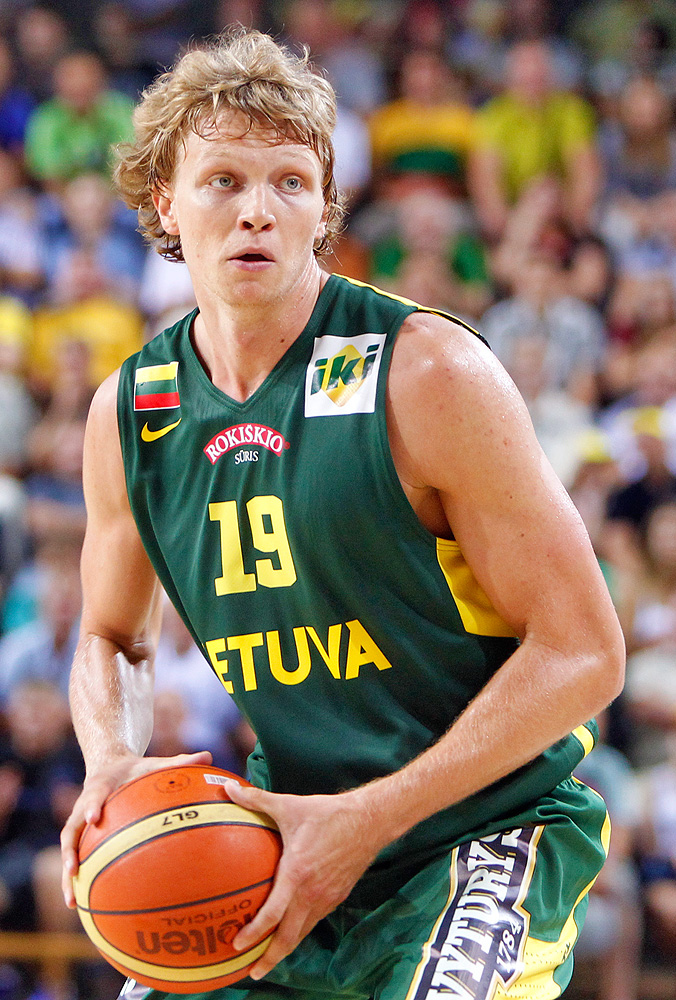
Mindaugas Kuzminskas, the club's major star in the 2009–10 season.

BC Šiauliai firmly expanded their bronze medals collection in the 2009–10 season. As year before, they began with the LKF Cup bronze, winning versus Nevėžis Kėdainiai 76–79. Derrick Low (23 points, 6 assists) and Deividas Gailius (21 points) led BC Šiauliai to the close victory back then. Derrick Low also participated in the 2010 LKL Three-point Shootout contest, winning first such title for the club. In the tournament final he scored 22 points and outperformed Adas Juškevičius who scored 21. BC Šiauliai won another thriller 84–83 in the BBL bronze final versus BK Ventspils after Vytautas Šarakauskas buzzer-beater. The referees counted it in, however BK Ventspils submitted a protest by telling that it was made after time. BBL accepted their protest and decided to rematch the game on Sunday. Though, BK Ventspils club did not show up in the game and technically lost it 20–0. BC Šiauliai players were awarded with the club's third BBL bronze medals set. They also captured their season' third bronze medals in the LKL bronze final by defeating Juventus Utena in the third series game 87–67, winning the series 3–0. It was the club's seventh straight LKL bronze medals set. Following the outstanding season ending, team leader Mindaugas Kuzminskas, who averaged 16.7 points and 6 rebounds per game in LKL, signed with the legendary Žalgiris Kaunas.

=== Tough times (2011–2013) ===
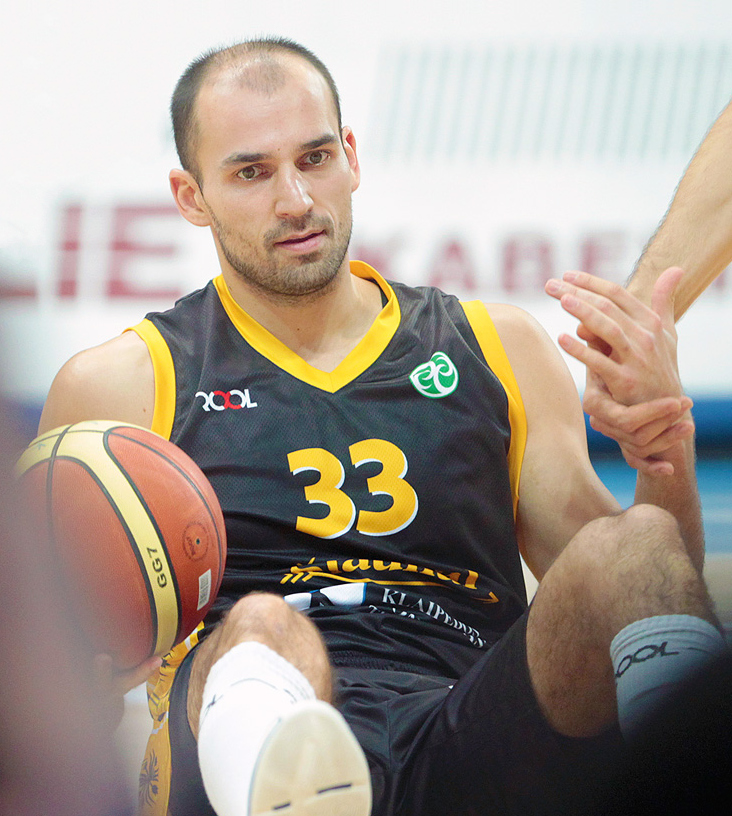
Rolandas Alijevas leadership did not led to successful results in the 2012–13 season.

After seven solid seasons, BC Šiauliai had difficult times during the next three. Edvinas Ruzgas won the 2011 LKL Three-point Shootout contest, however it was the only title BC Šiauliai received that season. The club achieved only 7th spot in the BBL that season. Furthermore, they also surprisingly lost the LKL quarter-final to Juventus Utena and did not qualify into the Eurocup, staying without the European competitions for the first time after nine consecutive seasons.

BC Šiauliai returned to the BBL bronze final during the 2011–12 BBL season, but they were defeated by VEF Rīga there. The team finished 3rd during the 2011–12 LKL regular season and advanced into the LKL bronze final, though they were crushed 3–1 there by Rūdupis Prienai.

The 2012–13 season was another dark spot for the BC Šiauliai club history. Firstly, they were eliminated in the quarter-final of BBL by BK Ventspils due to the unfavorable points ratio as they lost the second series game 80–87 and the first game was won only by 3 points (81–78). It was the club's all-time worst performance in BBL. In the 2012–13 LKL regular season they finished only 6th and were defeated by BC Prienai once again, this time – at the quarter-final 2–0.

=== BBL champions (2013–2016) ===
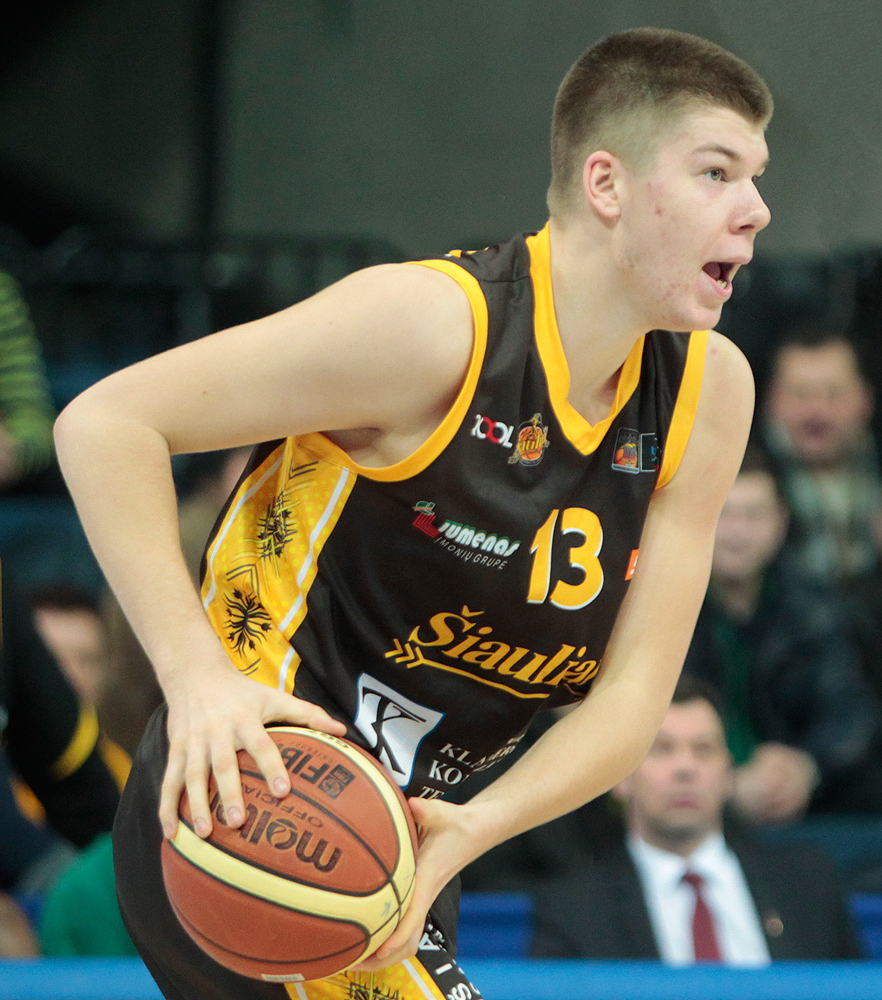
Rokas Giedraitis led BC Šiauliai to two consecutive BBL titles before joining Lietuvos rytas Vilnius in 2015. He also led the team to their third straight title in 2016 after returning to the club.

Following the three completely dry seasons, BC Šiauliai started expanding their trophies collection again. First of all, Travis Leslie won the 2014 LKL Slam Dunk Contest by performing tremendous dunks. He also led Šiauliai to the 2013–14 Baltic Basketball League title and was named MVP twice: in the regular season and in the finals. Despite that, BC Šiauliai were eliminated in the LKL quarter-final again by the future finalist Neptūnas Klaipėda. Travis Leslie joined Lietuvos rytas Vilnius after this season and won the LKL Slam Dunk Contest again by dunking over Mercedes-Benz and Grigorij Khizhnyak. BC Šiauliai retained their BBL title by defeating BK Ventspils in the finals 2–0 during the following season. Second game, which was won 88–80, required OT. Gintaras Leonavičius was named MVP of the tournament. BC Šiauliai also recovered their LKF Cup bronze title that season. However, the 2014–15 LKL season playoffs ended early for them, after being eliminated in the quarter-final for the third straight season, this time – by Lietuvos rytas Vilnius 3–0. Following the end of the season, two BC Šiauliai players: Rokas Giedraitis and Julius Jucikas joined Rytas.

On July 29, 2015, the club was invited to join the 2015–16 FIBA Europe Cup tournament, which is the alternative version of the 2nd tier European tournament Eurocup, organized by FIBA. Though, the team did not advance into the second stage of the FIBA Europe Cup due to the unfavorable points difference. On April 6, 2016, the team won their third BBL title in a row. In the LKL, the club lost a tough series to future finalist BC Neptūnas 1:3, despite strong efforts from the returning Rokas Giedraitis, who was loaned to the team by BC Lietuvos rytas.

=== Decline and the return of Antanas Sireika (2016–2023) ===
The 2016–2017 season, however, became one of the worst nightmares in club history. Coach Petrauskas left the team, and was replaced by longtime former player and assistant coach Vaidas Pauliukėnas. The team also left the BBL, but participated in the BBL Cup tournament (finishing 4th). Due to poor financial situation, many players left the club, resulting in the team plummeting to the bottom of the LKL, and in the 2016–17 FIBA Europe Cup, where Šiauliai lost all 6 games. Longtime president Adomas Klimavičius resigned, and was replaced by former player Mindaugas Žukauskas. Financial problems and scandals plagued the team. Despite some improvement by the end of the season, in large part due to great performances by Martynas Echodas, Šiauliai still finished in last place in the LKL - the team's worst season in history.

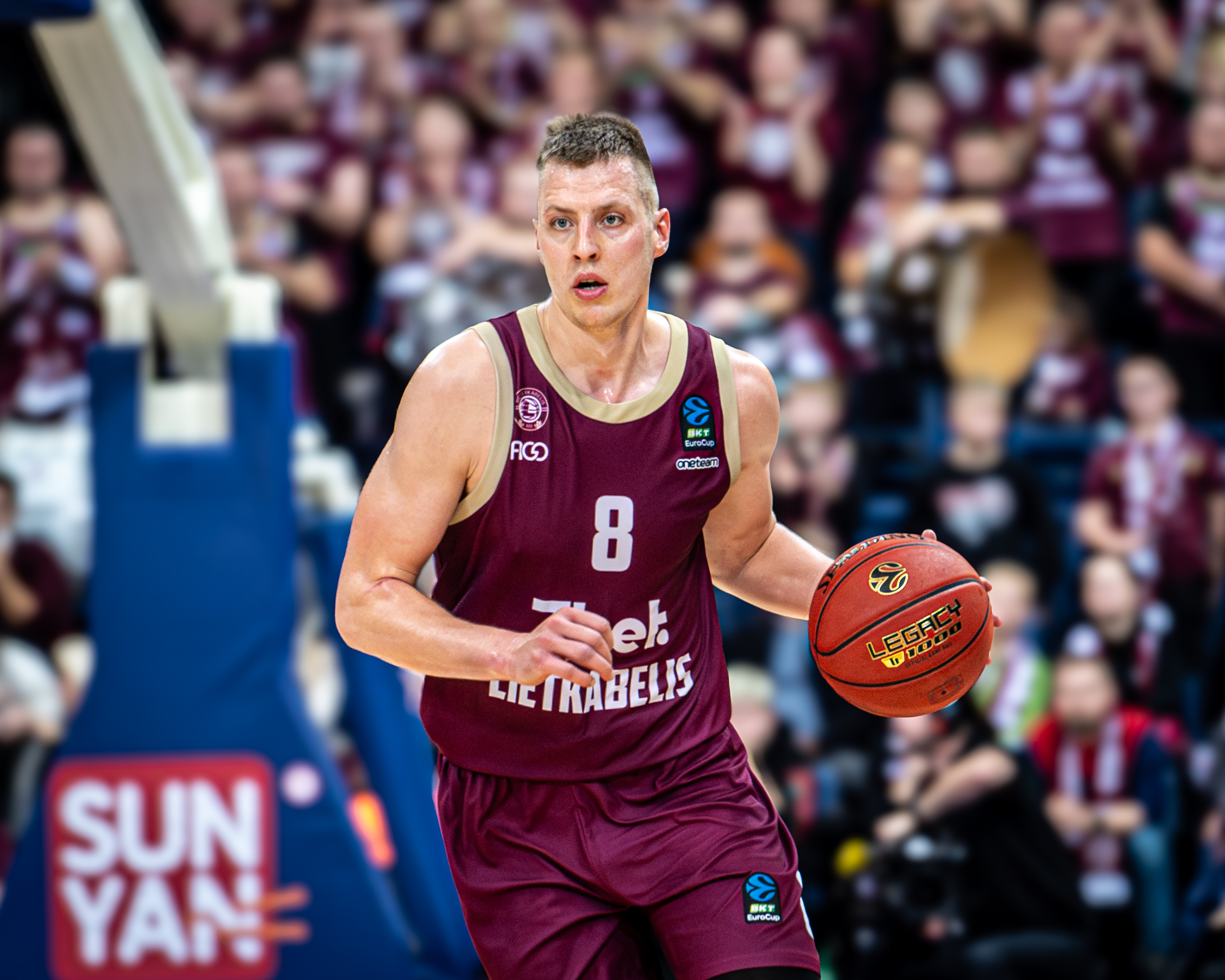
Donatas Sabeckis, one of BC Šiauliai leaders during his four-seasons stint in 2016–2018 and 2021–2023

Antanas Sireika, legendary coach of the team, was announced as the coach for the 2017–18 season. Šiauliai then signed players like Nick Zeisloft, whose many clutch baskets helped during the season, Arminas Urbutis and the returning Vytautas Šarakauskas, re-signed point guard Donatas Sabeckis and loaned Laurynas Birutis, a talented young center, from BC Žalgiris. Šiauliai also returned to the Baltic Basketball League. Šiauliai initially struggled, including an 8-game losing streak at the start of the season, leading to many fans remembering the poor 2016-2017 season. By March, the team had completely recovered, winning 9 of their last 14 games, including upset victory at home over BC Žalgiris 93:90, and two wins over BC Neptūnas 78:71 in Klaipėda and 77:76 at home. A blowout win over BC Lietkabelis, last year's LKL finalist, 87:65, helped the team secure 5th place in the LKL regular season. In the LKL quarterfinals, returning after a one-year absence, Šiauliai faced the same Lietkabelis team. The young team could not overcome the veteran leadership of Lietkabelis, and lost the series 1:3, though ending the season on a positive note. In the 2018 Karaliaus Mindaugo taurė, Šiauliai faced champion Žalgiris Kaunas, and led by an amazing performance by Birutis, who scored 35 points and had 11 rebounds, fought the champions to the limit, losing only in the end 78:85. In the Baltic Basketball League, to which the team returned after a season absence, Šiauliai was one of the best teams all season, tying first place with BK Jūrmala in regular season group play. In the quarterfinals, Šiauliai defeated BK Ogre on aggregate, 175:162 (78:75 at home and 97:87 away), before facing tournament favorite BC Pieno žvaigždės in the semifinals. The young Šiauliai team lost the series on aggregate, 148:159 (84:91 at home and 64:68 away) to Pieno žvaigždės, who went on to win the BBL. In the 3rd place matchup, Šiauliai faced BC Tartu, and won the first game in Tartu 88:86, but lost in a huge upset at home 70:78 and lost on aggregate, 158:164, leaving the 3 time BBL champions with a disappointing 4th-place finish.

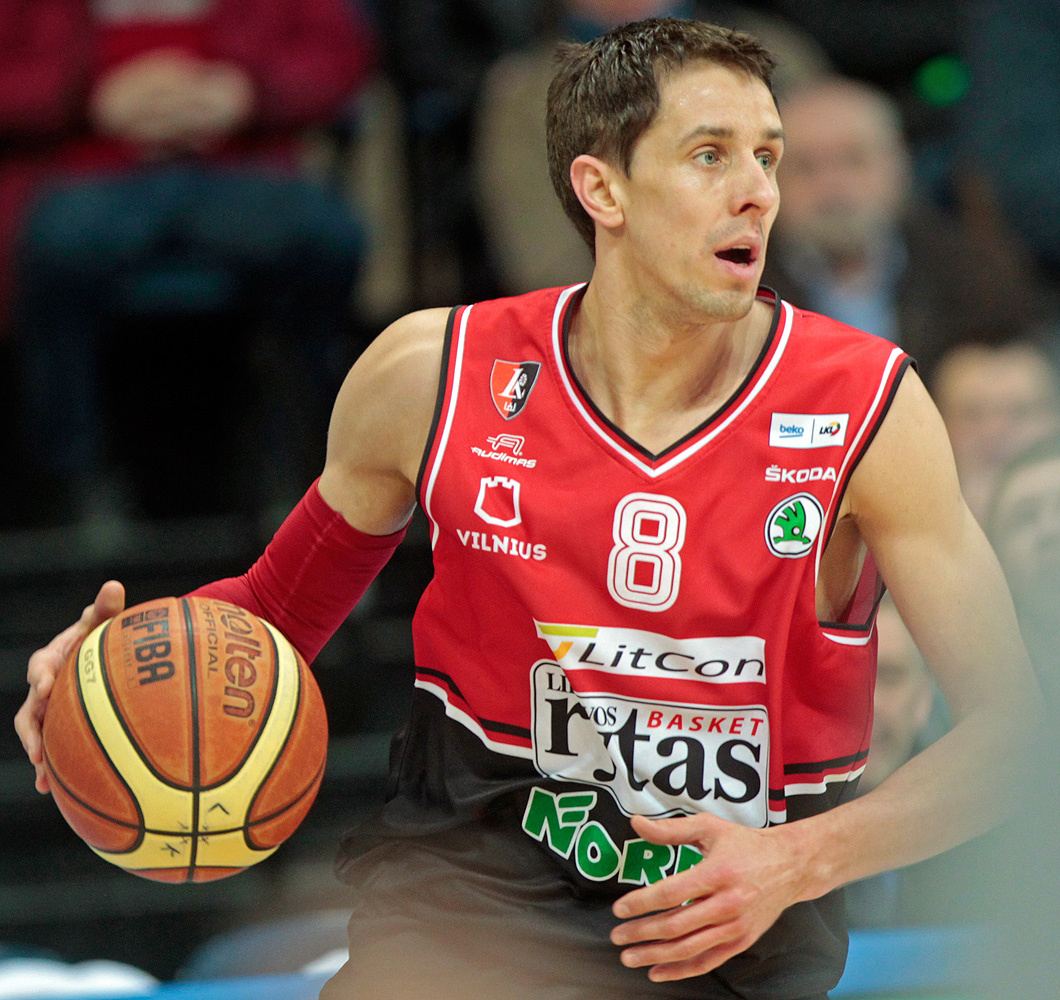
LKL all-time leading scorer Mindaugas Lukauskis played for BC Šiauliai in one of his last LKL seasons in 2020–2021

Over the next to seasons, 2018-2019 and 2019–2020, Šiauliai did not have the same amounts of success. Team leaders like Birutis, Sabeckis and Zeisloft left the team. Šiauliai finished last in 2019, though did improve in 2020, finishing in 8th place. Many players, like Karolis Lukošiūnas, Ignas Vaitkus, Rokas Gustys and Evaldas Šaulys, moved on to top teams in the LKL after successful individual seasons with Šiauliai. In the 2020–2021 season, Šiauliai, led by LKL season MVP Elvar Már Friðriksson, Andy Van Vliet, Arminas Urbutis, Kaspars Bērziņš, Martynas Varnas and veteran Mindaugas Lukauskis, finished 7th in the LKL. Friðriksson in particular had many great performances for Šiauliai.

The 2021–2022 season was the return among the LKL elite for Šiauliai. Coach Sireika remained with the team, and the team, led by Jon Elmore, managed to reach the LKL semifinals for the first time since the 2011–2012 season, by defeating CBet Jonava 3–1 in the first round of the LKL playoffs. In the semifinals, Šiauliai lost to Rytas Vilnius 1–3, but not before giving the best fight they can to the team that later won the LKL championship. Playing in the bronze medal series, Šiauliai faced Žalgiris Kaunas, who missed the LKL finals for the first time in LKL history, and lost the series 0–4. Šiauliai also reached the semifinals of the King Mindaugas Cup for the first time since the 2014–2015 season, beating the heavily favored BC Juventus team coached by long time player of Šiauliai, Žydrūnas Urbonas, in the quarterfinals, and was runner-up in the newly established 2021–22 European North Basketball League, where Šiauliai lost to Anwil Włocławek in the finals.

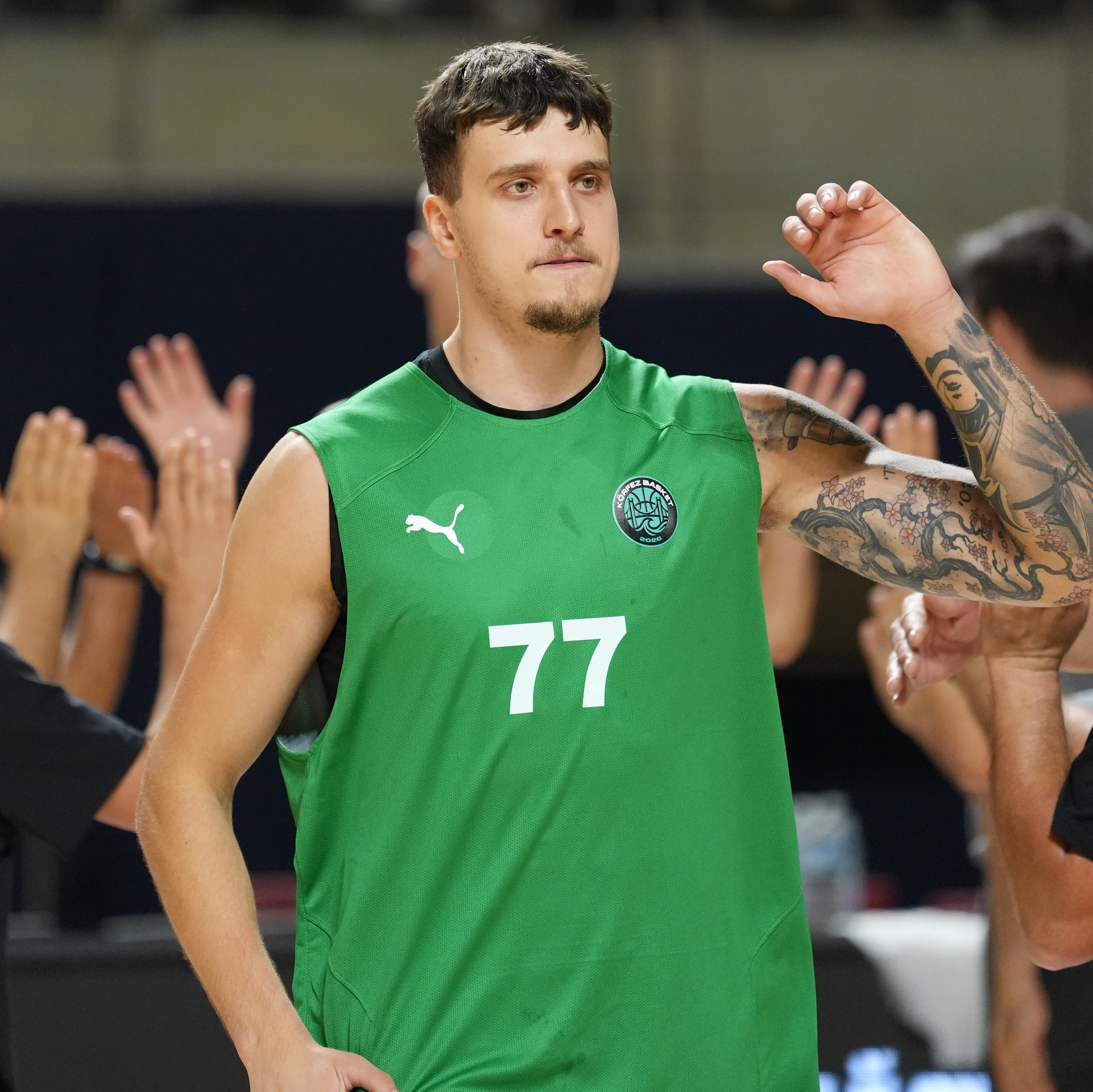
Local Paulius Danusevičius played for BC Šiauliai in 2020–2024 and was one of its leaders in 2022–2024

Because of the successful previous season, fans had higher hopes for the 2022–2023 season. Šiauliai had earned a spot in the qualifying tournament for the 2022–23 Basketball Champions League season. While some top players for the team, like Giedrius Staniulis, Issuf Sanon, and in particular Elmore, left during the summer, for bigger deals elsewhere, Šiauliai retained much of the same roster and signed Kyle Mangas to replace Elmore. Despite higher hopes from fans, Šiauliai were unable to achieve any kind of success during the season - Šiauliai lost in the first round of the Basketball Champions League, to Heroes Den Bosch. Finalists of the previous season, Šiauliai, only finished 6th in their group in the 2022–23 European North Basketball League tournament, far away from playoff contention. In the King Mindaugas Cup, Šiauliai reached and were quickly beaten in the play-in stage by BC Juventus. For much of the LKL season, Šiauliai contended for the playoffs, but an injury to team leader Martynas Varnas resulted in Šiauliai falling in the standings, with no one really replacing Varnas, and on the final day of the regular season, Šiauliai faced BC Nevėžis for the final spot in the LKL playoffs - Šiauliai lost the match, and just one year after playing in the LKL semifinals, finished the season in disappointing 9th place - out of the LKL playoffs entirely. Most of the newer players were unable to replace the previous season leaders, and much of the remaining roster didn't have better seasons and as a result, Šiauliai struggled all year. Coach Sireika, who had coached Šiauliai for a total of 18 seasons, retired soon after.

=== 2023–present ===
European champion and former NBA player, coach Darius Songaila started coaching BC Šiauliai in 2025

With Sireika's retirement, Šiauliai signed Nikolajs Mazurs as the new head coach for the team. Šiauliai changed up much of the roster for the team, with newcomer point guard L.J. Thorpe being the most significant of the signings during the summer, while Varnas departed Šiauliai to sign with 7-Bet Lietkabelis. Under Mazurs, Šiauliai had one of the worst starts in club history, starting just 2–12 in the LKL, in last place. In December, after losing the last 11 out of 12 games, Šiauliai brought in former long time player Žydrūnas Urbonas as the new head coach for the team. Šiauliai, under Urbonas, avoided relegation in the LKL, with a 10th-place finish, and had actually returned to brief playoff contention. In the King Mindaugas Cup, Šiauliai upset CBet Jonava in the quarterfinals, to qualify for the Final Four tournament - and while finishing fourth, still earning praise for their efforts, as they took BC Žalgiris in the semifinals, and BC Rytas in the bronze medal game to the limit. In the 2023-24 European North Basketball League, Šiauliai finished surprisingly first the group stage, beat the Bristol Flyers in the quarterfinals, and qualified to the Final Four competition, as an upset - Urbonas former team, BC Juventus, a heavy favorite of the competition, were surprisingly eliminated in the quarterfinals while Šiauliai went all the way, with a respectable fourth-place finish. L.J. Thorpe led the team in scoring, while center Tomaš Pavelka led the team in rebounds and blocks, while Paulius Danusevičius, Eimantas Stankevičius and Daniel Baslyk all had their best seasons with Šiauliai. During the season, for brief spells, former Juventus and Lietkabelis player Jon Davis, who had a couple of game deciding clutch shots in both the LKL and the ENBL competitions, former Labas-Gas Prienai player Shaquille Keith and former longtime Neptūnas and CBet Jonava player Nojus Mineikis also had memorable moments for Šiauliai.

For the 2024–2025 season, Šiauliai had high expectations. Šiauliai rebuilt the team, with Thorpe and Danusevičius, both leaders, leaving, and signed Shaq Buchanan, Gerry Blakes, Lukas Uleckas, Tauras Jogėla, Mindaugas Kupšas, Saulius Kulvietis and Marius Valinskas - all big names in the LKL, and all were leaders for Šiauliai during the season. While Šiauliai did return to the LKL playoffs, constant roster changes and poor defense resulted in just a disappointing 7th-place finish. Coach Urbonas left Šiauliai just before the LKL playoffs, amid rumors of conflicts within the team and its main sponsors, and was replaced by assistant coach and former longtime Šiauliai player Darius Pakamanis. Rytas Vilnius beat Šiauliai in the LKL playoffs, with a dominating 2–0 sweep.

== Players ==
=== Retired numbers ===
BC Šiauliai has three retired numbers of players who had significant influence in the team's results previously.

BC Šiauliai retired numbers
No.	Nat.	Player	Position	Tenure
5	(Lithuania)	Mindaugas Žukauskas	SF, PF	1995–97, 2009–12
12	(Lithuania)	Donatas Slanina	G	1993–1999
13	(Lithuania)	Robertas Giedraitis	PG	1995–2005
HC	(Lithuania)	Antanas Sireika	Head coach	1995–02, 2008–12, 2017–23
12	(Lithuania)	Vaidas Pauliukėnas	SG, SF	1999–08, 2009–11

=== Current roster ===
Note: Flags indicate national team eligibility at FIBA-sanctioned events. Players may hold other non-FIBA nationalities not displayed.

BC Šiauliai roster
Players
Coaches

Pos.	No.	Nat.	Name	Ht.	Wt.	Age
G/F	2	(United States)	Henderson Jr., Cedric	1.98 m (6 ft 6 in)	91 kg (201 lb)	26 – 3 March 2000
G	7	(Switzerland)	Fofana, Selim	1.93 m (6 ft 4 in)	78 kg (172 lb)	27 – 8 July 1999
SF	8	(United States)	Nicholson, Kassim	2.01 m (6 ft 7 in)	91 kg (201 lb)	27 – 28 May 1999
C	9	(Lithuania)	Pacevičius, Martynas	2.05 m (6 ft 9 in)	106 kg (234 lb)	29 – 19 July 1997
C	15	(United States)	Reid, Efton	2.13 m (7 ft 0 in)	109 kg (240 lb)	24 – 3 February 2002
G/F	16	(Lithuania)	Lukošiūnas, Karolis	1.95 m (6 ft 5 in)	90 kg (198 lb)	29 – 4 August 1997
F	17	(Lithuania)	Jarumbauskas, Simas	1.98 m (6 ft 6 in)	102 kg (225 lb)	26 – 1 July 2000
PG	20	(United States)	McKnight, Dayvion	1.83 m (6 ft 0 in)	86 kg (190 lb)	24 – 2 July 2002
F/C	21	(Lithuania)	Venskus, Erikas	2.05 m (6 ft 9 in)	100 kg (220 lb)	26 – 28 May 2000
F	22	(Lithuania)	Jogėla, Tauras	2.03 m (6 ft 8 in)	100 kg (220 lb)	33 – 2 May 1993
F/C	25	(Lithuania)	Romančenko, Dovydas	2.06 m (6 ft 9 in)	100 kg (220 lb)	28 – 1 June 1998
PG	55	(United States)	Caffey, Mike	1.83 m (6 ft 0 in)	79 kg (174 lb)	33 – 17 February 1993
G/F	77	(Lithuania)	Čivilis, Rokas	1.95 m (6 ft 5 in)	88 kg (194 lb)	21 – 23 October 2005

Head coach

- (Lithuania) Darius Songaila

Assistant coach(es)

- (United States) Willis Hall
- (Lithuania) Virginijus Sirvydis

Athletic trainer(s)

- (Lithuania) Nerijus Naglys

Physiotherapist(s)

- (Lithuania) Modestas Baltrūnas

Doctor(s)

- (Lithuania) Evaldas Kaulinis

Legend

- (C) Team captain
- Injured

- Roster
Updated: September 27, 2026

=== Depth chart ===
Pos.	Starting 5	Bench 1	Reserve
C	Martynas Pacevičius	Efton Reid
PF	Tauras Jogėla	Dovydas Romančenko	Erikas Venskus
SF	Cedric Henderson Jr.	Simas Jarumbauskas	Kassim Nicholson
SG	Selim Fofana	Karolis Lukošiūnas	Rokas Čivilis
PG	Dayvion McKnight

=== Squad changes for/during the 2026–27 season ===
==== In ====
No.	Pos.	Nat.	Name	Moving from	
9	C	(Lithuania)	Martynas Pacevičius	Neptūnas Klaipėda	(Lithuania)
15	C	(United States)	Efton Reid	Stal Ostrów Wielkopolski	(Poland)
16	G/F	(Lithuania)	Karolis Lukošiūnas	London Lions	(United Kingdom)
17	F	(Lithuania)	Simas Jarumbauskas	BC Vienna	(Austria)
21	F/C	(Lithuania)	Erikas Venskus	Juventus Utena	(Lithuania)
22	F	(Lithuania)	Tauras Jogėla	Górnik Wałbrzych	(Poland)
55	PG	(United States)	Mike Caffey	CSO Voluntari	(Romania)
	SF	(United States)	Kassim Nicholson	Rostock Seawolves	(Germany)

==== Out ====
No.	Pos.	Nat.	Name	Moving to	
3	G/F	(United States)	Cassius Stanley	Free agent	
4	C	(United States)	Tre-Vaughn Minott	Köping Basket	(Sweden)
8	G	(Lithuania)	Vaidas Kariniauskas	BC Tauragė	(Lithuania)
9	F	(Lithuania)	Daniel Baslyk	Lietkabelis Panevežys	(Lithuania)
11	F	(Estonia)	Siim-Sander Vene	Derthona Basket	(Italy)
14	F/C	(Lithuania)	Oskaras Pleikys	Rytas Vilnius	(Lithuania)
30	C	(Bosnia and Herzegovina)	Stefan Simanić	Free agent	
99	G	(Lithuania)	Marius Valinskas	Lietkabelis Panevežys	(Lithuania)

== Historic logos ==
Šiauliai classic logo (1994–2012)

Šiauliai new logo (2012–2019)

25th anniversary logo (2019)

20-21 Šiauliai logo (2020)

Šiauliai–7bet logo (2021–2022)

== Season by season ==
Robertas Javtokas shortly played for Šiauliai in his career beginning.

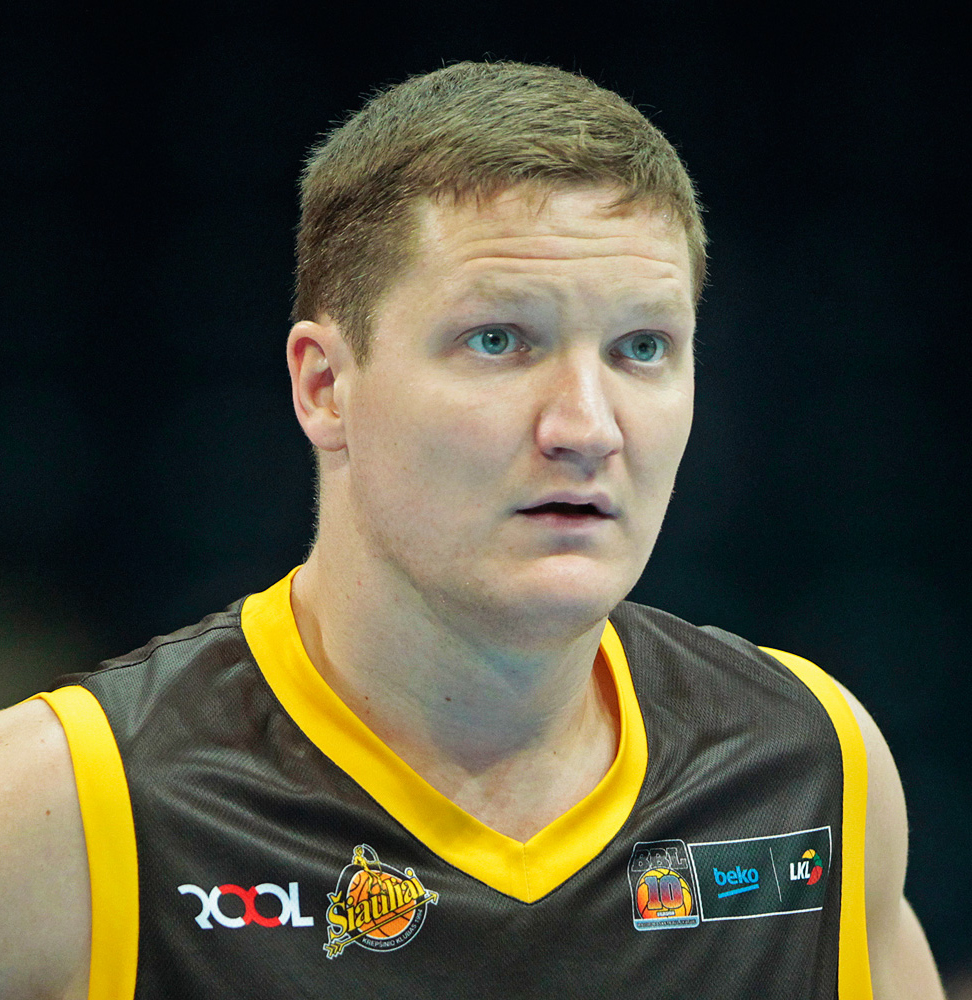
Vytautas Šulskis as a member of BC Šiauliai in 2015.

Season	League	Pos.	Regional competitions		LKF Cup King Mindaugas Cup	European Competitions	
1994–95	LKL	4th					
1995–96	LKL	8th				3 Korać Cup	R32
1996–97	LKL	4th				3 Korać Cup	PR
1997–98	LKL	7th			Runner-up	3 Korać Cup	R32
1998–99	LKL	4th				3 Korać Cup	R16
1999–00	LKL	3rd				3 Korać Cup	R32
2000–01	LKL	3rd	NEBL	RS			
2001–02	LKL	4th	NEBL	RS			
2002–03	LKL	4th				3 FIBA Champions' Cup	QR
2003–04	LKL	3rd				4 FIBA Europe Cup	QR
2004–05	LKL	3rd	BBL Elite Division	3rd		4 FIBA Europe Cup	CS
2005–06	LKL	3rd	BBL Elite Division	3rd		3 FIBA EuroCup	RS
2006–07	LKL	3rd	BBL Elite Division	4th	Fourth qualified	3 FIBA EuroCup	L16
2007–08	LKL	3rd	BBL Elite Division	5th	Third qualified	2 ULEB Cup	RS
2008–09	LKL	3rd	BBL Elite Division	5th	Third qualified	3 EuroChallenge	RS
2009–10	LKL	3rd	BBL Elite Division	3rd	Third qualified	2 Eurocup	RS
2010–11	LKL	5th	BBL Elite Division	7th	Quarterfinalist	2 Eurocup	RS
2011–12	LKL	4th	BBL Elite Division	4th	Third round		
2012–13	LKL	6th	BBL Quarterfinalist		Semifinalist		
2013–14	LKL	6th	BBL Champion		Fifth round		
2014–15	LKL	7th	BBL Champion		Third place	3 EuroChallenge	RS
2015–16	LKL	6th	BBL Champion		Quarterfinalist	3 FIBA Europe Cup	RS
2016–17	LKL	10th				4 FIBA Europe Cup	RS
2017–18	LKL	5th	BBL Semifinalist		Quarterfinalist		
2018–19	LKL	10th			Quarterfinalist	3 Champions League	QR1
2019–20	LKL	8th			Quarterfinalist		
2020–21	LKL	7th			Quarterfinalist		
2021–22	LKL	4th	ENBL	2nd	Fourth place		
2022–23	LKL	9th	ENBL	RS	First round	3 Champions League	QR
2023–24	LKL	10th	ENBL	4th	Fourth place		
2024–25	LKL	7th			Quarterfinals		
2025–26	LKL	6th			Quarterfinals		

Detailed information of former rosters and results.

== League attendances ==
This is a list of league games attendances of BC Šiauliai at Šiauliai Arena.

Season	Total	High	Low	Average
2014–15 LKL	28,905	4,500	450	1,376
2015–16 LKL	29,167	5,465	381	1,535
2016–17 LKL	24,340	2,800	300	1,352
2017–18 LKL	48,300	5,200	1,000	2,415
2018–19 LKL	34,490	3870	–	1,916
2019–20 LKL	22,120	3700	–	2,011
2020–21 LKL	1,559	106	–	82
2021–22 LKL	44,412	4,867	720	2,115
2022–23 LKL	28,007	5,037	991	1,750

== Head coaches ==
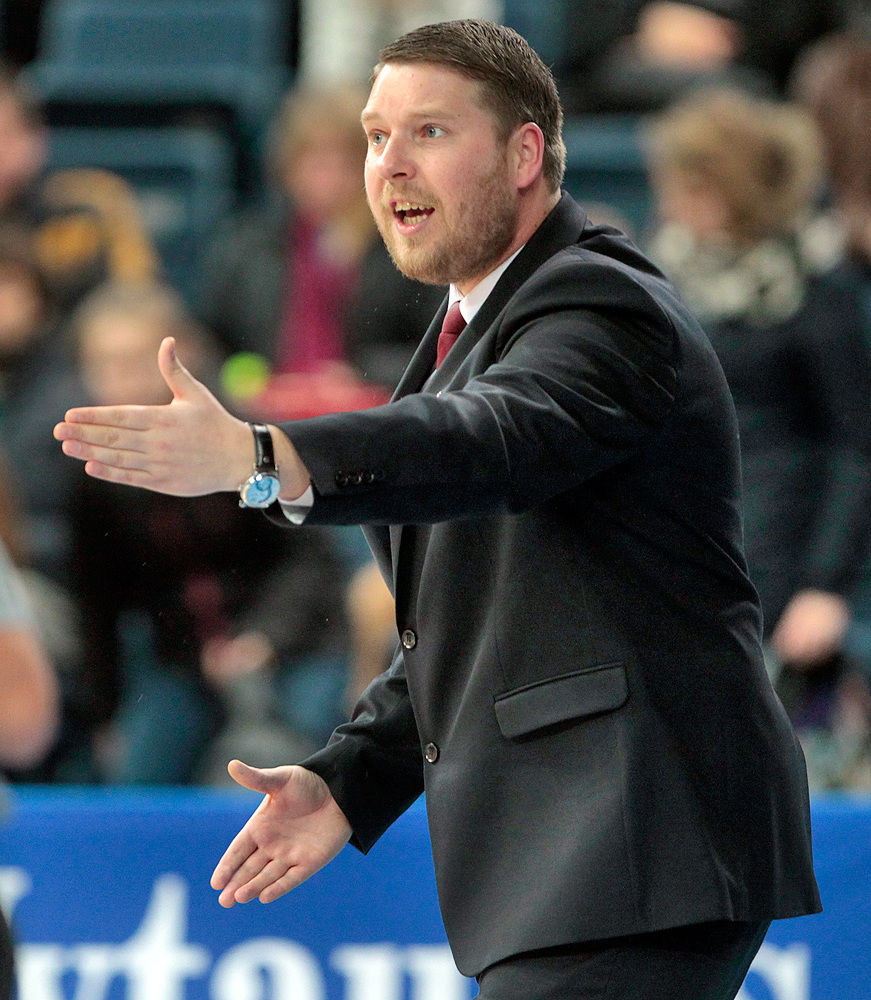
Gediminas Petrauskas coached BC Šiauliai to three consecutive BBL titles.

Nat.	Coach	Seasons	Tenure	W	L	T	Total	PCT
(Lithuania)	Antanas Sireika	20	1994–2002, 2009–2012, 2017–2023	470	450	0	920	51.09%
(Lithuania)	Adomas Klimavičius	1	2002–2003	21	15	0	36	58.33%
(Lithuania)	Ramūnas Butautas	2	2003–2005	58	48	0	106	54.72%
(Lithuania)	Aloyzas Rudys	2	2005–2007	63	51	0	114	55.26%
(Lithuania)	Robertas Kuncaitis	1	2007–2008	25	21	0	46	54.35%
(Lithuania)	Robertas Giedraitis	2	2007–2009	26	16	1	43	60.47%
(Lithuania)	Gediminas Petrauskas	4	2012–2016	124	97	1	222	55.86%
(Lithuania)	Vaidas Pauliukėnas	1	2016–2017	6	36	0	42	14.29%
(Latvia)	Nikolajs Mazurs	1	2023	8	13	0	21	38.1%
(Lithuania)	Žydrūnas Urbonas	2	2023–2025	34	41	0	75	45.33%

Last updated: May 12, 2025.

== Club players records ==
Player	Opponent	Result	Tournament	Type	Record	Season
Mindaugas Žukauskas	Atletas Kaunas	91–86	LKL	Points	45	1995–96
Vytautas Šarakauskas	Nevėžis Kėdainiai	80–73	LKL	Rebounds	17	2010–11
Vytautas Šarakauskas	Juventus Utena	94–105	LKL	Rebounds	17	2010–11
Audrius Danusevičius	Rujiena Valmiera	80–77	FIBA EuroCup	Rebounds	17	2003–04
Andrius Giedraitis	Dendi Basket Kiev	105–71	Korać Cup	Assists	14	1997–98
Robertas Giedraitis	Sakalai Vilnius	78–73	LKL	Steals	8	1994–95
Robertas Giedraitis	Statyba Vilnius	87–85	LKL	Steals	8	1996–97
Andrius Mažutis	Lac. Alus Valmiera	84–87	BBL	Steals	8	2006–07
Oleg Bulancev	NECA Kaunas	93–75	LKL	Blocks	5	1994–95
Oleg Bulancev	Šilutė	97–71	LKL	Blocks	5	1994–95
Michailas Anisimovas	Neptūnas Klaipėda	102–96	LKL	Blocks	5	2004–05
Oleg Bulancev	Neptūnas Klaipėda	104–72	LKL	Blocks	5	1997–98
Ovidijus Galdikas	Palanga	106–81	LKL	Blocks	5	2012–13
Denzel Bowles	Baltai Kaunas	83–87	LKL	Field goal	13	2011–12
Arvydas Tamkevičius	Statyba Vilnius	89–83	LKL	Field goal	13	1994–95
Mario Delaš	Nevėžis Kėdainiai	88–94	LKL	Field goal	13	2010–11
Arvydas Tamkevičius	NECA Kaunas	99–101	LKL	Field goal	13	1994–95
Tadas Klimavičius	Lac. Alus Valmiera	84–87	BBL	Field goal	13	2006–07
Nick Zeisloft	Juventus Utena	120–84	LKL	Three-pointers	12	2017–18
Žydrūnas Urbonas	Ventspils	80–103	FIBA Champions' Cup	Free throws	17	2002–03

Last updated: August 14, 2015.

== Notable players ==
To appear in this section a player must be either:

- A player who has played at least 3 seasons (if foreign player) or 5 seasons (if Lithuanian player) for the club.
- A player who has won individual award.
- A Lithuanian player who has played for the Lithuanian national basketball team.
- A foreign international player who had significantly contributed into the results of the club.
- A Lithuanian player who had significantly contributed into the results of the club.

- Lithuania:
  - (Lithuania) Martynas Andriukaitis 2003–2004
  - (Lithuania) Rolandas Alijevas 2012–2013, 2014–2015
  - (Lithuania) Sigitas Birutis 1994–2001
  - (Lithuania) Arvydas Čepulis 1997–2000, 2001–2005, 2006–2007, 2010, 2016-present
  - (Lithuania) Audrius Danusevičius 1997–1999, 2000–2002, 2003–2008, 2009
  - (Lithuania) Robertas Giedraitis 1994–2006
  - (Lithuania) Rokas Giedraitis 2013–2015
  - (Lithuania) Ovidijus Galdikas 2012–2014
  - (Lithuania) Deividas Gailius 2009–2010
  - (Lithuania) Andrius Giedraitis 1997
  - (Lithuania) Darius Gvezdauskas 2010–2012
  - (Lithuania) Julius Jucikas 2010–2015
  - (Lithuania) Robertas Javtokas 1996–1997
  - (Lithuania) Žygimantas Janavičius 2010–2011
  - (Lithuania) Artūras Jomantas 2004–2006, 2015–2016
  - (Lithuania) Aurimas Kieža 2006–2008, 2012–2013
  - (Lithuania) Saulius Kuzminskas 2001–2003, 2007–2009, 2012–2013
  - (Lithuania) Gintaras Kadžiulis 2008–2009
  - (Lithuania) Mindaugas Kuzminskas 2008–2010
  - (Lithuania) Tadas Klimavičius 2005–2007
  - (Lithuania) Gintaras Leonavičius 2014–2015
  - (Lithuania) Andrius Mažutis 2005–2007
  - (Lithuania) Rolandas Matulis 2002
  - (Lithuania) Gediminas Orelik 2006–2007, 2009–2010
  - (Lithuania) Giedrius Pečiulionis 1995–2001
  - (Lithuania) Vaidas Pauliukėnas 1999–2008, 2009–2010
  - (Lithuania) Virginijus Praškevičius 2007–2009
  - (Lithuania) Darius Pakamanis 2001–2006, 2006–2007, 2009, 2013–2014
  - (Lithuania) Edvinas Ruzgas 2010–2012
  - (Lithuania) Mantas Ruikis 2005–2008
  - (Lithuania) Donatas Slanina 1993–1999
  - (Lithuania) Laurynas Samėnas 2009–2010, 2012–2013
- Lithuania (cont):
  - (Lithuania) Vytautas Šulskis 2012–2015
  - (Lithuania) Vytautas Šarakauskas 2009–2012
  - (Lithuania) Gintautas Šivickas 1997
  - (Lithuania) Andrius Šležas 1996, 1998–1999, 2008–2009
  - (Lithuania) Arvydas Šikšnius 2009–2010, 2011–2012
  - (Lithuania) Arvydas Tamkevičius 1994–1999
  - (Lithuania) Žydrūnas Urbonas 1999–2001, 2002–2003, 2004–2005
  - (Lithuania) Andrius Vyšniauskas 1999–2000, 2002–2003
  - (Lithuania) Rolandas Vaičiūnas 1998–2008
  - (Lithuania) Valdas Vasylius 2011–2012
  - (Lithuania) Donatas Zavackas 2007–2008
  - (Lithuania) Mindaugas Žukauskas 1994–1998, 2009–2012
  - (Lithuania) Eurelijus Žukauskas 1996
  - (Lithuania) Laurynas Birutis 2017–2018
- USA:
  - (United States) Jeff Allen 2014–2015
  - (United States) Rashaun Broadus 2010–2012
  - (United States) Denzel Bowles 2011–2012
  - (United States) Brandon Brown 2009–2010
  - (United States) Chris Cooper 2013–2014
  - (United States) Stefhon Hannah 2008–2009
  - (United States) Cameron Long 2011–2012
  - (United States) Travis Leslie 2014
  - (United States) Derrick Low 2009–2010
  - (United States) Derek Needham 2013–2014
  - (United States) Bambale Osby 2014
  - (United States) Chase Simon 2012–2013
  - (United States) David Weaver 2010–2011
  - (United States) Jon Davis 2023
- Belgium:
  - (Belgium) Andy Van Vliet 2020–2021
- Ukraine:
  - (Ukraine) (Lithuania) Michailas Anisimovas 2003–2005
  - (Ukraine) Roman Gumenyuk 2010–2012, 2015–2016
- Croatia:
  - (Croatia) Mario Delaš 2010–2011
- Latvia:
  - (Latvia) Raitis Grafs 2009–2010, 2012
- Egypt:
  - (Egypt) Assem Marei 2015–2016
- Iceland:
  - (Iceland) Elvar Friðriksson 2020–2021

Detailed former players information.
