= LKL All-Star Game =

- Status: Inactive
- Inaugurated: 1994
- Most recent: 2015
- Organizer: Lithuanian Basketball League

The LKL All-Star Game is the All-Star Game of the professional Lithuanian Basketball League (LKL). The game is held once every year. The participants of the game are chosen in two ways: the first is via fan ballot, with the leading vote recipients at each position starting the game; secondly the reserves are chosen by a vote among the head coaches of each squad. Coaches are not allowed to vote for their own players. If a player is injured, and cannot participate, the league's commissioner will select a replacement.

== Features ==
The All-Star Game is played under normal FIBA rules, but there are notable differences from an average game.

The player introductions are usually accompanied by a significant amount of fanfare, including lighting effects, dance music, and pyrotechnics. Special uniforms are designed for the game each year, usually green for the Lithuanians, and white for the Time Team (non Lithuanians). A major recording artist typically sings the national anthem, prior to tip-off.

Game play usually involves players attempting spectacular slam dunks and alley oops. Defensive effort is limited, and the final score of the game is generally much higher than an average LKL game. The coaches also try to give most of the reserve players some playing time on the court, instead of using a limited rotation, as they would in a normal game. The fourth quarter of the game is often played in a more competitive fashion, if the game is close.

Halftime is also longer than a typical LKL game, due to musical performances, by various artists.

Every few years, LKL alternates matches from Lietuviai and Time Team (Lietuviai being the All-Star Lithuanian team, and Time Team being the All-Star foreigner team) to Vilkai and Ereliai (two teams of mixed foreign and Lithuanian players).

== Results ==
Summaries
Year	(Arena), city	Result			MVP
Year	(Arena), city	Champion	Score	Runner-up	MVP
1994	Panevėžys	(United Nations) Rytai	99–88	(United Nations) Vakarai	(Lithuania) Gintaras Bačianskas (Lietkabelis)
1995	Šiauliai	(Lithuania) Lietuviai	100–91	(Europe) Time Team	(Lithuania) Saulius Štombergas (LSU-Atletas), (United States) Patrick Jones (BC Olimpas)
1996	Vilnius	(Lithuania) Lietuviai	83–81	(Europe) Time Team	(Lithuania) Rimas Kurtinaitis (BC Žalgiris)
1997	(Kaunas Sports Hall), Kaunas	(United Nations) Vakarai	108–107	(United Nations) Rytai	(Lithuania) Tomas Pačėsas (Alytus Alita-Savy)
1998	Vilnius	(United Nations) Rytai	100–85	(United Nations) Vakarai	(United States) Dion Cross (Šilutė "Šilutė")
1999	(Kaunas Sports Hall), Kaunas	LKL Rinktinė	106-101	Žalgiris	(Lithuania) Valdemaras Chomičius (Kraitenė Marijampolė)
2000	(Kaunas Sports Hall), Kaunas	(Lithuania) Lietuviai	137–97	(Europe) Time Team	(Lithuania) Mindaugas Timinskas (BC Žalgiris)
2001	(Kaunas Sports Hall), Kaunas	(United Nations) Vilkai	124–120	(United Nations) Ereliai	(Ukraine) Grigorij Khizhnyak (BC Žalgiris)
2002	(Kaunas Sports Hall), Kaunas	(United Nations) Ereliai	125–117	(United Nations) Vilkai	(Lithuania) Robertas Javtokas (Lietuvos Rytas)
2003	(Kaunas Sports Hall), Kaunas	(United Nations) Vilkai	105–97	(United Nations) Ereliai	(Lithuania) Arvydas Macijauskas (Lietuvos Rytas)
2004	(Kaunas Sports Hall), Kaunas	(Lithuania) Lietuviai	131–113	(Europe) Time Team	(United States) Tanoka Beard (BC Žalgiris)
2005	(Siemens Arena), Vilnius	(Europe) Time Team	86–74	(Lithuania) Lietuviai	(United States) Tanoka Beard (BC Žalgiris)
2006	(Siemens Arena), Vilnius	(Lithuania) Lietuviai	107–88	(Europe) Time Team	(Lithuania) Simas Jasaitis (Lietuvos Rytas)
2007	(Siemens Arena), Vilnius	(Lithuania) Lietuviai	108–108	(Europe) Time Team	(Lithuania) Jonas Mačiulis (BC Žalgiris), (United States) Kareem Rush (Lietuvos Rytas)
2008	(Šiauliai Arena), Šiauliai	(Lithuania) Lietuviai	110–109	(Europe) Time Team	(United States) Hollis Price (Lietuvos Rytas)
2009	(Kaunas Sports Hall), Kaunas	(United Nations) Vilkai	130–122	(United Nations) Ereliai	(United States) Chuck Eidson (Lietuvos Rytas)
2010	(Cido Arena), Panevėžys	(United Nations) Vilkai	109–104	(United Nations) Ereliai	(Lithuania) Mindaugas Kuzminskas (BC Šiauliai)
2011	(Šiauliai Arena), Šiauliai	(Lithuania) Lietuviai	122–114	(Europe) Time Team	(Lithuania) Jonas Valančiūnas (Lietuvos Rytas)
2012	(Švyturys Arena), Klaipėda	(Lithuania) Lietuviai	115–100	(Europe) Time Team	(Lithuania) Jonas Valančiūnas (Lietuvos Rytas)
2013	(Šiauliai Arena), Šiauliai	(Lithuania) Lietuviai	140–113	(Europe) Time Team	(Lithuania) Kšyštof Lavrinovič, Darjuš Lavrinovič (Žalgiris)
2014	(Švyturys Arena), Klaipėda	(United Nations) Vakarai	113–108	(United Nations) Rytai	(United States) Justin Dentmon (Žalgiris)
2015	(Siemens Arena), Vilnius	(United Nations) Amžini Priešininkai	105–95	(United Nations) LKL Žvaigždės	(United States) Travis Leslie (Lietuvos rytas)
2016	(Siemens Arena), Vilnius	Replaced by Karaliaus Mindaugo taurė			

== Other events ==
The All-Star Game is the featured event of the All-Star Day, which also includes a number of popular exhibition games, and competitions featuring LKL players. It includes the:

- LKL Three-point Shootout
- LKL Slam Dunk Contest

== Players with most appearances ==
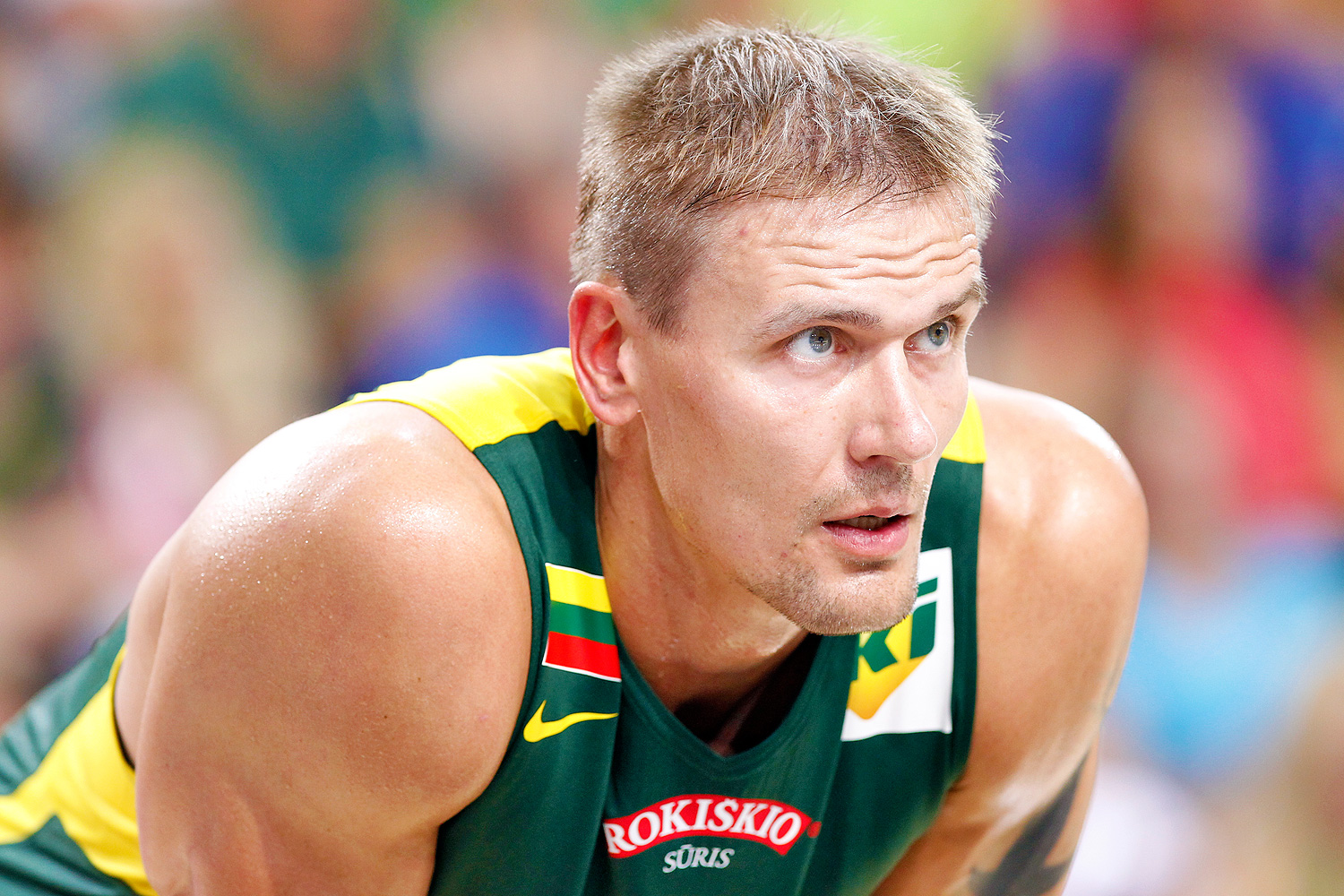
Robertas Javtokas was selected 6 times.

Player	All-Star	Editions	Notes
(Lithuania) Paulius Jankūnas	6	2004, 2006, 2007, 2009, 2011 and 2012	
(Lithuania) Robertas Javtokas	6	2001, 2002, 2004, 2005, 2006 and 2012	1x MVP
(United States) Tanoka Beard	5	2003, 2004, 2005, 2006 and 2007	2x MVP
(Lithuania) Saulius Stombergas	5	1995, 1996, 1998, 1999, 2003	1x MVP
(Lithuania) Eurelijus Žukauskas	5	1996, 1999, 2007, 2008 and 2009	
(Lithuania) Dainius Šalenga	4	2002, 2004, 2005 and 2010	
(Lithuania) Ramūnas Šiškauskas	4	2001, 2002, 2003, 2004	
(Lithuania) Mindaugas Kuzminskas	4	2010, 2011, 2012, 2013	1x MVP
(Lithuania) Jonas Valančiūnas	3	2010, 2011 and 2012	2x MVP
(Lithuania) Vidas Ginevičius	3	2002, 2005, 2006	
(Lithuania) Arvydas Macijauskas	3	2001, 2002 and 2003	1x MVP
(Lithuania) Jonas Mačiulis	3	2007, 2008, 2009	1x MVP
(Lithuania) Donatas Slanina	3	1999, 2001 and 2002	
(Lithuania) Rolandas Matulis	2	2001, 2011	
(Lithuania) Mindaugas Timinskas	2	2003, 2004	
(Lithuania) Kšyštof Lavrinovič	2	2013, 2015	1x MVP
(Lithuania) Saulius Kuzminskas	2	2002, 2003	
(Lithuania) Simonas Serapinas	2	2003, 2005	
(Lithuania) Artūras Jomantas	2	2005, 2014	
(Lithuania) Martynas Pocius	2	2010, 2011	
(Lithuania) Mario Delaš	2	2012 and 2013	
(Lithuania) Gintaras Kadžiulis	2	2002 and 2012	
(Lithuania) Simas Jasaitis	2	2006 and 2011	1x MVP
(Ukraine) Grigorij Khizhnyak	2	2001 and 2002	1x MVP
(United States) Chuck Eidson	2	2008 and 2009	1x MVP
(United States) Travis Leslie	2	2014 and 2015	1x MVP

== Distinctions ==
=== FIBA Hall of Fame ===
- (Lithuania) Arvydas Sabonis

=== Basketball Hall of Fame ===
- (Lithuania) Arvydas Sabonis

=== FIBA's 50 Greatest Players (1991) ===
- (Lithuania) Arvydas Sabonis

=== EuroLeague Hall of Fame ===
- (Lithuania) Ramūnas Šiškauskas
- (Lithuania) Sarunas Jasikevicius

== See also ==
- LKL All-Star Day
- LKL All-Star Game MVP

== Sources ==
- History
- MVPs on Eurobasket
