= Derrick Low =

American former professional basketball player (born 1986)

Personal information
- Born: March 21, 1986 (age 38); Honolulu, Hawaii, U.S.
- Listed height: 6 ft 2 in (1.88 m)
- Listed weight: 195 lb (88 kg)

Career information
- High school: ʻIolani School (Honolulu, Hawaii)
- College: Washington State (2004–2008)
- NBA draft: 2008: undrafted
- Playing career: 2008–2017
- Position: Point guard

Career history
- 2008: Sydney Spirit
- 2009: SPO Rouen Basket
- 2009–2010: Šiauliai
- 2010–2011: Maccabi Haifa
- 2011–2013: Dnipro
- 2013: Azovmash
- 2014: Selçuk Üniversitesi
- 2015–2017: Pieno žvaigždės

Career highlights and awards
- Lithuanian League top scorer (2016); Lithuanian League All-Star (2010); 2× LKL Three-point Shootout champion (2010, 2016); First-team All-Pac-10 (2007); Third-team All-Pac-10 (2008)

Derrick Low (born March 21, 1986) is an American former professional basketball player. He played college basketball for the Washington State Cougars.

== Professional career ==
After college, Low was not selected at the 2008 NBA draft.

In July 2008, he signed with the Sydney Spirit of Australia's National Basketball League. On January 5, 2009, he left Sydney and signed with the French club SPO Rouen Basket for the rest of the season.

On September 4, 2009, he signed a one-year contract with the Lithuanian club Šiauliai.

On July 20, 2010, he signed a one-year contract with the Israeli club Maccabi Haifa.

On September 24, 2011, he signed a one-year contract with the Ukrainian club BC Dnipro. On May 16, 2015, he re-signed with Dnipro for one more season.

On June 16, 2013, he signed a one-year deal with the Ukrainian club Azovmash. On December 26, 2013, he parted ways with Azovmash. On January 3, 2014, he signed with Selçuk Üniversitesi BK of Turkey for the rest of the season.

On July 12, 2015, Low signed with the Romanian club Timișoara. However, he left Timișoara before appearing in a game for them. On December 9, 2015, he signed with the Lithuanian club Pieno žvaigždės for the rest of the season. On August 16, 2016, he re-signed with Pieno žvaigždės for one more season.

In April 2017, Low failed doping test, taken by Lithuanian Anti-Doping Agency. Low admitted taking the substances and disqualification of 20 months was assigned by FIBA.
