= Kareem Rush =

American basketball player (born 1980)

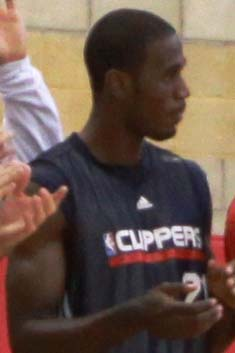
- Rush with the Los Angeles Clippers in 2009

Personal information
- Born: October 30, 1980 (age 46) Kansas City, Missouri, U.S.
- Listed height: 6 ft 6 in (1.98 m)
- Listed weight: 215 lb (98 kg)

Career information
- High school: Pembroke Hill (Kansas City, Missouri)
- College: Missouri (1999–2002)
- NBA draft: 2002: 1st round, 20th overall pick
- Drafted by: Toronto Raptors
- Playing career: 2002–2018
- Position: Shooting guard
- Number: 21, 4

Career history
- 2002–2004: Los Angeles Lakers
- 2004–2006: Charlotte Bobcats
- 2006–2007: Lietuvos rytas
- 2007–2008: Indiana Pacers
- 2008–2009: Philadelphia 76ers
- 2009–2010: Los Angeles Clippers
- 2012: Los Angeles D-Fenders
- 2012–2013: Los Angeles Slam
- 2013–2014: Los Angeles D-Fenders
- 2018: Kansas City Tornados

Career highlights
- LKL All-Star (2007); LKL All-Star Game Co-MVP (2007); Baltic Basketball League champion (2007); Baltic Basketball League Final Four MVP (2007); Fourth-team Parade All-American (1999); Mr. Show-Me Basketball (1999)

Career NBA statistics
- Points: 2,213 (6.4 ppg)
- Rebounds: 572 (1.7 rpg)
- Assists: 353 (1.0 apg)
- Stats at NBA.com
- Stats at Basketball Reference

Kareem Lamar Rush (born October 30, 1980) is an American former professional basketball player, who played for five National Basketball Association (NBA) franchises between 2002 and 2010, as well as other leagues in the U.S. and abroad. Rush's younger brother, Brandon, last played for the Minnesota Timberwolves, while older brother JaRon played college basketball for UCLA.

== College career ==
After graduating from Pembroke Hill School in Kansas City, Rush attended the University of Missouri in Columbia, Missouri, where he was a standout guard on the basketball team. Rush averaged 19.8 points per game as a junior, leading the Tigers to the Western Regional finals in the NCAA tournament, where they lost to Oklahoma. As a sophomore in 2000–01, he led the Big 12 in scoring, averaging 21.1 points per game. During this time, Rush worked with world-renowned conditioning coach Istvan Javorek.

== Professional career ==
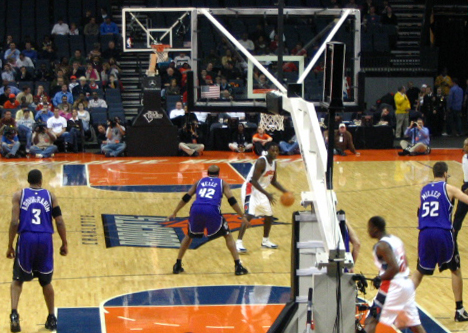
Rush handling the ball for the Charlotte Bobcats

=== Los Angeles Lakers (2002–2004) ===
Rush entered the 2002 NBA draft after his junior season and was selected with the 20th pick overall by the Toronto Raptors, who immediately traded his rights to the Los Angeles Lakers. Rush was projected to be a top 10 pick, but much like what happened to Kareem's elder brother JaRon—a former UCLA star—Kareem slipped down much further than anticipated. At the 2000 draft, JaRon, who left the Bruins after his sophomore season, was not selected. "No one wants to see something like that happen to his brother", JaRon said, weeping. "I mean, I knew he was going to get drafted eventually, but it was still hard."

Over his first two seasons, he played a limited, back-up role on the Shaquille O'Neal and Kobe Bryant-led club. However, due to his three-point shooting accuracy, he would become a more frequently used reserve player in the 2003–2004 playoffs for coach Phil Jackson. Although the Lakers would lose to the Pistons in the NBA Finals, Rush was able to make somewhat of a name for himself as a sharpshooter, averaging 14 minutes per game and hitting 40% of his three-point shots in the playoffs. He was a major contributor in helping the Lakers clinch the Western Conference Finals against Kevin Garnett and the Minnesota Timberwolves, when he scored 18 points in the sixth and final game, all from 3-point range, where he was 6 for 7.

=== Charlotte Bobcats (2004–2006) ===
Fourteen games into the 2004–05 season, the Lakers traded Rush to the Charlotte Bobcats for two future second-round draft picks. In Charlotte, Rush found a larger role, often starting and averaging more than 25 minutes and 11.5 points per game. He set a then-Bobcats franchise record by scoring 35 points against the Indiana Pacers. His season ended March 2 when he strained his MCL during a game in New Orleans.

=== Seattle SuperSonics (2006) ===
During the 2006–07 offseason, Rush signed with the Seattle SuperSonics, but recovered slowly from a groin injury. In November 2006, the club waived him to make room for a replacement for two frontcourt players who had sustained injuries.

=== Lithuania (2006–2007) ===
Rush spent the next season playing in Lithuania. On December 21, 2006, he signed with ULEB Cup participant Lietuvos rytas from Vilnius. He was chosen by the Slovenian coach Zmago Sagadin and led his team to the cup final. On February 24, 2007, Rush was named the MVP of the 2007 LKL All-Star Game. On April 21, Rush's team became the champion of the Baltic Basketball League; he was named the Final Four MVP.

=== Indiana Pacers (2007–2008) ===
On July 3, 2007, Rush signed with the Indiana Pacers, who cited their need for a shooter.

=== Philadelphia 76ers (2008–2009) ===
On July 28, 2008, Rush signed a deal with the Philadelphia 76ers.

=== Los Angeles Clippers (2009–2010) ===
Rush eventually signed for the Los Angeles Clippers, because of injuries to other players on the roster. However, Rush himself suffered an ACL tear in his right knee on November 18, 2009. The day before his ACL tear would end up being his final NBA game ever. On November 17, 2009, the Clippers would lose to the New Orleans Hornets 102 - 110 with Rush only playing for less than 2 minutes and recording no stats.

Rush was waived by the Clippers on January 22, 2010.

=== Los Angeles D-Fenders (2012) ===
On March 12, 2012, Los Angeles D-Fenders of the NBA D-League acquired Rush.

=== Los Angeles Slam (2012–2013) ===
For the 2012–13 season, Rush played for the Los Angeles Slam of the ABA.

=== Los Angeles D-Fenders (2013–2014) ===
In November 2013, he was re-acquired by the Los Angeles D-Fenders.

On January 22, 2014, Rush left the D-Fenders, citing his desire to formally retire from basketball.

=== BIG3 Basketball (2017) ===
In 2017, Rush joined the BIG3 basketball league, playing on a talent-stacked 3 Headed Monsters roster, highlighted by head coach (and NBA Hall of Famer) Gary Payton, as well as Kwame Brown (the first ever directly-from-high-school player to go #1 overall in the NBA draft), Rashard Lewis, Jason Williams, and Mahmoud Abdul-Rauf.

=== North American Premier Basketball (2018–2019) ===
In January 2018, he signed with the Kansas City Tornados of the first-year North American Premier Basketball.

== NBA career statistics ==
Legend
GP	Games played	GS	Games started	MPG	Minutes per game
FG%	Field goal percentage	3P%	3-point field goal percentage	FT%	Free throw percentage
RPG	Rebounds per game	APG	Assists per game	SPG	Steals per game
BPG	Blocks per game	PPG	Points per game	**Bold**	Career high

=== Regular season ===
Year	Team	GP	GS	MPG	FG%	3P%	FT%	RPG	APG	SPG	BPG	PPG
2002–03	L.A. Lakers	**76**	0	11.5	.393	.279	.696	1.2	.9	.1	.1	3.0
2003–04	L.A. Lakers	72	15	17.3	**.440**	.348	.596	1.3	.8	.5	.3	6.4
2004–05	L.A. Lakers	14	0	6.5	.200	.200	**1.000**	.7	.2	.1	.1	.9
2004–05	Charlotte	34	22	**25.8**	.396	.386	.761	2.3	**1.9**	.5	.2	**11.5**
2005–06	Charlotte	47	**25**	23.6	.386	.348	.714	2.2	1.1	**.8**	.3	10.1
2007–08	Indiana	71	15	21.2	.401	**.389**	.714	**2.4**	1.3	.6	.3	8.3
2008–09	Philadelphia	25	1	8.0	.345	.303	**1.000**	.6	.6	.2	.0	2.2
2009–10	L.A. Clippers	7	0	8.3	.364	.333	.000	.9	.6	.3	**.4**	1.3
Career		346	78	17.2	.400	.358	.703	1.7	1.0	.4	.2	6.4

=== Playoffs ===
Year	Team	GP	GS	MPG	FG%	3P%	FT%	RPG	APG	SPG	BPG	PPG
2003	L.A. Lakers	9	0	7.1	.379	.364	**1.000**	.3	.2	.1	.0	3.3
2004	L.A. Lakers	**22**	0	**14.3**	**.385**	**.400**	.667	**.7**	**.8**	**.5**	**.1**	**3.7**
Career		31	0	12.2	.383	.393	.857	.6	.6	.4	.1	3.6

== Personal life ==
Rush's younger brother Brandon also played in the NBA.

In 2010, Rush embarked on an R&B singing career, releasing his debut single "Hold You Down".
