= Simas Jasaitis =

Lithuanian basketball player

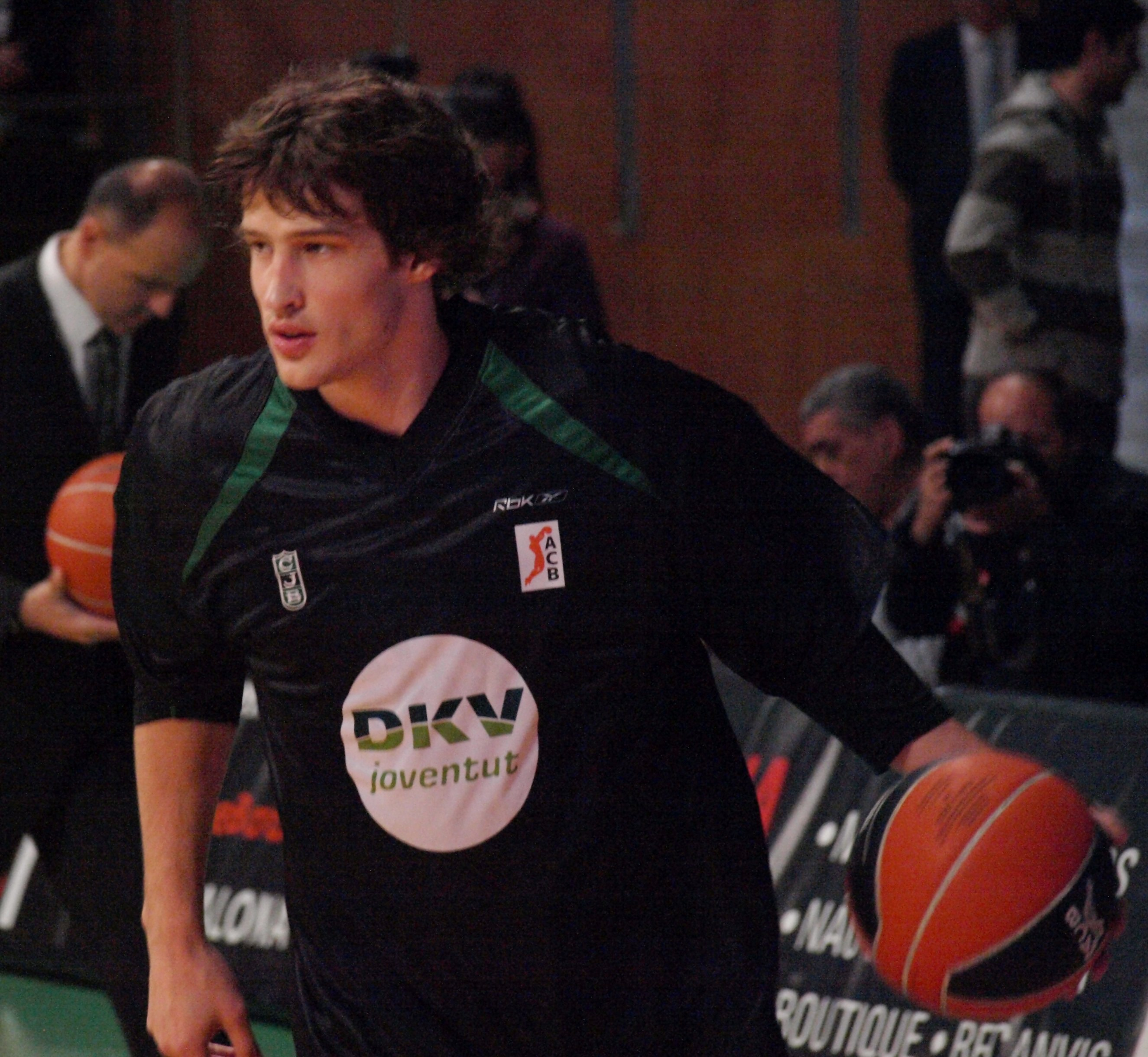
- Jasaitis with Joventut Badalona in 2009

Orlandina Basket
- Position: Small forward / shooting guard

Personal information
- Born: 26 March 1982 (age 44) Vilnius, Lithuanian SSR, Soviet Union
- Listed height: 6 ft 7 in (2.01 m)
- Listed weight: 218 lb (99 kg)

Career information
- NBA draft: 2004: undrafted
- Playing career: 2000–present

Career history
- 2000–2001: Sakalai
- 2001–2006: Lietuvos rytas
- 2006–2007: Maccabi Tel Aviv
- 2007–2008: TAU Cerámica
- 2008–2009: Joventut Badalona
- 2009–2010: Galatasaray Café Crown
- 2011: Lietuvos rytas
- 2011–2012: Türk Telekom
- 2012–2014: Lokomotiv Kuban
- 2015: Lietuvos rytas
- 2015–2016: Orlandina Basket
- 2016–2017: Consultinvest Pesaro
- 2017–2019: Lietkabelis Panevėžys
- 2019–2020: Chocolates Trapa Palencia
- 2020–2021: Dzūkija Alytus
- 2022–2023: M Basket Mažeikiai
- 2023–present: Orlandina Basket

Career highlights
- 2× EuroCup champion (2005, 2013); Liga ACB champion (2008); 2× LKL champion (2002, 2006); LKL All-Star Game MVP (2006); 2× LKL All-Star (2006, 2011); IBSL champion (2007); BBL champion (2006)
Medals
Men's basketball
Representing Lithuania
EuroBasket
Bronze medal – third place	2007 Spain	National team
World Cup
Bronze medal – third place	Turkey 2010	National team

Simas Jasaitis (born 26 March 1982) is a Lithuanian professional basketball player. He also represented the Lithuanian national basketball team.

== Professional career ==
Jasaitis' first team in the LKL was Sakalai during the 2000–2001 season. In the fall of 2001 he moved to Lietuvos rytas, and played there till 2006. In his first season with the club he was averaging 8 points and 3.6 rebounds per game. Jasaitis returned to Lietuvos Rytas on 31 December 2010. In July 2011 he signed a one-year deal with Türk Telekom B.K. On 5 January 2015 he went back to Lietuvos rytas.

On 5 July 2016 he signed with Victoria Libertas Pesaro.

On 28 July 2017 Jasaitis signed with BC Lietkabelis. On 12 September 2020 he signed with BC Dzūkija.

On 27 May 2023 Jasaitis announced his retirement from professional basketball and was set to become an assistant coach for BC Mažeikiai in the 2023–24 season. However, the deal was cancelled as Jasaitis decided to continue his playing career with Orlandina Basket of the Italian third-tier Serie B.

== Career statistics ==
Legend
GP	Games played	GS	Games started	MPG	Minutes per game
FG%	Field-goal percentage	3P%	3-point field-goal percentage	FT%	Free-throw percentage
RPG	Rebounds per game	APG	Assists per game	SPG	Steals per game
BPG	Blocks per game	PPG	Points per game	PIR	Performance index rating
**Bold**	Career high

=== EuroLeague ===
Year	Team	GP	GS	MPG	FG%	3P%	FT%	RPG	APG	SPG	BPG	PPG	PIR
2005–06	Lietuvos rytas	20	**19**	**29.2**	.473	.396	.741	**5.0**	1.0	**1.5**	**.2**	**10.7**	**10.9**
2006–07	Maccabi Tel Aviv	**23**	**19**	25.0	.503	.400	.816	3.5	.5	.6	.1	9.9	9.2
2007–08	TAU Cerámica	21	5	14.5	**.507**	**.500**	.833	1.4	.2	.2	.0	4.6	3.3
2008–09	Joventut	10	7	21.5	.449	.342	.818	2.8	1.0	.8	**.2**	9.3	9.2
2010–11	Lietuvos rytas	6	4	17.4	.353	.250	.833	2.3	**1.2**	.3	**.2**	5.5	3.7
2013–14	Lokomotiv Kuban	**23**	14	21.5	.447	.353	**.1000**	2.8	.6	.7	.1	6.2	5.8
Career		103	68	22.1	.472	.389	.815	3.1	.7	.7	.1	7.8	7.2

== Awards and achievements ==
=== Pro clubs ===
- 2× Lithuanian League Champion: (2002, 2006)
- 2× ULEB Cup (EuroCup) Champion: (2005, 2013)
- 2× Lithuanian All-Star: (2006, 2011)
- Lithuanian All-Star Game MVP: (2006)
- Baltic League Champion: (2006)
- Israeli League Champion: (2007)
- Spanish League Champion: (2008)

=== Lithuanian senior national team ===
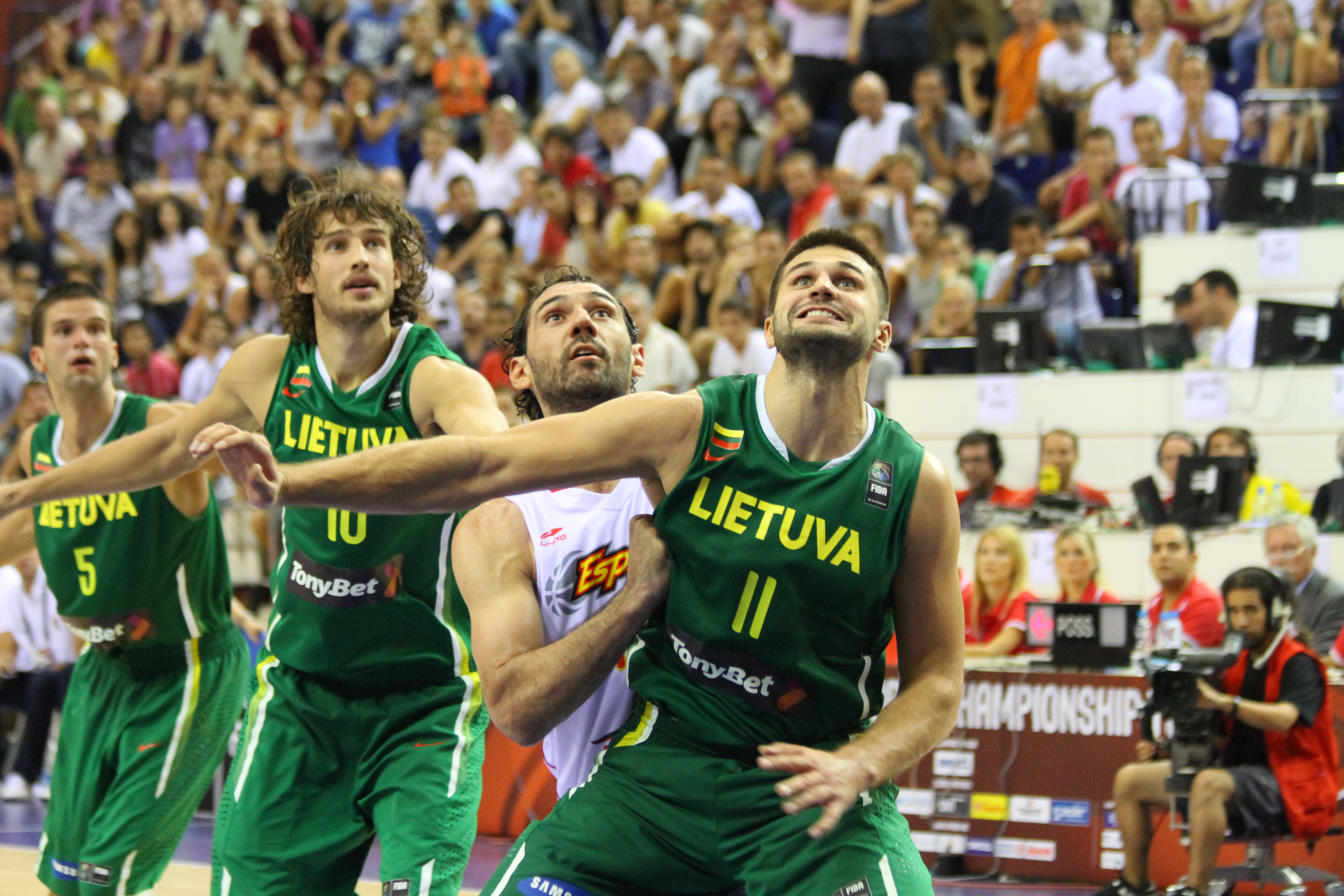
Jasaitis (left, #10) during the 2010 FIBA World Championship

- EuroBasket 2007: Bronze
- 2010 FIBA World Championship, Turkey: Bronze

=== State awards ===
- Lithuania: Recipient of the Commander's Cross of the Order for Merits to Lithuania (2007)
- Lithuania: Recipient of the Commander's Cross of the Order of the Lithuanian Grand Duke Gediminas (2010)
