= 2010 LKL All-Star Game =

Ereliai	Vilkai
104	109
	1	2	3	4	Total
Ereliai	34	26	27	17	104
Vilkai	23	31	33	22	109
- Date: March 20, 2010
- Venue: Cido arena, Panevėžys
- MVP: Mindaugas Kuzminskas

The 2010 LKL All-Star Game, was held in Cido Arena, on March 20, 2010.

== Roster ==
Vilkai
Pos.	Player	Team	Total Votes
Starters
PG	(United States) Marcus Brown	Žalgiris	7,630
SG	(Lithuania) Steponas Babrauskas	Lietuvos Rytas	2,313
SF	(Lithuania) Dainius Šalenga*	Žalgiris	4,201
PF	(United States) Travis Watson	Žalgiris	5,320
C	(Slovenia) Mirza Begić	Žalgiris	4,390
Reserves
PG	(United States) Derrick Low	Šiauliai	
PG	(Lithuania) Tomas Gaidamavičius	Juventus	
SG	(Albania) Rashaun Broadus	Sūduva	
SG	(Lithuania) Virginijus Sirvydis	Sakalai	
SF	(Lithuania) Valdas Dabkus	Rūdupis	
PF	(Bosnia and Herzegovina) Kenan Bajramović	Lietuvos Rytas	
C	(Lithuania) Egidijus Dimša	Nevėžis	

Ereliai
Pos.	Player	Team	Total Votes
Starters
PG	(Lithuania) Mantas Kalnietis	Žalgiris	5,711
SG	(Lithuania) Martynas Pocius	Žalgiris	4,467
SF	(Lithuania) Arvydas Šikšnius	Šiauliai	3,559
PF	(Lithuania) Mindaugas Kuzminskas	Šiauliai	5,809
C	(Lithuania) Jonas Valančiūnas	Lietuvos Rytas	5,823
Reserves
PG	(Lithuania) Žydrūnas Kelys	Perlas	
PG	(Lithuania) Ernestas Ežerskis	Techasas	
SG	(Lithuania) Martynas Gecevičius	Lietuvos Rytas	
SF	(Lithuania) Deividas Gailius	Šiauliai	
PF	(Lithuania) Giedrius Staniulis	Perlas	
PF	(Lithuania) Aurimas Adomaitis	Alytus	
C	(Lithuania) Vaidas Čepukaitis	Aisčiai	

- Replaced by Tadas Klimavičius.

== Statistics ==
LTV

March 20
7:30 p.m.

Ereliai 104, Vilkai 109
Scoring by quarter: 34-23, 26-31, 27-33, 17-22
Pts: Mindaugas Kuzminskas 26; Rebs: Jonas Valančiūnas 7 Asts: Mindaugas Kuzminskas 8	Pts: Egidijus Dimša 21; Rebs: Travis Watson, Mirza Begić 5 Asts: Marcus Brown 7

Cido arena, Panevėžys, Lithuania

== Coaches ==
The coach of Team Vilkai was Rimas Kurtinaitis, of Lietuvos Rytas, who received 5,490 votes. The coach of Team Ereliai was Antanas Sireika, of Šiauliai, with 3,005 votes.

== Other events ==
=== All-Star 3-point shootout ===
The leading scorer in 3-point percentage of the LKL was Donatas Zavackas. Besides him, one player, usually with a good 3-point percentage, was chosen from every team in the league. Below is the list of participating players. The winner received the trophy, a prize and a 4,000 Litas check.

	Name	Club
1	(Lithuania) Donatas Zavackas	Lietuvos Rytas Vilnius
2	(Lithuania) Martynas Gecevičius	Lietuvos Rytas Vilnius
3	(United States) Derrick Low	BC Siauliai
4	(Lithuania) Adas Juškevičius	Žalgiris Kaunas
5	(Lithuania) Julius Zurna	Neptunas Klaipeda
6	(Lithuania) Andrius Mineikis	Juventus Utena
7	(Lithuania) Gytis Andrijauskas	Rudupis Prienai
8	(Lithuania) Laimonas Lukoševičius	Techasas Panevezys
9	(Lithuania) Virginijus Sirvydis	Sakalai Vilnius
10	(Lithuania) Giedrius Kurtinaitis	Aisciai Kaunas
11	(Lithuania) Eimantas Bendžius	Perlas Vilnius
12	(Lithuania) Andrius Aleksandrovas	BC Alytus
13	(Lithuania) Darius Gvezdauskas	Nevezis Kedainiai
