= 2012 LKL All-Star Game =

Time Team	Lietuviai
100	115
	1	2	3	4	Total
Time Team	33	25	19	23	100
Lietuviai	34	21	28	32	115
- Date: March 12, 2010
- Venue: Švyturys Arena, Klaipėda
- MVP: Jonas Valančiūnas

The annual 2012 LKL All-star game, was held in Švyturys Arena, in Klaipėda, on March 3.

== Teams ==
Lietuviai
Pos.	Player	Team	Total Votes
Starters
PG	(Lithuania) Mantas Kalnietis	Žalgiris	9,605
SG	(Lithuania) Renaldas Seibutis	Lietuvos Rytas	5,632
SF	(Lithuania) Mindaugas Kuzminskas	Žalgiris	4,121
PF	(Lithuania) Paulius Jankūnas	Žalgiris	8,065
C	(Lithuania) Jonas Valančiūnas	Lietuvos Rytas	6,910
Reserves
SG	(Lithuania) Gintaras Kadžiulis	Rūdupis	
PG	(Lithuania) Martynas Mažeika	Neptūnas	
PG	(Lithuania) Darius Pakamanis	Juventus	
SF	(Lithuania) Evaldas Baniulis	Sakalai	
PF	(Lithuania) Valdas Vasylius	Šiauliai	
PF	(Lithuania) Mindaugas Katelynas*	Lietuvos Rytas	
C	(Lithuania) Robertas Javtokas	Žalgiris	

Time Team
Pos.	Player	Team	Total Votes
Starters
PG	(Montenegro) Tyrese Rice	Lietuvos Rytas	6,006
SG	(Croatia) Marko Popović	Žalgiris	9,118
SF	(United States) Sonny Weems	Žalgiris	11,317
PF	(United States) Nelson Reeves**	Žalgiris	4,547
C	(Serbia) Milovan Raković	Žalgiris	8,174
Reserves
PG	(Serbia) Aleksandar Rašić	Lietuvos Rytas	
PG	(Albania) Rashaun Broadus	Šiauliai	
SG	(Puerto Rico) Trévon Hughes	Pieno žvaigždės	
SF	(United States) David McClure	Triobet	
SF	(Latvia) Artūrs Brūniņš	Neptūnas	
PF	(Croatia) Mario Delaš	Baltai	
C	(Jamaica) Dane Johnson	Naglis	

- Mindaugas Katelynas was replaced by Laimonas Kisielius, due to injury.
- Nelson Reeves was replaced by Lawrence Roberts, due to his contract termination with Žalgiris.

== Coaches ==
"Lietuviai" was coached by Lithuanian Antanas Sireika, of Šiauliai, who acquired 5,734 votes. "Time Team" was coached by Serbian Aleksandar Trifunović, of Žalgiris, who acquired 9,247 votes.

== Notables ==
=== Lietuviai team ===
- Jonas Valančiūnas – 23 minutes, 25 points (11/16 2PT, 1/1 3PT), 13 rebounds, 6 assists, 1 block
- Mindaugas Kuzminskas – 23 minutes, 24 points (10/12 2PT, 1/3 3PT, 1/2 FT), 4 rebounds, 2 assists, 2 blocks
- Renaldas Seibutis – 22 minutes, 17 points (4/6 2PT, 3/4 3PT), 3 rebounds, 3 assists, 1 block
- Mantas Kalnietis – 19 minutes, 13 points (5/6 2PT, 1/2 3PT), 4 rebounds, 11 assists, 3 blocks

=== Time team ===
- Sonny Weems – 18 minutes, 21 points (6/8 2PT, 3/7 3PT), 5 rebounds, 4 blocks
- Rashaun Broadus – 21 minutes, 20 points (4/7 2PT, 4/4 3PT), 3 rebounds, 6 assists, 1 block
- Milovan Raković – 20 minutes, 13 points, (5/5 2PT, 1/3 3PT), 3 rebounds, 1 block
- Trévon Hughes – 17 minutes, 11 points (4/5 2PT, 1/7 3PT), 1 rebound, 5 assists, 5 blocks
