= Jonas Valančiūnas =

Lithuanian basketball player (born 1992)

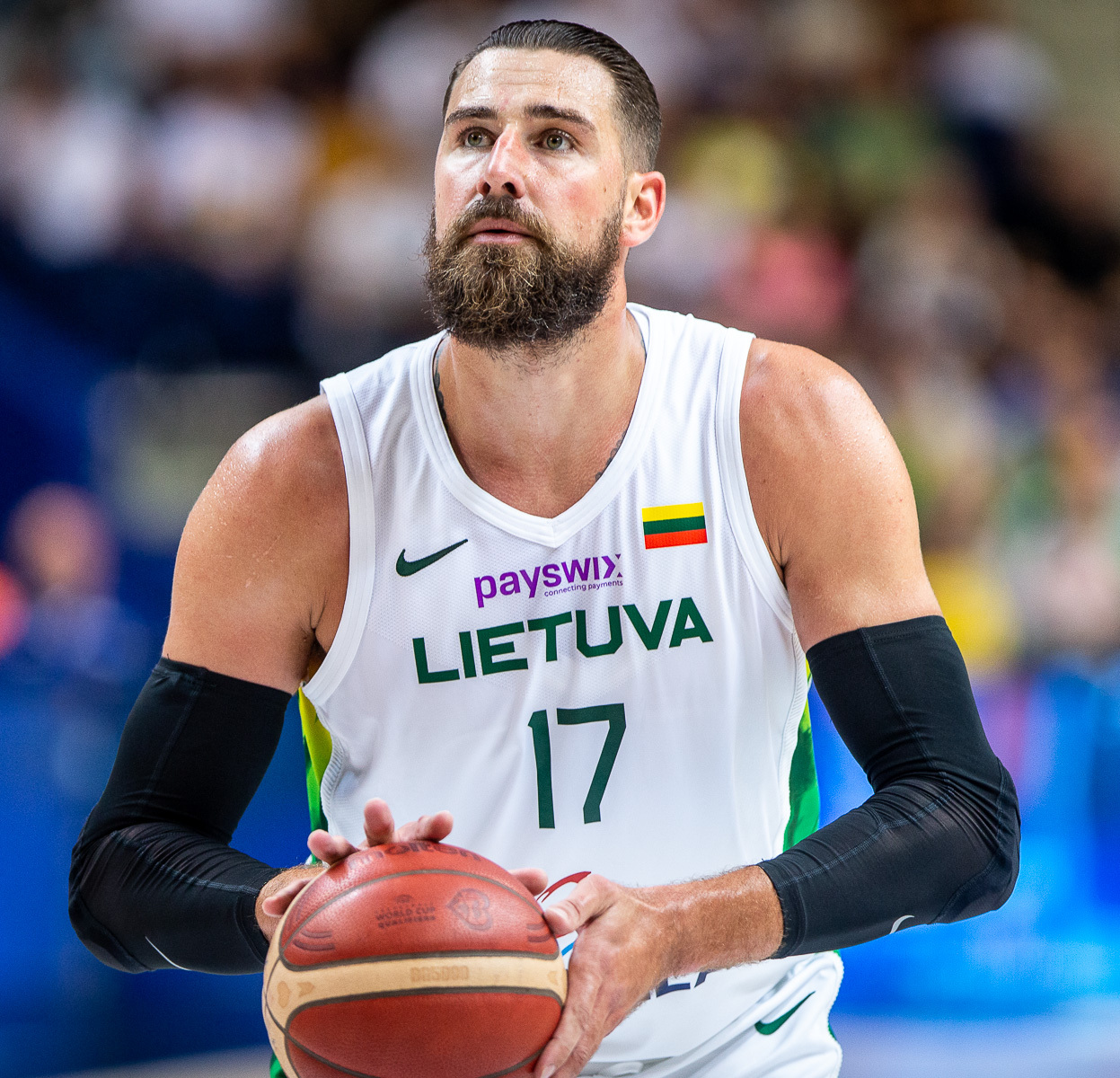
- Valančiūnas with Lithuania national team in 2022

No. 17 – Žalgiris
- Position: Center
- League: LKL; EuroLeague

Personal information
- Born: 6 May 1992 (age 34) Utena, Lithuania
- Listed height: 6 ft 11 in (2.11 m)
- Listed weight: 265 lb (120 kg)

Career information
- NBA draft: 2011: 1st round, 5th overall pick
- Drafted by: Toronto Raptors
- Playing career: 2008–present

Career history
- 2008–2009: Perlas
- 2009–2012: Lietuvos rytas
- 2009–2010: →Perlas
- 2012–2019: Toronto Raptors
- 2019–2021: Memphis Grizzlies
- 2021–2024: New Orleans Pelicans
- 2024–2025: Washington Wizards
- 2025: Sacramento Kings
- 2025–2026: Denver Nuggets
- 2026–present: Žalgiris

Career highlights
- NBA All-Rookie Second Team (2013); 2× FIBA Young Player of the Year (2011, 2012); All-EuroCup First Team (2012); EuroCup Rising Star (2012); LKL champion (2010); 2× LKL Most Improved Player (2011, 2012); LKL MVP (2012); LKL Domestic Player of the Year (2012); 2× LKL blocks leader (2011, 2012); 2× All-LKL Team (2011, 2012); 3× All-LKL Defensive Team (2010–2012); LKF Cup winner (2010); 3× LKL All-Star (2010–2012); 2× LKL All-Star Game MVP (2011, 2012); All-VTB United League First Team (2012); VTB United League rebounding leader (2012); VTB United League blocks leader (2012); 7× Lithuanian Basketball Player of the Year (2011, 2012, 2014, 2017, 2021, 2023, 2025); FIBA Under-19 World Cup MVP (2011)
- Stats at NBA.com
- Stats at Basketball Reference
Medals
Men's basketball
Representing Lithuania
EuroBasket
Silver medal – second place	2013 Slovenia
Silver medal – second place	2015 France–Croatia–Germany–Latvia
World U-19 Cup
Gold medal – first place	2011 Latvia	Team
European U-18 Championship
Gold medal – first place	2010 Lithuania	Team
European U-16 Championship
Gold medal – first place	2008 Italy	Team
Bronze medal – third place	2007 Greece	Team
European Youth Olympic Festival
Gold medal – first place	2007 Serbia

Jonas Valančiūnas (/ˈjoʊnəs/ /ˌvælənˈtʃunəs/ YOH-nəss VAL-ən-CHOO-nəs; Lithuanian pronunciation: [ˈjoːnɐs vɐɫɐnʲˈtɕûːnɐs]; born 6 May 1992) is a Lithuanian professional basketball player for Žalgiris of the Lithuanian Basketball League (LKL) and the EuroLeague. He was selected by the Toronto Raptors with the fifth overall pick in the 2011 NBA draft. He has also played for the Memphis Grizzlies, New Orleans Pelicans, Washington Wizards, Sacramento Kings, and Denver Nuggets.

Valančiūnas has been a member of the Lithuania national team since age 19. He won two EuroBasket silver medals in EuroBasket 2013 and EuroBasket 2015, earning All-Tournament honours in the latter. Valančiūnas also appeared in the documentary The Other Dream Team.

== Professional career ==
=== Perlas (2008–2010) ===
Valančiūnas started playing professionally for Perlas in 2008. During the 2008–09 season the team played in the National Basketball League (NKL), Lithuania's second strongest league, but moved up to the top-tier Lithuanian Basketball League (LKL) the following season. In January 2009 Valančiūnas signed a long-term contract with Lietuvos rytas, but, as Perlas was Lietuvos rytas' farm club, he did not immediately move to Lietuvos rytas, staying with Perlas for the first half of the 2009–10 season.

=== Lietuvos rytas (2010–2012) ===
On 17 January 2010, Valančiūnas finally moved to Lietuvos rytas. A month after that Lietuvos rytas won the 2010 edition of Lithuanian Basketball Federation's LKF Cup. While playing there, Valančiūnas played in the LKL Finals three times, in 2010, 2011 and 2012. The team won the 2010 series 4–3 against Žalgiris, but lost to the same team the following year 4–1 and 3–0 in 2012.

Valančiūnas became February's MVP in the VTB United League in 2012. Two months later he won the EuroCup Rising Star award and was named in the All-EuroCup squad. He averaged 10.8 points, 7.6 rebounds and 1.6 blocks, while shooting 63.4% from the field, leading Lietuvos rytas to third place.

Valančiūnas participated in three LKL All-Star Games in 2010, 2011 and 2012. During the 2011 All-Star Game Valančiūnas scored 18 points and grabbed 10 rebounds, helping this team win the game. He was named as the 2011 LKL All-Star Game MVP. During the 2012 game he led his team to victory, scoring 25 points including one three-pointer, grabbing 13 rebounds and dishing out 6 assists. He won the MVP award once again.

In December 2011, Valančiūnas was named the Lithuanian Basketball Player of the Year for the first time. He was also twice named the FIBA European Young Player of the Year in February 2012 and February 2013.

=== Toronto Raptors (2012–2019) ===
==== 2012–13 season ====
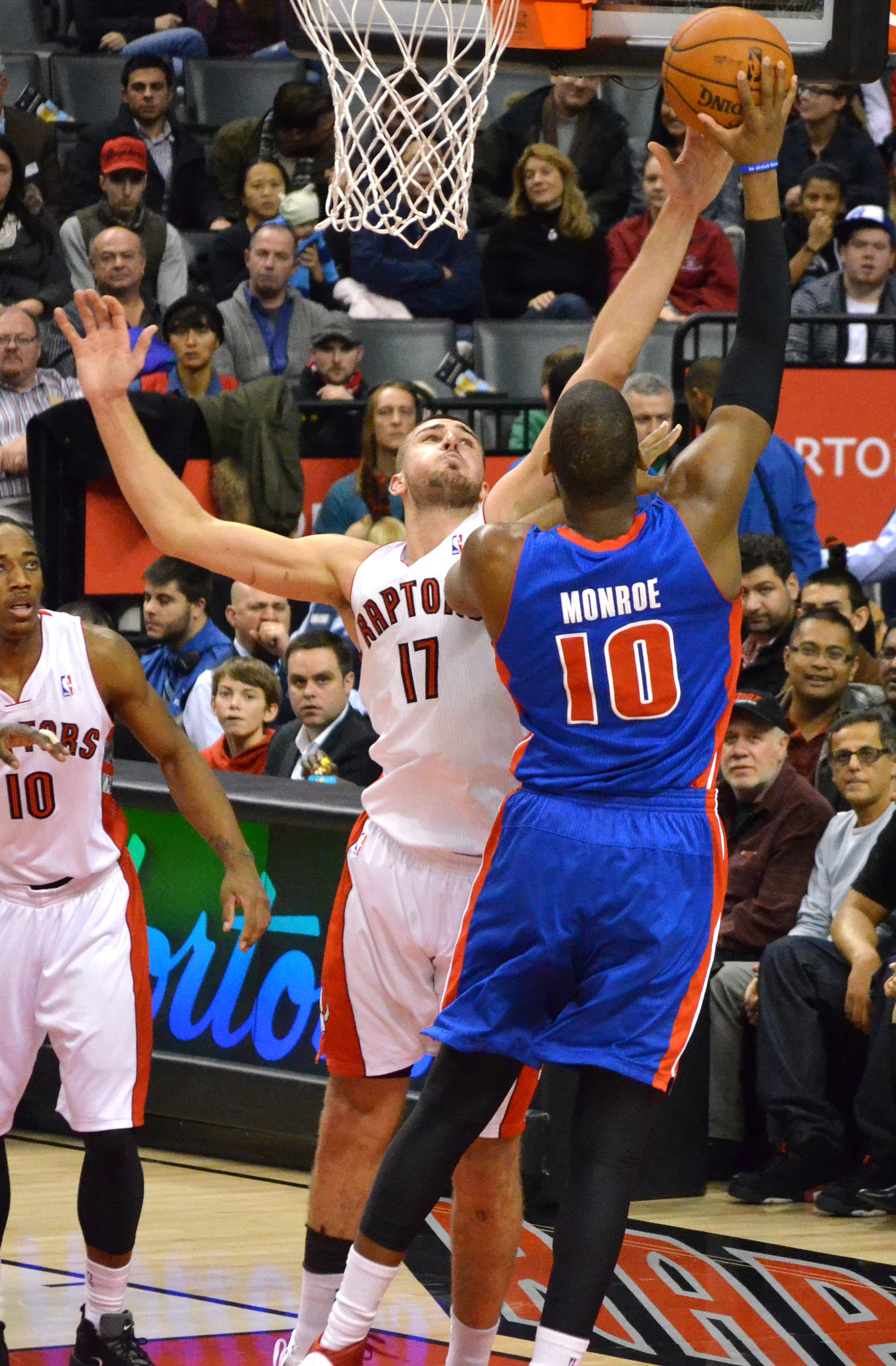
Valančiūnas blocks future teammate Greg Monroe in 2013

Valančiūnas was considered as a top prospect at the 2011 NBA draft, held on 23 June 2011, and was drafted fifth overall by the Toronto Raptors. He signed with the Raptors on 18 July 2012, and made his NBA debut on 31 October, during a game against the Indiana Pacers. He recorded 12 points and 10 rebounds in 23 minutes of action as a starter, becoming the first Raptors rookie since Damon Stoudamire in 1995 to record a double-double in his first game. In December 2012, Valančiūnas was selected as the Lithuanian Basketball Player of the Year for the second time. On 5 April 2013, Valančiūnas was named Eastern Conference's Rookie of the Month for games played in March. He ranked first among Eastern Conference rookies in averages per game in rebounds (7.3), blocks (1.07), and field goal percentage (.620). He also ranked second in free throw percentage (.822) and fourth in scoring (11.4 points per game), reaching double figures in points in 11 of his last 12 games between 6 and 31 March.

==== 2013–14 season ====
On 22 July 2013, Valančiūnas was named MVP of the Las Vegas Summer League becoming the first non-American to win the award after averaging 19 points and 10 rebounds in four games.

On 27 December, Valančiūnas recorded a then career-high 18 rebounds in a 95–83 win over the New York Knicks. On 9 April 2014, he scored a then career-high 26 points in a 125–114 win over the Philadelphia 76ers. Two days later, he recorded a then career-high 21 rebounds in a 108–100 loss to the New York Knicks. The Raptors finished in third place in the conference in the 2013–14 season, and faced the sixth-seeded Brooklyn Nets in the first round of the 2014 NBA playoffs. In game 1 of the series, Valančiūnas recorded 17 points and 18 rebounds, surpassing Keon Clark's franchise record for most rebounds in a single playoff game. He also became the second Raptor ever to record a double-double in his playoff debut; the first was Tracy McGrady. The Raptors went on to lose the series 4–3.

==== 2014–15 season ====
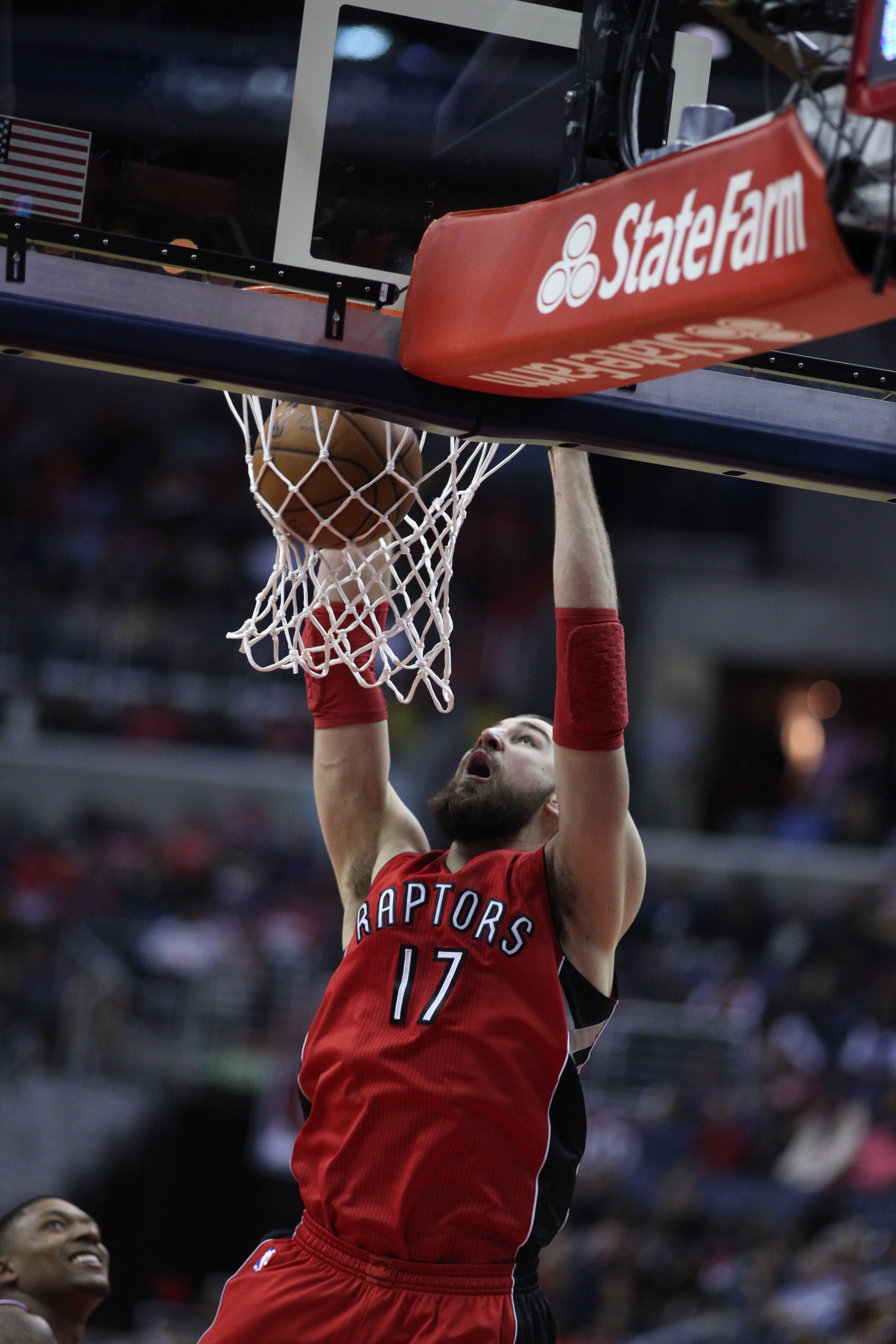
Valančiūnas dunks into the basket in 2015

On 17 December 2014, Valančiūnas was selected as the Lithuanian Basketball Player of the Year for the third time.

On 31 January 2015, Valančiūnas scored a then career-high 31 points in a 114–111 loss to the Detroit Pistons. He finished the 2014–15 season with a back-to-the-basket shot percentage of 51.3%, good for second in the NBA behind fellow Lithuanian Donatas Motiejūnas of the Houston Rockets, who was attacking with 53.4% this way. Valančiūnas was ranked second in the two-points field goal percentage category during the 2014–15 season.

==== 2015–16 season ====
On 20 August 2015, Valančiūnas signed a four-year, $64 million contract extension with the Raptors. Prior to the start of the 2015–16 season, Valančiūnas was named the 57th (out of 400) best player in the league by ESPN, jumping 34 positions from the previous season when he was ranked 91st. On 22 November, he was ruled out for six weeks with a fracture in his left hand. He returned to action on 28 December against the Chicago Bulls after missing 17 games with the injury. On 10 March 2016, in a win over the Atlanta Hawks, he recorded 10 points and 10 rebounds, his career-high 16th straight game scoring in double figures and his 16th double-double of the season. His double figure record ended at 17 games after re-injuring his left hand on 14 March against the Chicago Bulls, leaving the game with 2:25 remaining in the first quarter and did not return.

On 30 March, Valančiūnas recorded 19 points and 9 rebounds in a 105–97 win over the Atlanta Hawks, helping the Raptors record a 50-win season for the first time in franchise history. On 1 April, he recorded 11 points, 14 rebounds and a career-best seven blocks in a 99–95 win over the Memphis Grizzlies. The Raptors finished the regular season as the second seed in the conference with a 56–26 record.

During the 2016 NBA playoffs, in game 1 of the Raptors' first round playoff series against the seventh-seeded Indiana Pacers, Valančiūnas set a franchise playoff record with 19 rebounds, surpassing his own mark set in 2014. In game 2 of the series, Valančiūnas recorded a playoff career-high 23 points and 15 rebounds in a 98–87 win, tying the series a 1–1. The Raptors went on to win the series 4–3. In the second round, the Raptors faced the Miami Heat, but in game 3 of the series, Valančiūnas went down with a sprained right ankle. He subsequently missed eight straight games, returning to action in game 5 of the Eastern Conference finals against the Cleveland Cavaliers. The Raptors lost to the Cavaliers in game 6 as the Raptors' deepest playoff run in franchise history ended with a 4–2 series loss.

==== 2016–17 season ====
In the Raptors' season opener on 26 October 2016, Valančiūnas recorded a then career-high 32 points and 11 rebounds in a 109–91 win over the Detroit Pistons. On 10 January 2017, Valančiūnas grabbed a then career-high 23 rebounds to go with 18 points in a 114–106 win over the Boston Celtics. On 31 March, Valančiūnas made team history in the third quarter of Toronto's 111–100 win over the Indiana Pacers. He had 13 of his 17 rebounds during the quarter, setting a franchise mark for most in a single period. He also had 16 points for his team-leading 28th double-double of the season. He also established a career high during the game, surpassing the 714 rebounds he had in the 2013–14 season.

==== 2017–18 season ====
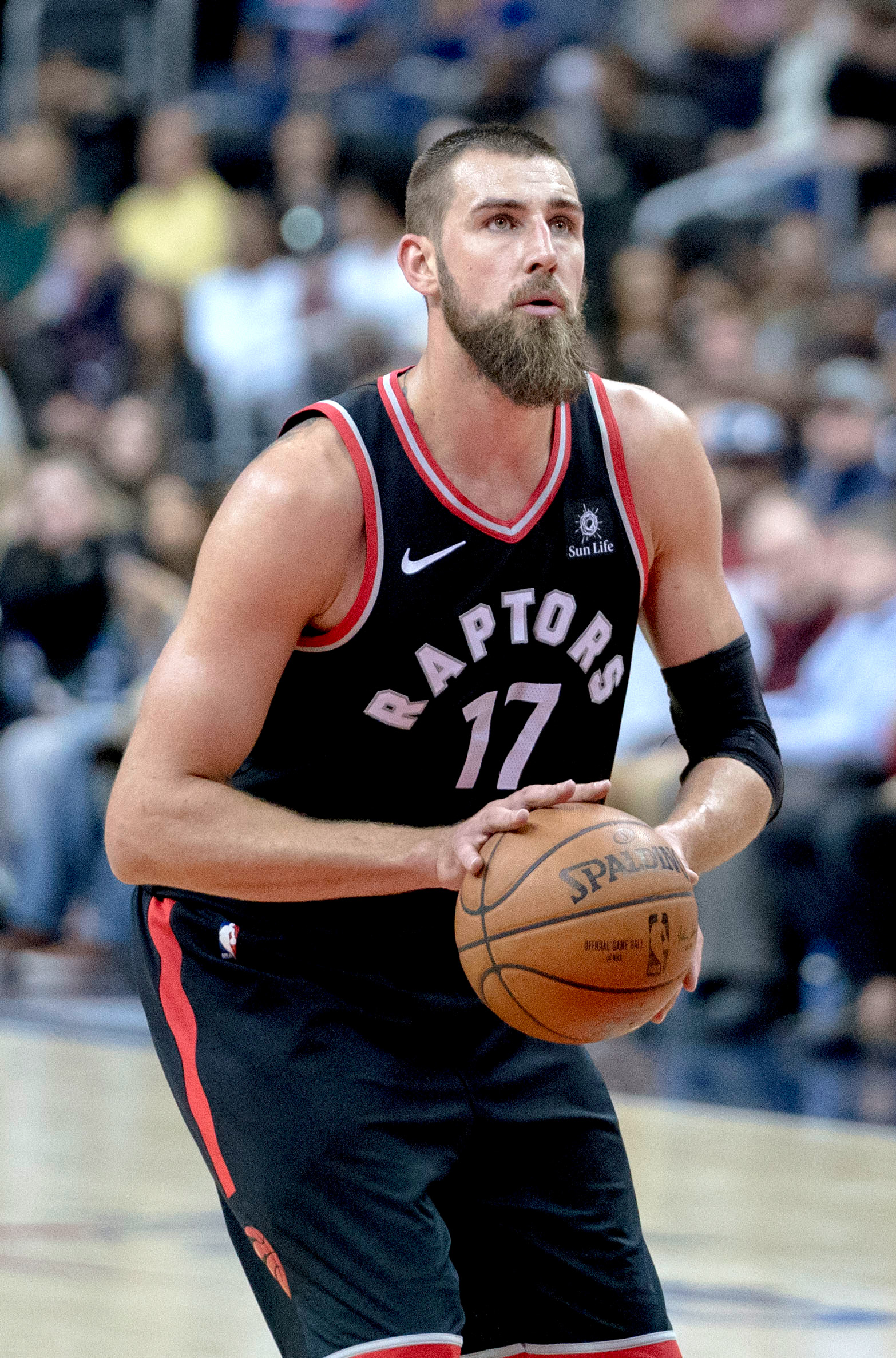
Valančiūnas with the Toronto Raptors in 2018

On 11 January 2018, Valančiūnas had 15 points and a season-high 18 rebounds in a 133–99 win over the Cleveland Cavaliers. On 15 January, Valančiūnas was selected as the Lithuanian Basketball Player of the Year for the fourth time. On 26 January, he had a season-high 28 points and 14 rebounds in a 97–93 loss to the Utah Jazz. During the 2018 NBA playoffs, in game 2 of the Raptors' first-round playoff series against the Washington Wizards, Valančiūnas had 19 points and 14 rebounds, as Toronto took a 2–0 lead in a playoff series for the first time in franchise history with a 130–119 win. It was his 12th playoff double-double, matching Antonio Davis for the most in Raptors history. He set the Raptors' playoff double-double record in game 5 with 14 points and 13 rebounds. The Raptors went on to win the series in six games to move on to the second round. In game 1 of Toronto's second-round series against the Cleveland Cavaliers, Valančiūnas recorded 21 points and 21 rebounds in a 113–112 overtime loss. It marked the best double-double performance by a Raptors player in franchise's playoff history. The Raptors went on to be swept by the Cavaliers for the second straight year.

==== 2018–19 season ====
On 21 November 2018, Valančiūnas had season highs of 24 points and 13 rebounds in a 124–108 win over the Atlanta Hawks. On 5 December, he scored 18 of his season-high 26 in the fourth quarter of Toronto's 113–102 win over the Philadelphia 76ers. On 13 December, he was ruled out for at least four weeks after undergoing surgery on his dislocated left thumb, an injury he sustained the previous night against the Golden State Warriors.

=== Memphis Grizzlies (2019–2021) ===
On 7 February 2019, Valančiūnas was traded, along with C. J. Miles, Delon Wright and a 2024 second-round pick, to the Memphis Grizzlies in exchange for Marc Gasol. On 12 February, after being medically cleared to return from the thumb injury, Valančiūnas made his debut for the Grizzlies, recording 23 points and 10 rebounds in a 108–107 loss to the San Antonio Spurs. On 20 March, Valančiūnas scored a then career-high 33 points and had 15 rebounds in the Grizzlies' 126–125 overtime win over the Houston Rockets. Two days later, he had 23 points and career-high 24 rebounds in a 123–119 overtime loss to the Orlando Magic. He set the franchise record for defensive rebounds in a game (23), surpassing Shareef Abdur-Rahim, who had 18 defensive boards twice. On 30 March, he set a then career high with 34 points to go with 20 rebounds (11 offensive) in a 120–115 win over the Phoenix Suns. It was a career-best sixth straight double-double for Valančiūnas, with the streak ending the next day against the Los Angeles Clippers after injuring his right ankle in the third quarter. On 1 April, he was ruled out for the rest of the season with a grade II right ankle sprain.

On 11 July 2019, Valančiūnas signed a reported three-year, $45 million contract with the Grizzlies. On 28 February 2020, Valančiūnas improved his career record by grabbing 25 rebounds (6 offensive), however his team lost 104–101 to the Sacramento Kings. The next day, he scored 22 points, grabbed 20 rebounds and improved the Grizzlies' record (45 rebounds) for the most rebounds in two consecutive games (previously the record belonged to Zach Randolph who had 42 rebounds in 2009), helping his team to defeat the Western Conference leaders Los Angeles Lakers 105–88. On 13 August, Valančiūnas achieved his career's first triple-double – 26 points (including two three-pointers), 19 rebounds, 12 assists and led his team to a 119–106 victory over the Milwaukee Bucks, which secured chances to play in the 2020 NBA playoffs, versus the Western Conference leaders Los Angeles Lakers.

On 10 March 2021, Valančiūnas logged a double-double with 29 points and 20 rebounds along with 4 blocks in a 127–112 win over the Washington Wizards, becoming the first player in franchise history to post at least 25 points, 20 rebounds and 4 blocks in a game. On 10 April, Valančiūnas tied a then career-high 34 points, along with 22 rebounds, in a 132–125 loss to the Indiana Pacers. On 12 April, Valančiūnas recorded his franchise-record, 15th consecutive double-double with 26 points and 14 rebounds to lead the Memphis Grizzlies past the Chicago Bulls 101–90. His record-setting streak of double-doubles surpassed a mark set by Zach Randolph in January 2011.

=== New Orleans Pelicans (2021–2024) ===
On 7 August 2021, Valančiūnas was traded to the New Orleans Pelicans for Eric Bledsoe, Steven Adams, and a 2022 protected first-round pick. On 20 October, Valančiūnas signed a reported two-year, $30 million contract extension with the Pelicans. On 29 November, Valančiūnas recorded a career-high 39 points on seven three-pointers made, along with 15 rebounds, in a 123–104 win over the Los Angeles Clippers.

On 7 February 2022, Valančiūnas was selected as the Lithuanian Basketball Player of the Year for the fifth time.

On 14 February 2024, Valančiūnas was selected as the Lithuanian Basketball Player of the Year for the sixth time.

=== Washington Wizards (2024–2025) ===
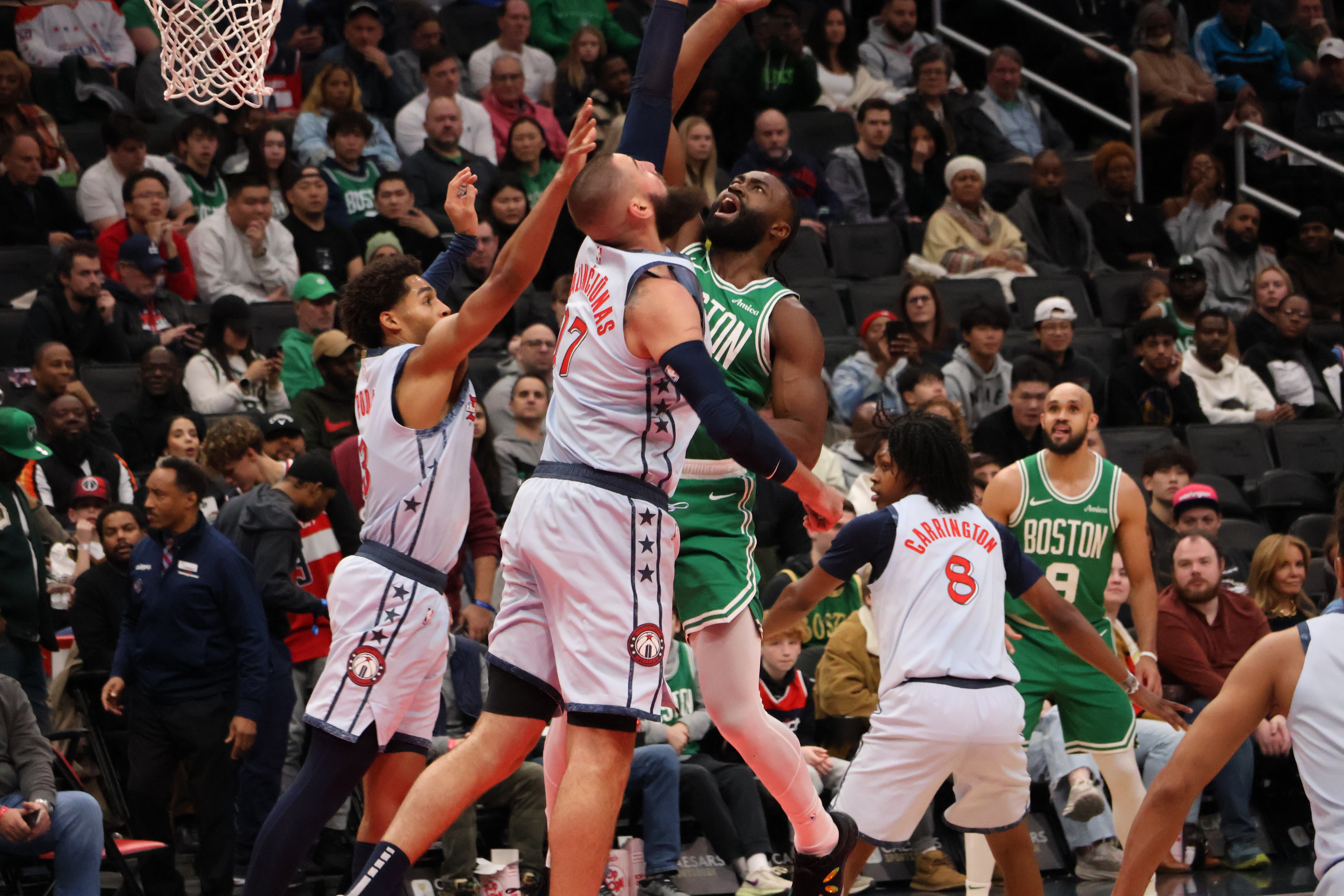
Valančiūnas defending Jaylen Brown while playing for the Washington Wizards

On 6 July 2024, Valančiūnas signed a three-year, $30 million contract as part of a sign-and-trade agreement with the Washington Wizards. New Orleans acquired a 2027 protected second-round pick in the trade.

=== Sacramento Kings (2025) ===
On 5 February 2025, Valančiūnas was traded to the Sacramento Kings in exchange for two second-round picks (2028, 2029) and forward Sidy Cissoko.

=== Denver Nuggets (2025–2026) ===
On 13 July 2025, Valančiūnas was traded to the Denver Nuggets in exchange for Dario Šarić.

Prior to the official completion of his trade to the Nuggets, Valančiūnas traveled to Athens, Greece, in July 2025 to undergo medical evaluations with Panathinaikos. Reports indicated that Panathinaikos had offered him a three-year deal worth approximately €12 million net, which was more lucrative than his NBA contract before taxes, and promised him a leading role in the team, while the trade from Kings to Nuggets had been agreed upon but was not yet finalised. After completing the medical and evaluating his options, Valančiūnas ultimately decided to remain with the Nuggets, honouring his existing NBA contract, which included $10.4 million guaranteed for the 2025–26 season and a non-guaranteed $10 million for 2026–27. Valančiūnas explained that the Panathinaikos offer to play closer to home was very appealing.

On 4 February 2026, Valančiūnas was selected as the Lithuanian Basketball Player of the Year for the seventh time. On 8 April, Valančiūnas played his 1,000th NBA regular season game and became the first Lithuanian player to reach the mark. In the 2025–26 season the Nuggets finished third in the Western Conference and in the first round of the 2026 NBA playoffs faced off the sixth-seeded Minnesota Timberwolves, whose leader Anthony Edwards got injured while playing in the series, but Denver still lost the series 4–2, while Valančiūnas' role in the series was episodical with only 6.3 minutes of playing time per game.

On 8 July 2026, Valančiūnas was waived by the Nuggets.

=== Žalgiris (2026–present) ===
On 15 July 2026, Valančiūnas opted to end his 14-year NBA career and signed a reported two-year, $5.5 million contract with Lithuania's Žalgiris of the LKL and EuroLeague.

== National team career ==
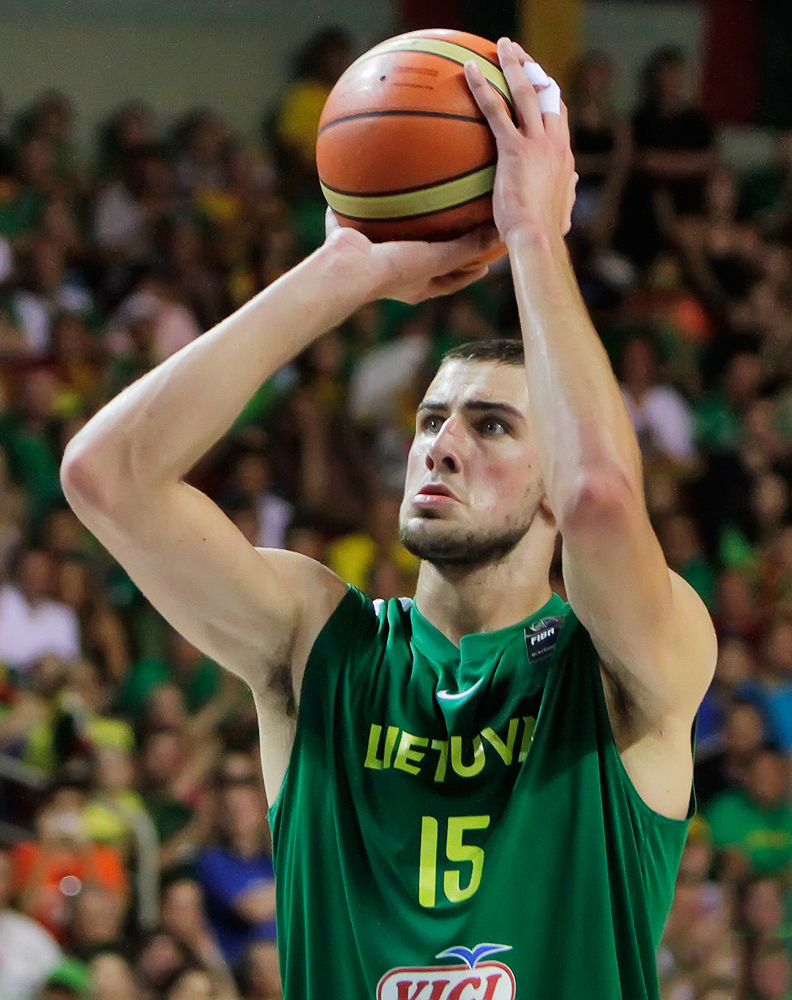
Valančiūnas with Lithuania under-19 team

Valančiūnas made his debut for the Lithuania national under-16 team in the 2008 FIBA Europe Under-16 Championship. He dominated throughout the tournament, averaging 14.3 points, 11.1 rebounds and 2.3 blocks in 23.5 minutes of action. Lithuania went on to win the gold medal and he was chosen as the MVP.

In the summer of 2009, Valančiūnas participated in the European Under-18 All-Star Game during EuroBasket 2009. He dominated the game as he scored 18 points, grabbed 19 rebounds, blocked three shots and helped the "Blue Team" beat the "White Team" 77–75. Valančiūnas was later named the MVP of the All-Star game.

One year later, Valančiūnas led the Lithuania national under-18 team to gold medal. Lithuania dominated in the 2010 FIBA Europe Under-18 Championship. He averaged 19.4 points, 13.4 rebounds and 2.7 blocks, and was voted as the MVP.

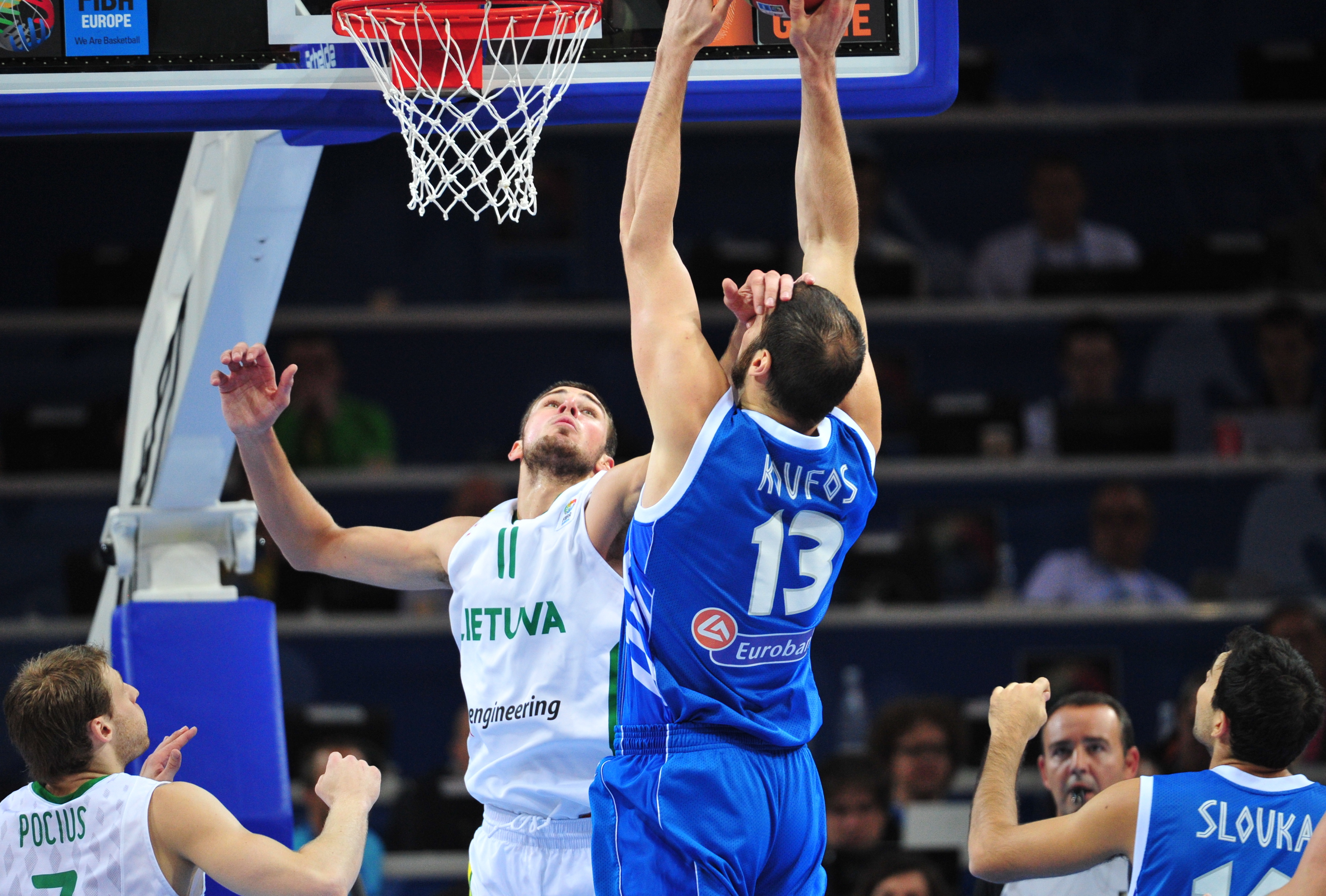
Valančiūnas versus Kosta Koufos

Valančiūnas was also a member of the Lithuania under-19 team, which competed in the 2011 FIBA Under-19 World Championship. He helped his team to capture the gold medal, as Valančiūnas averaged 23.0 points, 13.9 rebounds and 3.2 blocks in 31 minutes of game action. He was later named the tournament MVP. Valančiūnas scored 36 points in the gold medal game against Serbia, which was the most points scored in a game by any player in the tournament. As of 2026, he is the only player to achieve an MVP and gold medal in all of his FIBA junior tournaments.

Valančiūnas was on the Lithuania senior team's roster for EuroBasket 2011. He debuted with the team on 6 August 2011 in a match against the Czech Republic, he scored 26 points and grabbed 11 rebounds. After a strong performance in friendly pre-EuroBasket 2011 matches, Valančiūnas was leading Lithuania's team with 12.3 points and 7.3 rebounds per game. Although Valančiūnas struggled in the first four games of EuroBasket 2011 (among them missing the game against Turkey), he then became one of the key players, averaging 8.4 points and 4.1 rebounds in just 15.7 minutes of game action. He also helped Lithuania to claim the fifth spot, which guaranteed qualification for the 2012 FIBA World Olympic Qualifying Tournament. As of 2026, he is the all-time youngest Lithuanian to represent the senior national team at the major tournament.

In 2013, Valančiūnas won a silver medal at EuroBasket 2013. In the 2014 FIBA Basketball World Cup, Valančiūnas led the Lithuanian squad, which finished in fourth place. He was also one of the tournament's best players at EuroBasket 2015, and was chosen to the All-Tournament Team, along with teammate, Jonas Mačiulis, after averaging 16 points and 8.4 rebounds per game. The Lithuanian team won their second consecutive silver medal at the competition.

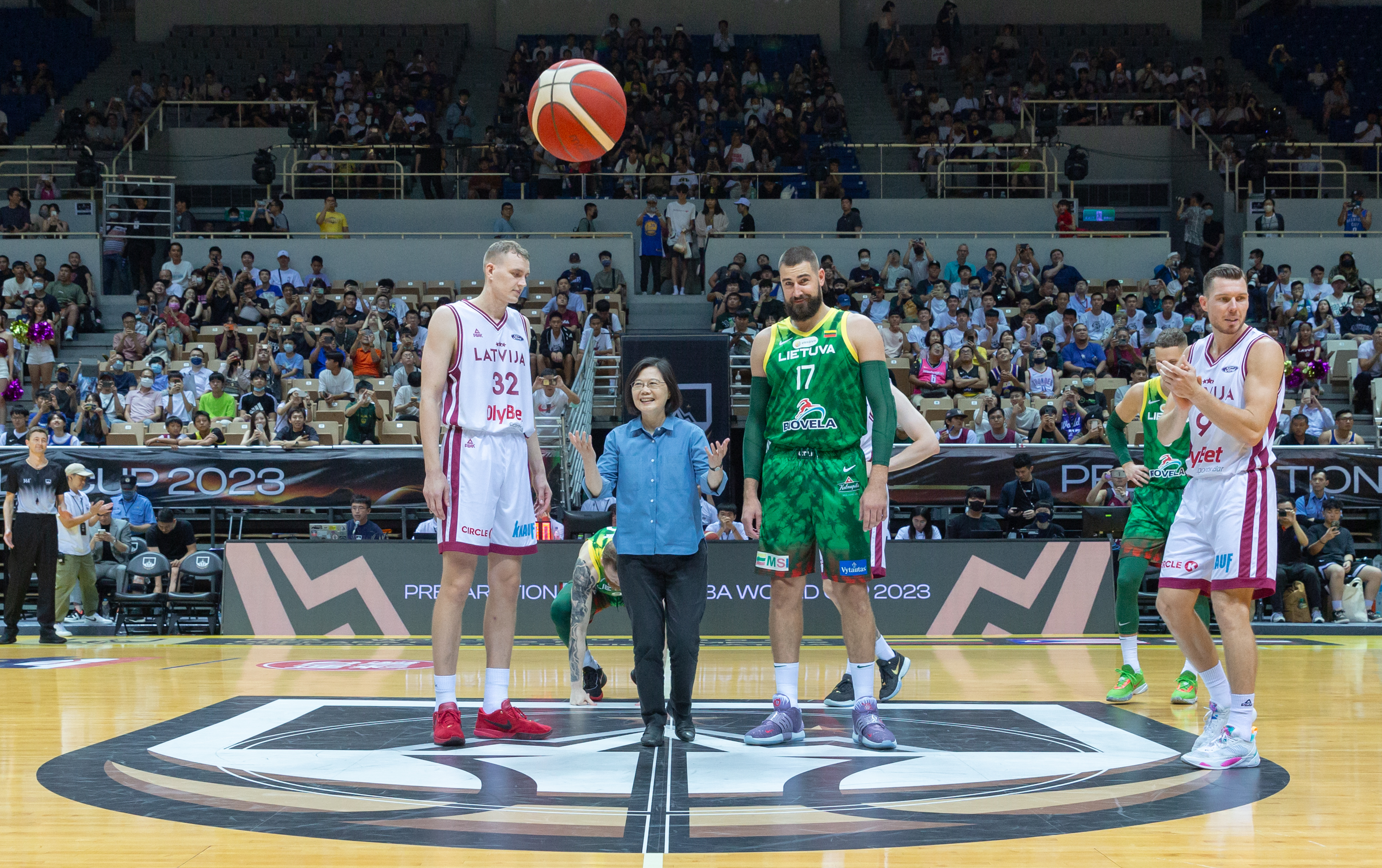
Valančiūnas with Lithuania men's national basketball team in 2023

In 2017, Valančiūnas competed at EuroBasket 2017, where the team finished ninth overall. He averaged 15.8 points and 12 rebounds, while leading the tournament in double-doubles and rebounds per game.

In 2019, Valančiūnas played the 2019 FIBA Basketball World Cup where Lithuania finished ninth overall. Valančiūnas led his team in total points and rebounds, averaging 14.0 points and 8.8 rebounds.

In 2023, Valančiūnas represented the Lithuania at the 2023 FIBA Basketball World Cup where Lithuania finished in sixth place. He averaged 14.8 points, 8.8 rebounds, which included a sensational victory against the United States. He became the second player (with José Ortiz) to have recorded multiple double-doubles in three World Cup tournaments since 1994. In recognition of his individual play, Valančiūnas was named to the All-FIBA World Cup Second Team.

== Career statistics ==
Legend
GP	Games played	GS	Games started	MPG	Minutes per game
FG%	Field goal percentage	3P%	3-point field goal percentage	FT%	Free throw percentage
RPG	Rebounds per game	APG	Assists per game	SPG	Steals per game
BPG	Blocks per game	PPG	Points per game	**Bold**	Career high
*	Led the league	‡	NBA record

=== NBA ===
==== Regular season ====
Year	Team	GP	GS	MPG	FG%	3P%	FT%	RPG	APG	SPG	BPG	PPG
2012–13	Toronto	62	57	23.9	.557	—	.789	6.0	.7	.3	1.3	8.9
2013–14	Toronto	81	81	28.2	.531	.000	.762	8.8	.7	.3	.9	11.3
2014–15	Toronto	80	80	26.2	.572	.000	.786	8.7	.5	.4	1.2	12.0
2015–16	Toronto	60	59	25.9	.565	—	.761	9.1	.7	.4	1.3	12.8
2016–17	Toronto	80	80	25.8	.557	**.500**	.811	9.5	.7	.5	.8	12.0
2017–18	Toronto	77	77	22.4	.568	.405	.806	8.6	1.1	.4	.9	12.7
2018–19	Toronto	30	10	18.8	.575	.300	.819	7.2	1.0	.4	.8	12.8
2018–19	Memphis	19	17	27.7	.545	.278	.769	10.7	2.2	.3	**1.6**	**19.9**
2019–20	Memphis	70	70	26.4	.585	.352	.740	11.3	1.9	.4	1.1	14.9
2020–21	Memphis	62	61	28.3	**.592**	.368	.773	**12.5**	1.8	**.6**	.9	17.1
2021–22	New Orleans	74	74	**30.3**	.544	.361	.820	11.4	**2.6**	**.6**	.8	17.8
2022–23	New Orleans	79	79	24.9	.547	.349	.826	10.2	1.8	.3	.7	14.1
2023–24	New Orleans	**82**	**82***	23.5	.559	.308	.785	8.8	2.1	.4	.8	12.2
2024–25	Washington	49	12	20.0	.547	.259	**.896**	8.2	2.2	.4	.6	11.5
2024–25	Sacramento	32	9	16.9	.556	.100	.847	7.0	1.8	.5	.6	8.7
2025–26	Denver	65	6	13.4	.582	.308	.772	5.1	1.2	.2	.6	8.7
Career		1,002	854	24.4	.561	.340	.793	9.0	1.4	.4	.9	12.8

==== Playoffs ====
Year	Team	GP	GS	MPG	FG%	3P%	FT%	RPG	APG	SPG	BPG	PPG
2014	Toronto	7	7	28.6	.633	—	.636	9.7	.3	.0	1.0	10.9
2015	Toronto	4	4	26.4	.500	—	**.875**	9.3	.5	.5	.3	11.3
2016	Toronto	**12**	**10**	26.7	.567	—	.744	10.8	.9	**.8**	1.2	13.8
2017	Toronto	10	6	22.6	.543	.000	.727	6.7	.2	.2	.6	11.2
2018	Toronto	10	9	24.4	.542	**.400**	.824	10.5	1.2	.4	**1.5**	14.6
2021	Memphis	5	5	**33.1**	.569	.250	**.875**	9.8	2.6	.6	.6	**15.0**
2022	New Orleans	6	6	29.1	.485	.167	.769	**14.3**	**3.0**	.7	.2	14.5
2024	New Orleans	4	4	22.4	.524	.000	.824	11.0	1.3	.5	.0	14.5
2026	Denver	4	0	6.3	**.714**	—	.500	2.3	.3	.0	.3	2.8
Career		62	51	25.0	.549	.238	.762	9.6	1.1	.4	.8	12.5

=== EuroLeague ===
*	Led the league

Year	Team	GP	GS	MPG	FG%	3P%	FT%	RPG	APG	SPG	BPG	PPG	PIR
2010–11	Lietuvos Rytas	15	8	15.4	.708*	—	.885	5.8	.2	.2	.7	7.7	9.7
Career		15	8	15.4	.708	—	.885	5.8	.2	.2	.7	7.7	9.7

== Personal life ==
Valančiūnas and his wife, Eglė Ačaitė, have two sons.

Valančiūnas is the face of the "Itty Bitty Ballers" campaign, marketing miniature figurines with a basketball theme. The proceeds from the sale of the "Itty Bitty Ballers" goes to the MLSE Foundation charity. He also has his own charity foundation, the Jonas Valančiūnas Foundation, which was established in May 2017. It is a non-profit organization with an aim to help adolescents with behavioral challenges. His foundation opened adolescent's day home "Išvien” (United) in August 2018.

=== Acting appearances ===
In 2012, Valančiūnas appeared in two basketball documentaries, The Other Dream Team and We Are... for the Lithuania!. In 2016, he played a village thief in the Lithuanian black comedy What's Your Emergency 3, in which he steals a plasma TV and a tiny police car.

== State awards ==
- Lithuania: recipient of the Medal of the Order for Merits to Lithuania (2011)
- Lithuania: recipient of the Knight's Cross of the Order for Merits to Lithuania (2015)

== See also ==
- List of NBA career field goal percentage leaders
- List of European basketball players in the United States
