= Mindaugas Katelynas =

Lithuanian basketball player (born 1983)

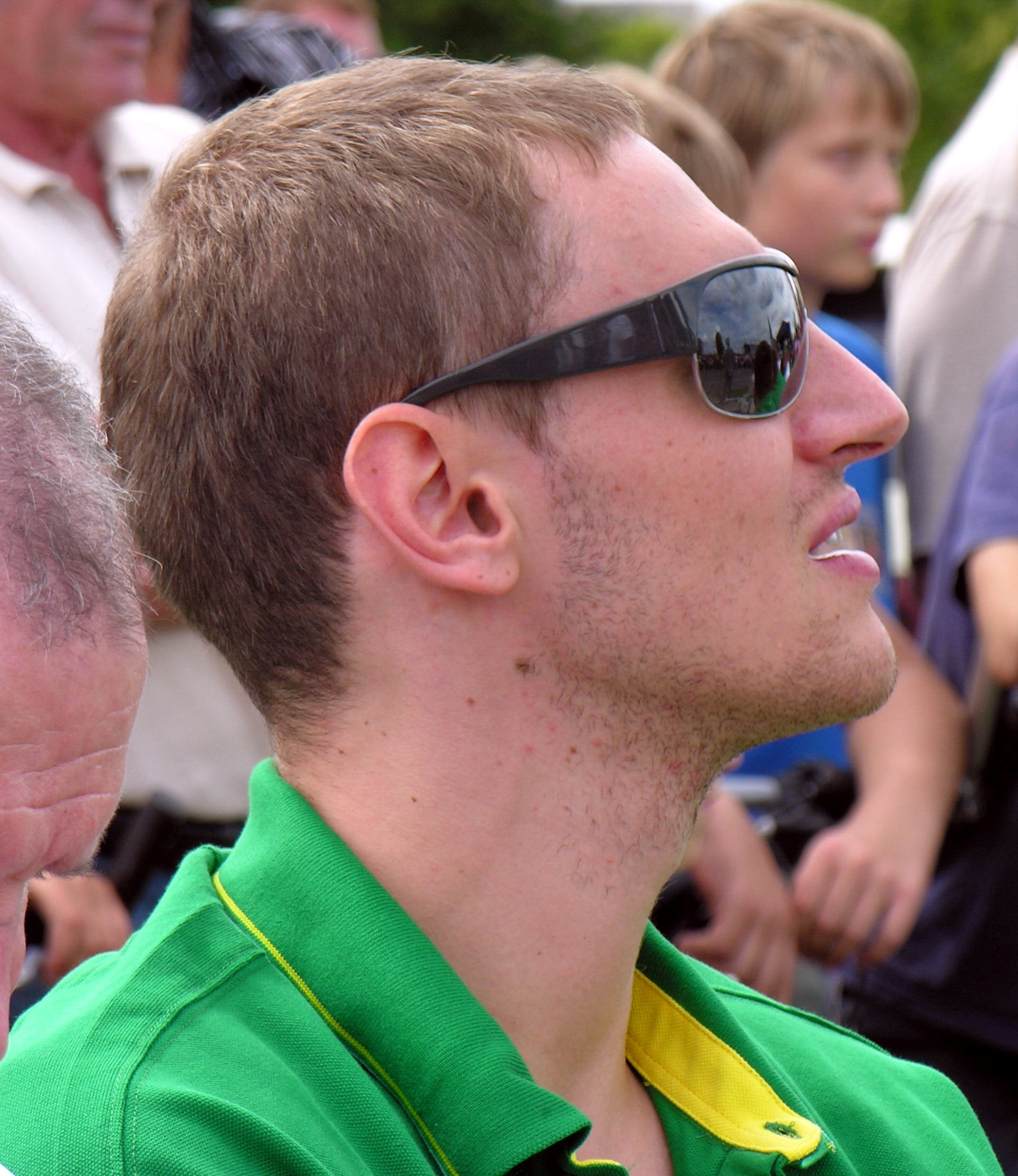
- Katelynas in 2009

Personal information
- Born: May 16, 1983 (age 43) Alytus, Lithuanian SSR, Soviet Union
- Listed height: 6 ft 9 in (2.06 m)
- Listed weight: 225 lb (102 kg)

Career information
- College: USU Eastern (2001–2003); Chattanooga (2003–2005)
- NBA draft: 2005: undrafted
- Playing career: 2005–2014
- Position: Power forward

Career history
- 2005–2006: NGC Cantu
- 2006–2007: Monferrato Casale
- 2007–2009: AJ Milano
- 2009–2010: Meridiano Alicante
- 2010–2011: Cajasol Sevilla
- 2011–2013: Lietuvos Rytas
- 2013: Trabzonspor
- 2014: Brose Baskets

Career highlights
- 2× LKL All-Star (2012, 2013); NCAA Slam-Dunk Contest Champion (2005)

Mindaugas Katelynas (born 16 May 1983) is a Lithuanian professional basketball player.

== Playing career ==
Born in Alytus, Lithuanian SSR, Soviet Union, Katelynas grew up with Alytus youth basketball team. In 2001, he accepted a scholarship at the United States's College of Eastern Utah, which participated in NJCAA tournaments. Two years later, he moved to Tennessee-Chattanooga of NCAA's Division I. While at Chattanooga, Katelynas won the NCAA dunk contest in 2005. After two impressive seasons, Katelynas participated in the 2005 NBA draft camp, but did not go on to the actual draft. He tried his luck again in the NBA by participating in Phoenix Suns summer camp, but he did not receive much acclaim. After such setbacks, Katelynas left for Europe.

He arrived to NGC Cantu for the 2005–06 season. However, he suffered an arm injury during practice and was waived shortly afterwards. He signed a one-year contract with LegADue's A. S. Monferrato Casale. Katelynas averaged his personal best – 12.7 ppg, 8.2 rpg, 1.4 spg while shooting 56% from the field. During the summer of 2007, he participated in Golden State Warriors summer camp. He signed a one-year contract with Armani Jeans Milano in 2007, and extended it to two years in 2008. He was lent to Meridiano Alicante for the 2009–10 season. In August 2010, he signed a two-year contract with Cajasol Sevilla. In August 2011 he moved back to his homeland, signing a three-year deal with BC Lietuvos Rytas. He left the team in August 2013 and signed with the Turkish team Trabzonspor. He terminated the contract with the team in November.

== Career statistics ==
Legend
GP	Games played	GS	Games started	MPG	Minutes per game
FG%	Field-goal percentage	3P%	3-point field-goal percentage	FT%	Free-throw percentage
RPG	Rebounds per game	APG	Assists per game	SPG	Steals per game
BPG	Blocks per game	PPG	Points per game	PIR	Performance index rating
**Bold**	Career high

=== Euroleague ===
Year	Team	GP	GS	MPG	FG%	3P%	FT%	RPG	APG	SPG	BPG	PPG	PIR
2007–08	AJ Milano	11	2	10.2	.520	.333	.500	2.8	.5	.5	.0	3.7	4.0
2008–09	AJ Milano	16	0	14.4	.513	.286	.619	3.4	.8	.4	.2	4.1	4.6
2012–13	Lietuvos Rytas	10	10	22.2	.395	.350	.750	4.4	.6	.5	.4	7.0	6.2

== National team ==
Katelynas was a candidate for the Lithuania national basketball team for Eurobasket 2009, but did not make the final roster. He was a candidate for 2010 FIBA World Championship, but was forced to leave the training camp after suffering a tarsal injury.
