= LKL All-Star Game Most Valuable Player Award =

The LKL All-Star Game Most Valuable Player (MVP) Award, was an annual professional Lithuanian Basketball League (LKL) award, that was given to the player(s) that were voted to be the best of the league's annual All-Star Game. The last winner of this award was Travis Leslie. LKL All-Star Game Most Valuable Player award was replaced by King Mindaugas Cup MVP award in 2016.

== Winners ==
Year	Player	Nationality	Team	Source
All-Star Game
1994	Gintaras Bačianskas	Lithuania	Lietkabelis	
1995	Saulius Štombergas & Patrick Jones	Lithuania & United States	LSU-Atletas & Olimpas	
1996	Rimas Kurtinaitis	Lithuania	Žalgiris	
2000	Mindaugas Timinskas	Lithuania	Žalgiris	
2001	Grigorij Chizniak	Ukraine	Žalgiris	
2002	Robertas Javtokas	Lithuania	Lietuvos Rytas	
2003	Arvydas Macijauskas	Lithuania	Lietuvos Rytas	
2004	Tanoka Beard	United States	Žalgiris	
2005	Tanoka Beard (2×)	United States	Žalgiris	
2006	Simas Jasaitis	Lithuania	Lietuvos Rytas	
2007	Kareem Rush & Jonas Mačiulis	United States & Lithuania	Lietuvos Rytas & Žalgiris	
2008	Hollis Price	United States	Lietuvos Rytas	
2009	Chuck Eidson	United States	Lietuvos Rytas	
2010	Mindaugas Kuzminskas	Lithuania	Šiauliai	
2011	Jonas Valančiūnas	Lithuania	Lietuvos Rytas	
2012	Jonas Valančiūnas (2×)	Lithuania	Lietuvos Rytas	
2013	Kšyštof Lavrinovič & Darjuš Lavrinovič	Lithuania	Žalgiris	
2014	Justin Dentmon	United States	Žalgiris	
2015	Travis Leslie	United States	Lietuvos Rytas	

== Players with most awards ==
Player	Awards	Editions
(United States) Tanoka Beard	2	2004, 2005
(Lithuania) Jonas Valančiūnas	2	2011, 2012

== See also ==
- LKL All-Star Game
- LKL All-Star Day
- LKL Three-point Shootout
- LKL Slam Dunk Contest
- King Mindaugas Cup
- King Mindaugas Cup MVP
