= Saulius Štombergas =

Lithuanian basketball player

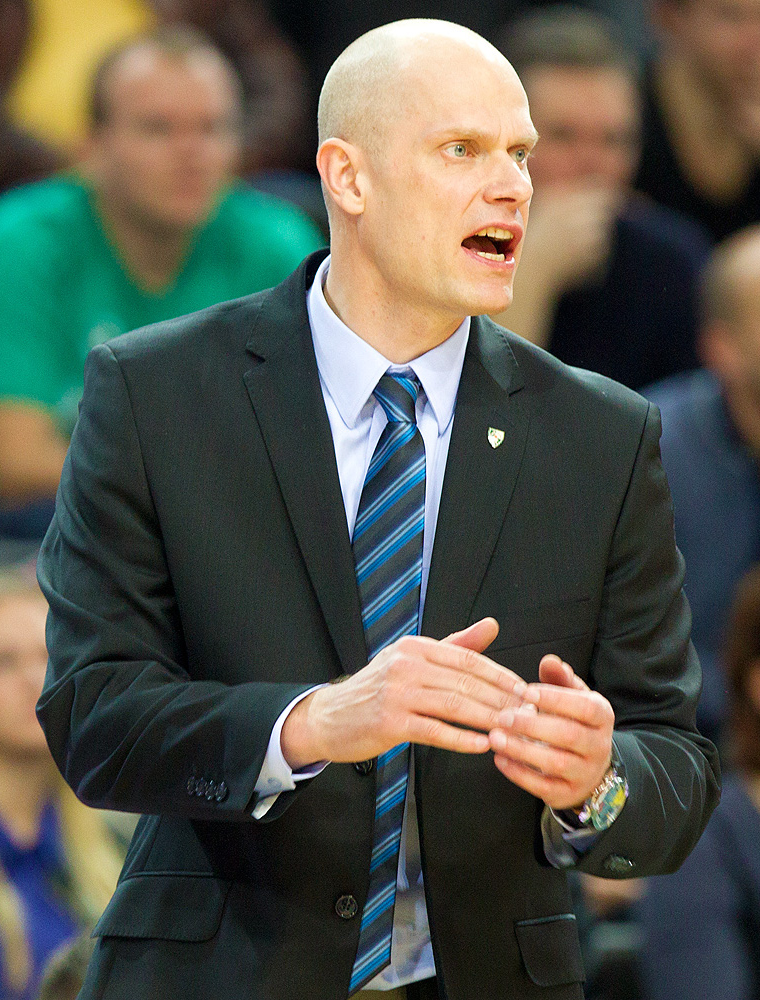
- Štombergas, while coaching, in 2013.

Personal information
- Born: December 14, 1973 (age 52) Klaipėda, Lithuanian SSR, Soviet Union
- Listed height: 6 ft 8.5 in (2.04 m)
- Listed weight: 220 lb (100 kg)

Career information
- Playing career: 1992–2010
- Position: Small forward
- Number: 7
- Coaching career: 2011–2014

Career history

Playing
- 1992–1993: Žalgiris Kaunas
- 1993–1997: Atletas Kaunas
- 1996–1997: Shanghai Sharks
- 1997–1999: Žalgiris Kaunas
- 1999–2000: Kinder Bologna
- 2000–2001: TAU Cerámica Vitoria
- 2001–2002: Efes Pilsen Istanbul
- 2002–2003: Žalgiris Kaunas
- 2003–2004: Unics Kazan
- 2004–2005: Ülker Istanbul
- 2005–2007: Unics Kazan
- 2007–2008: Naglis-Adakris Palanga
- 2009–2010: Unics Kazan

Coaching
- 2011: Žalgiris-Arvydas Sabonis school Kaunas
- 2011–2013: Žalgiris Kaunas (assistant)
- 2013–2014: Žalgiris Kaunas

Career highlights
- As player: EuroLeague champion (1999); FIBA EuroStar (1998); FIBA Saporta Cup champion (1998); FIBA Saporta Cup Finals MVP (1998); FIBA Saporta Cup Finals Top Scorer (1998); FIBA EuroChallenge champion (2004); FIBA EuroChallenge All-Star (2004); Spanish All-Star Game (2001); Turkish League champion (2002); 2× Turkish Cup winner (2002, 2005); Turkish Super Cup winner (2004); Turkish All-Star Game (2005); 3× Lithuanian LKL League champion (1998, 1999, 2003); 5× Lithuanian All-Star Game (1995, 1996, 1998, 1999, 2003); Lithuanian All-Star Game MVP (1995); North European League champion (1999)
Medals
Men's basketball
Representing Lithuania
Olympic Games
Bronze medal – third place	1996 Atlanta
Bronze medal – third place	2000 Sydney
EuroBasket
Silver medal – second place	1995 Athens
Gold medal – first place	2003 Sweden
FIBA Europe U18 Championship
Bronze medal – third place	2015 Greece	under-18

Saulius Štombergas (born December 14, 1973) is a Lithuanian former professional basketball player, coach and businessman. Štombergas is widely considered to be among the greatest Lithuanian basketball players of all time, known for his leadership and 3-point shooting ability.

== Professional career ==
Štombergas' club teams during his playing career, were, in the order in which he played for them: Atletas Kaunas, Vostok Shanghai (Chinese CBA), Žalgiris Kaunas, Kinder Bologna, TAU Cerámica Vitoria, Efes Pilsen Istanbul, Unics Kazan, and Ülker Istanbul. He holds the record in the EuroLeague, since the year 2000, for the most 3-point field goals made in a game, without a miss.

== National team career ==
Štombergas played for the senior men's Lithuanian national basketball team, from 1995 to 2004.

During the 11 years that he played as a Lithuanian international national team player, he played in 97 official games, and scored 1,036 points, for his home country. He won two bronze medals at the Summer Olympic Games, in 1996, and 2000. He also won a silver medal at the EuroBasket 1995, and as the captain of the senior national team, he won the gold medal of the same competition, in 2003. He was also named to the All-Tournament Team.

He also played at the EuroBasket 1997, the 1998 FIBA World Championship, the EuroBasket 1999, the EuroBasket 2001, and the 2004 Summer Olympic Games. He was the flag bearer for Team Lithuania, at the 2004 Olympics.

== Coaching career ==
After he retired from playing professional basketball, Štombergas began his career as a basketball coach in 2011. He worked as a head coach for BC Žalgiris-2 in the NKL, before joining BC Žalgiris as an assistant coach for the 2012–2013 season. He briefly served as head coach in the 2013–2014 season, before resigning in April after disappointing results.

== Career player statistics ==
Legend
GP	Games played	GS	Games started	MPG	Minutes per game
FG%	Field-goal percentage	3P%	3-point field-goal percentage	FT%	Free-throw percentage
RPG	Rebounds per game	APG	Assists per game	SPG	Steals per game
BPG	Blocks per game	PPG	Points per game	PIR	Performance index rating
**Bold**	Career high

=== EuroLeague ===
Year	Team	GP	GS	MPG	FG%	3P%	FT%	RPG	APG	SPG	BPG	PPG	PIR
2000–01	TAU Cerámica	**22**	20	27.2	**.520**	**.512**	.827	2.4	.7	.9	**.2**	12.0	10.5
2001–02	Efes Pilsen	20	19	27.3	.493	.487	.770	3.0	1.2	**1.6**	.1	11.6	10.1
2002–03	Žalgiris	14	13	**30.0**	.475	.415	**.886**	**4.1**	**1.3**	.6	.1	**13.6**	**12.1**
2004–05	Ülker	**22**	**22**	29.5	.405	.299	.838	3.5	1.0	1.3	.1	10.3	7.9
Career		78	74	28.5	.469	.420	.825	3.2	1.0	1.2	.1	11.7	10.0

== Awards and honors ==
=== Pro clubs ===
- 5× Lithuanian All-Star Game: 1995, 1996, 1998, 1999, 2003
- Lithuanian All-Star Game MVP: 1995
- FIBA Saporta Cup Champion: 1998
- FIBA Saporta Cup Finals MVP: 1998
- FIBA Saporta Cup Finals Top Scorer: 1998
- 3× Lithuanian League Champion: 1998, 1999, 2003
- FIBA EuroStar: 1998
- North European League Champion: 1999
- EuroLeague champion: 1999
- Spanish League All-Star Game: 2001
- 2× Turkish Cup Winner: 2002, 2005
- Turkish League Champion: 2002
- FIBA Europe League (FIBA EuroChallenge) All-Star: 2004
- FIBA Europe League (FIBA EuroChallenge) Champion: 2004
- Turkish Super Cup Winner: 2004
- Turkish League All-Star Game: 2005

=== Lithuanian senior national team ===
- 1995 EuroBasket: Silver
- 1996 Summer Olympic Games: Bronze
- 1998 Goodwill Games: Bronze
- 2000 Summer Olympic Games: Bronze
- 2003 EuroBasket: Gold
- 2003 EuroBasket: All-Tournament Team

=== State awards ===
- Lithuania: Recipient of the Medal of the Order of the Lithuanian Grand Duke Gediminas (1995)
- Lithuania: Recipient of the Commander's Cross of the Order of the Lithuanian Grand Duke Gediminas (1996)
- Lithuania: Recipient of the Grand Cross of the Order for Merits to Lithuania (2003)

Olympic Games
Preceded by Romas Ubartas	Flagbearer for Lithuania; Athens 2004	Succeeded by Šarūnas Jasikevičius
