= Mindaugas Kuzminskas =

Lithuanian basketball player (born 1989)

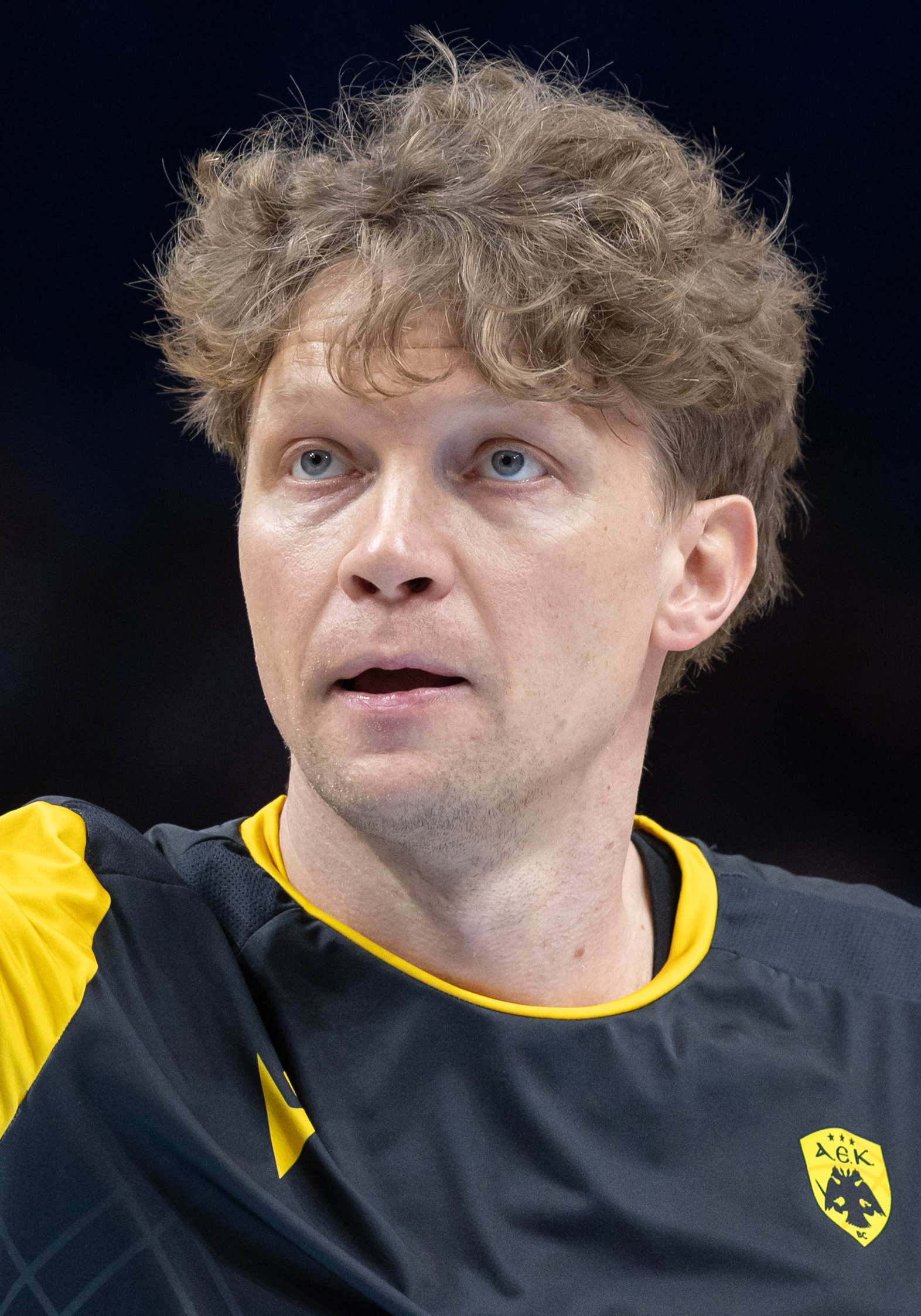
- Kuzminskas in 2026

Free agent
- Position: Power forward / small forward

Personal information
- Born: 19 October 1989 (age 37) Vilnius, Lithuania
- Listed height: 6 ft 9 in (2.06 m)
- Listed weight: 215 lb (98 kg)

Career information
- NBA draft: 2011: undrafted
- Playing career: 2006–present

Career history
- 2006–2007: Sakalai
- 2007–2008: Perlas
- 2008–2010: Šiauliai
- 2010–2013: Žalgiris Kaunas
- 2009-2010: → Šiauliai
- 2013–2016: Málaga
- 2016–2017: New York Knicks
- 2018–2019: Olimpia Milano
- 2019: Olympiacos
- 2019–2021: Lokomotiv Kuban
- 2021–2022: Zenit Saint Petersburg
- 2022–2023: Karşıyaka
- 2023–2026: AEK Athens

Career highlights
- Greek All-Star (2023); VTB United League All-Star (2020); LBA champion (2018); Supercoppa champion (2018); 2× All-VTB United League Second Team (2013, 2021); Lithuanian Basketball Player of the Year (2016); 4× LKL All-Star (2010–2013); LKL All-Star Game MVP (2010); LKF Cup winner (2011); BBL champion (2011); 3× LKL champion (2011, 2012, 2013); LKL Finals MVP (2013)
- Stats at NBA.com
- Stats at Basketball Reference
Medals
Men's basketball
Representing Lithuania
EuroBasket
Silver medal – second place	2013 Slovenia
Silver medal – second place	2015 France–Croatia–Germany–Latvia

Mindaugas Kuzminskas (born 19 October 1989) is a Lithuanian professional basketball player. He also formerly represented the Lithuanian national team in international competition. He is 2.05 m (6'8 3/4") tall, and he can play at both the small forward and power forward positions.

== Professional career ==
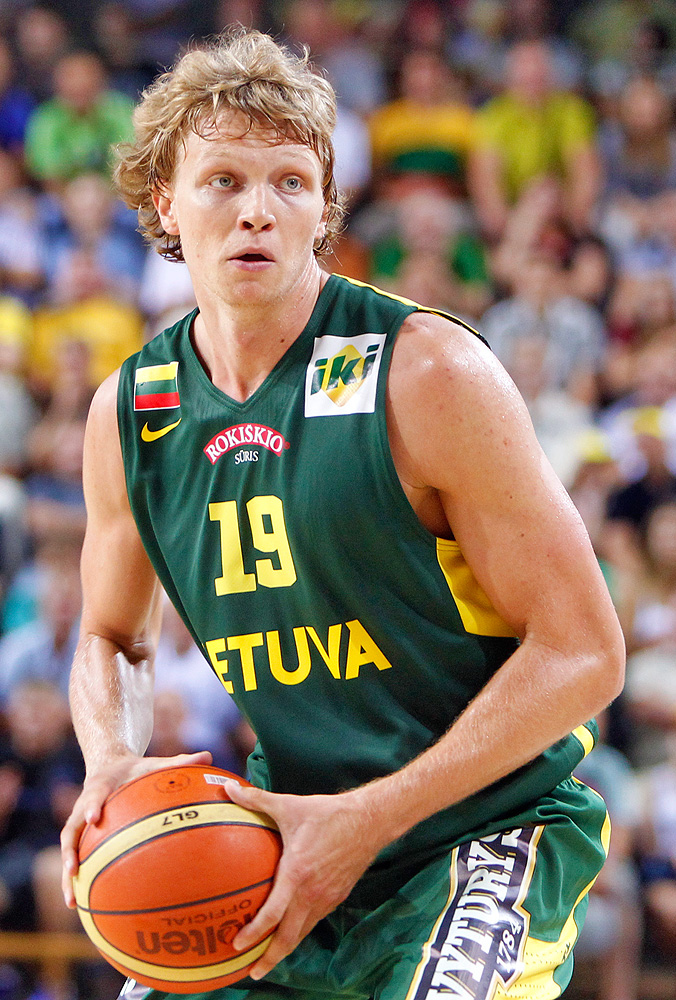
Kuzminskas with Lithuanian national team.

=== Europe ===
Kuzminskas started his basketball career in 2006 with Sakalai where he played for one season. For the 2007–08 season, he moved to Perlas. In the summer of 2008, he signed with Šiauliai.

In September 2009, Kuzminskas signed with Žalgiris, but he stayed one more season on loan with Šiauliai. In 2010, he joined Žalgiris and stayed with the team for three seasons.

In June 2013, Kuzminskas signed a contract with the Spanish team Unicaja. On 22 October 2015, Kuzminskas scored his EuroLeague career-high 23 points and led his team to triumph versus the Maccabi Tel Aviv 93–82 in Tel Aviv. Then on 13 November, Kuzminskas played his most efficient EuroLeague game of 30 PIR points (22 points (2FG: 6/7, 3FG: 3/5, FT: 1/1), 4 rebounds, 3 steals) and led Unicaja to another outstanding away-game victory, this time against CSKA Moscow, winning 86–78. In 36 league games for Unicaja in 2015–16, he averaged 10.3 points, 3.0 rebounds and 1.1 assists per game.

=== NBA ===
On 9 July 2016, Kuzminskas signed with the New York Knicks. On 25 October, he made his debut for the Knicks in their season opener, scoring seven points in nine minutes off the bench in a 117–88 loss to the Cleveland Cavaliers. On 3 January 2017, Kuzminskas was selected as the 2016 Lithuanian Basketball Player of the Year. On 12 January 2017, he scored a season-high 19 points in a 104–89 win over the Chicago Bulls.

On 12 November 2017, Kuzminskas was waived by the Knicks to make room for the return of the suspended Joakim Noah. He appeared in 68 games during his rookie season, but just one game to begin his second season.

=== Return to Europe ===
On 1 January 2018, Kuzminskas signed with the Italian club Olimpia Milano. On 1 July 2019, Kuzminskas parted ways with Olimpia Milano after a season and a half playing for them and winning one Italian championship.

On 22 July 2019, Kuzminskas signed a two-year contract with Greek club Olympiacos. On 9 November 2019, with playing time declining since October, Kuzminskas was released from the Greek club.

On 11 November 2019, Kuzminskas signed a €1.5 million deal with Lokomotiv Kuban. Kuzminskas was selected to the 2020 VTB United League All-Star Game where he scored 14 points, grabbed 1 rebound and dished out 4 assists. During the 2020–21 season, Kuzminskas averaged 13 points και 4.5 rebounds in 40 games in the VTB United League and the EuroCup.

On 5 July 2021 he signed with the Russian team Zenit Saint Petersburg of the VTB United League and the EuroLeague. He left the team after the 2022 Russian invasion of Ukraine.

On 21 September 2022 he signed with Pınar Karşıyaka of the Basketbol Süper Ligi (BSL).

On July 22, Kuzminskas joined AEK Athens. In the end of the season, he renewed his contract with the club until 2026.

== Career statistics ==
Legend
GP	Games played	GS	Games started	MPG	Minutes per game
FG%	Field-goal percentage	3P%	3-point field-goal percentage	FT%	Free-throw percentage
RPG	Rebounds per game	APG	Assists per game	SPG	Steals per game
BPG	Blocks per game	PPG	Points per game	PIR	Performance index rating
**Bold**	Career high

=== EuroLeague ===
Year	Team	GP	GS	MPG	FG%	3P%	FT%	RPG	APG	SPG	BPG	PPG	PIR
2010–11	Žalgiris	8	1	6.8	.357	.167	.667	1.0	.1	.3	.0	1.6	1.3
2011–12	Žalgiris	12	0	8.4	**.555**	.143	.706	1.3	.2	.2	.0	2.8	2.8
2012–13	Žalgiris	23	5	14.1	.527	.324	.829	3.1	.3	.5	.2	7.1	7.7
2013–14	Unicaja	24	16	14.2	.472	.314	.633	2.3	.5	.5	.3	6.3	5.6
2014–15	Unicaja	24	**20**	**21.8**	.450	.275	.813	**4.5**	**1.5**	**.9**	.4	10.0	**12.5**
2015–16	Unicaja	23	**20**	21.3	.486	.377	.827	3.4	1.0	.6	.3	**12.0**	11.6
2017–18	Olimpia	14	13	21.6	.474	.432	.795	2.4	1.4	.5	**.6**	10.9	9.6
2018–19	Olimpia	**30**	1	17.0	.514	**.469**	**.859**	3.3	.7	.5	.3	8.5	8.8
Career		158	76	16.5	.475	.359	.800	3.0	.8	.5	.2	8.1	8.3

=== Eurocup ===
Year	Team	GP	GS	MPG	FG%	3P%	FT%	RPG	APG	SPG	BPG	PPG	PIR
2019–20	Lokomotiv	4	0	23.3	.500	.385	.846	2.0	1.5	.5	.3	12.5	11
2020–21	Lokomotiv	19	15	26.4	.550	.344	.775	4.4	1.5	.3	.7	12.4	13.6

=== NBA ===
==== Regular season ====
Year	Team	GP	GS	MPG	FG%	3P%	FT%	RPG	APG	SPG	BPG	PPG
2016–17	New York	**68**	**5**	**14.9**	**.428**	**.321**	**.809**	**1.9**	**1.0**	**.4**	**.2**	**6.3**
2017–18	New York	1	0	2.0	.000	—	—	.0	.0	.0	.0	.0
Career		69	5	14.8	.426	.321	.809	1.8	1.0	.4	.2	6.2

== Personal life ==
Both of Kuzminskas' parents were professional athletes, his father, Vladas, played table tennis, while his mother, Zita, was a professional basketball player. He also has an older brother, Saulius, who was also a professional basketball player between 1999 and 2015. When Kuzminskas was 13 he visited Canada. During his trip to Canada, he toured the Toronto Raptors' arena and went to Kretinga, a Lithuanian Youth Summer Camp in Wasaga Beach, Ontario. In 2017, after 6 years of dating, he married Lithuanian ballet dancer Eglė Andreikaitė. The couple announced their separation in 2019.

=== Don't Snooze On Kuz ===
While in the NBA, a fan-made Instagram account entitled "dontsnoozeonkuz" gained popularity through various satirical and serious postings about Kuzminskas. The account mainly focused on promoting Kuzminskas as a basketball player, and frequently requested his then-current team, the New York Knicks, to increase his playing time. Kuzminskas followed "dontsnoozeonkuz," which has amassed over 1,200 followers as of 29 June 2017. "Dontsnoozeonkuz" is still active today despite the end of Kuzminskas' NBA tenure.

== State awards ==
- Lithuania: Recipient of the Knight's Cross of the Order for Merits to Lithuania (2013)
