= Rimas Kurtinaitis =

Lithuanian basketball player and coach

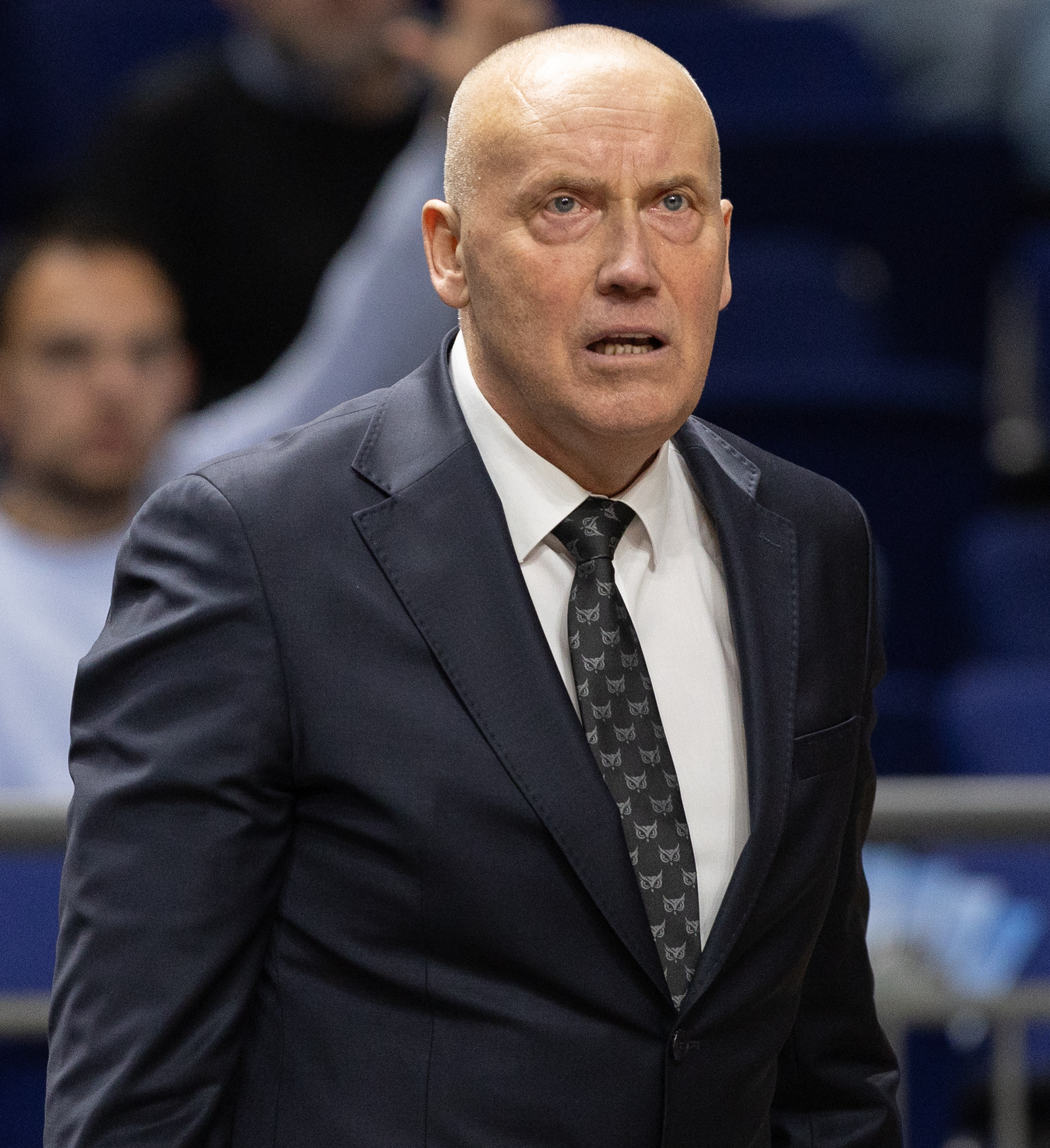
- Kurtinaitis as the head coach of Sabah BC, 2025

Personal information
- Born: 15 May 1960 (age 66) Kaunas, Lithuania
- Listed height: 6 ft 5 in (1.96 m)
- Listed weight: 207 lb (94 kg)

Career information
- NBA draft: 1982: undrafted
- Playing career: 1981–2006
- Position: Shooting guard
- Number: 10, 12
- Coaching career: 2002–present

Career history

Playing
- 1981–1983: CSKA Moscow
- 1983–1989: Žalgiris Kaunas
- 1989–1992: BBV Hagen
- 1992: Žalgiris Kaunas
- 1992: Peñas Huesca
- 1993: Townsville Suns
- 1993–1995: Real Madrid
- 1995–1996: Žalgiris Kaunas
- 1996–1997: Élan Chalon
- 1997–1998: Atletas Kaunas
- 1998–1999: Lietuvos rytas Vilnius
- 2001–2002: Kyiv
- 2002–2006: Gala Baku (Note: As a player-coach)

Coaching
- 2002–2006: Gala Baku
- 2006: Ural Great
- 2007: Sakalai Vilnius
- 2007–2008: Śląsk Wrocław
- 2008: Prokom Trefl Sopot (assistant)
- 2008–2010: Lietuvos rytas Vilnius
- 2010–2011: VEF Rīga
- 2011–2016: Khimki
- 2016: Pallacanestro Cantù
- 2017–2018: Lietuvos rytas Vilnius
- 2019–2021: Khimki
- 2022–2023: Wolves
- 2024–2026: Sabah
- 2024–2026: Lithuania

Career highlights
- As a player: FIBA Intercontinental Cup champion (1986); FIBA European Selection Team (1996); FIBA European Cup Winners' Cup Finals Top Scorer (1985); Spanish League champion (1994); 5× USSR Premier League champion (1982, 1983, 1985–1987); USSR Cup winner (1982); German League Top Scorer (1990); German All-Star Game Three-point Champion (1991); Lithuanian LKL League champion (1996); Lithuanian LKL Finals MVP (1996); 2× Lithuanian League All-Star (1996, 1998); Lithuanian All-Star Game MVP (1996); As a head coach: 3× EuroCup champion (2009, 2012, 2015); The Best EuroCup Coach of All Time (2012); VTB United League champion (2011); VTB United League Coach of the Year (2014); VTB United League Hall of Fame (2019); 2× Lithuanian League champion (2009, 2010); 2× Lithuanian Federation Cup winner (2009, 2010); Baltic League champion (2009); 3× Azerbaijan League champion (2024–2026)
Medals
Men's basketball
Representing the Soviet Union
Olympic Games
Gold medal – first place	1988 Seoul
FIBA World Cup
Silver medal – second place	Spain 1986
EuroBasket
Gold medal – first place	1985 West Germany
Bronze medal – third place	1989 Yugoslavia
Friendship Games
Gold medal – first place	1984 Moscow
Representing Lithuania
Olympic Games
Bronze medal – third place	1992 Barcelona
Bronze medal – third place	1996 Atlanta
EuroBasket
Silver medal – second place	1995 Greece
Head coach for Lithuania
FIBA Europe U20 Championship
Silver medal – second place	2005 Russia	under-20
Bronze medal – third place	2004 Czech Republic	under-20

Rimas Kurtinaitis (born 15 May 1960) is a Lithuanian professional basketball coach and former player who was most recently the head coach for Sabah of the Azerbaijan Basketball League (ABL). As a player, he was a member of the senior Soviet Union and Lithuania national teams, and won a gold medal at the 1988 Summer Olympics. During his playing career, at a height of 1.96 m (6 ft 5 in) tall, he played at the shooting guard position. He is the only non-NBA player to ever participate at the NBA All-Star Weekend's Three-Point Contest, doing so in 1989, where he scored 9 points.

== Club playing career ==
Kurtinaitis' former club teams as a player, include Žalgiris Kaunas, CSKA Moscow, and Real Madrid. He was the only European player to participate in the NBA All-Star Weekend's Three-Point Contest, without ever having played in the NBA, by participating in the event in 1989. Kurtinaitis was also the first European player to play as an import, in Australia's National Basketball League (NBL), while playing for the Townsville Suns, in the 1993 NBL season.

During his professional club career, Kurtinaitis won a total of five USSR Premier League championships, in the years 1982, 1983, 1985, 1986, and 1987. He also won the USSR Cup title in 1982. Kurtinaitis was also the Finals Top Scorer of the European-wide 2nd-tier level competition, the FIBA European Cup Winners' Cup's 1984–85 season. Kurtinaitis won the championship of the 1986 edition of the FIBA Intercontinental Cup.

Kurtinaitis was the German BBL league's Top Scorer of the 1989–90 season, and at the German All-Star Game, he won the Three-point Contest in 1991. In addition to that, Kurtinaitis won the Spanish ACB league's championship, during the ACB 1993–94 season. He was the Lithuanian All-Star Game MVP in 1996. After winning the Lithuanian LKL league's championship in 1996, he was named the Finals MVP of the Lithuanian LKL league in 1996. Kurtinaitis was also honored as one of the best players in FIBA Europe's pro league club competitions, when he was chosen as a member of the FIBA European Selection Team in 1996.

== National team playing career ==
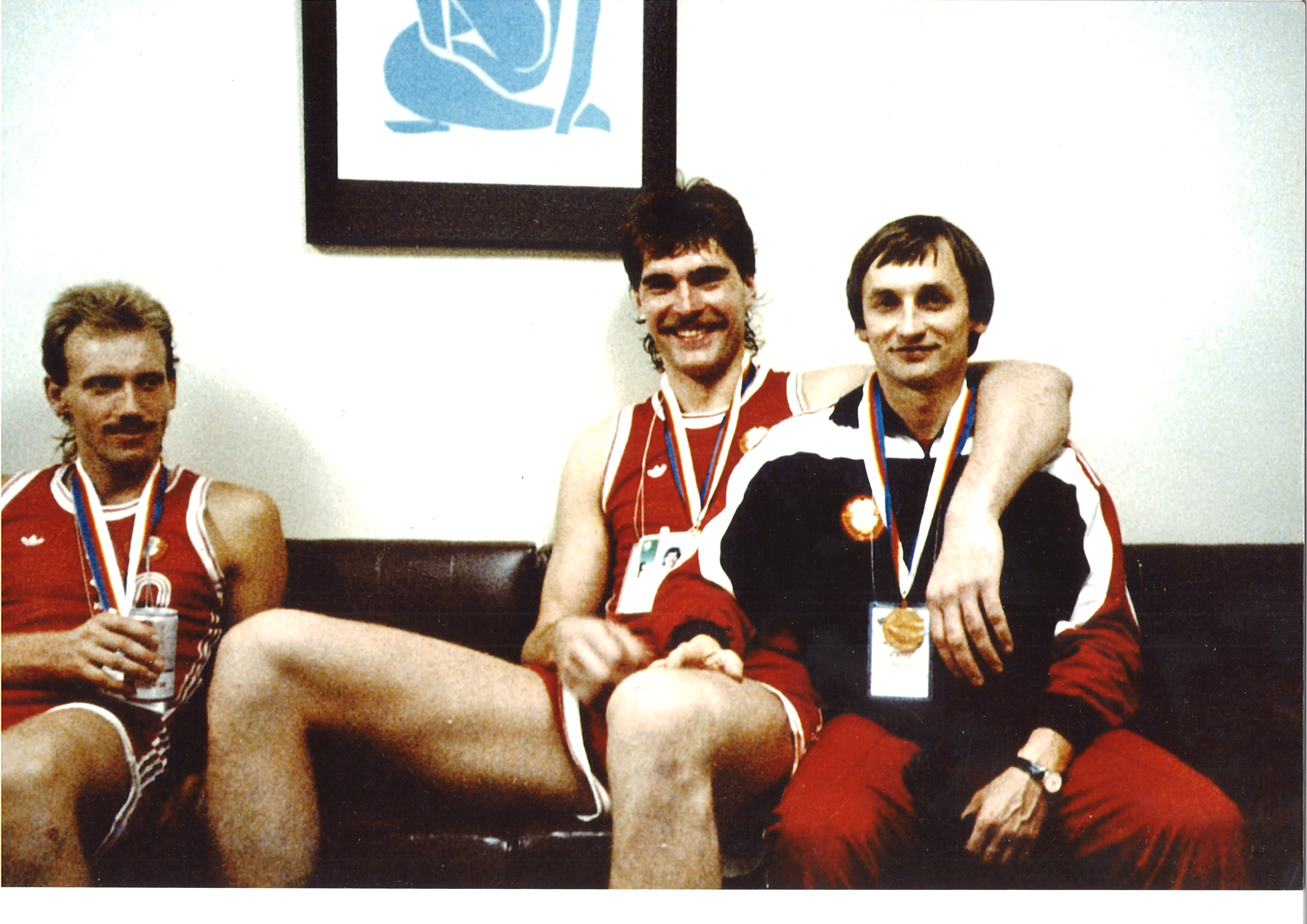
Kurtinaitis (first from the left), sitting alongside teammate Arvydas Sabonis, and Team Doctor Vasily Avramenko, after winning the 1988 Summer Olympics Basketball Tournament, with the Soviet Union men's national team.

=== Soviet Union junior national team ===
Kurtinaitis was a member of the Soviet Union's junior national teams. With the Soviet Union's Under-19 junior national team, Kurtinaitis competed at the 1979 FIBA Under-19 World Championship. The Soviet team came in 5th place at the tournament. During the tournament, Kurtinaitis averaged 2.7 points per game, in a total of 9 games played.

=== Soviet Union senior national team ===
Kurtinaitis was also a member of the senior men's Soviet Union national team. With the Soviet Union senior national teams, Kurtinaitis won the gold medal at the 1984 Friendship Games, the gold medal at the 1985 FIBA EuroBasket, the silver medal at the 1986 FIBA World Championship, the gold medal at the 1988 Seoul Summer Olympic Games, and the bronze medal at the 1989 FIBA EuroBasket. Kurtinaitis also represented the Soviet Union at the 1984 FIBA European Olympic Qualifying Tournament, and the 1988 FIBA European Olympic Qualifying Tournament.

=== Lithuanian senior national team ===
Due to the breakup of the Soviet Union, and the subsequent re-establishment of Lithuania, Kurtinaitis became a member of the senior men's Lithuanian national team. With Lithuania, he won the bronze medal at the 1992 Barcelona Summer Olympic Games, the silver medal at the 1995 FIBA EuroBasket, and the bronze medal at the 1996 Atlanta Summer Olympic Games. Kurtinaitis also represented Lithuania at the 1992 FIBA European Olympic Qualifying Tournament, the 1995 FIBA EuroBasket, and the 1996 Atlanta Summer Olympic Games.

== Club coaching career ==
In 1997, Kurtinaitis was named to the Lithuanian Ministry of Sport. From 2002 to 2006, he was a player for four seasons (until the age of 46!), with the Azerbaijani League club Gala Baku, where he also worked as a player-coach. Kurtinaitis became the head coach of the Lithuanian club Sakalai, during the mid-2000s.

In December 2007, he became the head coach of the Polish PLK league club Śląsk Wrocław. In 2008, he became the head coach of the Lithuanian club Lietuvos Rytas, with whom, he won the European-wide 2nd-tier level competition EuroCup's 2008–09 season's championship title. After winning the championship at the Final-Eight Tournament, in Turin (Torino), Italy, in a game against Khimki Moscow Region, by a final score of 80–74.

In 2012, Kurtinaitis won the EuroCup's championship once again, that time with the Russian club Khimki, after claiming the title of the EuroCup 2011–12 season. On 21 June 2012, Kurtinaitis was named "The Best EuroCup Coach of All-Time". On 15 March 2016, Khimki parted ways with Kurtinaitis. On 2 August 2016, Kurtinaitis become the head coach of Cantù, of the Italian LBA league. However, on 30 November 2016, he was fired from the team.

Kurtinaitis agreed to return to Lietuvos rytas on 10 February 2017, following the resignation of Tomas Pačėsas, from the club's head coaching position. That tenure with Rytas was not as successful as his previous one was – as Rytas only finished in 3rd place in the Lithuanian LKL league in the 2016–17 season, after the playoffs stage was completed, which was considered a failure and a fiasco for the team. In the 2017–18 season, the team played much better, as it reached the EuroCup 2017–18 season's Top 16 Phase, as well as the KMT Finals and the 2017–18 Lithuanian League season's LKL Finals. However, the team lost both finals to Žalgiris Kaunas. In what stirred a lot of controversy, it was announced during the semifinals of the LKL, that Kurtinaitis would be replaced by Dainius Adomaitis in the following season, and in June, Kurtinaitis left the team.

On 21 January 2019, Kurtinaitis returned to Khimki, in a surprising decision. Two years later, on 15 January 2021, he was dismissed from the position of Khimki head coach, because of the team's unsatisfactory results. On 26 January 2024, Kurtinaitis became the head coach of Sabah of the Azerbaijan Basketball League.

As of 2025, Kurtinaitis is the only head coach to have won the season championship of the European-wide secondary level competition, the EuroCup, on three separate occasions.

== National team coaching career ==
=== Azerbaijani national team ===
In the years 2002 to 2006, Kurtinaitis was the head coach of the senior men's Azerbaijani national team.

=== Lithuanian national team ===
On 1 October 2024, the Lithuanian Basketball Federation announced Kurtinaitis as the new head coach of the senior men's Lithuanian national team.

== Awards and achievements ==
=== State awards ===
- Lithuania: Recipient of the Officer's Cross of the Order of the Lithuanian Grand Duke Gediminas (1995)
- Lithuania: Recipient of the Commander's Grand Cross of the Order of the Lithuanian Grand Duke Gediminas (1996)
- Lithuania: Recipient of the Commander's Grand Cross of the Order for Merits to Lithuania (2007)

As a player:

=== Pro clubs ===
- 5× USSR Premier League Champion: 1982, 1983, 1985, 1986 1987
- USSR Cup Winner: (1982)
- FIBA European Cup Winners' Cup Finals Top Scorer: (1985)
- FIBA Intercontinental Cup Champion: 1986
- NBA All-Star Weekend Three-Point Contest Participant: 1989
- German League Top Scorer: (1990)
- German All-Star Game Three-point Champion: 1991
- Spanish ACB League Champion: 1994
- 2× Lithuanian League All-Star: 1996, 1998
- Lithuanian All-Star Game MVP: 1996
- Lithuanian League Champion: 1996
- Lithuanian League Finals MVP: 1996
- FIBA European Selection Team: 1996

=== Soviet senior national team ===
- 1985 FIBA EuroBasket: Gold
- 1986 FIBA World Championship: Silver
- 1988 Summer Olympic Games: Gold
- 1989 FIBA EuroBasket: Bronze

=== Lithuanian senior national team ===
- 1992 Summer Olympic Games: Bronze
- 1995 FIBA EuroBasket: Silver
- 1996 Summer Olympic Games: Bronze

=== As a head coach ===
- 3× EuroCup Champion: 2009, 2012, 2015
- 2× Lithuanian LKL League Champion: 2009, 2010
- Baltic BBL League Champion: 2009
- 2× Lithuanian Federation Cup Winner: 2009, 2010
- VTB United League Champion: 2011
- Named Best EuroCup Coach of All Time: 2012
- VTB United League Coach of the Year: 2014
- VTB United League Hall of Fame: 2019
- 3× Azerbaijan League Champion: 2024, 2025, 2026

== Coaching record ==
Legend
G	Games coached	W	Games won	L	Games lost	W–L %	Win-loss %

Note: The EuroLeague is not the only competition in which the team played during the season. He also coached in domestic competition, and regional competition if applicable.

=== EuroLeague ===
Team	Year	G	W	L	W–L%	Result
Lietuvos rytas	2009–10	10	4	6	.400	Eliminated in group stage
Khimki	2012–13	24	13	11	.542	Eliminated in TOP 16 stage
Khimki	2015–16	20	10	10	.500	Fired
Khimki	2018–19	11	2	9	.182	Eliminated in regular season
Khimki	2019–20	28	13	15	.464	Season stopped due to the COVID-19 pandemic
Khimki	2020–21	20	2	18	.100	Fired
Career		113	44	69	.389	

== Filmography ==
Year	Title	Role	Notes	Ref
2012	The Other Dream Team	Himself	Documentary about the Lithuania men's national basketball team at the 1992 Summer Olympics.	
2014	Arvydas Sabonis. 11	Himself	Documentary about Arvydas Sabonis, a teammate of Kurtinaitis in multiple teams.	
2023	Bilietas (The Ticket)	Himself	Documentary about the basketball club Žalgiris Kaunas in 1979–1989.	
