= EuroLeague MVP of the Month =

European basketball award

The EuroLeague MVP of the Month is the award of Europe's premier level basketball league, the EuroLeague, for the most valuable player of each month of the season. The award began in the 2004–05 season, after the EuroLeague eliminated the EuroLeague regular season and EuroLeague top 16 MVP awards. From the 2004–05 season to the 2015–16 season, the EuroLeague awarded an MVP for each month of the season, rather than giving MVP awards for the "regular season stage" (the first group stage of the competition), and the Top 16 stage (the second group stage of the competition), as it had done in earlier seasons.

== EuroLeague Monthly MVPs ==
October	November	December	January	February	March	April
2004–05 season
not awarded	(United States) Anthony Parker (Maccabi)	(Turkey) Serkan Erdoğan (Ülkerspor)	(Greece) Theo Papaloukas (CSKA)	(Slovenia) Jaka Lakovič (Panathinaikos)	(Lithuania) Arvydas Macijauskas (Baskonia)	(United States) Marcus Brown (CSKA)
2005–06 season
not awarded	(Turkey) Kaya Peker (Anadolu Efes)	(Spain) Jorge Garbajosa (Unicaja)	(Spain) Juan Carlos Navarro (Barcelona)	(United States) Tyus Edney (Olympiacos)	(United States) Maceo Baston (Maccabi)	(United States) Trajan Langdon (CSKA)
2006–07 season
not awarded	(United States) Mike Batiste (Panathinaikos)	(Argentina) Luis Scola (Baskonia)	(Greece) Lazaros Papadopoulos (Dynamo Moscow)	(Slovenia) Matjaž Smodiš (CSKA)	(Puerto Rico) Daniel Santiago (Unicaja)	(Lithuania) Ramūnas Šiškauskas (Panathinaikos)
2007–08 season
not awarded	(Lithuania) Arvydas Macijauskas (Olympiacos)	(United States) Marcus Brown (Zalgiris)	(United States) Terence Morris (Maccabi)	(United States) Bootsy Thornton (Siena)	(Belize) Milt Palacio (Partizan)	(Lithuania) Ramūnas Šiškauskas (CSKA)
2008–09 season
(Turkey) Ersan İlyasova (Barcelona)	(Slovenia) Sani Bečirovič (Roma)	(Israel) Lior Eliyahu (Maccabi)	(Serbia) Igor Rakočević (Baskonia)	(Serbia) Novica Veličković (Partizan)	(Slovenia) Erazem Lorbek (Note: Lorbek won the March/April MVP award. It's not two separate awards.) (CSKA)	
2009–10 season
(Serbia) Bojan Popović (Lietuvos Rytas)	(United States) Pete Mickeal (Barcelona)	(Australia) - (Serbia) Aleks Marić (Partizan)	(Serbia) Miloš Teodosić (Olympiacos)	(United States) Alan Anderson (Maccabi)	(Russia) Victor Khryapa (CSKA)	(Spain) Juan Carlos Navarro (Barcelona)
2010–11 season
(Slovenia) Goran Jagodnik (Olimpija)	(United States) Chuck Eidson (Maccabi)	(Greece) Dimitris Diamantidis (Panathinaikos)	(Spain) Juan Carlos Navarro (Barcelona)	(Slovenia) Rasho Nesterovič (Olympiacos)	(United States) Jeremy Pargo (Maccabi)	not awarded
2011–12 season
(Russia) Andrei Kirilenko (CSKA)	(Serbia) Nenad Krstić (CSKA)	(Spain) Nikola Mirotić (Real Madrid)	(Bosnia and Herzegovina) Henry Domercant (UNICS)	(Greece) Vassilis Spanoulis (Olympiacos)	(Greece) Dimitris Diamantidis (Note: Diamantidis won the March/April MVP award. It's not two separate awards.) (Panathinaikos)	
2012–13 season
(United States) Sonny Weems (CSKA)	(Greece) Vassilis Spanoulis (Olympiacos)	(Poland) Maciej Lampe (Baskonia)	(United States) Bobby Brown (Siena)	(Croatia) Ante Tomić (Barcelona)	(United States) Devin Smith (Maccabi)	(Spain) Sergio Llull (Real Madrid)
2013–14 season
(Spain) Nikola Mirotić (Real Madrid)	(United States) Derrick Brown (Lokomotiv Kuban)	(Greece) Stratos Perperoglou (Olympiacos)	(Serbia) Nenad Krstić (CSKA)	(Croatia) Ante Tomić (Barcelona)	(Croatia) Ante Tomić (Barcelona)	(Israel) Alex Tyus (Maccabi)
2014–15 season
(Greece) Vassilis Spanoulis (Olympiacos)	(Croatia) Dario Šarić (Anadolu Efes)	(United States) Devin Smith (Maccabi)	(France) Nando de Colo (CSKA)	(Spain) Rudy Fernández (Real Madrid)	(Serbia) Nemanja Bjelica (Fenerbahçe)	(Greece) Georgios Printezis (Olympiacos)
2015–16 season
(United States) Malcolm Delaney (Lokomotiv Kuban)	(Italy) Nicolò Melli (Brose Baskets)	(Mexico) Gustavo Ayón (Real Madrid)	(Czech Republic) Jan Veselý (Fenerbahçe)	(France) Nando de Colo (CSKA)	(Greece) Ioannis Bourousis (Baskonia)	(United States) Ekpe Udoh (Fenerbahçe)
2016–17 season
(Serbia) Miloš Teodosić (CSKA Moscow)	(Spain) Sergio Llull (Real Madrid)	(Italy) Nicolò Melli (Brose Bamberg)	(Serbia) Ognjen Kuzmić (Crvena zvezda)	(France) Thomas Heurtel (Anadolu Efes)	(United States) Chris Singleton (Panathinaikos)	(Serbia) Bogdan Bogdanović (Fenerbahçe)
2017–18 season
(Slovenia) Luka Dončić (Real Madrid)	(Greece) Nick Calathes (Panathinaikos)	(Lithuania) Paulius Jankūnas (Zalgiris)	(France) Nando de Colo (CSKA)	(Russia) Alexey Shved (Khimki)	(Georgia (country)) Tornike Shengelia (Baskonia)	(United States) Brandon Davies (Zalgiris)
2018–19 season
(Cape Verde) Edy Tavares (Real Madrid)	(Serbia) Vasilije Micić (Anadolu Efes)	(Czech Republic) Jan Veselý (Fenerbahçe)	(Israel) Alex Tyus (Maccabi)	(United States) Mike James (Olimpia Milano)	(Greece) Nick Calathes (Panathinaikos)	(Argentina) Facundo Campazzo (Real Madrid)
2019–20 season
(Spain) Sergio Rodríguez (Olimpia Milano)	(Turkey) Shane Larkin (Anadolu Efes)	(Spain) Nikola Mirotić (Barcelona)	(Turkey) Shane Larkin (Anadolu Efes)	(Spain) Nikola Mirotić (Barcelona)	not awarded	
2020–21 season
(Lithuania) Marius Grigonis (Žalgiris)	(United States) Mike James (CSKA)	(Serbia) Nikola Milutinov (CSKA)	(Czech Republic) Jan Veselý (Fenerbahçe)	(Serbia) Nikola Kalinić (Valencia Basket)	(Spain) Nikola Mirotić (Barcelona)	(United States) Will Clyburn (CSKA)
2021–22 season
(Spain) Nikola Mirotić (Barcelona)	(Cape Verde) Edy Tavares (Real Madrid)	(Spain) Nikola Mirotić (Barcelona)	(France) Guerschon Yabusele (Real Madrid)	(Bulgaria) Sasha Vezenkov (Olympiacos)	(United States) Mike James (AS Monaco)	(Turkey) Shane Larkin (Anadolu Efes)
2022–23 season
(United States) Mike James (AS Monaco)	(Bulgaria) Sasha Vezenkov (Olympiacos)	(Argentina) Luca Vildoza (Crvena zvezda)	(United States) Augustine Rubit (Bayern Munich)	(Bulgaria) Sasha Vezenkov (Olympiacos)	(United States) Wade Baldwin (Maccabi)	(Cape Verde) Edy Tavares (Real Madrid)
2023–24 season
(Georgia (country)) Tornike Shengelia (Virtus Bologna)	(Argentina) Facundo Campazzo (Real Madrid)	(Croatia) Mario Hezonja (Real Madrid)	(Bosnia and Herzegovina) Džanan Musa (Real Madrid)	(United States) Mike James (AS Monaco)	(United States) Wade Baldwin (Maccabi Tel Aviv)	(United States) Kendrick Nunn (Panathinaikos)
2024–25 season
(United States) Kevin Punter (Barcelona)	(North Macedonia) T. J. Shorts (Paris)	(France) Théo Maledon (ASVEL)	(Bulgaria) Sasha Vezenkov (Olympiacos)	(United States) Kendrick Nunn (Panathinaikos)	(Cape Verde) Edy Tavares (Note: Tavares won the March/April MVP award. It's not two separate awards.) (Real Madrid)	
2025–26 season
(France) Sylvain Francisco (Žalgiris)	(United States) Kenneth Faried (Panathinaikos)	(United States) Kevin Punter (Barcelona)	(Bulgaria) Sasha Vezenkov (Olympiacos)	(United States) McKinley Wright IV (Dubai)	(South Sudan) Carlik Jones (Partizan)	not awarded
2026–27 season
(North Macedonia) T. J. Shorts (Valencia Basket)						

== Statistics ==
=== Wins by player ===
Rank	Player	Awards
1.	(Spain) Nikola Mirotić	7
2.	(United States) Mike James	5
2.	(Bulgaria) Sasha Vezenkov	5
4.	(Cape Verde) Edy Tavares	4
5.	(Spain) Juan Carlos Navarro	3
5.	(Turkey) Shane Larkin	3
5.	(Greece) Vassilis Spanoulis	3
5.	(Croatia) Ante Tomić	3
5.	(Czech Republic) Jan Veselý	3
5.	(United States) Marcus Brown	3
5.	(France) Nando de Colo	3

=== Wins by country (player's nationality) ===
Rank	Country	MVP Awards
1.	United States	37
2.	Spain	15
3.	Serbia	13
4.	Greece	12
5.	France	7
5.	Slovenia	7
7.	Lithuania	6
7.	Turkey	6
9.	Bulgaria	5
9.	Croatia	5
11.	Argentina	4
11.	Cape Verde	4

=== Wins by country (club's nationality) ===
Rank	Player	MVP Awards
1.	Spain	41
2.	Greece	24
3.	Russia	23
4.	Turkey	14
5.	Israel	13
6.	Lithuania	7
7.	Italy	6
7.	Serbia	6
9.	France	3
9.	Germany	3
11.	Slovenia	1
11.	United Arab Emirates	1

=== Wins by club ===
	Club	MVP Awards
1.	(Russia) CSKA Moscow	18
2.	(Spain) Real Madrid	16
3.	(Spain) Barcelona	15
4.	(Israel) Maccabi Tel Aviv	13
4.	(Greece) Olympiacos	13
6.	(Greece) Panathinaikos	11
7.	(Turkey) Anadolu Efes	7
8.	(Spain) Baskonia	6
8.	(Turkey) Fenerbahçe	6
10.	(Lithuania) Žalgiris	5
11.	(Serbia) Partizan	4
12.	(France) AS Monaco	3
13.	(Germany) Brose Bamberg	2
13.	(Serbia) Crvena zvezda	2
13.	(Russia) Lokomotiv Kuban	2
13.	(Spain) Málaga	2
13.	(Italy) Olimpia Milano	2
13.	(Italy) Siena	2
13.	(Spain) Valencia Basket	2
20.	13 teams	1

== See also ==
- EuroLeague Awards
- 50 Greatest EuroLeague Contributors
- EuroLeague Basketball 2001–10 All-Decade Team
- EuroLeague MVP of the Week
