= LKL Finals =

Lithuanian basketball championship

Tournament information
- Sport: Basketball
- Month played: June
- Established: 1994
- Administrator: Lietuvos krepšinio lyga
- Format: Best-of-five series
- Teams: 2

The Lietuvos Krepšinio Lyga (LKL) Finals is the championship finals series for the top-tier level professional club basketball league in Lithuania, the LKL, and the conclusion of the league's postseason. The Finals have been played in either a best-of-seven, or a best-of five format. The first LKL Finals series was held in 1994, and was contested by Žalgiris and Atletas, with Žalgiris winning the series 3–1.

Žalgiris Kaunas has been the most successful team, having won 22 out of the 27 LKL Finals series that have been played so far. Lietuvos Rytas Vilnius is the only other team to win the LKL Finals.

== History ==
=== 1994–2000: Early dominance by Žalgiris Kaunas ===
Žalgiris Kaunas won the first 6 LKL Finals series, from 1994 to 1999. The team's dominance in the LKL Finals came to an end in the 2000 LKL Finals, when they lost to Lietuvos Rytas Vilnius. During that same period, Žalgiris had also won the second tier level European-wide FIBA Saporta Cup in the 1997–98 season, and the first tier level European-wide 1999 FIBA EuroLeague Final Four. From 1994 to 2000, Atletas Kaunas was the only other club that came close to winning the LKL Finals, as they won the first two games of the 5 game 1996 LKL Finals.

=== 2000–2010: Lietuvos Rytas Vilnius and Žalgiris rivalry ===
Lietuvos Rytas Vilnius finally ended Žalgiris Kaunas' run of winning the first 6 LKL Finals, when they won the finals in 2000. Over an 11-year period, from 2000 to 2010, all of the LKL Finals were won by the two clubs, with Lietuvos Rytas Vilnius winning 5 LKL Finals series, and Žalgiris Kaunas winning 6 LKL Finals series.

=== 2011–present: Žalgiris Kaunas dominates again ===
Starting with the 2011 LKL Finals, Žalgiris Kaunas began another long run of dominance, winning 10 straight LKL Finals series, from 2011 to 2021.

== LKL Finals series results ==
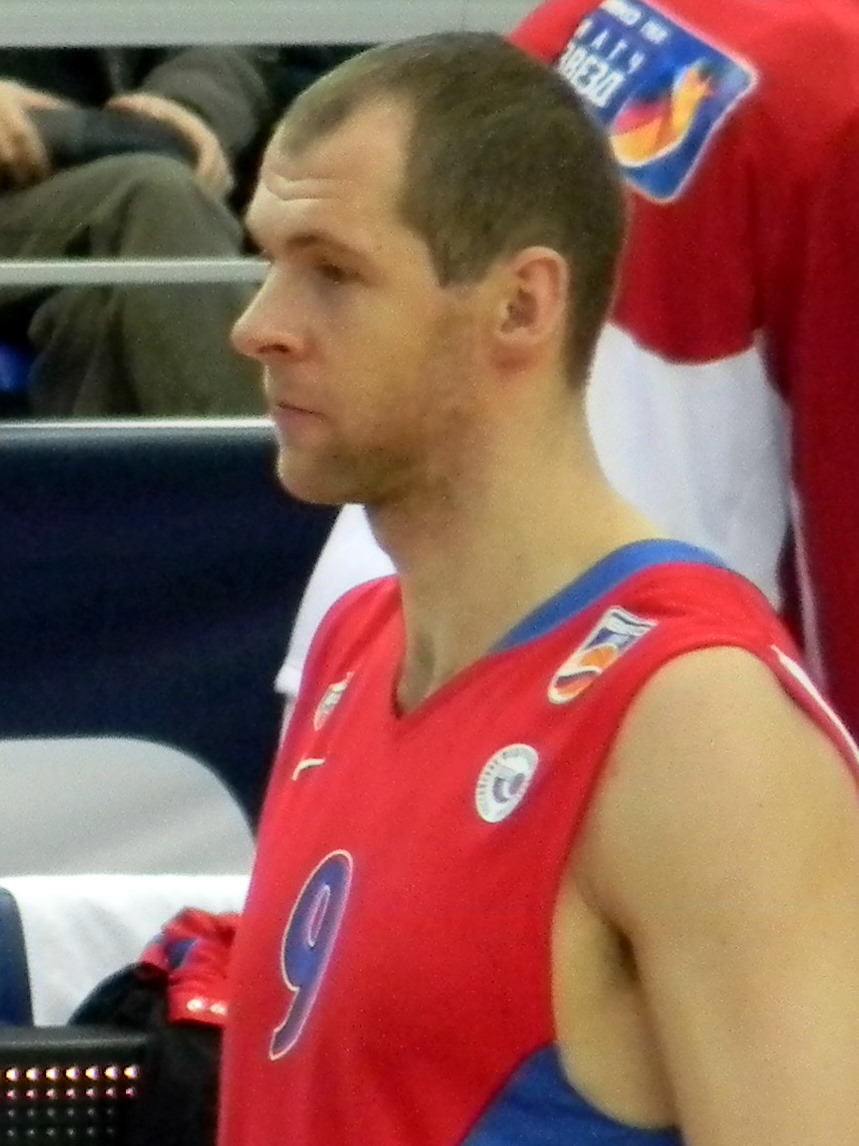
Ramūnas Šiškauskas won 2 LKL Finals, as a player.

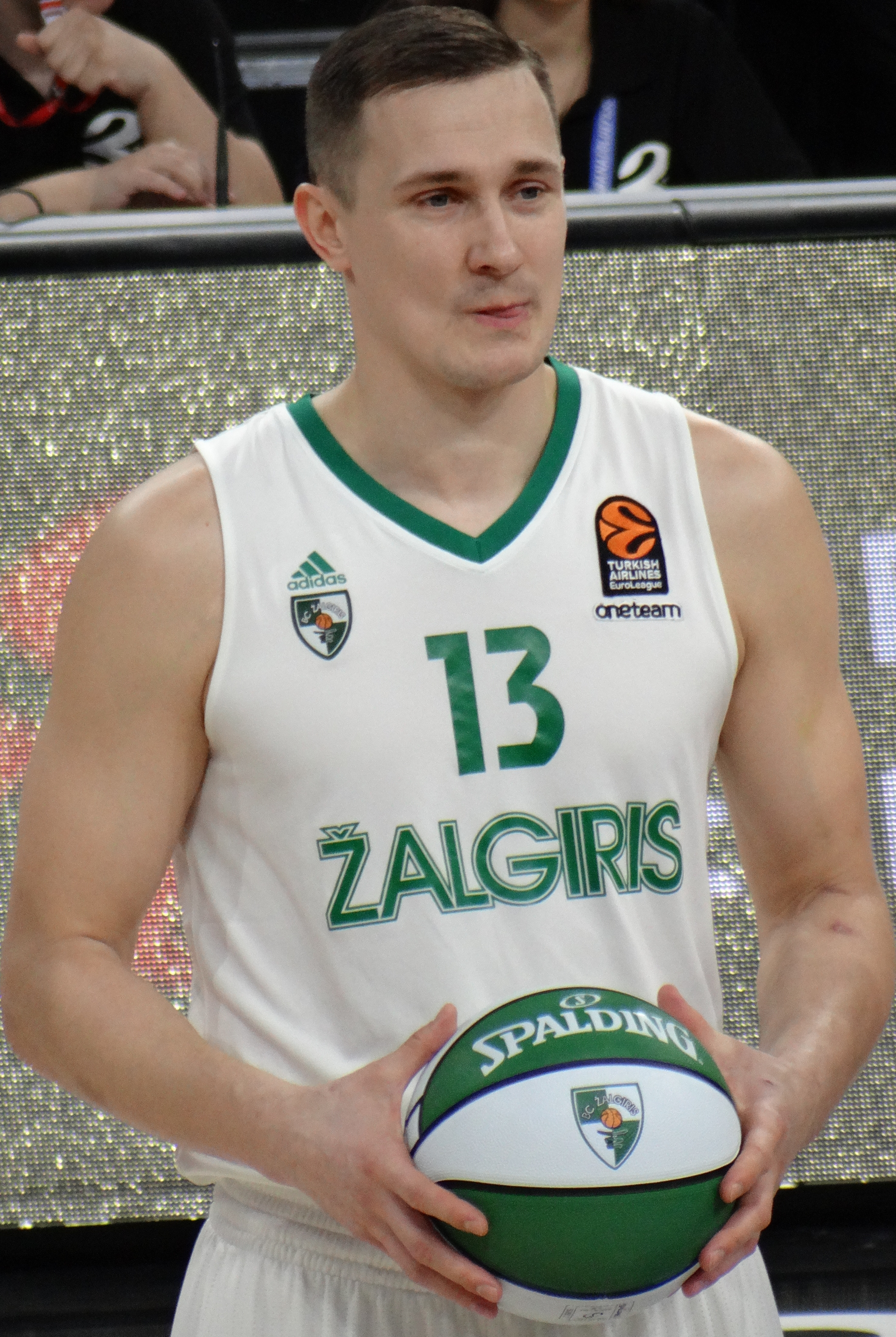
Paulius Jankūnas has won 14 LKL Finals, as a player.

Season	Champion	Result	Runner-up
1994	Žalgiris	3–1	Atletas
1995	Žalgiris	3–0	Atletas
1996	Žalgiris	3–2	Atletas
1997	Žalgiris	3–0	Olimpas
1998	Žalgiris	3–1	Atletas
1999	Žalgiris	3–0	Lietuvos Rytas
2000	Lietuvos Rytas	3–1	Žalgiris
2001	Žalgiris	3–2	Lietuvos Rytas
2002	Lietuvos Rytas	4–3	Žalgiris
2003	Žalgiris	4–2	Lietuvos Rytas
2004	Žalgiris	4–0	Lietuvos Rytas
2005	Žalgiris	4–0	Lietuvos Rytas
2006	Lietuvos Rytas	4–0	Žalgiris
2007	Žalgiris	4–2	Lietuvos Rytas
2008	Žalgiris	4–1	Lietuvos Rytas
2009	Lietuvos Rytas	4–1	Žalgiris
2010	Lietuvos Rytas	4–3	Žalgiris
2011	Žalgiris	4–1	Lietuvos Rytas
2012	Žalgiris	3–0	Lietuvos Rytas
2013	Žalgiris	4–0	Lietuvos Rytas
2014	Žalgiris	4–2	Neptūnas
2015	Žalgiris	4–0	Lietuvos Rytas
2016	Žalgiris	4–1	Neptūnas
2017	Žalgiris	4–1	Lietkabelis
2018	Žalgiris	4–1	Lietuvos Rytas
2019	Žalgiris	3–0	Rytas
2020	Finals were not held		
2021	Žalgiris	3–0	Rytas
2022	Rytas	4–1	Lietkabelis
2023	Žalgiris	3–2	Rytas
2024	Rytas	3–1	Žalgiris
2025	Žalgiris	3–2	Rytas
2026	Žalgiris	3–0	Juventus

== LKL Finals won by head coach ==
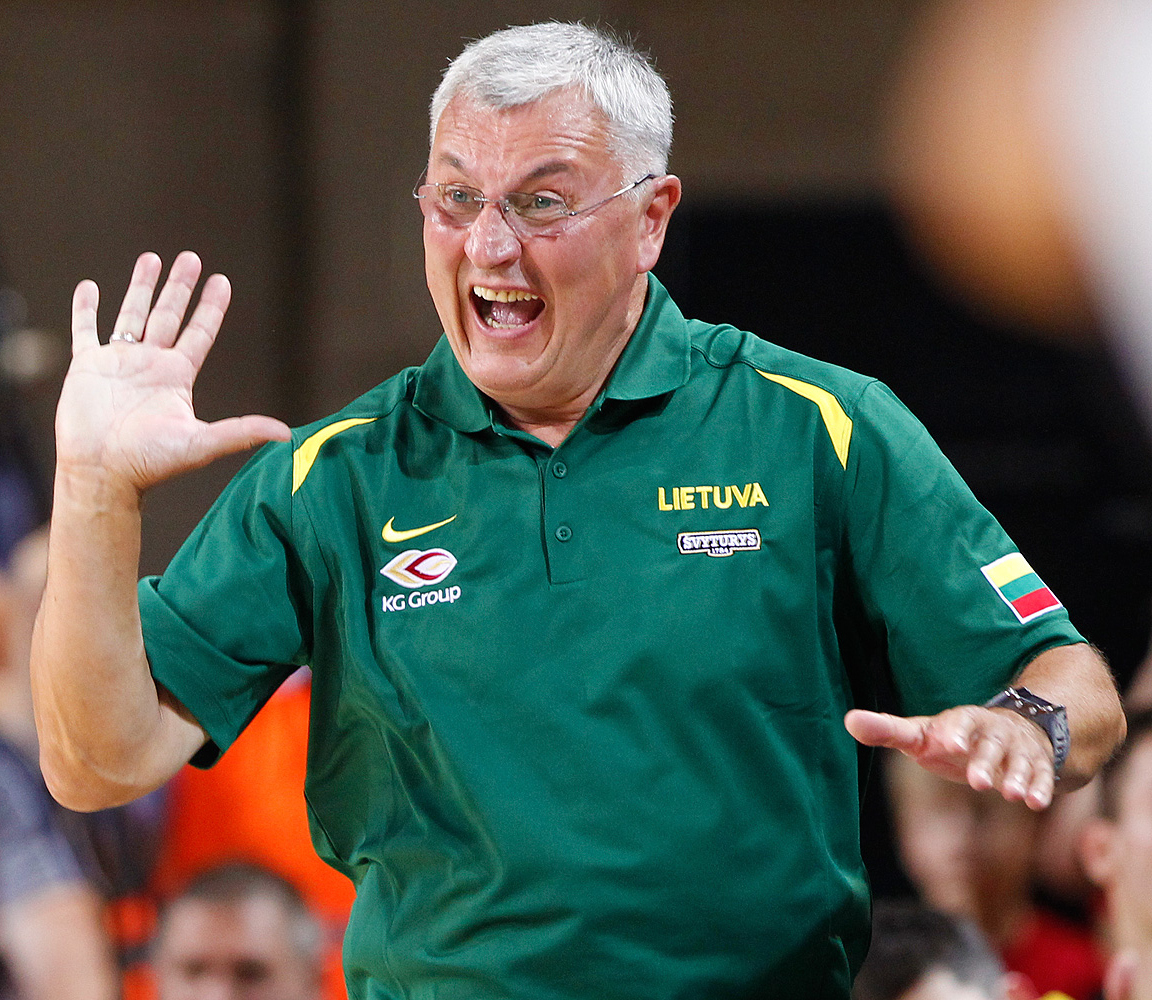
Jonas Kazlauskas won a record 6 LKL Finals

List of winning head coaches:

- 1994 – Jaak Salumets
- 1995 – Jonas Kazlauskas
- 1996 – Jonas Kazlauskas (2)
- 1997 – Jonas Kazlauskas (3)
- 1998 – Jonas Kazlauskas (4)
- 1999 – Jonas Kazlauskas (5)
- 2000 – Šarūnas Sakalauskas
- 2001 – Algirdas Brazys
- 2002 – Jonas Kazlauskas (6)
- 2003 – Antanas Sireika
- 2004 – Antanas Sireika (2)
- 2005 – Antanas Sireika (3)
- 2006 – Neven Spahija
- 2007 – Rimantas Grigas
- 2008 – Rimantas Grigas (2)
- 2009 – Rimas Kurtinaitis
- 2010 – Rimas Kurtinaitis (2)
- 2011 – Ilias Zouros
- 2012 – Aleksandar Trifunović
- 2013 – Joan Plaza
- 2014 – Gintaras Krapikas
- 2015 – Gintaras Krapikas (2)
- 2016 – Šarūnas Jasikevičius
- 2017 – Šarūnas Jasikevičius (2)
- 2018 – Šarūnas Jasikevičius (3)
- 2019 – Šarūnas Jasikevičius (4)
- 2020 – Finals were not held
- 2021 – Martin Schiller
- 2022 – Giedrius Žibėnas
- 2023 – Kazys Maksvytis
- 2024 – Giedrius Žibėnas (2)
- 2025 – Andrea Trinchieri
- 2026 – Tomas Masiulis

== LKL Finals Most Valuable Player ==
The LKL Finals Most Valuable Player Award is the annual award that is given by the professional Lithuanian Basketball League (LKL), to the Most Valuable Player of each season's LKL Finals.

Gintaras Einikis was the winner of the first Finals MVP award, in 1994. So far 5 players, Einikis, Arvydas Macijauskas, Tanoka Beard, Paulius Jankūnas and Edgaras Ulanovas, have won multiple Finals MVP awards. To date, Beard is the only non-Lithuanian player to win multiple Finals MVP awards. The current holder of the award is Ąžuolas Tubelis.

=== LKL Finals MVPs ===
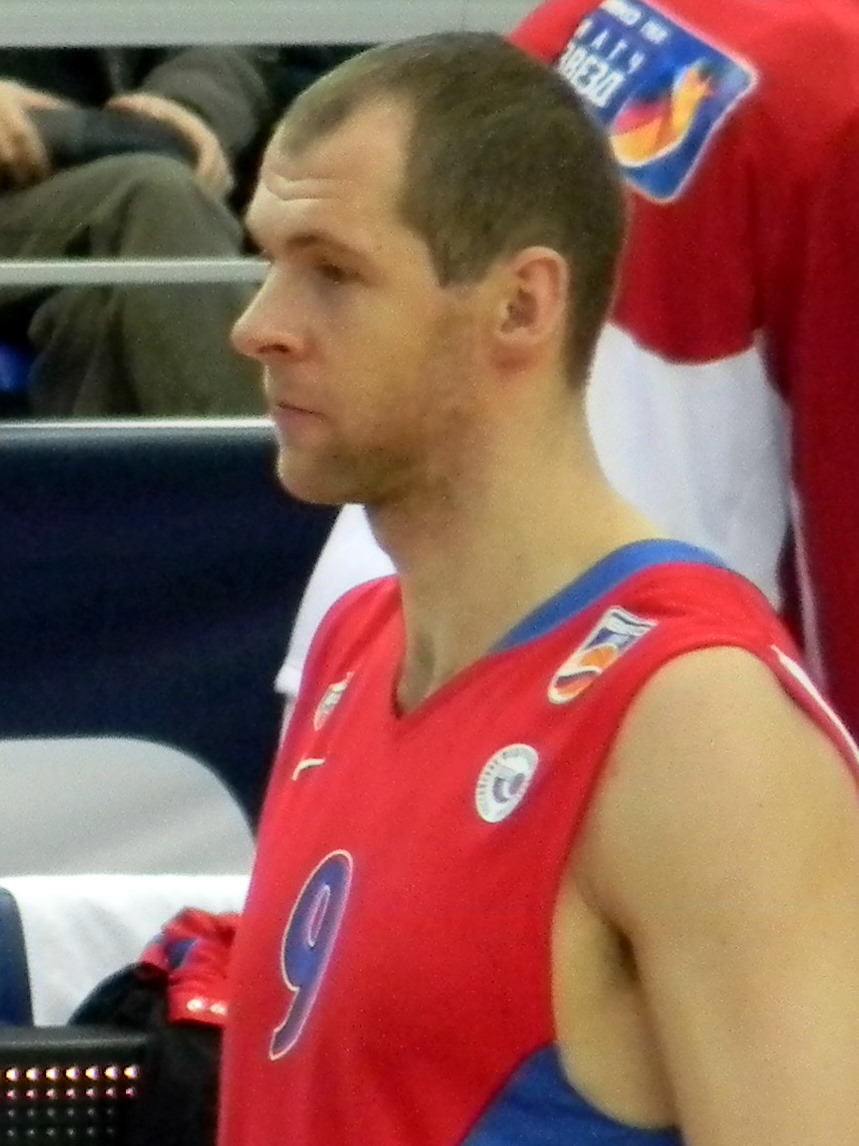
Ramūnas Šiškauskas was the LKL Finals MVP in 2001.

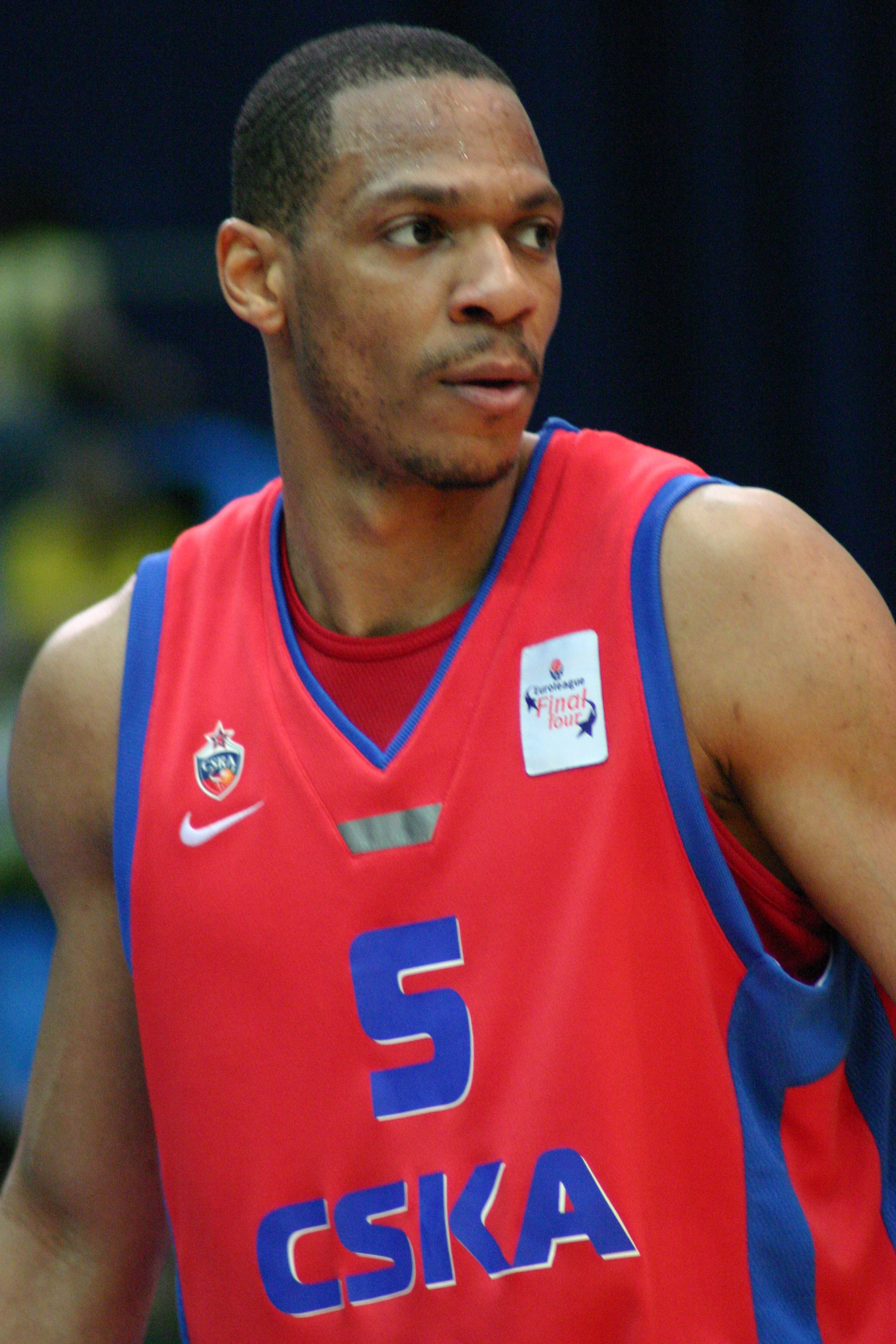
Marcus Brown was the LKL Finals MVP in 2008.

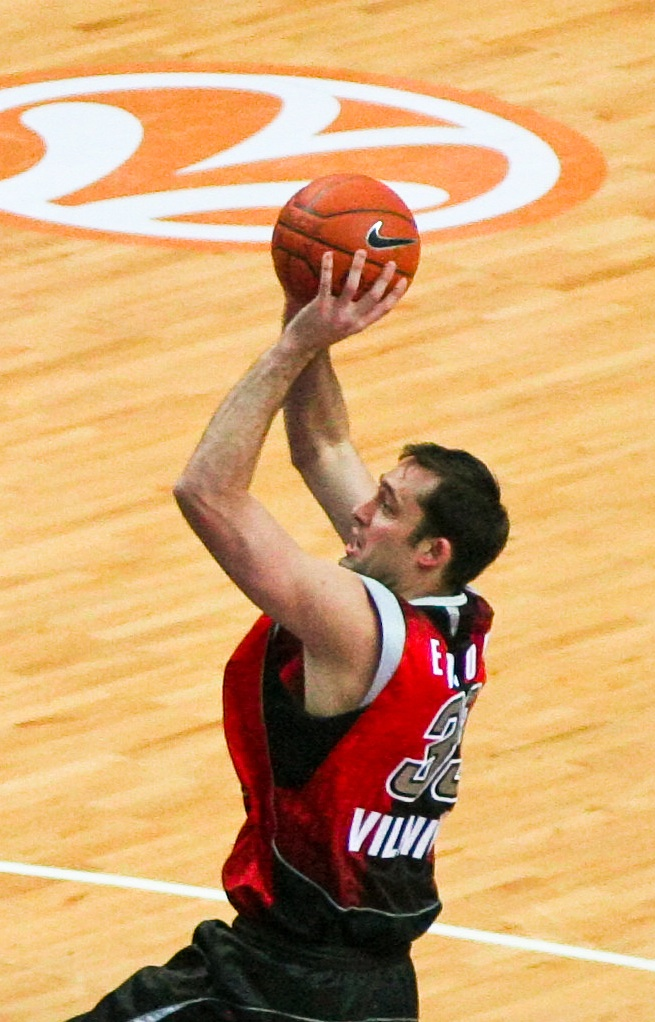
Chuck Eidson was the LKL Finals MVP in 2009.

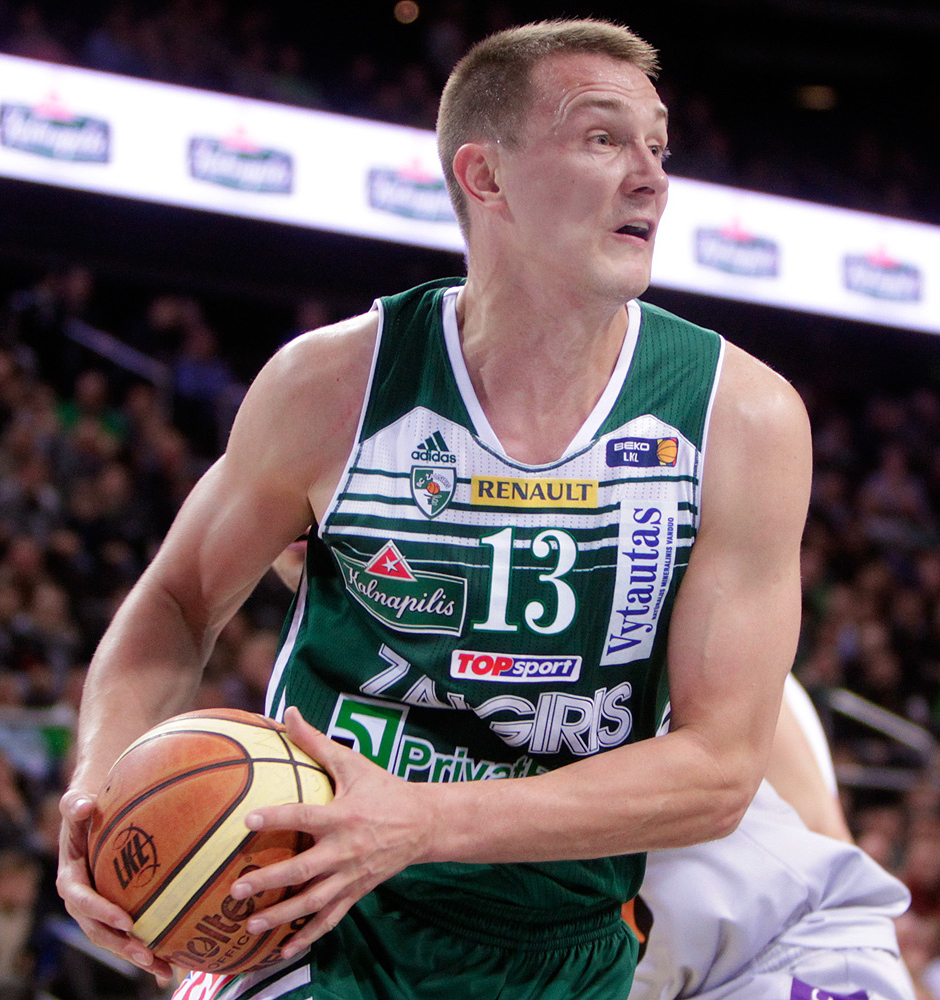
Paulius Jankūnas was the LKL Finals MVP in 2011 and 2014.

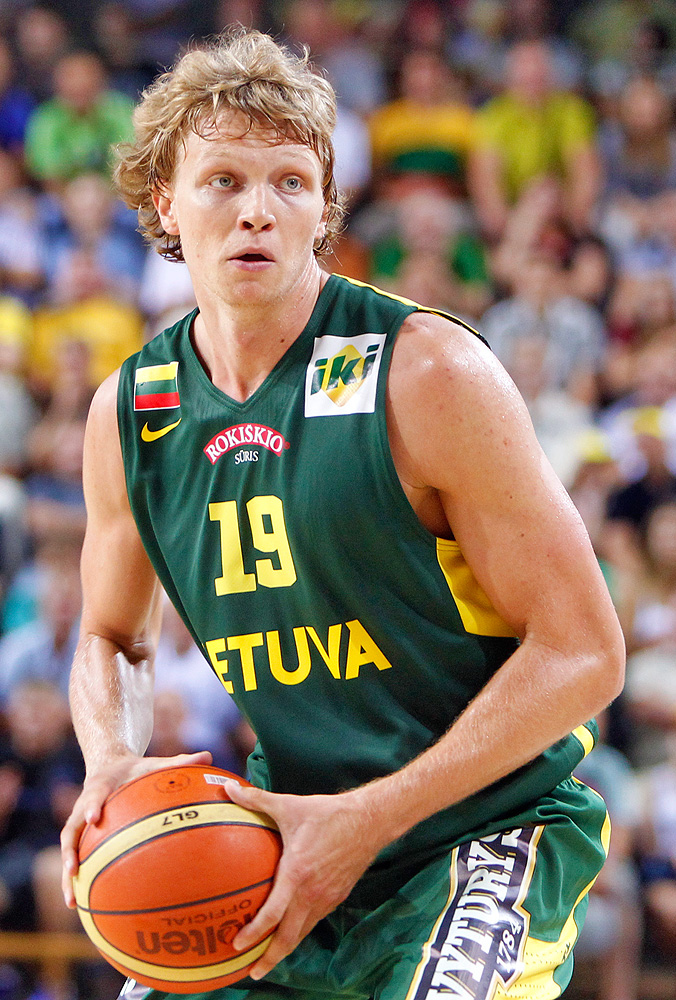
Mindaugas Kuzminskas was the LKL Finals MVP in 2013.

- Player nationality by national team:

*	Member of the Naismith Memorial Basketball Hall of Fame
**	Member of the FIBA Hall of Fame
***	Member of both the Naismith and FIBA Halls of Fame
†	Denotes player whose team won championship that year
Player (X)	Denotes the number of times the player has received the Finals MVP award

Season	Finals MVP	Position	Nationality	Club	Ref.
1993–94 †	Gintaras Einikis	PF/C	Lithuania	Žalgiris Kaunas	
1994–95 †	Gintaras Einikis (2×)	PF/C	Lithuania	Žalgiris Kaunas	
1995–96 †	Rimas Kurtinaitis	SG	Lithuania	Žalgiris Kaunas	
1996–97	N/A				
1997–98	N/A				
1998–99	N/A				
1999–00	Eurelijus Žukauskas	C	Lithuania	Žalgiris Kaunas	
2000–01	Ramūnas Šiškauskas	SG/SF	Lithuania	Lietuvos Rytas Vilnius	
2001–02 †	Arvydas Macijauskas	SG	Lithuania	Lietuvos Rytas Vilnius	
2002–03	Arvydas Macijauskas (2×)	SG	Lithuania	Lietuvos Rytas Vilnius	
2003–04 †	Tanoka Beard	PF/C	United States	Žalgiris Kaunas	
2004–05 †	Mindaugas Timinskas	SF/PF	Lithuania	Žalgiris Kaunas	
2005–06 †	Andrius Šležas	SF/PF	Lithuania	Lietuvos Rytas Vilnius	
2006–07 †	Tanoka Beard (2×)	PF/C	United States	Žalgiris Kaunas	
2007–08 †	Marcus Brown	SG	United States	Žalgiris Kaunas	
2008–09 †	Chuck Eidson	SG/SF	United States	Lietuvos Rytas Vilnius	
2009–10 †	Martynas Gecevičius	SG	Lithuania	Lietuvos Rytas Vilnius	
2010–11 †	Paulius Jankūnas	PF/C	Lithuania	Žalgiris Kaunas	
2011–12 †	Tomas Delininkaitis	SG	Lithuania	Žalgiris Kaunas	
2012–13 †	Mindaugas Kuzminskas	SF	Lithuania	Žalgiris Kaunas	
2013–14 †	Paulius Jankūnas (2×)	PF/C	Lithuania	Žalgiris Kaunas	
2014–15 †	Artūras Milaknis	SG/SF	Lithuania	Žalgiris Kaunas	
2015–16 †	Jerome Randle	PG	Ukraine	Žalgiris Kaunas	
2016–17 †	Edgaras Ulanovas	SF	Lithuania	Žalgiris Kaunas	
2017–18 †	Brandon Davies	PF	United States	Žalgiris Kaunas	
2018–19 †	Edgaras Ulanovas (2×)	SF	Lithuania	Žalgiris Kaunas	
2019–20	Finals not held				
2020–21 †	Thomas Walkup	PG	United States	Žalgiris Kaunas	
2021–22 †	Arnas Butkevičius	SF/PF	Lithuania	Rytas Vilnius	
2022–23 †	Isaiah Taylor	PG	United States	Žalgiris Kaunas	
2023–24 †	Marcus Foster	SG	United States	Rytas Vilnius	
2024–25 †	Sylvain Francisco	PG	France	Žalgiris Kaunas	
2025–26 †	Ąžuolas Tubelis	PF / C	Lithuania	Žalgiris Kaunas	

==== Multi-time winners ====
Player	Team(s)	No.	Years
(Lithuania) Gintaras Einikis	Žalgiris Kaunas	2	1994, 1995
(Lithuania) Arvydas Macijauskas	Lietuvos Rytas Vilnius	2	2002, 2003
(United States) Tanoka Beard	Žalgiris Kaunas	2	2004, 2007
(Lithuania) Paulius Jankūnas	Žalgiris Kaunas	2	2011, 2014
(Lithuania) Edgaras Ulanovas	Žalgiris Kaunas	2	2017, 2019

==== By player nationality ====
Number	Country
19×	Lithuania
8×	United States
1×	Ukraine
1×	France

==== By club ====
Number	Team
21×	Žalgiris Kaunas
8×	Lietuvos Rytas Vilnius / Rytas Vilnius

== See also ==
- LKL
- LKL MVP
- LKL Finals
- LKL Finals MVP
- King Mindaugas Cup
- King Mindaugas Cup MVP
- LKF Cup
- List of Lithuanian basketball league champions
- Basketball in Lithuania
