= Lithuanian Basketball League awards =

The Lithuanian Basketball League awards are the 6 annual awards, that are given by the professional Lithuanian Basketball League (LKL), to recognize its teams and players, for their accomplishments.

== Team trophies ==
Award	Description	Most recent winner
LKL Championship	Awarded to the winner of the LKL Finals.	Žalgiris
Lithuanian Cup	Awarded to the winner of the Lithuanian Cup Finals.	Žalgiris

== Individual awards ==
Award	Description	Most recent winner(s)
King Mindaugas Cup MVP	Awarded to the best performing player of the annual King Mindaugas Cup	(Lithuania) Ignas Brazdeikis (Žalgiris)
LKL Most Valuable Player	Awarded to the best performing player of the regular LKL season, as voted by a panel of sportswriters throughout Lithuania.	(United States) Anthony Cowan Jr. (Wolves)
LKL Finals Most Valuable Player	Awarded to the best performing player of the LKL Finals, as voted by a panel of nine media members.	(France) Sylvain Francisco (Žalgiris)

== LKL Coach of the Year ==
The LKL Coach of the Year award is given to the best head coach of the full LKL season.

== LKL MVP of the Month ==
The LKL MVP of the Month is the basketball award given to the best Lithuanian Basketball League (LKL) player for each month of the season.

== See also ==
- Basketball in Lithuania
