= 2008 LKL Finals =

2008 LKL finals
Team	Coach	Wins
Žalgiris	Rimantas Grigas	4
Lietuvos Rytas	Aleksandar Trifunović	1
- Dates: May 5- May 17
- MVP: Marcus Brown

The 2008 LKL Finals was the championship series of the Lithuanian Basketball League's 2007–08 LKL season, and the conclusion of the season's playoffs. Žalgiris defeated Lietuvos Rytas in a five games, series 4–1. It was the club's 12th Lithuanian League title. Žalgiris had won the most Lithuanian championships of all-time at that point. Lietuvos Rytas had three Lithuanian championships at that time. The games were broadcast on LTV with Linas Kunigėlis as the announcer.

== Way to Finals ==
On the way to the finals, Žalgiris won against Sakalai (110–73, 90–80), in the quarterfinals, and Šiauliai (100–76, 94–83), in the semifinals. Šiauliai later won third place.
Lietuvos Rytas defeated Aisčiai-Atletas (126–59, 87–67), in the first round of the playoffs, and later Alytus (116–62, 115–85).

== Game summaries ==
=== Game 1 ===
May 5

Recap

BC Lietuvos Rytas 76, Žalgiris 73
Scoring by quarter: 23–17, 14–16, 19–15, 20–25
Pts: Lukauskis 22; Rebs: Petravičius 12; Asts: Price 1, Petravičius 1, Jomantas 1	Pts: Jankūnas 17; Rebs: Jankūnas 9 Asts: Collins 5

Siemens Arena
Attendance: 5,200
Referees:
- V. Dovidavičius
- T. Jasevičius
- A. Ramanauskas

=== Game 2 ===
May 8

Recap

Žalgiris 87, BC Lietuvos Rytas 80
Scoring by quarter: 27–18, 21–24, 27–22, 12–16
Pts: Collins 18; Rebs: Markota 7 Asts: Collins 7	Pts: Bajramović 18; Rebs: Nielsen 8 Asts: Price 2, Eidson 2, Petravičius 2

Kaunas Sports Hall
Attendance: 5,000
Referees:
- R. Brazauskas
- K. Pilipauskas
- M. Večerskis

=== Game 3 ===
May 12

Recap

BC Lietuvos Rytas 90, Žalgiris 91
Scoring by quarter: 22–23, 21–24, 14–16, 24–18
Pts: Bajramović 24; Rebs: Eidson 7 Asts: Price 3, Eidson 3, Jordan 3	Pts: Brown 27; Rebs: Markota 10; Asts: Brown 7

Siemens Arena
Attendance: 9,800
Referees:
- R. Brazauskas
- T. Jasevicius
- A. Ramanauskas

=== Game 4 ===
May 14

Recap

Žalgiris 92, BC Lietuvos Rytas 79
Scoring by quarter: 27–23, 29–23, 16–15, 20–18
Pts: Markota 20; Rebs: Žukauskas 7 Asts: Collins 7	Pts: Bajramović 19; Rebs: Price 8 Asts: Eidson 3

Kaunas Sports Hall
Attendance: 5,000
Referees:
- K. Pilipauskas
- V. Dovidavičius
- M. Večerskis

=== Game 5 ===
May 17

Recap

BC Lietuvos Rytas 75, Žalgiris 81 (OT)
Scoring by quarter: 25–20, 17–14, 9–14, 18–21, Overtime: 6-12
Pts: Lukauskis 19; Rebs: Jomantas 8 Asts: Eidson 3	Pts: Collins 15; Rebs: Markota 12; Asts: Collins 5

Siemens Arena
Attendance: 9,300
Referees:
- R. Brazauskas
- V. Dovidavičius
- T. Jasevičius
