= Arvydas Macijauskas =

Lithuanian basketball player (born 1980)

Personal information
- Born: 19 January 1980 (age 46) Klaipėda, Lithuania
- Listed height: 6 ft 4 in (1.93 m)
- Listed weight: 215 lb (98 kg)

Career information
- NBA draft: 2002: undrafted
- Playing career: 1996–2008
- Position: Shooting guard
- Number: 6, 7

Career history
- 1996–1997: Universitetas-Irvinga Klaipėda
- 1997–1999: Neptūnas Klaipėda
- 1999–2003: Lietuvos rytas Vilnius
- 2003–2005: Tau Ceramica
- 2005–2006: New Orleans/Oklahoma City Hornets
- 2006–2008: Olympiacos

Career highlights
- All-EuroLeague First Team (2005); Lithuanian Player of the Year (2004); LKL MVP (2003); 2× LKL Finals MVP (2002, 2003); 2× LKL champion (2000, 2002); Spanish Cup winner (2005); NEBL Finals MVP (2002); NEBL champion (2002); LKL All-Star Game MVP (2003); 3× LKL All-Star (2001–2003); 3× LKL Three-point Shootout champion (2000, 2002, 2003); No. 7 retired by Rytas Vilnius
- Stats at NBA.com
- Stats at Basketball Reference
Medals
Men's basketball
Representing Lithuania
EuroBasket
Gold medal – first place	2003 Sweden

Arvydas Macijauskas (born 19 January 1980) is a Lithuanian former professional basketball player. Standing at 1.93 m (6 ft 4 in) tall, he played at the shooting guard position. Widely considered one of the greatest Lithuanian players of the 2000s, he won numerous individual awards, as well as club and national team titles.

After starting his professional career with Neptūnas, he later played for some top EuroLeague teams, such as Tau Ceramica and Olympiacos. He also played with the New Orleans/Oklahoma City Hornets for one season in the NBA. He also represented the senior Lithuanian national basketball team.

He announced his retirement from playing professional basketball in 2010, two years after his last club, Olympiacos, had released him following a prolonged judicial litigation.

== Early career ==
Early in his career, Macijauskas was a member of the Neptūnas junior team.

== Professional playing career ==
=== Lithuania ===
Macijauskas made his pro debut in 1997, during the 1996–97 season, with the Lithuanian League club Neptūnas. He only played in 3 games in his rookie season, and spent most of the season with the Klaipėda University-Irvinga team. He spent three seasons with Neptūnas, and averaged 12.7 points per game, on 53 percent field goal shooting, in the Lithuanian League.

He played the next four seasons with the Lithuanian club Lietuvos rytas, and he led them to two Lithuanian League titles, in 2000 and 2002, and to a Northern European League title in 2003. He was named the Lithuanian League Finals MVP in 2002 and 2003. He averaged 15.3 points per game, on 61 percent field goal shooting, in 143 games played with Rytas.

On 11 November 2023, Rytas Vilnius retired Macijauskas' jersey No. 7.

=== Spain ===
Macijauskas joined the Spanish League club Tau Ceramica, for the next two seasons and he helped them win a Spanish Cup title in 2004. On 17 December 2003 he scored a career-high 40 points, in a EuroLeague 2003–04 season game against the French League club ASVEL Lyon. With Tau Ceramica, he also reached the EuroLeague's Final in 2005, where his team lost to the Israeli Super League club Maccabi Tel Aviv; which was also led by a Lithuanian player, and EuroLeague Final Four MVP, Šarūnas Jasikevičius. Macijauskas was selected to the All-EuroLeague First Team of the 2004–05 season. In two seasons with Tau, he played in 42 EuroLeague games, in which he averaged 18.6 points, 2.4 rebounds, and 2.5 assists per game.

=== NBA ===
Macijauskas signed with the New Orleans/Oklahoma City Hornets in 2005. He was rarely used in his only season in the NBA, as he totaled 135 minutes of playing time, and 44 points scored, in 19 games played. He was bought out by the Hornets after the season ended. After returning to Europe, he criticized the Hornets and the NBA through the press. When asked if he had put the previous season behind him, Macijauskas responded: "I want to forget that year. Everything went wrong. A really bad coach, a bad franchise. At the end of the season, I didn't even think of returning to New Orleans next season. From the third game on, I was already sentenced to zero minutes for the rest of the year. The NBA is not a fun experience. Teams are (not) teams. There's no true commitment between the teammates."

=== Greece ===
On 20 July 2006 Macijauskas signed with the Greek League club Olympiacos. The deal was worth €9 million euros net income over four years. However, he suffered a devastating Achilles' tendon injury in September 2006, and he only played in two games during the EuroLeague 2006–07 season.

Macijauskas was healthy for the following EuroLeague 2007–08 season, and he was named the EuroLeague MVP of the Month for November 2007, after shooting a staggering 72.5 percent overall from the field (84.6 percent on 2 point field goal attempts, and 50 percent on 3 point field goal attempts). Olympiacos lost to the eventual EuroLeague champions CSKA Moscow, in the league's quarterfinals. Ironically, one of that team's leaders was also a Lithuanian player, Ramūnas Šiškauskas.

Later that year, Olympiacos sued Macijauskas for violating his contract terms (he injured his ankle during a holiday). The club wanted to cancel his contract, without paying him anymore compensation. A court later made a decision in Macijauskas' favor. However, Olympiacos appealed it, and eventually won the case in November 2009. In two seasons with Olympiacos, he played in 14 EuroLeague games, in which he averaged 13.8 points and 2.1 rebounds per game.

In June 2010, he announced his retirement from his basketball playing career, because of health reasons.

== National team career ==
Macijauskas was a member of the Lithuanian Under-18 and Under-20 junior national teams. He played at the 1998 FIBA Europe Under-18 Championship and at the 2000 FIBA Europe Under-20 Championship.

Macijauskas led the senior Lithuania national team in scoring, at the EuroBasket 2003, with an average of 15.8 points per game. The Lithuanians prevailed to win the gold medals at the tournament. However, his teammate, Šarūnas Jasikevičius, was named the tournament's MVP.

He also played at the 2004 Summer Olympic Games, where the Lithuanians finished in fourth place. He averaged 15.9 points per game, on 54 percent field goal shooting, and scored a tournament-high 32 points against China, in the quarterfinals.

Macijauskas also played at the 2006 World Championship, where the Lithuanian team finished in seventh place. He was a candidate for the Lithuanian team for EuroBasket 2009 in Poland, but at the last minute, he declared that he would not participate in the tournament.

== Coaching career ==
On 19 June 2010 Macijauskas became the assistant coach of the Lithuanian club Perlas Vilnius, but in August it was announced that he had left Perlas, for personal reasons.

== Personal life ==
Arvydas Macijauskas married Viktorija Buder on 24 July 2010.

== State awards ==
- Lithuania: Recipient of the Grand Cross of the Order for Merits to Lithuania (2003)

== Career statistics ==
Legend
GP	Games played	GS	Games started	MPG	Minutes per game
FG%	Field-goal percentage	3P%	3-point field-goal percentage	FT%	Free-throw percentage
RPG	Rebounds per game	APG	Assists per game	SPG	Steals per game
BPG	Blocks per game	PPG	Points per game	PIR	Performance index rating
**Bold**	Career high

=== EuroLeague ===
Year	Team	GP	GS	MPG	FG%	3P%	FT%	RPG	APG	SPG	BPG	PPG	PIR
2003–04	Tau Cerámica	20	16	30.5	.492	.396	.910	**2.5**	2.1	1.6	**.2**	**19.4**	**20.4**
2004–05	Tau Cerámica	**22**	**19**	**30.7**	.479	**.402**	.915	2.3	**2.8**	1.5	.1	17.9	18.3
2006–07	Olympiacos	2	0	15.0	.455	.143	**1.000**	**2.5**	1.0	1.0	.0	7.5	5.0
2007–08	Olympiacos	12	9	23.2	**.586**	.379	.867	2.0	1.7	**1.7**	**.2**	14.8	17.9
Career		56	44	28.5	.500	.390	.903	2.3	2.2	1.6	.1	17.4	18.5

=== NBA ===
==== Regular season ====
Year	Team	GP	GS	MPG	FG%	3P%	FT%	RPG	APG	SPG	BPG	PPG
2005–06	New Orleans/Oklahoma City	19	0	7.1	.341	.250	.867	.5	.3	.4	.0	2.3
Career		19	0	7.1	.341	.250	.867	.5	.3	.4	.0	2.3
