= Tomas Urbonas =

Lithuanian basketball player (born 1992)

Personal information
- Born: 7 March 1992 (age 34) Molėtai, Lithuania
- Listed height: 217 cm (7.12 ft)
- Listed weight: 110 kg (240 lb)

Career information
- NBA draft: 2014: undrafted
- Playing career: 2009–present
- Position: Center

Career history
- 2009–2010: Aisčiai Kaunas (LKL)
- 2010–2012: LKKA-Atletas Kaunas (NKL)
- 2012–2014: LSU-Baltai / LSU-Atletas Kaunas (LKL)
- 2014: Prienai (LKL)
- 2014–2015: Zanavykas Šakiai (NKL)
- 2015–2017: Dzūkija Alytus (LKL)
- 2016–2017: USR BASKET (LNB)
- 2017–2018: Šilutė (NKL)

Career highlights
- 2× Lithuanian League blocks leader (2013, 2014)
Medals
Men's basketball
Representing Lithuania
FIBA Europe Under-16 Championship
| Gold medal – first place | 2008 Italy | Team competition |

Tomas Urbonas (born 7 March 1992 in Molėtai, Lithuania) is a Lithuanian professional basketball player who plays as a center.

== International career ==
He won European youth gold medal while representing the Lithuanian U-16 National Team at the 2008 FIBA Europe Under-16 Championship.

== Professional career ==
On August 29, 2015, Urbonas signed a long-term contract with the Dzūkija Alytus of LKL.
