= 2009 LKL Finals =

Lithuanian Basketball League championship series

2009 LKL finals
Team	Coach	Wins
Lietuvos Rytas	Rimas Kurtinaitis	4
Žalgiris	Gintaras Krapikas	1
- Dates: May 6- May 18
- MVP: Chuck Eidson

The 2009 LKL Finals was the championship series of the Lithuanian Basketball League's 2008–09 LKL season, and the conclusion of the season's playoffs. Lietuvos Rytas won the series against Žalgiris, 4–1. The games were broadcast on LTV with Linas Kunigėlis as the announcer.

Game	Referees		
1	K. Pilipauskas	T. Jasevičius	A. Ramanauskas
2	R. Brazauskas	V. Dovidavičius	M. Večerskis
3	R. Brazauskas	V. Dovidavičius	J. Laurinavičius
4	K. Pilipauskas	T. Jasevičius	A. Ramanauskas
5	R. Brazauskas	K. Pilipauskas	V. Dovidavičius
