= LKL champions =

The LKL champions are awarded a trophy each season following the conclusion of the LKL Finals, presented to the team that wins the Lithuanian Basketball League title

== Winners ==
The winning team of the LKL Finals receives the LKL Championship Trophy. Žalgiris were the first winner of the trophy, in 1994, after defeating Atletas, three games to zero. Žalgiris has since won the trophy 19 times

== See also ==
- List of Lithuanian basketball league champions
- Basketball in Lithuania
