= Gintaras Krapikas =

Lithuanian basketball coach and former player

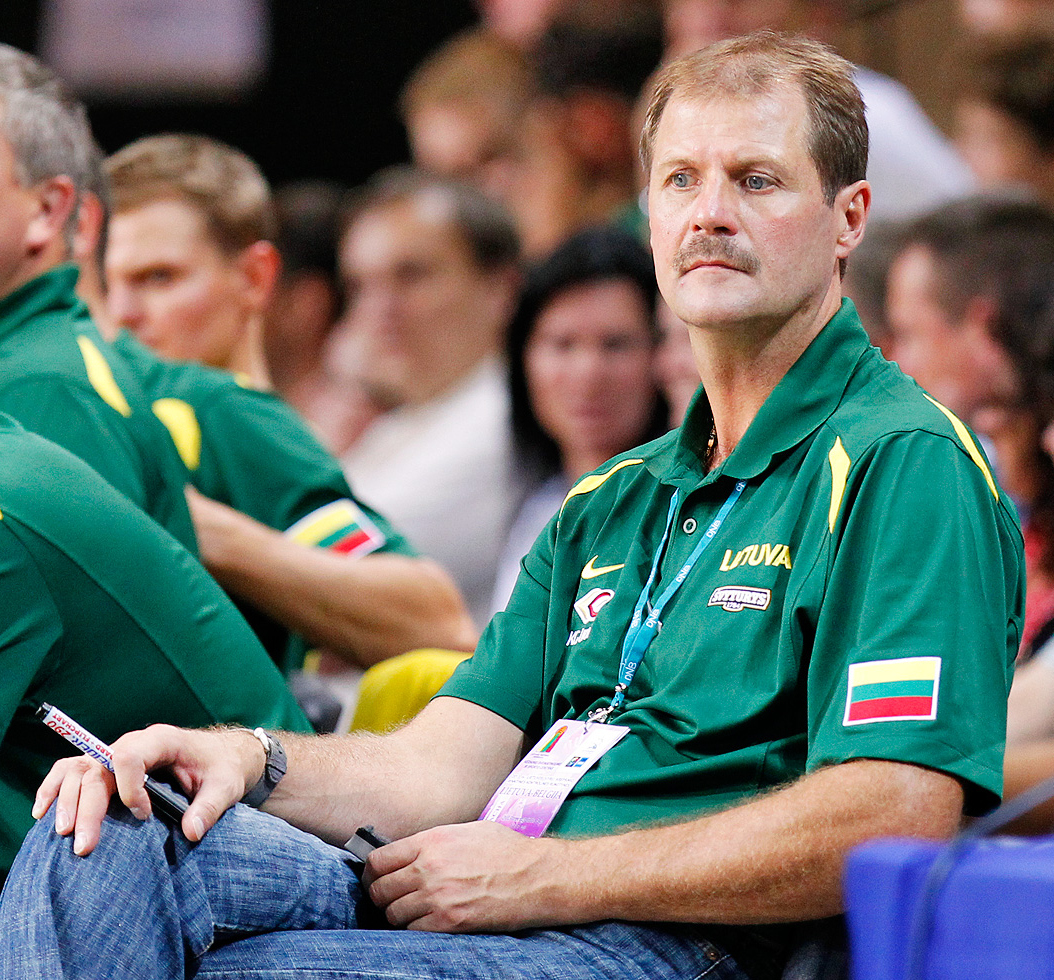
- Krapikas with Lithuania in 2013

Personal information
- Born: 6 July 1961 (age 65) Kretinga, Lithuanian SSR, Soviet Union
- Listed height: 6 ft 5 in (1.96 m)

Career information
- Playing career: 1980–1999
- Position: Shooting guard / small forward
- Coaching career: 2000–present

Career history

Playing
- 1980–1990: Žalgiris Kaunas
- 1990–1999: Tus Iserlohn

Coaching
- 2000–2006: Žalgiris Kaunas (assistant)
- 2006–2008: Unics Kazan (assistant)
- 2008: Žalgiris Kaunas (assistant)
- 2008–2009: Žalgiris Kaunas
- 2010–2011: Nevėžis Kėdainiai
- 2011–2012: Azovmash Mariupol
- 2012: Unics Kazan (assistant)
- 2013–2014: Žalgiris Kaunas (assistant)
- 2014–2016: Žalgiris Kaunas
- 2018–2019: Nanjing Monkey Kings
- 2019–2020: Nanjing Monkey Kings (assistant)
- 2020–2021: Guangdong Southern Tigers (assistant)
- 2022–2025: Žalgiris Kaunas (assistant)

Career highlights
- As player: Soviet Union champion (1987); As assistant coach: 5× Lithuanian League champion (2001, 2003–2005, 2023, 2025); King Mindaugas Cup winner (2023, 2024, 2025); CBA champion (2021); Baltic League champion (2005); As head coach: 2× Lithuanian League champion (2014, 2015); Lithuanian Cup winner (2015)
Medals
Men's basketball
Representing Lithuania
Olympic Games
Bronze medal – third place	1992 Barcelona	National team
EuroBasket
Silver medal – second place	1995 Greece	National team
Silver medal – second place	2013 Slovenia	National team
Silver medal – second place	2015 France	National team

Gintaras Krapikas (born 6 July 1961) is a Lithuanian professional basketball coach and former player. He was a member of the Lithuania national team that won a bronze medal in the 1992 Summer Olympics. He recently served as an assistant coach of Žalgiris Kaunas.

== Playing career ==
During the 1980s, while playing for Žalgiris, Krapikas' jersey number was 9, and his position was small forward.

== Coaching career ==
In 2000, Krapikas took a position as assistant basketball coach for Žalgiris Kaunas; together with the head coach, Antanas Sireika, he stepped down from this position in 2006, when the coaching team was re-organized. From 2002 to 2005, he was an assistant coach for the Lithuanian national team. From 2006 until 2008, he was an assistant basketball coach for UNICS Kazan.

In 2008, he was the head coach of Žalgiris Kaunas, to very little success, and on December 18, 2009, he resigned from Žalgiris Kaunas' head coach post. He also coached Nevėžis for a short time in the 2010-2011 season, and was the assistant and head coach for Azovmash in 2011-2012. He returned to UNICS Kazan in 2012. Before the 2013-2014 season, he came back to Žalgiris Kaunas as an assistant coach. He became head coach in April. This time, he was much more success - under Krapikas, Žalgiris played great defence - and had a solid season in the Euroleague in 2014-2015, making the Top16 phase. Žalgiris also won the LKF Cup in 2015, as well as the 2014 and 2015 LKL titles. The team dominated in matches with biggest rival BC Lietuvos rytas. By the 2015-2016 season, however, the magic had worn off - the results were poor, especially in the Euroleague, and Krapikas resigned under much pressure in January, 2016. He was replaced by Šarūnas Jasikevičius.

In 2018, Krapikas signed with the Nanjing Monkey Kings of the Chinese Basketball Association (CBA). For the 2019–20 season, he became an assistant coach for the team. In 2020, he moved to Guangdong Southern Tigers, with whom he won a CBA title in the 2020–21 season. On 11 April 2022, Krapikas returned to Žalgiris Kaunas as an assistant coach under Kazys Maksvytis.

== Awards and achievements ==
- USSR League Champion - 1985, 1986, 1987
- Intercontinental W. Jones Cup winner - 1986
- Olympic Bronze medalist - 1992
- European championship Silver medalist - 1995

== Coaching record ==
Legend
G	Games coached	W	Games won	L	Games lost	W–L %	Win-loss %

Note: The EuroLeague is not the only competition in which the team played during the season. He also coached in domestic competition, and regional competition if applicable.

=== EuroLeague ===
Team	Year	G	W	L	W–L%	Result
Žalgiris	2008–09	10	2	8	.200	Eliminated in group stage
Žalgiris	2009–10	8	1	7	.125	Resigned
Žalgiris	2014–15	24	10	14	.417	Eliminated in TOP-16
Žalgiris	2015–16	12	5	7	.417	Fired
Career		54	18	36	.333	

== Filmography ==
Year	Title	Role	Notes	Ref
2023	Bilietas (The Ticket)	Himself	Documentary about the basketball club Žalgiris Kaunas in 1979–1989.	
2023	Ukraine on Fire 2	Himself	TV mini series about the Russian invasion of Ukraine. Appeared in one episode.	
2023	The Captain. Paulius Jankūnas story	Himself	Documentary about Paulius Jankūnas, a long-term captain of the Žalgiris Kaunas.	

== Nickname ==
Gintaras Krapikas has an old nickname, which appeared during his tenure with Kaunas Žalgiris as a player. The nickname appeared due to his second name "Krapikas", which is a little bit similar to Lithuanian word "Krapai" (English: Dill) and at that time, there was a famous dill farmer, Vytas, from Petrašiūnai.
