= Paulius Jankūnas =

Lithuanian basketball player (born 1984)

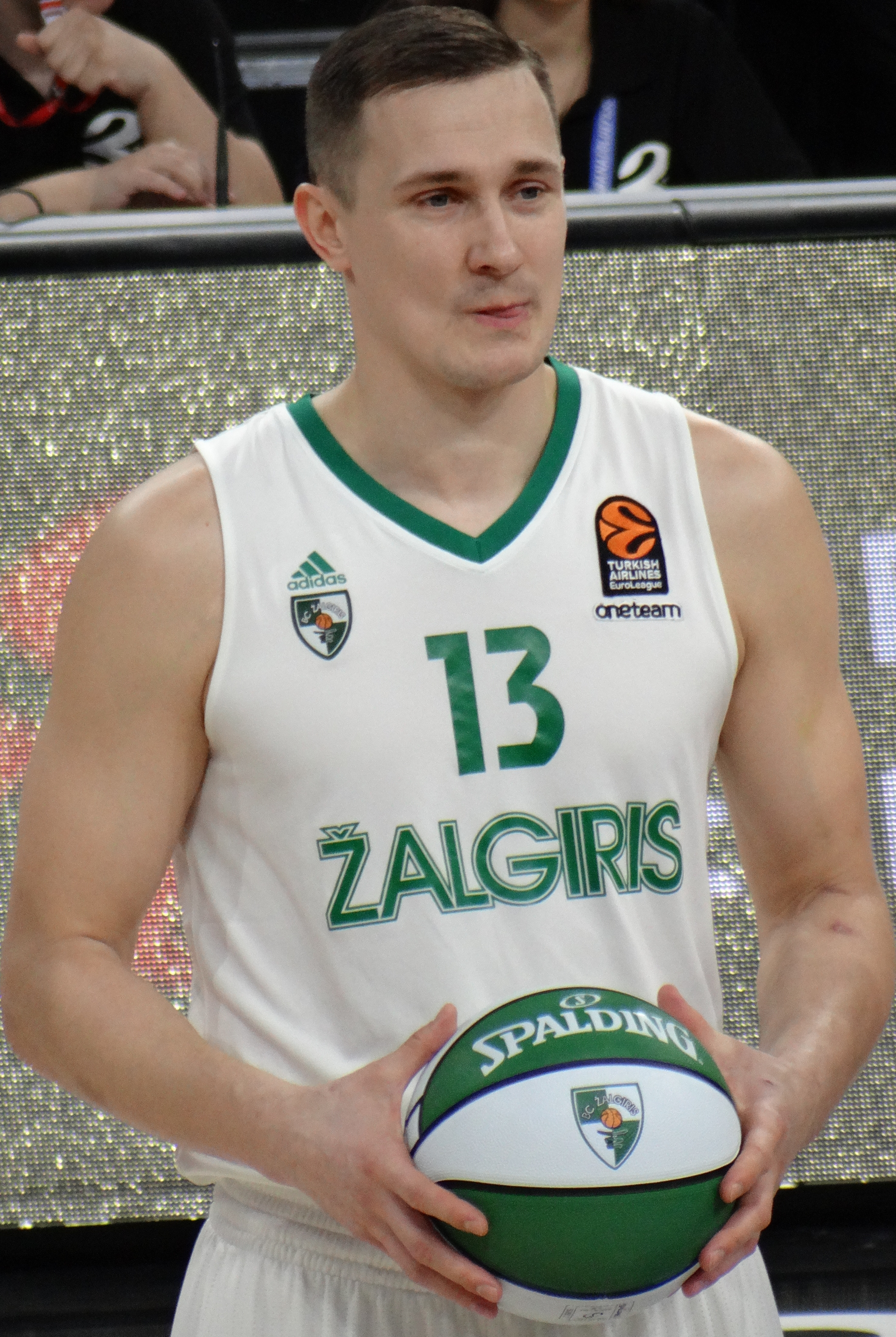
- Jankūnas with Žalgiris Kaunas in 2018

Žalgiris Kaunas
- Title: President

Personal information
- Born: 29 April 1984 (age 42) Kaunas, Lithuania
- Listed height: 205 cm (6 ft 9 in)
- Listed weight: 113 kg (249 lb)

Career information
- NBA draft: 2006: undrafted
- Playing career: 2002–2022
- Position: Power forward / center
- Number: 13

Career history
- 2002–2003: LKKA-Žalgiris Kaunas
- 2003–2009: Žalgiris Kaunas
- 2009–2010: BC Khimki
- 2010–2022: Žalgiris Kaunas

Career highlights
- Gianluigi Porelli EuroLeague EOY (2026); All-EuroLeague Second Team (2018); All-VTB United League Second Team (2012); 15× Lithuanian LKL champion (2004, 2005, 2007, 2008, 2011–2021); 2× Lithuanian LKL Finals MVP (2011, 2014); 7× Lithuanian LKL All-Star (2008, 2009, 2011–2015); Lithuanian LKL rebounding leader (2014); 5× Lithuanian King Mindaugas Cup winner (2017, 2018, 2020, 2021, 2022); 5× Lithuanian LKF Cup winner (2006, 2007, 2011, 2012, 2015); Lithuanian LKF Cup MVP (2011); Lithuanian Super Cup winner (2012); 4× Baltic BBL champion (2005, 2008, 2011, 2012); Baltic BBL MVP (2009); Baltic BBL All-Star (2006); Lithuanian 2nd Division champion (2003); Lithuanian 2nd Division MVP (2003); No. 13 retired by Žalgiris Kaunas; LKL records: Lithuanian League all-time efficiency leader; Lithuanian League all-time +/- leader
Medals
Men's basketball
Representing Lithuania
FIBA World Cup
Bronze medal – third place	Turkey 2010
EuroBasket
Silver medal – second place	2015 France–Croatia–Germany–Latvia
Bronze medal – third place	2007 Spain
FIBA U-21 World Cup
Gold medal – first place	2005 Argentina	U-21 Team
FIBA U-20 European Championship
Bronze medal – third place	2004 Czech Republic	U-20 Team
FIBA U-19 World Cup
Silver medal – second place	2003 Greece	U-19 Team

When asked about playing with European basketball legend Arvydas Sabonis, in his rookie season, Jankūnas responded: "No doubt it was the most remarkable season. It was fantastic to play with Arvydas Sabonis. I was very young, and it was very exciting. In the beginning, I was a little bit afraid and uncomfortable, but later things got easy, and I learned a lot from him. When I was a kid, I used to watch him playing on TV, and never dared to dream that I would be playing with Arvydas Sabonis. One day I woke up, and Sabonis was my teammate. It was great. He had huge experience, and gave a lot of advice to me. It was a big honor to play with him, and I hope I learned something from Sabonis."

— Paulius Jankūnas

Paulius Jankūnas (born 29 April 1984) is a Lithuanian former professional basketball player who mainly played for Žalgiris Kaunas of the Lithuanian Basketball League (LKL) and the EuroLeague. He was also a member of the senior Lithuanian national team. Jankūnas played at either center or power forward, with power forward being his main position. He earned an All-EuroLeague Second Team selection in 2018.

== Early years ==
Jankūnas played two seasons with the LKKA-Žalgiris, leading the team to a LKAL (Lithuanian League 2nd Division) title in 2003. He was named the Lithuanian 2nd Division MVP after averaging 20.0 points, 12.3 rebounds and 1.5 blocks per game.

He competed at the Reebok Eurocamp in Treviso in 2003.

== Professional career ==
=== Žalgiris Kaunas ===
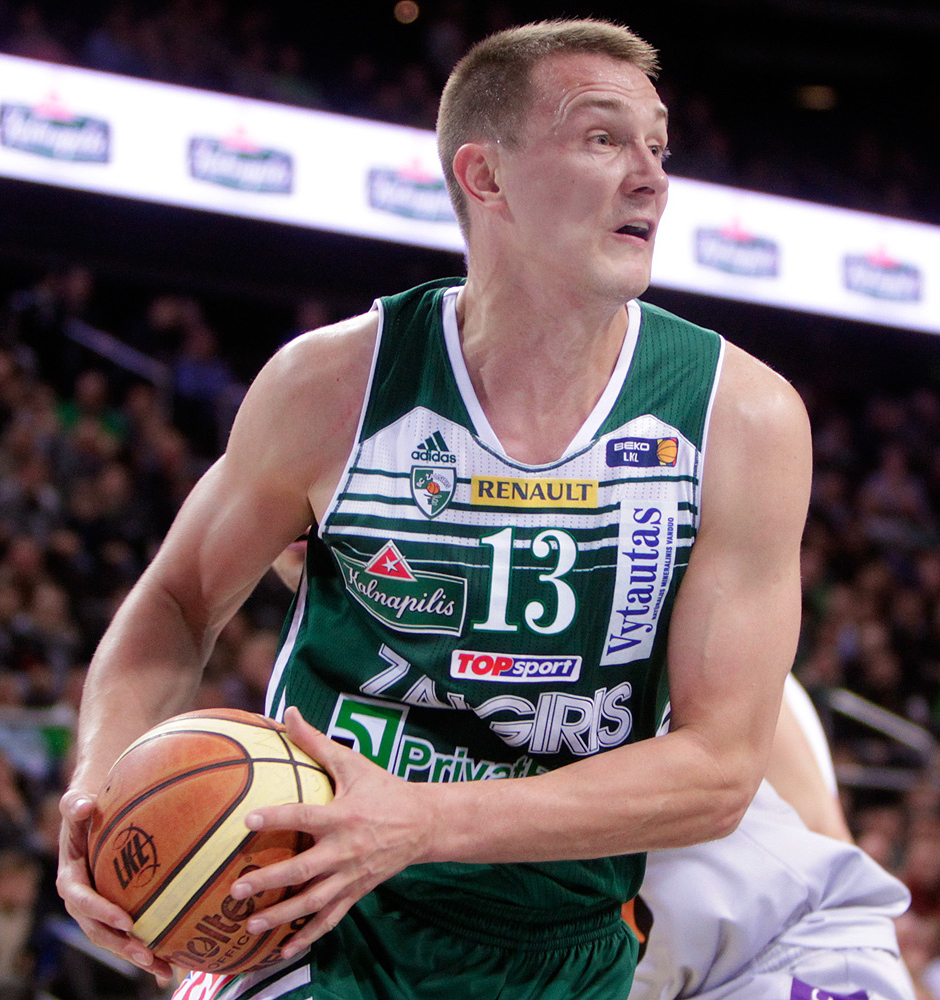
Jankūnas with Žalgiris Kaunas in 2014

After playing in the Lithuanian 2nd Division with LKKA-Žalgiris during the 2002–03 season, Jankūnas made his debut with the Lithuanian EuroLeague club Žalgiris Kaunas in the 2003–04 season. He was originally an early entry candidate for the 2005 NBA draft before withdrawing his name from consideration.

Jankūnas averaged 13.8 points and 8.0 rebounds per game in the 2008–09 EuroLeague season and scored a season-high 23 points in a win against the Polish League club Asseco Prokom Sopot on 18 December 2008. However, Žalgiris Kaunas finished the season with a 2–8 record and did not qualify to the competition's Top 16 stage. Jankūnas was named the 2008–09 season's Baltic League MVP after averaging 15.4 points and 7.7 rebounds per game.

=== Khimki Moscow Region ===
On 14 August 2009, Jankūnas signed a two-year contract with the Russian EuroLeague club Khimki Moscow Region. He only played one season with Khimki Moscow Region (2009–10) and competed with them in three leagues that season (2009–10 EuroLeague, 2009–10 VTB United League and 2009–10 Russian Super League A).

=== Return to Žalgiris Kaunas ===
On 24 July 2010, it was announced that Jankūnas was coming back to Žalgiris Kaunas. In May 2018, he was named to the All-EuroLeague Second Team of the 2017–18 season.

During his time with Žalgiris Kaunas, Jankūnas helped the club to win thirteen Lithuanian League championships (2004, 2005, 2007, 2008, 2011–2019) and seven Lithuanian Cups, as he won five Lithuanian LKF Cups (2006, 2007, 2011, 2012, 2015) and two Lithuanian King Mindaugas Cups (2017, 2018). With Žalgiris Kaunas, he also won the Lithuanian Super Cup in 2012 and four Baltic League championships (2005, 2008, 2011, 2012).

On 12 August 2021, Jankūnas re-signed with the team. He played his last EuroLeague game on 3 April 2022, scoring 13 points in an overtime home victory over Crvena Zvezda. On 3 June 2022, Jankūnas officially retired from professional basketball.

== National team career ==
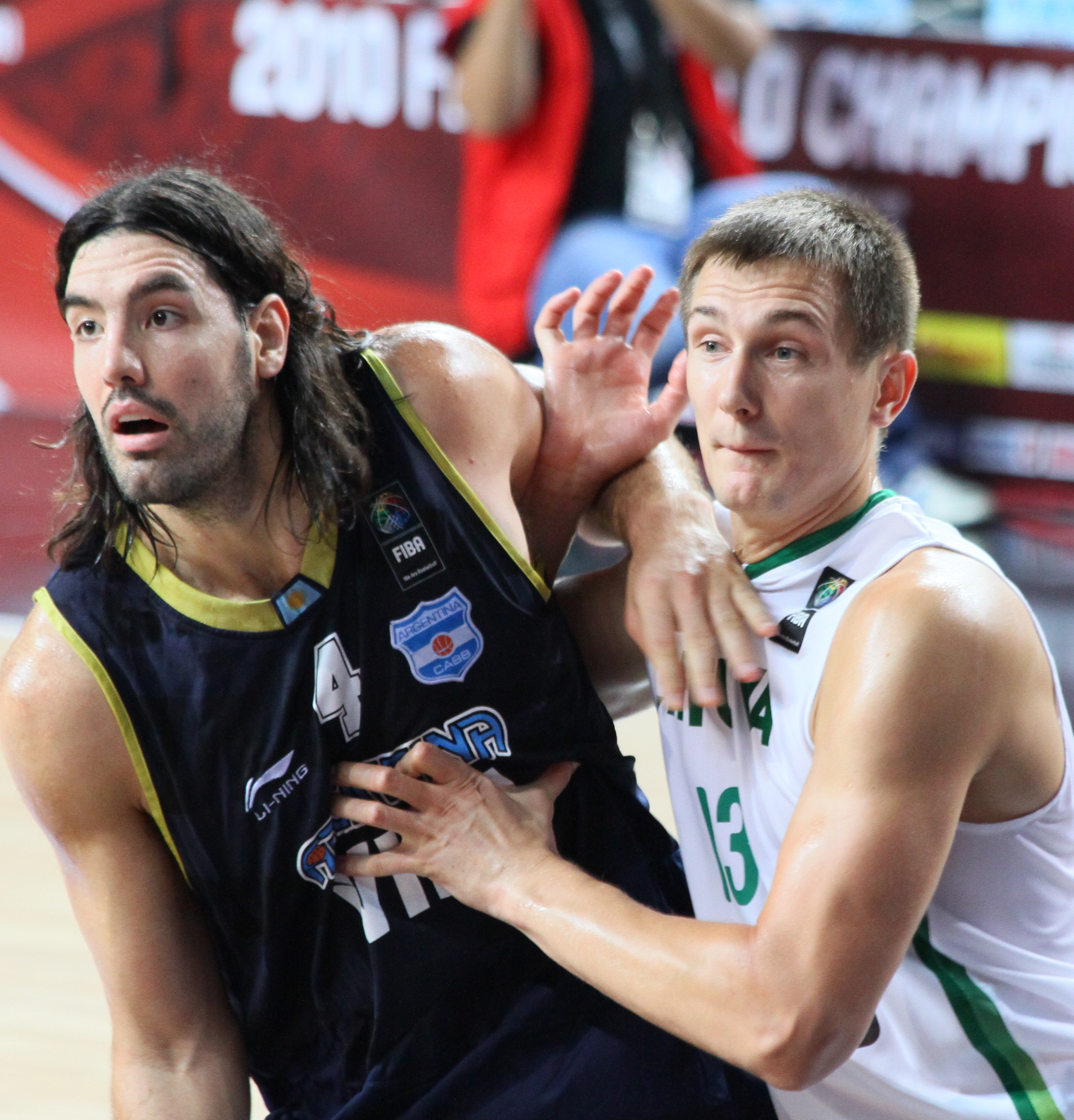
Jankūnas (right) with Lithuania in 2010

=== Lithuanian junior national team ===
Jankūnas was a member of the Lithuanian junior national teams. He played at the 2002 FIBA Europe Under-18 Championship and at the 2003 FIBA Under-19 World Cup, where the Lithuanians won silver medals. Jankūnas also won a bronze medal at the 2004 FIBA Europe Under-20 Championship, which he led in rebounding (12.3 rebounds per game) in addition to posting 12.5 points per game.

He also helped Lithuania win the gold medal at the 2005 FIBA Under-21 World Cup. He averaged 12.8 points and 8.6 rebounds per game during the tournament.

=== Lithuanian senior national team ===
Jankūnas was a member of the senior Lithuanian national team, for the first time at a major FIBA tournament, at the 2005 EuroBasket, where Lithuania finished in fifth place. During that tournament, he averaged 8.2 points and 4.0 rebounds per game. He also helped the Lithuanians win a bronze medal at the 2007 EuroBasket and another bronze medal at the 2010 FIBA World Championship. He won a silver medal with Lithuania at the 2015 EuroBasket.

Jankūnas also competed with Lithuania at the following tournaments: the 2006 FIBA World Championship, the 2011 EuroBasket, the 2012 FIBA World Olympic Qualifying Tournament, the 2012 Summer Olympics, the 2014 FIBA World Cup, the 2016 Summer Olympics and the 2019 FIBA World Cup.

== Player profile ==
A well built 2.05 m (6 ft. 8 3/4 in.) tall power forward, Jankūnas was a very good rebounder and scorer. He preferred to score on the inside and often drew fouls from opposing players. He could also play as a stretch four due to his consistent mid-range and three-point shot.

== Career statistics ==
Legend
GP	Games played	GS	Games started	MPG	Minutes per game
FG%	Field-goal percentage	3P%	3-point field-goal percentage	FT%	Free-throw percentage
RPG	Rebounds per game	APG	Assists per game	SPG	Steals per game
BPG	Blocks per game	PPG	Points per game	PIR	Performance index rating
**Bold**	Career high

=== EuroLeague ===
Year	Team	GP	GS	MPG	FG%	3P%	FT%	RPG	APG	SPG	BPG	PPG	PIR
2003–04	Žalgiris Kaunas	16	5	13.6	.526	.000	.636	2.9	.6	.5	.3	4.6	5.1
2004–05	Žalgiris Kaunas	20	12	18.8	.544	.143	.581	4.2	.6	.7	.1	6.2	7.7
2005–06	Žalgiris Kaunas	20	10	24.5	.468	.250	.714	6.8	1.1	.4	.3	10.8	12.3
2006–07	Žalgiris Kaunas	13	8	27.0	.483	.208	.673	4.2	1.0	**1.3**	.2	9.5	12.1
2007–08	Žalgiris Kaunas	20	19	21.6	.469	.324	.771	4.8	.8	.9	.4	8.6	9.4
2008–09	Žalgiris Kaunas	9	9	**31.1**	.440	.296	.778	**8.0**	1.2	1.0	**.6**	**13.8**	14.8
2009–10	Khimki Moscow	16	16	25.0	.475	.377	.773	4.9	.8	.8	.3	8.2	9.6
2010–11	Žalgiris Kaunas	16	8	26.3	.476	.152	.818	6.9	.9	.6	.4	9.4	11.7
2011–12	Žalgiris Kaunas	16	16	23.4	.447	.333	.727	5.6	.8	.8	.3	7.8	8.8
2012–13	Žalgiris Kaunas	17	16	24.8	.465	.292	.844	4.8	1.2	.8	.2	8.2	9.2
2013–14	Žalgiris Kaunas	21	21	26.2	.465	.257	.771	6.5	**1.9**	1.1	.3	8.8	12.0
2014–15	Žalgiris Kaunas	24	23	24.2	.480	.300	.800	6.5	1.1	.6	.5	9.1	12.0
2015–16	Žalgiris Kaunas	24	23	25.3	.540	.310	.838	6.2	1.5	.9	.2	12.3	15.5
2016–17	Žalgiris Kaunas	30	30	23.4	.548	.396	.868	6.1	1.5	.6	.4	13.0	**16.8**
2017–18	Žalgiris Kaunas	**35**	**34**	22.1	**.576**	.375	.833	4.9	1.4	.5	.3	11.3	13.7
2018–19	Žalgiris Kaunas	17	9	16.0	.500	.250	.892	3.1	.9	.2	.2	6.2	7.5
2019–20	Žalgiris Kaunas	27	12	13.7	.384	.143	.759	3.1	.8	.4	.1	3.0	4.9
2020–21	Žalgiris Kaunas	34	8	15.9	.436	.276	**.911**	4.4	1.0	.5	.1	3.9	7.1
2021–22	Žalgiris Kaunas	17	4	12.7	.423	**.409**	.909	2.6	.6	.5	.2	3.7	4.4
Career		392	283	21.4	.490	.297	.793	5.1	1.1	.6	.3	8.3	10.4

== Personal life ==
Jankūnas married his wife Ieva in the summer of 2007.

== State awards ==
- Lithuania: Recipient of the Commander's Cross of the Order for Merits to Lithuania (2007)
- Lithuania: Recipient of the Commander's Cross of the Order of the Lithuanian Grand Duke Gediminas (2010)
- Lithuania: Recipient of the Commander's Grand Cross of the Order for Merits to Lithuania (2015)
