= 2013–14 LKL season =

Lietuvos krepšinio lyga 2013-14
- League: Lietuvos krepšinio lyga
- Sport: Basketball
- Season MVP: (Colombia) Juan Palacios
- Finals champions: Žalgiris
- Runners-up: Neptūnas
- Finals MVP: (Lithuania) Paulius Jankūnas

LKL seasons
- ← 2012–13 2014–15 →

The 2013–14 Lietuvos krepšinio lyga was the 21st season of the top-tier level professional basketball league of Lithuania, the Lietuvos krepšinio lyga (LKL).

== Competition format ==
=== Regular season ===
During the regular season, which lasted from 26 September, until 27 April, all teams except Žalgiris, Lietuvos rytas and Neptūnas played 34 games (four against each other, and two against the three mentioned teams). The three mentioned teams only played twenty games, two against each team.

=== Playoff round ===
The top eight teams in the regular season round were divided up into pairs, and each pair played two games (a third game was played if each team in the pair won a game). The semifinals were also played in that format. The playoff round lasted from 28 April until 20 May.

The final round was played between the two winners of the semifinals. The final series for the first place were played in a best-of-seven format, while the series for the third place were played in a best-of-five format.

== Regular season ==
=== Standings ===
	Team	Pld	W	L	%	PF	PA	Qualification or relegation
1	Lietuvos rytas	20	18	2	.900	1770	1426	Qualified for playoffs
2	TonyBet	34	25	9	.735	2676	2552	Qualified for playoffs
3	Neptūnas	20	14	6	.700	1650	1545	Qualified for playoffs
4	Žalgiris	20	14	6	.700	1642	1428	Qualified for playoffs
5	Pieno žvaigždės	34	21	13	.618	2578	2424	Qualified for playoffs
6	Šiauliai	34	20	14	.588	2754	2550	Qualified for playoffs
7	Juventus	34	14	20	.412	2646	2633	Qualified for playoffs
8	Nevėžis	34	12	22	.353	2358	2529	Qualified for playoffs
9	Lietkabelis	34	12	22	.353	2432	2681	
10	Dzūkija	34	11	23	.324	2300	2580	
11	LSU-Atletas	34	5	29	.147	2470	2928	Relegated

=== Notable Matches ===
October 27, 2013
15:00

Report

Žalgiris	78–79	Šiauliai
Scoring by quarter: 20–24, 9–23, 18–17, 31–15
Pts: Dentmon 15; Rebs: Jankūnas, Javtokas 7 Asts: Dentmon 9		Pts: Needham 18; Rebs: Pakamanis, Dillard 6 Asts: Pakamanis 5

Kaunas, Lithuania
Attendance: 4000
Referees: Gintaras Vitkauskas, Rytis Sabas, Šarūnas Gabrilavičius

December 1, 2013
15:00

Report

TonyBet	101–83	Žalgiris
Scoring by quarter: 21–22, 29–13, 21–19, 30–29
Pts: Lukauskis 23; Rebs: Linkevičius 6 Asts: Valeika 9		Pts: Jankūnas 13; Rebs: Jankūnas, K.Lavrinovič 6 Asts: Jasikevičius 3

Prienai, Lithuania
Attendance: 1000
Referees: Romualdas Brazauskas, Martynas Gudas, Gintaras Mačiulis

December 22, 2013
16:00

Report

Lietuvos rytas	90–58	Žalgiris
Scoring by quarter: 30–16, 23–12, 18–12, 19–18
Pts: Seibutis, Babrauskas 17; Rebs: Palacios 11; Asts: Cook 6		Pts: 3 players 8 Rebs: 3 players 6 Asts: Dentmon, Čižauskas 3

Vilnius, Lithuania
Attendance: 10800
Referees: Tomas Jasevičius, Jurgis Laurinavičius, Vilius Mačiulaitis

January 28, 2014
19:00

Report

Neptūnas	81–73	Žalgiris
Scoring by quarter: 14–14, 25–14, 25–21, 17–24
Pts: Runkauskas 25; Rebs: Galdikas 8 Asts: Girdžiūnas, Butkevičius 4		Pts: Dentmon 18; Rebs: Jankūnas 9 Asts: Jankūnas 6

Klaipėda, Lithuania
Attendance: 5800
Referees: Tomas Jasevičius, Gintaras Vitkauskas, Ramūnas Žukauskas

April 5, 2014
17:00

Report

Šiauliai	89–84	Lietuvos rytas
Scoring by quarter: 19–16, 20–24, 20–19, 30–25
Pts: Leslie 20; Rebs: 5 players 4 Asts: Needham 5		Pts: Jelovac 21; Rebs: Palacios, Jelovac 5 Asts: 3 players 5

Šiauliai, Lithuania
Attendance: 2500
Referees: Jurgis Laurinavičius, Artūras Šukys, Šarūnas Gabrilavičius

April 7, 2014
19:00

Report

Žalgiris	79–88	Neptūnas
Scoring by quarter: 22–15, 20–27, 20–21, 17–25
Pts: Jankūnas 16; Rebs: Jankūnas 12; Asts: Jasikevičius 4		Pts: Mažeika 18; Rebs: Galdikas 9 Asts: Mažeika, Brazelton 5

Kaunas, Lithuania
Attendance: 3460
Referees: Tomas Jasevičius, Vilius Mačiulaitis, Gintaras Mačiulis

April 15, 2014
18:00

Report

Pieno žvaigždės	75–68	Lietuvos rytas
Scoring by quarter: 15–16, 19–14, 19–13, 22–25
Pts: Jonušas 18; Rebs: Jonušas 9 Asts: 3 players 2		Pts: Songaila 16; Rebs: Palacios 12; Asts: Gecevičius 4

Pasvalys, Lithuania
Attendance: 850
Referees: Jurgis Laurinavičius, Martynas Gudas, Danielius Bandzevičius

April 26, 2014
18:30

Report

Žalgiris	84–86	Lietuvos rytas
Scoring by quarter: 23–13, 25–21, 16–23, 20–29
Pts: Jankūnas 22; Rebs: Jankūnas 11; Asts: Dentmon 4		Pts: Dowdell 18; Rebs: Jelovac 3 Asts: Seibutis 4

Kaunas, Lithuania
Attendance: 10250
Referees: Tomas Jasevičius, Antanas Ramanauskas, Gytis Vilius

== Playoffs ==
=== Bracket ===
Quarterfinals
1	Lietuvos rytas	2
8	Nevėžis	0
4	Žalgiris	2
5	Pieno žvaigždės	0
2	TonyBet	2
7	Juventus	0
3	Neptūnas	2
6	Šiauliai	1

Semifinals
1	Lietuvos rytas	1
4	Žalgiris	2
2	TonyBet	0
3	Neptūnas	2

'finals
4	Žalgiris	4
3	Neptūnas	2
Third place
1	Lietuvos rytas	3
2	TonyBet	0

== Statistics ==
Points

Rank	Name	G	Pts	PPG
1	(United States) Travis Leslie	18	274	15.2
2	(Lithuania) Gintaras Leonavičius	34	510	15.0
3	(Lithuania) Mindaugas Lukauskis	27	390	14.4
4	(Colombia) Juan Palacios	18	257	14.3
5	(Lithuania) Egidijus Dimša	33	457	13.9

Rebounds

Rank	Name	G	Reb	RPG
1	(Russia) Ivan Nelyubov	18	150	8.3
2	(Lithuania) Tomas Urbonas	24	197	8.2
3	(Lithuania) Paulius Jankūnas	18	142	7.9
4	(Lithuania) Giedrius Staniulis	24	187	7.8
5	(Lithuania) Valdas Dabkus	20	154	7.7

Assists

Rank	Name	G	Ast	APG
1	(United States) Omar Cook	18	114	6.3
2	(Lithuania) Karolis Babkauskas	31	181	5.8
3	(Lithuania) Rolandas Alijevas	32	147	4.6
4	(Lithuania) Aidas Viskontas	34	150	4.4
5	(Lithuania) Žygimantas Janavičius	30	132	4.4

Updated: 26 May 2014
