= Marcus Brown =

American basketball player (born 1974)

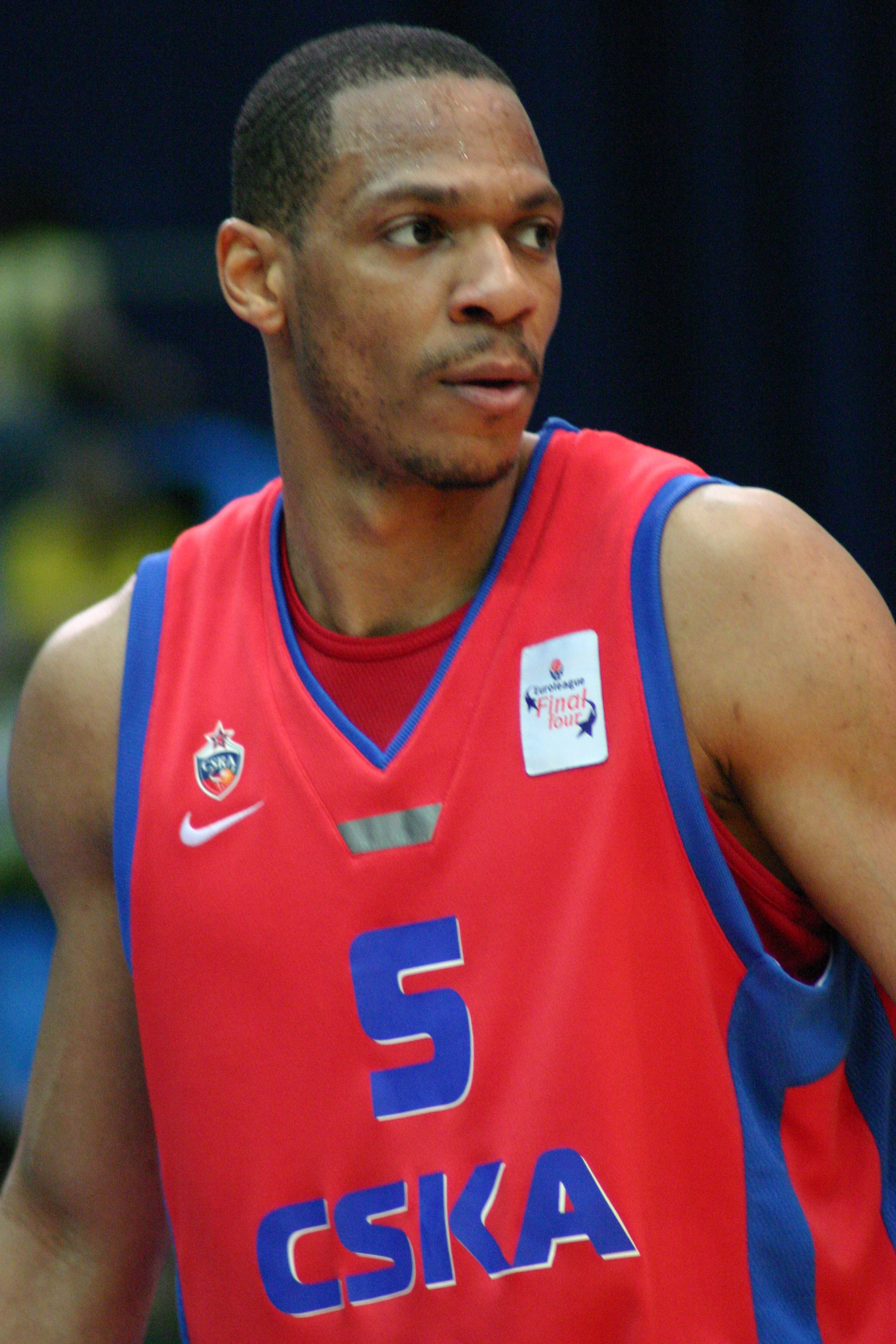
- Brown with CSKA Moscow in 2005

Personal information
- Born: April 3, 1974 (age 52) West Memphis, Arkansas, U.S.
- Listed height: 6 ft 7 in (2.01 m)
- Listed weight: 198 lb (90 kg)

Career information
- High school: West Memphis (West Memphis, Arkansas)
- College: Murray State (1992–1996)
- NBA draft: 1996: 2nd round, 46th overall pick
- Drafted by: Portland Trail Blazers
- Playing career: 1996–2011
- Position: Shooting guard / point guard
- Number: 4, 20

Career history
- 1996–1997: Portland Trail Blazers
- 1998: Pau-Orthez
- 1999: Detroit Pistons
- 1999–2000: Limoges
- 2000–2001: Benetton Treviso
- 2001–2003: Efes Pilsen
- 2003–2005: CSKA Moscow
- 2005–2007: Unicaja Málaga
- 2007–2011: Žalgiris Kaunas
- 2008–2009: →Maccabi Tel Aviv

Career highlights
- All-EuroLeague First Team (2004); 2× All-EuroLeague Second Team (2003, 2005); French League Foreign Player's MVP (2000); Russian Super League A Player of the Year (2004); 3× Lithuanian League All-Star (2008, 2010, 2011); 2× LKL champion (2008, 2011); LKL Finals MVP (2008); 2× BBL champion (2008, 2011); BBL Finals MVP (2010); 2× OVC Player of the Year (1995, 1996); No. 5 retired by Murray State Racers
- Stats at NBA.com
- Stats at Basketball Reference

Marcus Brown (born April 3, 1974) is an American former professional basketball player. At 6 ft 3 in (1.91 m) tall, he played as a shooting guard. A three time All-EuroLeague selection, Brown has been mentioned as being one of the top U.S. players ever to play abroad. Brown ended his career as a player-coach with Žalgiris Kaunas in 2011. Brown was the EuroLeague's career scoring leader since the year 2000, when he ended his career in October 2011. As far as United States players only are concerned, Brown remains one of league's higher scoring players in the competition since the year 2000, when the league's current organizer (EuroLeague Basketball) took over the competition.

== College career ==
Brown played college basketball for the Murray State Racers in the Ohio Valley Conference. In his senior season, he averaged 26.4 points per game, on 50 percent shooting from the field, and 42 percent shooting from 3-point range. It was announced in October 2009, that Brown was named to the Murray State University Athletic Hall of Fame. He was inducted into the Hall of Fame on February 6, 2010. That same night, his No. 5 jersey was retired by Murray State, and is hanging in the rafters at the CFSB Center.

== Professional career ==
Brown was selected with the 19 th pick of the 2nd round, in the 1996 NBA draft, by the NBA club the Portland Trail Blazers. He played the 1996–97 NBA season with the Trail Blazers, where he averaged 4 points per game, in 9 minutes per game, while shooting 41 percent from 3 point range, in his rookie season. He then signed with the Vancouver Grizzlies for the 1997–98 season, but he did not play in any regular season games for them.

After being released by the Grizzlies, during the 1997–98 NBA season, he signed with the French League club ÉB Pau-Orthez, for the remainder of the 1997–98 season. He averaged 20.5 points per game in the French League with Pau-Orthez, and led them to the 1998 French League championship. Unfortunately, Brown tore the ACL in his knee in the final game of the French playoffs.

Brown took off the entire 1998–99 season to rehab his knee injury. He then played in the NBA again, with the Detroit Pistons, at the start of the 1999–00 season. The Pistons released him in 1999, after he played with the club in 6 regular season games. He then returned to the French League, where he signed with CSP Limoges for the remainder of the 1999–00 season. With Limoges, he won the French League championship, the French Cup title, and the FIBA Korać Cup championship. He was named the French League Foreign Player's MVP.

After having a lot of success in the French League for 2 seasons, he then moved up to the higher level Italian League, where he signed with the Italian EuroLeague club Benetton Treviso for the 2000–01 season. With Benetton he played in the EuroLeague for the first time, and he averaged 19.9 points per game that season in the EuroLeague. After that season, he signed with one of the biggest clubs in the EuroLeague, the Turkish League club Efes Pilsen.

Over the next two seasons with Efes, Brown was very successful in Turkey, as he won the Turkish Cup, and 2 Turkish League national championships. He was also named to the 2002–03 season's All-EuroLeague Second Team, after he averaged 19.6 points per game. Brown then moved to the Russian Super League powerhouse CSKA Moscow, where he signed a contract that made him the highest paid American basketball player in Europe at that time.

Over the next two seasons with CSKA, he was quite successful in Russia, as he won the Russian Cup, 2 Russian National Championships, and the Russian Super League A Player of the Year award in 2004. He was also named to the 2003–04 season's All-EuroLeague First Team and to the 2004–05 season's All-EuroLeague Second Team, while he was a member of CSKA.

Brown then spent the next two seasons playing with Unicaja Málaga of the Spanish ACB League, where over those 2 years he would play alongside fellow ex-NBA players Daniel Santiago, Pepe Sánchez, Jorge Garbajosa, and Jiří Welsch. He helped to lead Unicaja Málaga to its first ever Spanish League national championship, during the 2005–06 season.

After spending two seasons with Málaga, Brown joined the Lithuanian League club Žalgiris Kaunas. With Zalgiris, in the 2007–08 season, Brown won the Lithuanian League national championship, the Lithuanian Cup title, and the Baltic League championship, all in the same season. He was also named the MVP of the Lithuanian League playoff finals that season.

On October 19, 2008, Brown was loaned from (Žalgiris) and signed with the EuroLeague club Maccabi Tel Aviv of the Israeli League, for the 2008–09 season, and with them he won yet another national domestic championship, in May 2009.

Brown rejoined (Žalgiris) in 2009, and helped the team win the BBL Cup. In his final season, Brown helped Žalgiris win the triple crown in Lithuania, winning the LKF Cup, LKL championship and the BBL.

On November 25, 2009, Brown became one of four players who had managed to make 300 or more three point shots in the EuroLeague at that time, counting only records since the year 2000.

== Post-career honors ==
On October 17, 2011, his former team, Žalgiris Kaunas, held a ceremony to honor Brown during the halftime of the opening night of the 2011–12 season, in the club's new 15,552-seat arena in Kaunas, Lithuania.

In January 2013, the Arkansas Sports Hall of Fame announced that Brown would be honored as a member of the class of 2013 inductees which included Dallas Cowboy owner Jerry Jones.

== Player profile ==
Brown, who during his playing career, was a 6-foot-3-inch (191 cm) shooting guard, scored more points than any other U.S. player in the EuroLeague, counting only EuroLeague records since the 2000–01 season, with 2,739 career points scored. He was also the league's leading scorer overall, since the year 2000, at the time that he retired from the league, in 2011.

A high-quality player, who was always able to make a big impact in top-level European teams, Brown played at the EuroLeague Final Four in 2004, 2005, and 2007. He also earned All-EuroLeague Team selections in the 2002–03, 2003–04, and 2004–05 seasons. He was selected to the All-EuroLeague Second Team for the 2002–03 season, when he played for Efes Pilsen, and he was selected to the All-EuroLeague First Team for the 2003–04 season, and to the Second Team for the 2004–05 season, when he played for CSKA Moscow. He was nominated for the 2008 50 Greatest EuroLeague Contributors list, although he was not selected to the final list. He also nominated for the EuroLeague 2000–10 All-Decade Team, however he was not selected to the final list.

== Personal achievements and awards ==
- 1999–00 French League Foreign Player's MVP (CSP Limoges)
- 2001–02 EuroLeague Round 19 MVP (Efes Pilsen)
- 2002–03 All-EuroLeague Second Team (Efes Pilsen)
- 2002–03 EuroLeague Round 17 MVP (Efes Pilsen)
- 2003–04 All-EuroLeague First Team (CSKA Moscow)
- 2003–04 Russian Super League A Player of the Year
- 2004–05 EuroLeague April MVP (CSKA Moscow)
- 2004–05 All-EuroLeague Second Team (CSKA Moscow)
- 2007–08 EuroLeague December MVP (Žalgiris)
- 2007–08 Lithuanian League Finals MVP (Žalgiris)
- 2009–10 Baltic League Finals MVP (Žalgiris)

== Club titles won ==
- 1997–98 French League (ÉB Pau-Orthez)
- 1999–00 FIBA Korać Cup (CSP Limoges)
- 1999–00 French League (CSP Limoges)
- 1999–00 French Cup (CSP Limoges)
- 2001–02 Turkish Cup (Efes Pilsen)
- 2001–02 Turkish League (Efes Pilsen)
- 2003–04 Russian League (CSKA Moscow)
- 2004–05 Russian League (CSKA Moscow)
- 2004–05 Russian Cup (CSKA Moscow)
- 2005–06 Spanish League (Málaga)
- 2007–08 Lithuanian Cup (Žalgiris)
- 2007–08 Baltic League (Žalgiris)
- 2007–08 Lithuanian League (Žalgiris)
- 2008–09 Israeli League (Maccabi Tel Aviv)
- 2009–10 Baltic Cup (Žalgiris)
- 2009–10 Baltic League (Žalgiris)
- 2010–11 Lithuanian Cup (Žalgiris)
- 2010–11 Baltic League (Žalgiris)
- 2010–11 Lithuanian League (Žalgiris)

== Career statistics ==
Legend
GP	Games played	GS	Games started	MPG	Minutes per game
FG%	Field-goal percentage	3P%	3-point field-goal percentage	FT%	Free-throw percentage
RPG	Rebounds per game	APG	Assists per game	SPG	Steals per game
BPG	Blocks per game	PPG	Points per game	PIR	Performance index rating
**Bold**	Career high

=== EuroLeague ===
Year	Team	GP	GS	MPG	FG%	3P%	FT%	RPG	APG	SPG	BPG	PPG	PIR
2000–01	Benetton	10	8	35.3	.496	.424	.875	**3.1**	2.8	**2.0**	.0	**20.3**	21.2
2001–02	Efes Pilsen	19	17	34.9	.453	.423	.880	2.9	3.4	1.8	.1	17.5	18.0
2002–03	Efes Pilsen	19	17	**35.4**	**.513**	**.442**	.843	2.6	2.6	1.3	.1	19.6	21.4
2003–04	CSKA	21	21	34.3	.510	.382	.880	2.3	**4.2**	1.4	.1	18.7	**21.6**
2004–05	CSKA	**24**	**24**	32.4	.428	.330	.804	2.9	3.1	1.3	.0	16.0	16.8
2005–06	Unicaja	20	20	31.9	.434	.368	.845	2.7	2.5	.7	**.3**	15.3	14.7
2006–07	Unicaja	8	2	19.2	.354	.350	.938	1.5	1.3	.5	.0	7.0	4.6
2007–08	Žalgiris	20	20	29.9	.474	.418	.906	2.4	1.4	.6	.2	14.4	12.8
2008–09	Maccabi	16	15	29.7	.478	.417	.782	2.3	2.2	.6	.0	12.3	12.1
2009–10	Žalgiris	16	16	25.4	.393	.397	.936	2.0	1.7	.5	.1	11.6	10.2
2010–11	Žalgiris	6	3	16.3	.235	.308	**1.000**	1.2	.8	.2	.2	3.7	-.5
Career		179	163	31.0	.458	.395	.857	2.5	2.6	1.0	.1	15.3	15.4

=== NBA ===
Year	Team	GP	GS	MPG	FG%	3P%	FT%	RPG	APG	SPG	BPG	PPG
1996–97	Portland	**21**	0	**8.8**	**.400**	**.406**	.684	.7	**1.0**	**.4**	**.1**	**3.9**
1999–00	Detroit	6	0	7.5	.286	.000	**1.000**	**1.2**	.5	.0	.0	1.7
Career		27	0	8.5	.381	.333	.714	.8	.9	.3	.0	3.4

== References and notes ==
- "Reigning King of Europe". ESPN".
- "Players In Europe Ponder A N.B.A. Pension". The New York Times. December 13, 2009.
- "Top Five U.S. Athletes To Play Abroad Team Sports". Bleacher Report. June 12, 2009. Archived from the original on October 9, 2012.
