= 2003–04 Euroleague =

Sports season

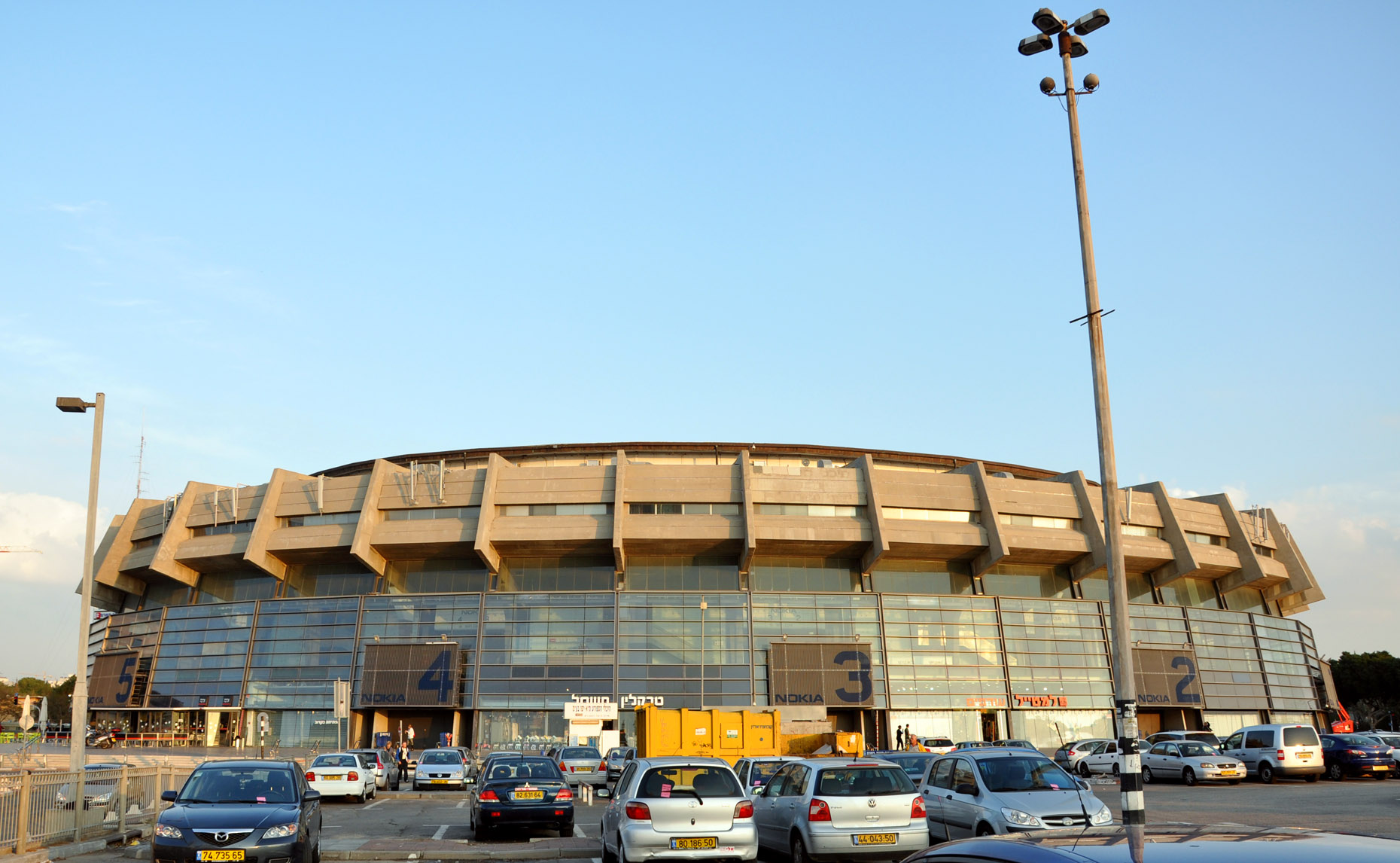
- The Final Four was held at the Nokia Arena in Tel Aviv
- Teams: 24

Finals
- Champions: (Israel) Maccabi Elite Tel Aviv (4th title)
- Runners-up: (Italy) Skipper Bologna
- Third place: (Russia) CSKA Moscow
- Fourth place: (Italy) Montepaschi Siena

Awards
- Regular Season MVP: (Lithuania) Arvydas Sabonis
- Top 16 MVP: (Lithuania) Arvydas Sabonis
- Final Four MVP: (United States) Anthony Parker

Statistical leaders
Points	(United States) Lynn Greer	25.1
Rebounds	(Lithuania) Arvydas Sabonis	10.7
Assists	(United States) Ed Cota	5.7
Index Rating	(Lithuania) Arvydas Sabonis	26.3

The 2003–04 Euroleague was the fourth season of the professional basketball competition for elite clubs throughout Europe, organised by Euroleague Basketball Company, and it was the 47th season of the premier competition for European men's clubs overall. The 2003–04 season featured 24 competing teams from 13 countries. The final of the competition was held in Nokia Arena, Tel Aviv, Israel, with hosts Maccabi Elite Tel Aviv, defeating Skipper Bologna, by a score of 118–74.

== Team allocation ==
=== Distribution ===
The table below shows the default access list.

	Teams entering in this round
Regular season (24 teams)	15 teams with 3-year licences; 2 best-placed teams from: Spain; 1 best-placed team from: Germany; Greece; Israel; Italy; Slovenia; Yugoslavia; 1 Wild card
Top 16 (16 teams)	3 group winners from the regular season; 3 group runners-up from the regular season; 3 group third-placed teams from the regular season; 3 group fourth-placed teams from the regular season; 3 group fifth-placed teams from the regular season; 1 group sixth-placed team from the regular season
Final four (4 teams)	4 group winners from the top 16

=== Teams ===
The labels in the parentheses show how each team qualified for the place of its starting round (TH: EuroLeague title holders)

- Licensed clubs: 3-year licence
- 1st, 2nd, etc.: League position after Playoffs
- WC: Wild card

Regular season
Licensed clubs
(Italy) Benetton Treviso (1st)	(Greece) Olympiacos (4th)	(Lithuania) Žalgiris (1st)
(Italy) Skipper Bologna (2nd)	(Spain) FC Barcelona (1st)^{TH}	(Russia) CSKA Moscow (1st)
(Italy) Montepaschi Siena (4th)	(Spain) Tau Cerámica (6th)	(Slovenia) Union Olimpija (2nd)
(France) Pau-Orthez (1st)	(Turkey) Efes Pilsen (1st)	
(France) Adecco ASVEL (2nd)	(Turkey) Ülker (2nd)	
(Greece) AEK (2nd)	(Croatia) Cibona VIP (2nd)	
Associated clubs
(Italy) Lottomatica Roma (3rd)	(Spain) Pamesa Valencia (2nd)	(Poland) Idea Śląsk (3rd)^{WC}
(Greece) Panathinaikos (1st)	(Spain) Unicaja Málaga (3rd)	(Slovenia) Krka (1st)
(Germany) ALBA Berlin (1st)	(Israel) Maccabi Elite (1st)	(Federal Republic of Yugoslavia) Partizan Mobtel (1st)

== Regular season ==
The first phase was a regular season, in which the competing teams were drawn into three groups, each containing eight teams. Each team played every other team in its group at home and away, resulting in 14 games for each team in the first stage. The top 5 teams in each group and the best sixth-placed team advanced to the next round. The complete list of tiebreakers was provided in the lead-in to the Regular Season results.

If one or more clubs were level on won-lost record, tiebreakers were applied in the following order:

1. Head-to-head record in matches between the tied clubs
2. Overall point difference in games between the tied clubs
3. Overall point difference in all group matches (first tiebreaker if tied clubs were not in the same group)
4. Points scored in all group matches
5. Sum of quotients of points scored and points allowed in each group match

Key to colors
Top five places in each group, plus highest-ranked sixth-place team, advanced to Top 16

=== Group A ===
	Team	Pld	W	L	PF	PA	Diff
1.	(Spain) FC Barcelona	14	12	2	1086	937	+149
2.	(Croatia) Cibona VIP	14	8	6	1122	1101	+21
3.	(Turkey) Ülker	14	8	6	1023	1050	-27
4.	(Slovenia) Union Olimpija	14	6	8	1093	1123	-30
5.	(France) Pau-Orthez	14	6	8	1141	1130	+11
6.	(Greece) AEK	14	6	8	1066	1099	-33
7.	(Serbia and Montenegro) Partizan Mobtel	14	6	8	1081	1078	+3
8.	(Italy) Lottomatica Roma	14	4	10	997	1091	-94

=== Group B ===
	Team	Pld	W	L	PF	PA	Diff
1.	(Russia) CSKA Moscow	14	11	3	1118	984	+134
2.	(Israel) Maccabi Elite Tel Aviv	14	11	3	1261	1169	+92
3.	(Italy) Skipper Bologna	14	8	6	1206	1173	+33
4.	(Italy) Montepaschi Siena	14	8	6	1142	1142	0
5.	(Greece) Panathinaikos	14	7	7	1141	1113	+28
6.	(Lithuania) Žalgiris	14	6	8	1083	1068	+15
7.	(Spain) Unicaja Málaga	14	4	10	1051	1111	-60
8.	(Slovenia) Krka	14	2	12	947	1189	-242

=== Group C ===
	Team	Pld	W	L	PF	PA	Diff
1.	(Turkey) Efes Pilsen	14	10	4	1066	1002	+64
2.	(Italy) Benetton Treviso	14	10	4	1185	1067	+118
3.	(Spain) Pamesa Valencia	14	9	5	1149	1089	+60
4.	(Spain) Tau Cerámica	14	9	5	1183	1127	+56
5.	(Greece) Olympiacos	14	7	7	1109	1108	+1
6.	(Poland) Idea Śląsk Wrocław	14	6	8	1110	1163	-53
7.	(Germany) Alba Berlin	14	3	11	1075	1170	-95
8.	(France) Adecco ASVEL	14	2	12	982	1133	-151

== Top 16 ==
The surviving teams were divided into four groups of four teams each, and again a round robin system was adopted resulting in 6 games each, with the top team advancing to the Final Four. Tiebreakers were identical to those used in the Regular Season.

This was the last season in which teams advanced directly from the Top 16 to the Final Four. A quarterfinal round was introduced in the 2004–05 season.

The draw was held in accordance with Euroleague rules.

The teams were placed into four pools, as follows:

Level 1: The three group winners, plus the top-ranked second-place team

- CSKA Moscow, FC Barcelona, Maccabi Elite Tel Aviv, Efes Pilsen

Level 2: The remaining second-place teams, plus the top two third-place teams

- Skipper Bologna, Pamesa Valencia, Benetton Treviso, Cibona

Level 3: The remaining third-place team, plus the three fourth-place teams

- Union Olimpija, Ülker, Montepaschi Siena, Tau Cerámica

Level 4: The fifth-place teams, plus the top ranked sixth-place team

- Pau-Orthez, Panathinaikos, Olympiacos, Žalgiris

Each Top 16 group included one team from each pool. The draw was conducted under the following restrictions:

1. No more than two teams from the same Regular Season group could be placed in the same Top 16 group.
2. No more than two teams from the same country could be placed in the same Top 16 group.
3. If there is a conflict between these two restrictions, (1) would receive priority.

Another draw was held to determine the order of fixtures. In the case of two teams from the same city in the Top 16 (Panathinaikos and Olympiacos, Efes Pilsen and Ülker) they were scheduled so that every week only one team would be at home.

Key to colors
Top place in each group advanced to Final four

=== Group D ===
	Team	Pld	W	L	PF	PA	Diff
1.	(Russia) CSKA Moscow	6	5	1	477	436	+41
2.	(Spain) Tau Cerámica	6	4	2	505	477	+28
3.	(Croatia) Cibona VIP	6	2	4	422	449	-27
4.	(Greece) Olympiacos	6	1	5	436	477	-41

=== Group E ===
	Team	Pld	W	L	PF	PA	Diff
1.	(Italy) Skipper Bologna	6	5	1	484	457	+27
2.	(Turkey) Efes Pilsen	6	4	2	427	390	+37
3.	(France) Pau-Orthez	6	2	4	452	486	−34
4.	(Slovenia) Union Olimpija	6	1	5	438	468	−30

=== Group F ===
	Team	Pld	W	L	PF	PA	Diff
1.	(Italy) Montepaschi Siena	6	4	2	498	461	+37
2.	(Italy) Benetton Treviso	6	4	2	510	494	+16
3.	(Spain) FC Barcelona	6	2	4	445	452	−7
4.	(Greece) Panathinaikos	6	2	4	460	506	−46

=== Group G ===
	Team	Pld	W	L	PF	PA	Diff
1.	(Israel) Maccabi Elite Tel Aviv	6	4	2	452	406	+46
2.	(Spain) Pamesa Valencia	6	4	2	418	421	-3
3.	(Lithuania) Žalgiris	6	3	3	520	507	+13
4.	(Turkey) Ülker	6	1	5	449	505	−56

== Final four ==
=== Semifinals ===
April 29, Nokia Arena, Tel Aviv

Team 1	Score	Team 2
Montepaschi Siena (Italy)	102–103	(Italy) Skipper Bologna
Maccabi Elite Tel Aviv (Israel)	93–85	(Russia) CSKA Moscow

=== 3rd place game ===
May 1, Nokia Arena, Tel Aviv

Team 1	Score	Team 2
Montepaschi Siena (Italy)	94–97	(Russia) CSKA Moscow

=== Final ===
May 1, Nokia Arena, Tel Aviv

Team 1	Score	Team 2
Maccabi Elite Tel Aviv (Israel)	118–74	(Italy) Skipper Bologna

2003–04 Euroleague Champions

Maccabi Elite Tel Aviv
4th Title

=== Final standings ===
	Team
	(Israel) Maccabi Elite Tel Aviv
2nd place, silver medalist(s)	(Italy) Skipper Bologna
3rd place, bronze medalist(s)	(Russia) CSKA Moscow
	(Italy) Montepaschi Siena

== Awards ==
=== Top Scorer ===
- (United States) Lynn Greer ( (Poland) Śląsk Wrocław)

=== Regular season MVP ===
- (Lithuania) Arvydas Sabonis ( (Lithuania) Žalgiris)

=== Top 16 MVP ===
- (Lithuania) Arvydas Sabonis ( (Lithuania) Žalgiris)

=== Final Four MVP ===
- (United States) Anthony Parker ( (Israel) Maccabi Elite Tel Aviv)

=== Finals Top Scorer ===
- (United States) Anthony Parker ( (Israel) Maccabi Elite Tel Aviv) & (Serbia and Montenegro) Miloš Vujanić ( (Italy) Skipper Bologna)

=== All-Euroleague First Team ===
- (Lithuania) Šarūnas Jasikevičius ( (Israel) Maccabi Elite Tel Aviv)
- (United States) Marcus Brown ( (Russia) CSKA Moscow)
- (Serbia and Montenegro) Dejan Bodiroga ( (Spain) FC Barcelona)
- (Turkey) Mirsad Türkcan ( (Russia) CSKA Moscow)
- (Lithuania) Arvydas Sabonis ( (Lithuania) Žalgiris)

=== All-Euroleague Second Team ===
- (Serbia and Montenegro) Miloš Vujanić ( (Italy) Skipper Bologna)
- (United States) Lynn Greer ( (Poland) Śląsk Wrocław)
- (Belgium) David Vanterpool ( (Italy) Montepaschi Siena)
- (Argentina) Andrés Nocioni ( (Spain) Tau Cerámica)
- (Croatia) Nikola Vujčić ( (Israel) Maccabi Elite Tel Aviv)
