= 2004–05 Euroleague =

Sports season

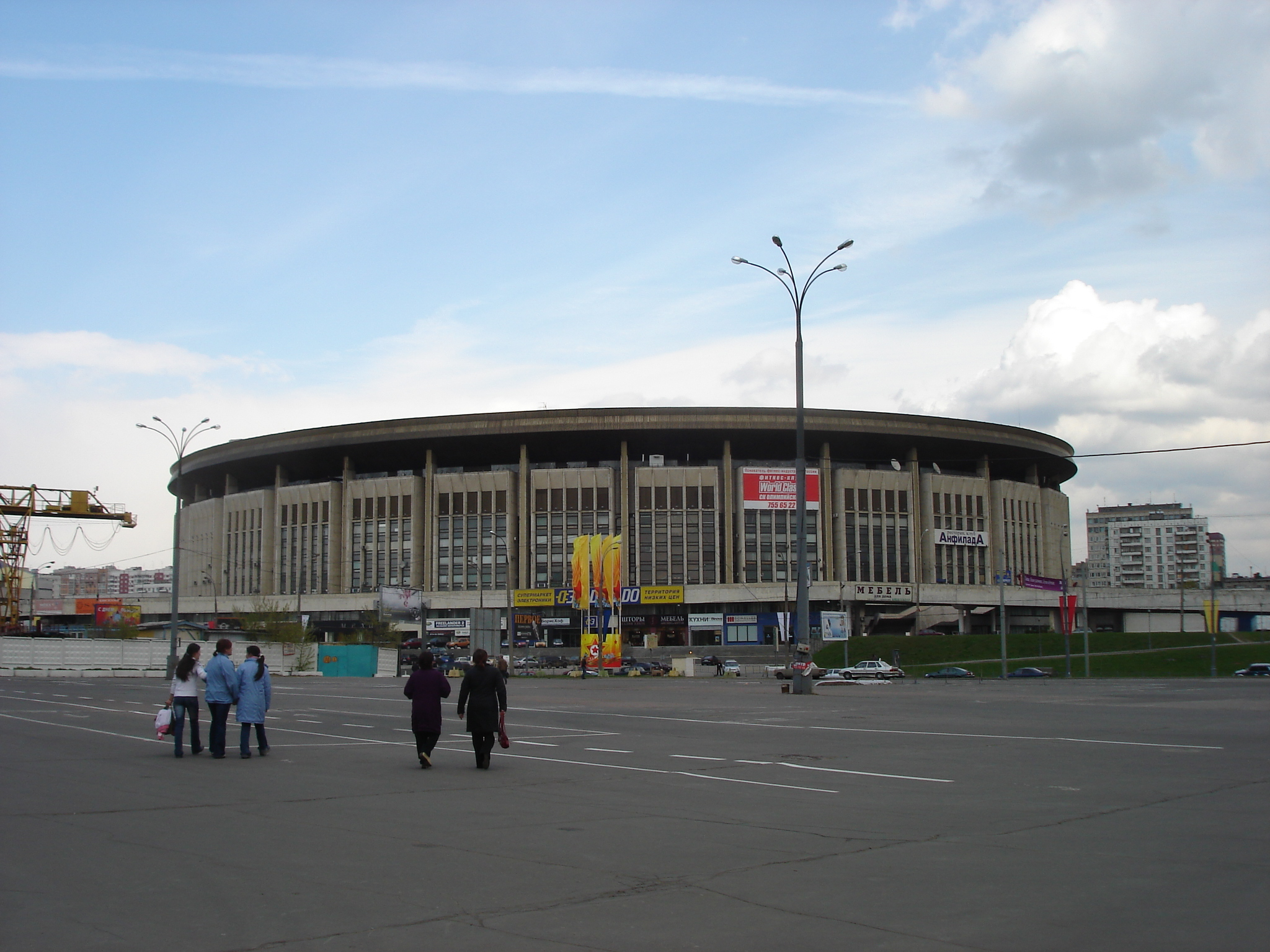
- The Olimpiisky Arena in Moscow hosted the Final Four
- Season: 2004–05
- Teams: 24

Regular season
- Season MVP: (United States) Anthony Parker (Maccabi Tel Aviv)

Finals
- Champions: (Israel) Maccabi Tel Aviv (5th title)
- Runners-up: (Spain) Tau Cerámica
- Third place: (Greece) Panathinaikos
- Fourth place: (Russia) CSKA Moscow
- Final Four MVP: (Lithuania) Šarūnas Jasikevičius (Maccabi Tel Aviv)

Statistical leaders
Points	(United States) Charles Smith	20.7
Rebounds	(United States) Tanoka Beard	10.6
Assists	(United States) Mire Chatman	6.2
Index Rating	(United States) Anthony Parker	24.9

The 2004–05 Euroleague was the fifth season of the professional basketball competition for elite clubs throughout Europe, organised by Euroleague Basketball Company, and it was the 48th season of the premier competition for European men's clubs overall. The 2004–05 season featured 24 competing teams, from 13 countries. The final of the competition was held in Olimpiisky Arena, Moscow, Russia, with the defending champions, Maccabi Tel Aviv, defeating Tau Cerámica by a score of 90–78.

== Team allocation ==
=== Distribution ===
The table below shows the default access list.

	Teams entering in this round
Regular season (24 teams)	15 teams with 3-year licences; 2 best-placed teams from: Spain; The champion teams from: Germany; Greece; Israel; Italy; Poland; Yugoslavia; 1 Wild card
Top 16 (16 teams)	3 group winners from the regular season; 3 group runners-up from the regular season; 3 group third-placed teams from the regular season; 3 group fourth-placed teams from the regular season; 3 group fifth-placed teams from the regular season; 1 group sixth placed team from the regular season
Quarterfinals (8 teams)	4 group winners from the top 16; 4 group runners-up from the top 16

=== Teams ===
The labels in the parentheses show how each team qualified for the place of its starting round (TH: EuroLeague title holders)

- Licensed clubs: 3-year licence
- 1st, 2nd, etc.: League position after Playoffs
- WC: Wild card

Regular season
Licensed clubs
(Italy) Montepaschi Siena (1st)	(Greece) Olympiacos (8th)	(Lithuania) Žalgiris (1st)
(Italy) Climamio Bologna (2nd)	(Spain) Winterthur Barcelona (1st)	(Russia) CSKA Moscow (1st)
(Italy) Benetton Treviso (3rd)	(Spain) Tau Cerámica (4th)	(Slovenia) Union Olimpija (1st)
(France) Pau-Orthez (1st)	(Turkey) Efes Pilsen (1st)	
(France) Adecco ASVEL (11th)	(Turkey) Ülker (2nd)	
(Greece) AEK (4th)	(Croatia) Cibona VIP (1st)	
Associated clubs
(Italy) Scavolini Pesaro (4th)	(Spain) Adecco Estudiantes (2nd)	(Israel) Maccabi Elite (1st)^{TH}
(Greece) Panathinaikos (1st)	(Spain) Unicaja Málaga (3rd)	(Poland) Prokom Trefl Sopot (1st)
(Germany) Opel Skyliners (1st)	(Spain) Real Madrid (5th)^{WC}	(Serbia and Montenegro) Partizan Pivara MB (1st)

== Regular season ==
The first phase was a regular season, in which the competing teams were drawn into three groups, each containing eight teams. Each team played every other team in its group at home and away, resulting in 14 games for each team in the first stage. The top 5 teams in each group and the best sixth-placed team advanced to the next round. The complete list of tiebreakers was provided in the lead-in to the Regular Season results.

If one or more clubs were level on won-lost record, tiebreakers were applied in the following order:

1. Head-to-head record in matches between the tied clubs
2. Overall point difference in games between the tied clubs
3. Overall point difference in all group matches (first tiebreaker if tied clubs were not in the same group)
4. Points scored in all group matches
5. Sum of quotients of points scored and points allowed in each group match

Key to colors
Top five places in each group, plus highest-ranked sixth-place team, advanced to Top 16

=== Group A ===
	Team	Pld	W	L	PF	PA	Diff
1.	(Italy) Climamio Bologna	14	12	2	1199	1103	+96
2.	(Turkey) Efes Pilsen	14	12	2	1080	934	+146
3.	(Croatia) Cibona VIP	14	8	6	1172	1037	+47
4.	(Spain) Real Madrid	14	7	7	1056	1020	+36
5.	(Poland) Prokom Trefl Sopot	14	7	7	981	1028	-47
6.	(Spain) Adecco Estudiantes	14	4	10	1074	1109	-35
7.	(Greece) Olympiacos	14	4	10	1017	1144	-127
8.	(Serbia and Montenegro) Partizan Pivara MB	14	2	12	1030	1146	-116

=== Group B ===
	Team	Pld	W	L	PF	PA	Diff
1.	(Israel) Maccabi Elite Tel Aviv	14	10	4	1324	1189	+135
2.	(Spain) Winterthur FC Barcelona	14	9	5	1071	1045	+26
3.	(Lithuania) Žalgiris	14	8	6	1185	1180	+5
4.	(Greece) AEK	14	7	7	1102	1106	-4
5.	(Italy) Montepaschi Siena	14	7	7	1105	1049	56
6.	(Italy) Scavolini Pesaro	14	7	7	1116	1168	-52
7.	(Slovenia) Union Olimpija	14	6	8	1040	1058	-18
8.	(France) Adecco ASVEL	14	2	12	973	1121	-148

=== Group C ===
	Team	Pld	W	L	PF	PA	Diff
1.	(Russia) CSKA Moscow	14	14	0	1191	1074	+117
2.	(Greece) Panathinaikos	14	8	6	1126	1061	+65
3.	(Italy) Benetton Treviso	14	8	6	1039	986	+53
4.	(Turkey) Ülker	14	7	7	1030	987	+43
5.	(Spain) Tau Cerámica	14	6	8	1149	1146	+3
6.	(Spain) Unicaja Málaga	14	6	8	1030	1024	+6
7.	(Germany) Opel Skyliners	14	4	10	996	1137	-141
8.	(France) Pau-Orthez	14	3	11	1070	1216	-146

== Top 16 ==
The surviving teams were divided into four groups of four teams each, and again a round robin system was adopted, resulting in 6 games each, with the two top teams advancing to the quarterfinals. Tiebreakers were identical to those used in the Regular Season.

The draw was held in accordance with Euroleague rules.

The teams were placed into four pools, as follows:

Level 1: The three group winners, plus the top-ranked second-place team

- CSKA Moscow, Climamio Bologna, Maccabi Elite Tel Aviv, Efes Pilsen

Level 2: The remaining second-place teams, plus the top two third-place teams

- FC Barcelona, Panathinaikos, Benetton Treviso, Cibona

Level 3: The remaining third-place team, plus the three fourth-place teams

- Žalgiris, Ülker, Real Madrid, AEK

Level 4: The fifth-place teams, plus the top ranked sixth-place team

- Tau Cerámica, Montepaschi Siena, Prokom Trefl Sopot, Scavolini Pesaro

Each Top 16 group included one team from each pool. The draw was conducted under the following restrictions:

1. No more than two teams from the same Regular Season group could be placed in the same Top 16 group.
2. No more than two teams from the same country could be placed in the same Top 16 group.
3. If there was a conflict between these two restrictions, (1) would receive priority.

Key to colors
Top two places in each group advanced to quarterfinals

=== Group D ===
	Team	Pld	W	L	PF	PA	Diff
1.	(Israel) Maccabi Elite Tel Aviv	6	6	0	513	427	+86
2.	(Turkey) Ülker	6	3	3	434	469	-35
3.	(Italy) Montepaschi Siena	6	2	4	470	462	+8
4.	(Croatia) Cibona VIP	6	1	5	430	489	−59

=== Group E ===
	Team	Pld	W	L	PF	PA	Diff
1.	(Russia) CSKA Moscow	6	5	1	515	450	+65
2.	(Italy) Scavolini Pesaro	6	3	3	467	492	-25
3.	(Spain) Winterthur FC Barcelona	6	2	4	463	478	−15
4.	(Spain) Real Madrid	6	2	4	477	502	−25

=== Group F ===
	Team	Pld	W	L	PF	PA	Diff
1.	(Greece) Panathinaikos	6	4	2	480	450	+30
2.	(Spain) Tau Cerámica	6	4	2	526	483	+43
3	(Italy) Climamio Bologna	6	4	2	471	479	−8
4.	(Lithuania) Žalgiris	6	0	6	457	522	−65

=== Group G ===
	Team	Pld	W	L	PF	PA	Diff
1.	(Italy) Benetton Treviso	6	4	2	447	385	+62
2.	(Turkey) Efes Pilsen	6	4	2	424	377	+47
3.	(Greece) AEK	6	4	2	436	427	+9
4.	(Poland) Prokom Trefl Sopot	6	0	6	387	505	−118

== Quarterfinals ==
Each quarterfinal was a best-of-three series between a first-place team in the Top 16 and a second-place team from a different group, with the first-place team receiving home advantage.

Team 1	Agg.	Team 2	1st leg	2nd leg	3rd leg
Maccabi Tel Aviv (Israel)	2–0	(Italy) Scavolini Pesaro	88–60	103–100	
CSKA Moscow (Russia)	2–0	(Turkey) Ülker	88–74	82–64	
Panathinaikos (Greece)	2–1	(Turkey) Efes Pilsen	102–96	63–75	84–76
Benetton Treviso (Italy)	0–2	(Spain) Tau Cerámica	59–98	64–66	

== Final four ==
Semifinals; 6 May
(Israel) Maccabi Elite	91
(Greece) Panathinaikos	82
(Russia) CSKA Moscow	78
(Spain) Tau Cerámica	85

Final; 8 May
(Israel) Maccabi Elite	90
(Spain) Tau Cerámica	78
Third place
(Russia) CSKA Moscow	91
(Greece) Panathinaikos	94

== Individual statistics ==
=== Rating ===
Rank	Name	Team	Games	Rating	PIR
1.	(United States) Anthony Parker	(Israel) Maccabi Elite Tel Aviv	24	597	24.88
2.	(United States) Tanoka Beard	(Lithuania) Žalgiris	20	439	21.95
3.	(United States) Chris Williams	(Germany) Frankfurt Skyliners	14	301	21.50

=== Points ===
Rank	Name	Team	Games	Rating	PPG
1.	(United States) Charles Smith	(Italy) Scavolini Pesaro	20	413	20.65
2.	(United States) Chris Williams	(Germany) Frankfurt Skyliners	14	265	18.93
3.	(United States) Tanoka Beard	(Lithuania) Žalgiris	20	360	18.00

=== Rebounds ===
Rank	Name	Team	Games	Rating	RPG
1.	(United States) Tanoka Beard	(Lithuania) Žalgiris	20	212	10.60
2.	(Panama) Rubén Garcés	(Spain) Adecco Estudiantes	14	121	8.64
3.	(Turkey) Hüseyin Beşok	(France) ASVEL	14	112	8.00

=== Assists ===
Rank	Name	Team	Games	Rating	APG
1.	(United States) Mire Chatman	(France) Pau-Orthez	14	87	6.21
2.	(Lithuania) Šarūnas Jasikevičius	(Israel) Maccabi Elite Tel Aviv	24	128	5.33
3.	(Greece) Nikos Zisis	(Greece) AEK	20	88	4.40

=== Other Stats ===
Category	Name	Team	Games	Stat
Steals per game	(United States) Chris Williams	(Germany) Frankfurt Skyliners	14	2.79
Blocks per game	(Lithuania) Eurelijus Žukauskas	(Turkey) Ülker	22	1.82
Turnovers per game	(United States) Mire Chatman	(France) Pau-Orthez	14	3.64
Fouls drawn per game	(Spain) Jorge Garbajosa	(Spain) Unicaja Málaga	13	6.54
Minutes per game	(Germany) Pascal Roller	(Germany) Frankfurt Skyliners	14	36:38
2FG%	(Spain) Fran Vázquez	(Spain) Unicaja Málaga	14	0.701
3FG%	(United States) Antonio Granger	(Russia) CSKA Moscow	23	0.483
FT%	(Serbia) Uroš Tripković	(Serbia) Partizan	14	0.968

== Awards ==
=== Euroleague MVP ===
- (United States) Anthony Parker ( (Israel) Maccabi Elite Tel Aviv)

=== Final Four MVP ===
- (Lithuania) Šarūnas Jasikevičius ( (Israel) Maccabi Elite Tel Aviv)

=== Finals Top Scorer ===
- (Lithuania) Šarūnas Jasikevičius ( (Israel) Maccabi Elite Tel Aviv)

=== All-Euroleague First Team ===
- (Lithuania) Šarūnas Jasikevičius ( (Israel) Maccabi Elite Tel Aviv)
- (Lithuania) Arvydas Macijauskas ( (Spain) Tau Cerámica)
- (United States) Anthony Parker ( (Israel) Maccabi Elite Tel Aviv)
- (Australia) David Andersen ( (Russia) CSKA Moscow)
- (Croatia) Nikola Vujčić ( (Israel) Maccabi Elite Tel Aviv)

=== All-Euroleague Second Team ===
- (Slovenia) Jaka Lakovič ( (Greece) Panathinaikos)
- (United States) Marcus Brown ( (Russia) CSKA Moscow)
- (United States) Charles Smith ( (Italy) Scavolini Pesaro)
- (Argentina) Luis Scola ( (Spain) Tau Cerámica)
- (United States) Tanoka Beard ( (Lithuania) Žalgiris)

=== Rising Star ===
- (Slovenia) Erazem Lorbek ( (Italy) Climamio Bologna)

=== Best Defender ===
- (Greece) Dimitris Diamantidis ( (Greece) Panathinaikos)

=== Alphonso Ford Top Scorer ===
- (United States) Charles Smith ( (Italy) Scavolini Pesaro)

=== Alexander Gomelsky Coach of the Year ===
- (Israel) Pini Gershon ( (Israel) Maccabi Elite Tel Aviv)

=== Club Executive of the Year ===
- (Spain) Jose Antonio Querejeta ( (Spain) Tau Cerámica)

== References and notes ==
Euroleague Competition Format
