= Šarūnas Jasikevičius =

Lithuanian basketball player and coach

- Jasikevičius with Fenerbahçe in 2026

Fenerbahçe Tarfin
- Title: Head coach
- League: BSL; EuroLeague

Personal information
- Born: 5 March 1976 (age 50) Kaunas, Lithuania
- Listed height: 1.94 m (6 ft 4 in)
- Listed weight: 202 lb (92 kg)

Career information
- High school: Solanco (Quarryville, Pennsylvania)
- College: Maryland (1994–1998)
- NBA draft: 1998: undrafted
- Playing career: 1998–2014
- Position: Point guard
- Number: 3, 13, 19, 22, 33
- Coaching career: 2014–present

Career history

Playing
- 1998–1999: Lietuvos rytas
- 1999–2000: Union Olimpija
- 2000–2003: FC Barcelona
- 2003–2005: Maccabi Tel Aviv
- 2005–2007: Indiana Pacers
- 2007: Golden State Warriors
- 2007–2010: Panathinaikos
- 2010–2011: Lietuvos rytas
- 2011: Fenerbahçe
- 2011–2012: Panathinaikos
- 2012–2013: FC Barcelona
- 2013–2014: Žalgiris

Career highlights
- As player: EuroBasket MVP (2003); 4× EuroLeague champion (2003–2005, 2009); 2× All-EuroLeague First Team (2004, 2005); EuroLeague Final Four MVP (2005); EuroLeague 25th Anniversary Team (2025); EuroLeague Legend (2015); 50 Greatest EuroLeague Contributors (2008); EuroLeague 2000–2010 All-Decade Team (2010); Mr. Europa Player of the Year (2003); 2× EuroLeague 50–40–90 club (2004, 2008); 4× EuroLeague Free Throw Percentage leader (2003, 2005, 2008, 2014); 2× Liga ACB champion (2001, 2003); Liga ACB Finals MVP (2003); 3× Spanish Cup champion (2001, 2003, 2013); 2× Liga ACB All-Star (2001, 2003); 3× Greek League champion (2008–2010); 3× Greek Cup winner (2008, 2009, 2012); All-Greek League Team (2009); Greek Cup Finals MVP (2012); 2× Greek All-Star (2008, 2009); Greek League Guard of the Year (2008); Turkish League champion (2011); Turkish Cup winner (2011); 2× Israeli Super League champion (2004, 2005); 2× Israeli State Cup winner (2004, 2005); Israeli Super League MVP (2005); 2× Israeli Super League Quintet (2004, 2005); Lithuanian LKL champion (2014); Lithuanian Sportsman of the Year (2003); Slovenian League MVP (2000); Slovenian League All-Star (2000); Slovenian Cup winner (2000); Slovenian Cup MVP (2000); As head coach: EuroLeague champion (2025); EuroLeague Coach of the Year (2025); 3× Turkish League champion (2024–2026); Turkish League Coach of the Year (2025); 3× Turkish Cup winner (2024–2026); 2× Turkish Super Cup winner (2025, 2026); 2× Liga ACB champion (2021, 2023); 2× Spanish Cup winner (2021, 2022); 5× LKL champion (2016–2020); 3× Lithuanian King Mindaugas Cup winner (2017, 2018, 2020); 3× LKL Coach of the Year (2017–2019); As assistant coach: Lithuanian League champion (2015); Lithuanian Cup winner (2015)
- Stats at NBA.com
- Stats at Basketball Reference
Medals
Men's basketball
Representing Lithuania
Summer Olympics
| Bronze medal – third place | 2000 Sydney |
EuroBasket
| Gold medal – first place | 2003 Sweden |
| Bronze medal – third place | 2007 Spain |
FIBA Europe U20 Championship
| Gold medal – first place | 1996 Turkey | Under-20 |
FIBA Europe U18 Championship
| Gold medal – first place | 1994 Israel | Under-18 |

Šarūnas "Šaras" Jasikevičius ([ʃɐˈrûːnɐs jɛsʲɪˈkʲæːvʲɪtɕʊs]; born 5 March 1976) is a Lithuanian professional basketball coach and former player who is the head coach for Fenerbahçe of the Turkish Basketbol Süper Ligi and the EuroLeague. During his playing career, standing at a height of 6 ft 4 in (1.93 m) tall, he played at the point guard position.

Often considered one of the best Lithuanian and European point guards ever, Jasikevičius was a two-time All-EuroLeague First Team selection, the EuroLeague Final Four MVP in 2005 and a four-time triple crown winner. He was named the 2005 Israeli Basketball Premier League MVP. Moreover, he was the first player in EuroLeague history to win the competition with three clubs. A former representative of the senior Lithuanian men's national team, he won the gold medal at 2003 EuroBasket, earning an All-EuroBasket Team selection and MVP honors in the process. He also won the bronze medal at the 2000 Summer Olympic Games, and the bronze medal at 2007 EuroBasket.

In 2015, Jasikevičius was named a EuroLeague Basketball Legend as a reward for his playing career and was honored with a ceremony.

He has won both Liga ACB and Spanish Cup with Barcelona as both a coach and player, as well as both Turkish Basketball League and Turkish Cup with Fenerbahçe in same capacities. He also won the Euroleague title as Fenerbahçe coach in 2025. Additionally, he achieved victory in the Lithuanian League with Žalgiris, also as both coach and player.

== Early years ==
Jasikevičius was born into a family of athletes. His mother Rita, a famous Lithuanian handball player, won a silver medal with the Soviet Union women's national handball team during the 1975 World Women's Handball Championship. Following the success in the world championship, Rita was preparing for the 1976 Summer Olympics in Montreal. According to Rita: "Everything was calculated, planned: Olympic Games, then - the increase of family, one year break and then back to sports again. But everything happened differently" and she had to choose between her son and the Olympic Games. She decided to give birth to a child and give up the Olympic dream. Later on, the Soviet squad went on to win the Olympic gold medals in the Montreal Olympics and the national team's head coach shut the door for Rita Jasikevičienė to return into the national team in the future. However, Šarūnas's mother never regretted her decision. Šarūnas remembers that his mother constantly said: "My son will give me back the Olympics".

"One day, for example, (my dad) told me that up until a short time ago Lithuania had been an independent country - you could have blown me down with a feather. We weren't allowed to study these things, let alone talk about them. People were afraid to talk; almost everyone was a member of the Communist Party. If you didn't join you were putting yourself in a bad situation, you risked never finding a job and you would be cut off from social life, at all levels. What could we possibly know of what was happening outside that context? We knew nothing, except that the Americans were the bad ones. We could not see their movies, except clandestinely, and only thanks to the advent of VCRs. (...) Nothing from Spain or Italy or anywhere else."

— Šarūnas Jasikevičius, describing his childhood.

In his childhood Šarūnas was a very agile child. His mother remembers that soon after learning to walk, Šarūnas immediately began to run leaning at 45 degrees. Rita: "He was running and running everywhere and I had to constantly chase him". The biggest penalty for Šarūnas was to sit. His younger brother Vytenis was slightly different though. He was slower, but both brothers were unable to live without a ball as kids.

Jasikevičius's father Linas always was a sports lover and his son followed his lead to cheer for practically anything. Together they cheered for the USSR national teams or any athlete who had USSR written across his or her chest. Not surprisingly, his dad took him to his first basketball workout when he was 6 years old. His first coach was Feliksas Mitkevičius in Kaunas basketball school, who was strict and never chased Šarūnas when he tried to run away from workouts and also coached Žydrūnas Ilgauskas and Tomas Masiulis. According to Mitkevičius, when Šarūnas was 12 years old, he was so sick of basketball that he wished to drop it. He visited his parents, outlined the situation and stated that it would be a huge loss to Lithuania. Following it, his dad had some strong words for Šarūnas and forbade him to drop basketball, which he wished to replace with tennis. In Kaunas basketball school he met with future NBA star Žydrūnas Ilgauskas with whom he was meeting practically every day, at school, in the gym or elsewhere for the next eleven years. Tomas Masiulis was another notable player on his team. Jasikevičius remembers that at first he was seen as the guy who was "talented but lazy" as he was not a committed athlete; all he did was joke around and try to work as little as possible. Consequently, on one occasions, his dad stopped him from going on a trip to Minsk with the team, a trip of the sort that only happens once a year, as his marks were disastrous and it was a punishment: "No school? So no basketball". However, his parents were happy to see him pouring his hyperactivity into basketball, and this made them urge him on towards the sport, as it also helped him avoid bad company. They played in the gym, and also in the street using scrap metal instead of real baskets, and their favorite pastime was called minus, a kind of forerunner of the game that can be seen today during the NBA All-Star Game called "horse". It was far from ideal, but his parents preferred to see him play with the scrap metal hoops in front of their home than down at the pitch, where it would have taken him less than five minutes to pick a fight with the wrong person. His childhood dream was to become a Žalgiris player, a team of which he was such a fan that he knew everything about every player, even the players' shoe sizes. Following the Žalgiris' victory in 1986 Intercontinental Cup, he begged his father to take him to the airport to welcome home the players, where hundreds of people were waiting in the freezing cold. His father knew some of the players, and managed to get signed posters and photos that he used to decorate all the walls of his room.

"I was thirteen years old when I went to Spain for the first time. Flying to Madrid was like going to the moon, and it was also the first time I ventured into some kind of international competition. We went with ten players, the bare minimum. The reason is easy to understand; there was little money. But everyone wanted to take part in the expedition. (...) My father got us the sport uniforms, featuring the acronym K.S.M., Kaunas Sporto Mokykla or Sports School of Kaunas. So how could they refuse to take with them the son of the guy who had given them their official uniforms officers? Obviously, they didn't refuse."

— Šarūnas Jasikevičius, about his first trip to Spain.

Šarūnas started going to school at Jonas Jablonskis Middle School in 1982 and attended it until 1987. He had to take the bus to go to school even though the thermometer outside read minus twenty and he knew that the most important thing for his parents was that he spent as little time as possible with the bad kids on Partizanai Street. From 1987 to 1993, he studied at Kaunas 4th Middle School. On his first class trip, he went to Moscow, which he visited before the tournament. Jasikevičius's greatest youth memory in the city was the opening of the first McDonald's in Russia. He remembers that his classmates were listening with their mouths gaped open when he was telling them about the French fries, bread rolls with minced beef and fizzy drinks. One of his childhood passions was history, especially about the Native Americans, as well as books about basketball as he was capable of reading a book of more than four hundred pages on basketball in two days. He was also curious about politics, especially when Perestroika began, because of which he was able to travel to Berlin with his father and brother, and was amazed by the visit to the Checkpoint Charlie Museum. His childhood favorite Lithuanian player was Arvydas Sabonis, whom he admired more than any other Lithuanian superstars, like Rimas Kurtinaitis and Valdemaras Chomičius, because of Sabonis' elite passing. However, his idol was Dražen Petrović, and he wished to be as good as him, watching his matches again and again, dozens of times, for hours and hours, and later started imitating him in workouts. After one of his trips, his dad came back with a videocassette recorder, using which he was able to record an NBA All-Star Game with Michael Jordan, Clyde Drexler, Larry Bird, Magic Johnson, and David Robinson, and was later to watch it for a couple of years, more than a hundred times. Jasikevičius also started to record games of Žalgiris and Petrović every time he was able to. Thanks to the video recorder, he discovered the existence of the no-look pass of Magic Johnson. For him, he was the NBA, not Michael Jordan. His unselfishness, imagination, the way he dribbled, and how he passed between his opponent's legs bewitched Jasikevičius. Consequently, his favorite element of basketball quickly became assisting his teammates, which he tried to do like Petrović or Johnson.

Later he continued his studies in the United States. In 1993–94 he attended Solanco High School in Quarryville, Pennsylvania. That year his team won 25 of 27 games and was one of the contenders for the State Championship final, however they lost their first playoff game and finished the season early. However, he was noticed by Billy Hahn, who was working as University of Maryland assistant coach and who invited Jasikevičius to join them.

== College career ==
Jasikevičius played NCAA Division I college basketball at the University of Maryland, with the Maryland Terrapins. He played as a wing, although he remade himself into a point guard in his pro career. He did not see much playing time in his first two years in college, with seniors Duane Simpkins, Johnny Rhodes, and Exree Hipp ahead of him at the wing positions. As a junior, he became a better passer and improved his defense. He averaged a shade under 13 points and 4 assists in his junior and senior years.

== Professional career ==
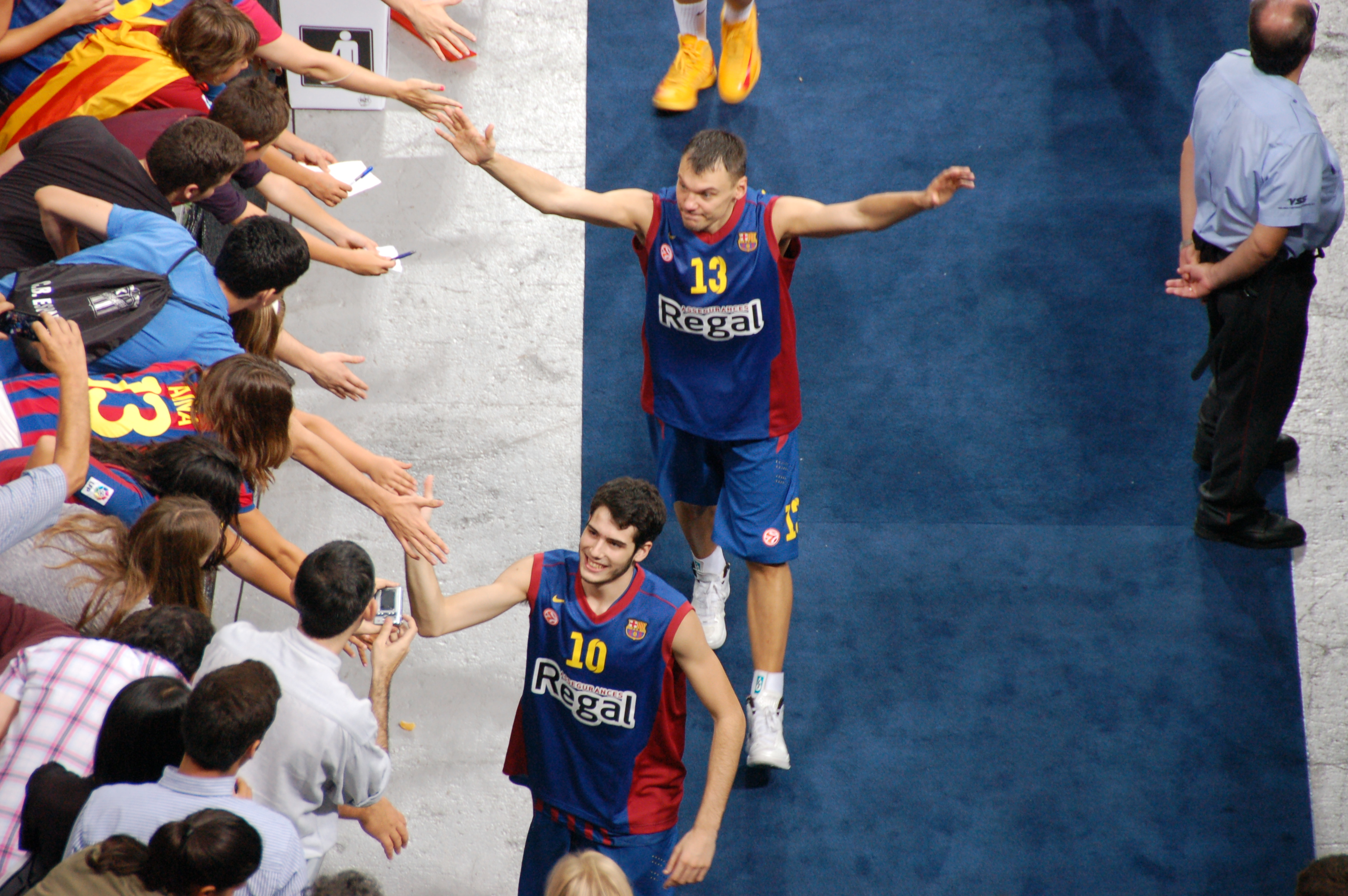
Jasikevičius with his first EuroLeague-winning team Barcelona

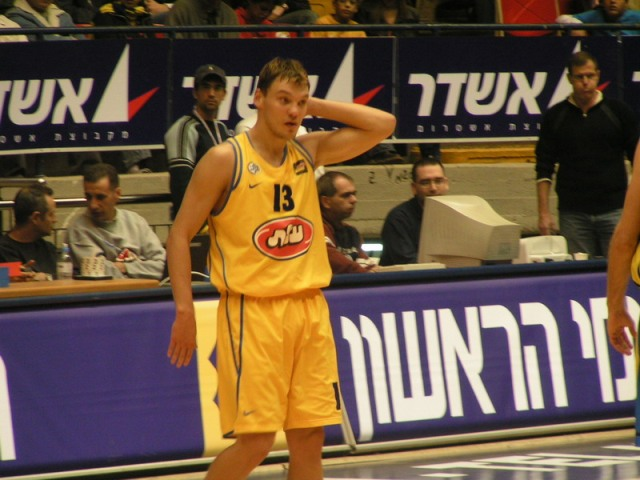
Jasikevičius with Maccabi Tel Aviv in 2004

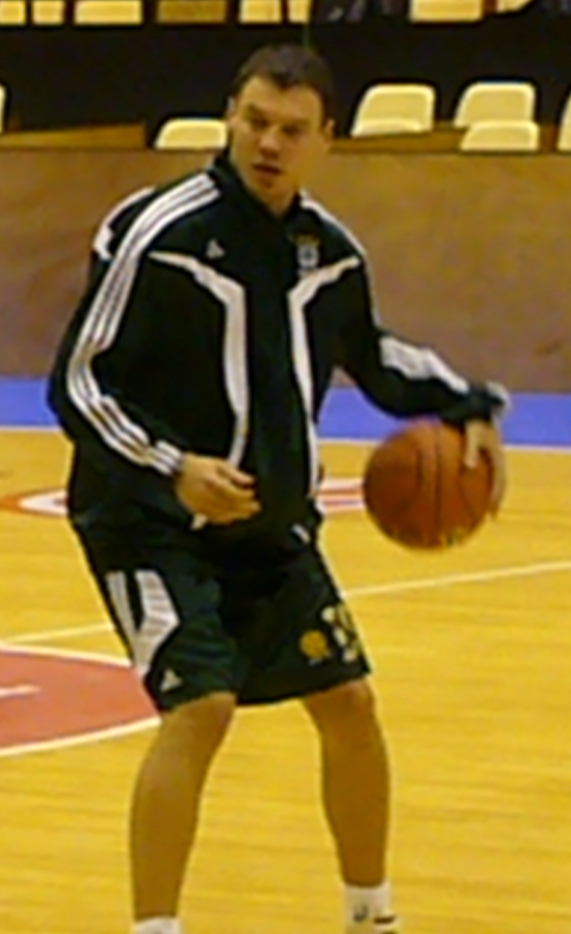
Jasikevičius as a Panathinaikos player

=== Early career ===
Jasikevičius made his pro debut in the 1998–99 season, with the Lithuanian club Lietuvos rytas, of Vilnius. With Rytas, he averaged 18.0 points and 5.4 assists per game. In the following 1999–2000 season, Jasikevičius joined the Slovenian club Union Olimpija. With Union Olimpija, he won the Slovenian Cup. With Union Olimpija, he averaged 9.3 points and 3.4 assists per game.

=== Barcelona Bàsquet ===
Jasikevičius played the next three seasons with FC Barcelona, and won the EuroLeague with them in 2003. He started for the championship team, and averaged 13.4 points and 3.2 assists per game. He also led the team to two Spanish League titles, and two Spanish King's Cups.

=== Maccabi Tel Aviv ===
Jasikevičius joined Maccabi Tel Aviv in 2003, and helped them win two EuroLeague titles, two Israeli League crowns, and two Israeli Cups. He was named the 2005 Israeli Basketball Premier League MVP.

=== NBA ===
Jasikevičius signed with the Indiana Pacers in July 2005. The deal was worth $12 million over three years. He played in the NBA with the Pacers in 112 regular season games (16 starts), over one and a half seasons, averaging 7.3 points and 3.0 assists per game.

On 17 January 2007, Jasikevičius was traded to the Golden State Warriors, along with Stephen Jackson, Al Harrington, and Josh Powell, in exchange for Troy Murphy, Mike Dunleavy Jr., Ike Diogu, and Keith McLeod. He did not become a part of the rotation in Golden State. He averaged 4.3 points and 2.3 assists per game, in 26 games (2 starts) played, in only 11.9 minutes per game. Jasikevičius was bought out by the Warriors on 20 September 2007.

=== Panathinaikos Athens ===
On 25 September 2007, Jasikevičius signed with Panathinaikos. The deal reportedly was worth €7 million euros net income over two years (7.7 million including his buyout). With Panathinaikos, he won the EuroLeague again in 2009. Jasikevičius became the only player in basketball history to win the EuroLeague with three different teams. He also won three Greek League titles and three Greek Cups with Panathinaikos. In 2009, he signed a contract extension worth € 3.5 million euros net income with Panathinaikos. He underwent a knee surgery that same year, and after 5 months of rehabilitation, he returned to the court with limited playing time.

=== Return to Rytas Vilnius ===
In November 2010, Jasikevičius signed a one-year contract with Lietuvos rytas of the Lithuanian Basketball League.

=== Fenerbahçe Istanbul ===
In January 2011, Fenerbahçe, bought-out Jasikevičius' contract with Lietuvos Rytas, and he signed a one-year contract with them.

=== Return to Panathinaikos Athens ===
In September 2011, Jasikevičius signed a new contract with Panathinaikos. At age 36, he was named the Greek Cup Final MVP, as he helped Panathinaikos to victory against Olympiacos, in a game that finished with a score of 71–70.

=== Return to FC Barcelona Bàsquet ===
Despite rumors that Jasikevičius would join Žalgiris, in July 2012, Jasikevičius signed with his former team, FC Barcelona Bàsquet. During the fifth Spanish Liga ACB finals game against Real Madrid, Jasikevičius scored 23 points, and dished out 2 assists, in 19 minutes of game action. However, it wasn't enough, as Real won the game 79 to 71.

On 1 July 2013, it was announced that Barcelona had parted ways with Jasikevičius.

=== Žalgiris ===
In September 2013, Jasikevičius returned home to Kaunas, signing with Žalgiris. On 30 September 2013, he debuted with Žalgiris, during a game against Unics Kazan, scoring 6 points and dishing out 4 assists. He retired after the season, and joined the Žalgiris coaching staff.

== National team career ==
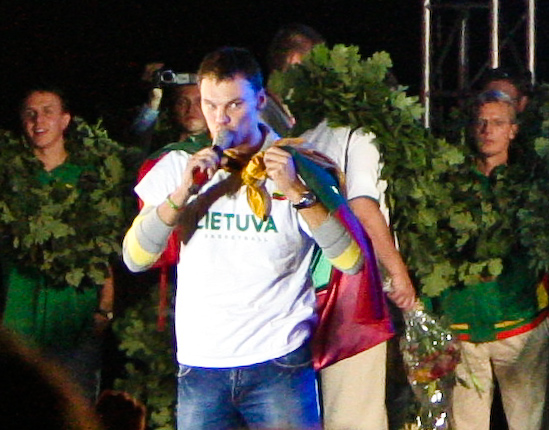
Šarūnas Jasikevičius, during the bronze medalists meeting, in 2007 in Vilnius.

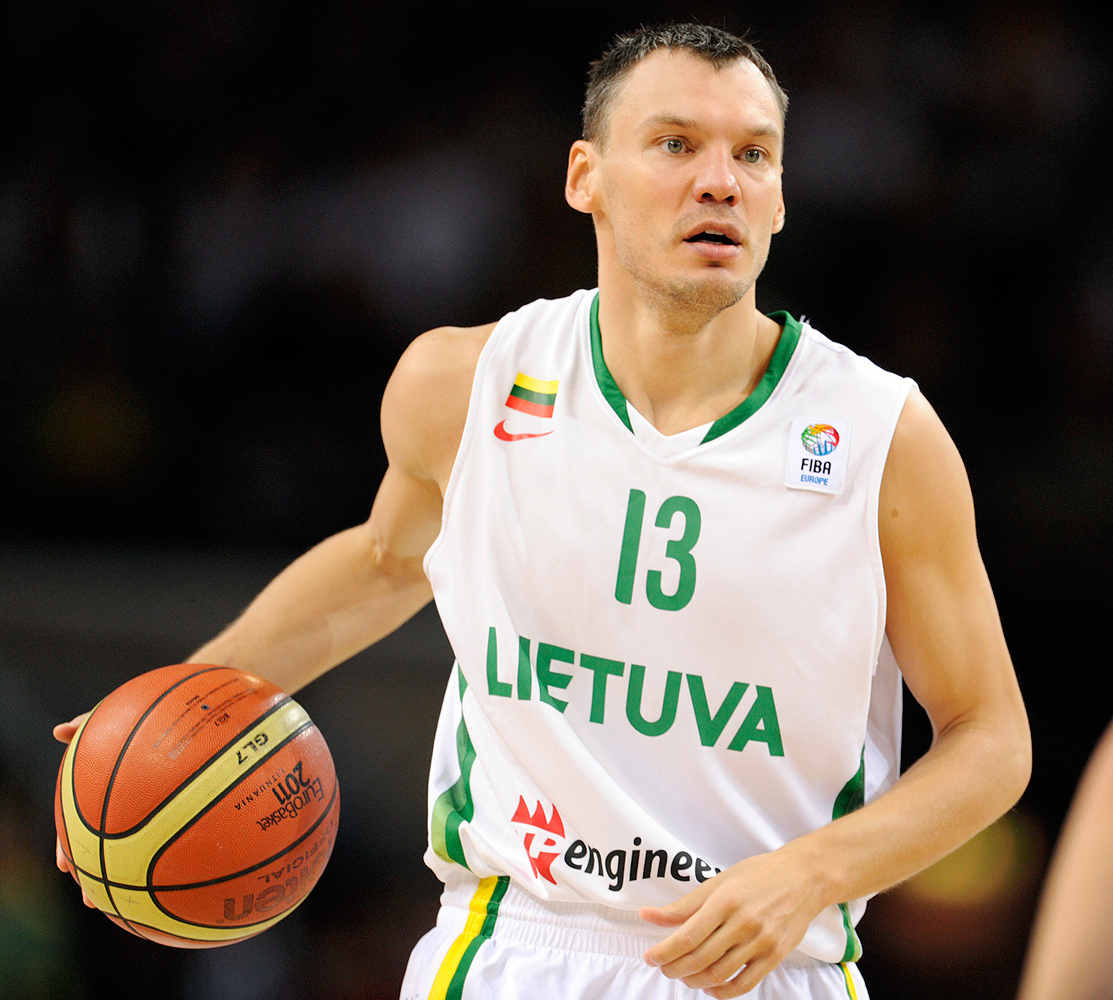
Šarunas Jasikevičius, during EuroBasket 2011

=== Lithuanian junior national team ===
Jasikevičius was a member of the junior national teams of Lithuania. With Lithuania's junior national teams, he won the gold medal at the 1994 FIBA Europe Under-18 Championship, and the gold medal at the 1996 FIBA Europe Under-20 Championship.

=== Lithuanian senior national team ===
Jasikevičius started his senior national team career in 1997, when he played for Lithuania's senior national team at the EuroBasket 1997. Jasikevičius was also a member of the senior Lithuanian national team that won the bronze medal at the 2000 Summer Olympics. He averaged 14.0 points and 5.1 assists, and scored a tournament-high 27 points, in a semifinals loss to the United States.

Jasikevičius also led Lithuania to the EuroBasket 2003 gold medal. He was named the tournament's MVP, after averaging 14.0 points and 8.2 assists per game.

Jasikevičius also helped Lithuania win the bronze medal at the EuroBasket 2007. He averaged 10.4 points and 5.6 assists per game, and scored a tournament-high 18 points against Turkey, on 3 September 2007.

As of 2012, he was the only Lithuanian basketball player to participate in the Summer Olympics four times in a row. He retired from the Lithuanian national team following the 2012 Summer Olympics. Over his entire career as a senior Lithuania national basketball team member, he averaged 10 points, 2.3 rebounds, and 4.9 assists per game. He was named to the FIBA EuroBasket 2000–2020 Dream Team in 2020.

== Coaching career ==
=== Žalgiris (2014–2020) ===
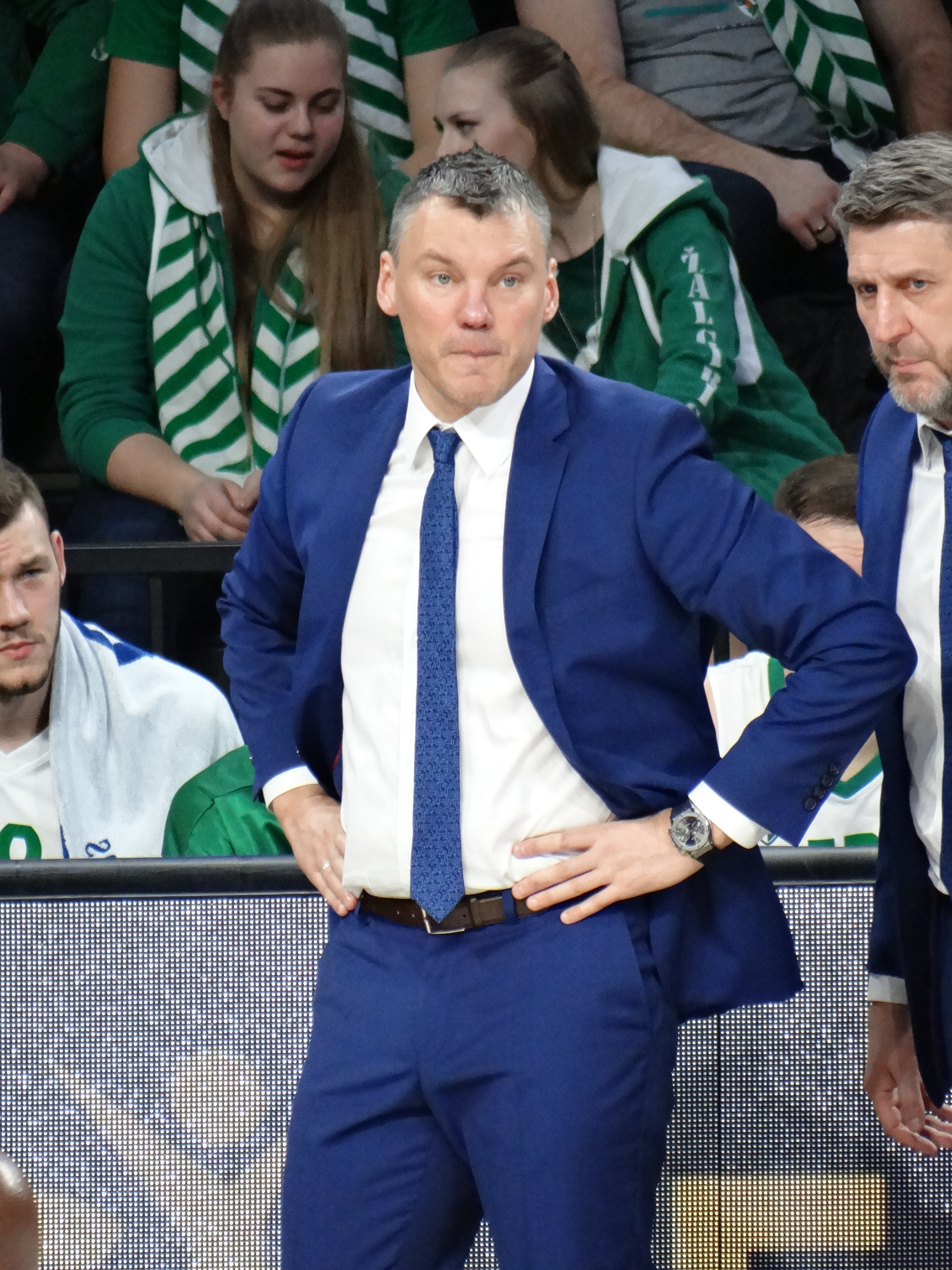
Jasikevičius coaching BC Žalgiris in 2018

On 29 July 2014, Jasikevičius announced his retirement from playing basketball, and was appointed to an assistant coach position with Žalgiris. After the firing of head coach Gintaras Krapikas during the 2015–16 season, Jasikevičius became the team's interim head coach. On 13 January 2016, it was announced that he was appointed their new head coach.

Over the next few years, Jasikevičius took over an underachieving team that almost always failed on the bigger stage, and turned it into a EuroLeague playoff contender. On 22 January 2016, he got his first EuroLeague victory as a head coach, when Žalgiris shockingly crushed the previous season's runners-up, Olympiacos, by a score of 75–55, at Žalgiris Arena. On 26 October 2016, just before the first game versus his former long-time head coach Željko Obradović, Željko said: "I knew that he will be a good coach and in the future - one of the best in Europe". On 13 June 2017, he was named best coach of the 2016–17 LKL season. After the season, San Antonio Spurs and U.S. national team head coach Gregg Popovich invited him to join his coaching staff during the 2017 NBA Summer League. However, Jasikevičius declined, due to previous summer commitments. Jasikevičius also took third place in voting for the 2017 Alexander Gomelsky EuroLeague Coach of the Year award, as Žalgiris finished with a 14-16 record, two games away from the EuroLeague playoffs, while projected to finish last.

During the 2017–18 EuroLeague season, Jasikevičius and his Žalgiris beat expectations by ending in sixth place in the regular season, with an 18-12 record. On 26 April 2018, Žalgiris qualified for the 2018 EuroLeague Final Four by beating Olympiacos in game 4 to clinch a 3–1 series win. It was achieved by having a second lowest budget in the whole league. During the semi-final, Žalgiris played Fenerbahçe, unfortunately losing 76–67. Two days later they faced CSKA Moscow in the bronze medal game, winning that game 77–79 and finishing third for the season. On 20 June 2018, he was named best coach of the 2017–18 LKL season after coaching Žalgiris to yet another Lithuanian League title. On 27 June, Jasikevičius signed one-season contract with Žalgiris. In the 2018-19 season, Žalgiris once again made the EuroLeague playoffs, with a 15-15 record - giving a tough fight against Fenerbahçe, who won the series 3-1. He was named as a LKL Coach of the Year for the third straight time in 2019, with Žalgiris easily winning the LKL championship.

According to Euroleague statistics, Jasikevičius team's defensive rating was 97,0 during the 2019/20 season. Jasikevičius team's offensive rating was 100,7. The tight offensive system by Jasikevičius led to only 15,6 turnovers per game in his last season. Under Šarūnas Jasikevičius, Žalgiris was the third slowest team with 80 possessions per game. This can be explained by mentioning the depth of Jasikevičius playbook, which had more than 40 different plays prepared. Jasikevičius finished his last year with Žalgiris with another LKL championship, along with the King Mindaugas Cup title - Žalgiris also in playoff contention in the EuroLeague, before the season was stopped by the COVID-19 pandemic.

=== Barcelona (2020–2023) ===
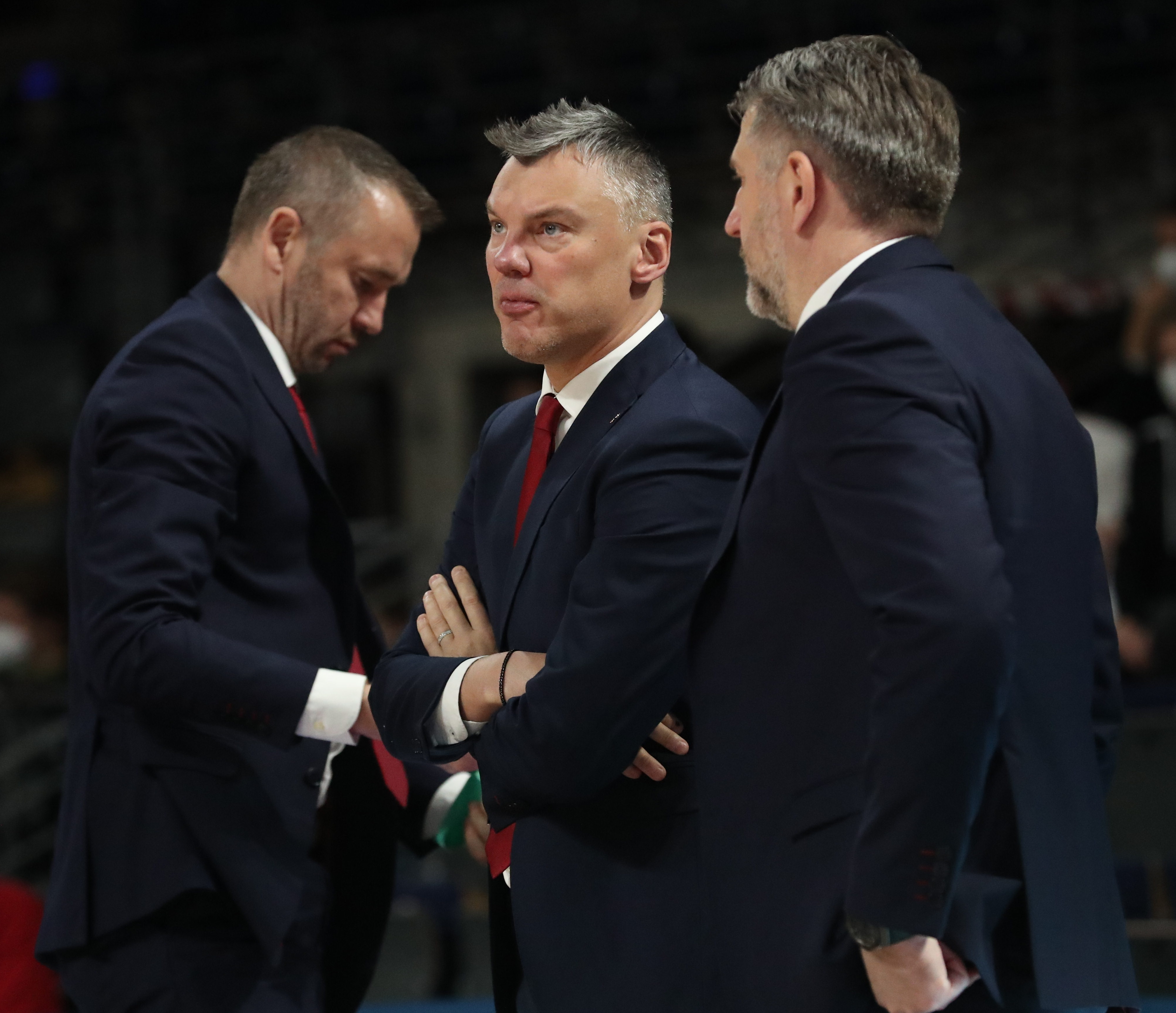
Jasikevičius with his assistants Darius Maskoliūnas and Tomas Masiulis coaching FC Barcelona

On 2 July 2020, he signed a two-year contract with FC Barcelona. During his first season as a head coach of FC Barcelona, the club won the 2020–21 EuroLeague Regular Season.

On 26 June 2023, in a surprising move, Jasikevičius parted ways with the Catalan powerhouse after three seasons, despite having won the 2023 Liga ACB championship a few days before. He won two Spanish League (2021, 2023), two Spanish Cup (2021, 2022) and two Catalan League (2022, 2023) with the team, and joined three times to EuroLeague Final Four (2021, 2022, 2023).

After Jasikevičius departure the FC Barcelona Bàsquet did not win any trophies in the next three seasons, which is the worst streak for the FC Barcelona Bàsquet in 49 years (since 1976–1977 season).

=== Fenerbahçe (2023–present) ===
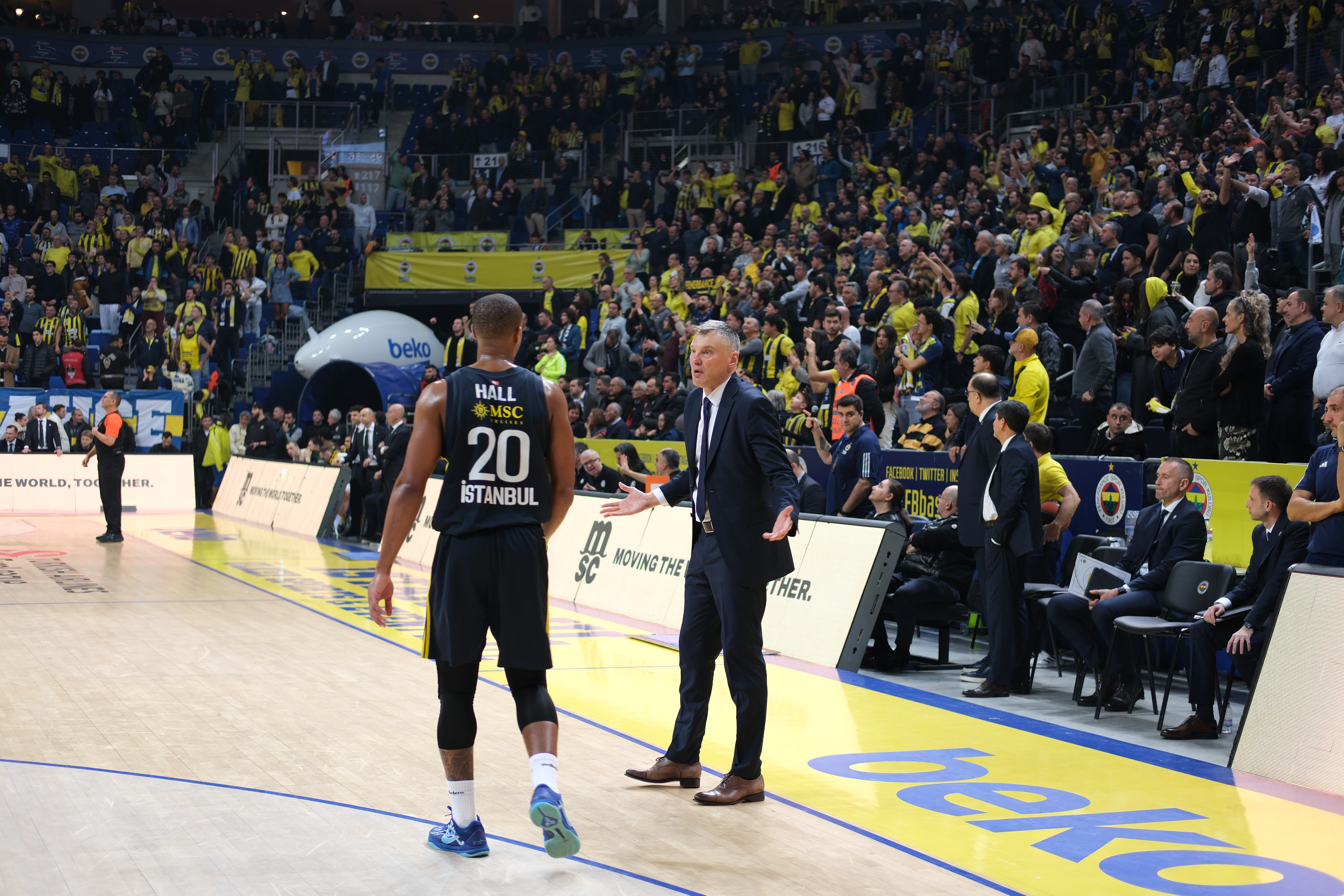
Jasikevičius giving instructions to Devon Hall while coaching Fenerbahçe in the 2024–25 season during which Fenerbahçe won all three trophies it has competed for.

Jasikevičius with Fenerbahçe after winning the 2026 Turkish Basketball Presidential Cup

On 14 December 2023, Jasikevičius was announced as Fenerbahçe head coach on a three-year deal. He made 15 won and 7 lost in his first season with the team in EuroLeague Basketball, finished sixth place in 2023–24 EuroLeague regular season, beat Monaco in play-offs, helped the team after 4 seasons to join 2024 EuroLeague Final Four. In his first Basketbol Süper Ligi season as a coach with the team, he won the championship against Anadolu Efes in 2023–24 season.

In his second season with the team, he won 23 games in 34 and finished second place in 2024–25 EuroLeague regular season then won EuroLeague Coach of the Year award. In play-offs, they sweep Paris Basketball and join 2025 EuroLeague Final Four. On May 25, 2025, Jasikevičius managed Fenerbahçe to their second EuroLeague championship in Abu Dhabi, defeat the defending champions Panathinaikos in the semi-final, and Monaco in the final. He defended champion Basketbol Süper Ligi as a coach with the team, he won the championship against Beşiktaş Fibabanka in 2024–25 season. This way he achieved his first European Basketball Triple Crown as a head coach. Jasikevičius was also named the Turkish Basketball Super League Coach of the Year this season.

On 24 September 2025, Fenerbahçe, coached by Jasikevičius, won the 2025 Turkish Basketball Presidential Cup, completing a quadruple crown by winning all four major competitions contested in 2025.

Following Nando de Colo's return in early January 2026, Fenerbahçe executive Cem Ciritci responded to a fan's question regarding Jasikevičius' contract extension on social media by replying "tranquilo". On 13 January 2026, Fenerbahçe announced that he signed a three-year contract extension with the club. On 22 February 2026, Fenerbahçe won the Turkish Basketball Cup. In the 2026 EuroLeague Playoffs the Fenerbahçe eliminated 1–3 his hometown team Žalgiris Kaunas and qualified to the 2026 EuroLeague Final Four where the Fenerbahçe was eliminated in the semi-final by the eventual champions Olympiacos B.C. In the 2026 Turkish League final series the Fenerbahçe won 3–1 versus the Beşiktaş J.K., while Jasikevičius became only the second head coach in the history of Fenerbahçe to win three straight Turkish League titles (the other head coach Željko Obradović, 2016–2018).

In the start of the 2026–2027 season Fenerbahçe won the 2026 Turkish Basketball Presidential Cup.

== Career statistics ==
Legend
| GP | Games played | GS | Games started | MPG | Minutes per game |
| FG% | Field-goal percentage | 3P% | 3-point field-goal percentage | FT% | Free-throw percentage |
| RPG | Rebounds per game | APG | Assists per game | SPG | Steals per game |
| BPG | Blocks per game | PPG | Points per game | PIR | Performance index rating |
| **Bold** | Career high |

=== NBA ===
==== Regular season ====
| Year | Team | GP | GS | MPG | FG% | 3P% | FT% | RPG | APG | SPG | BPG | PPG |
|---|---|---|---|---|---|---|---|---|---|---|---|---|
| 2005–06 | Indiana | **75** | **15** | **20.8** | .396 | .364 | .910 | **2.0** | **3.0** | **.5** | **.1** | 7.3 |
| 2006–07 | Indiana | 37 | 1 | 17.9 | **.412** | **.372** | **.922** | 1.3 | **3.0** | .4 | .0 | **7.4** |
| 2006–07 | Golden State | 26 | 2 | 11.9 | .366 | .273 | .871 | .8 | 2.3 | **.5** | .0 | 4.3 |
| Career | | 138 | 18 | 18.3 | .397 | .355 | .908 | 1.6 | 2.9 | .5 | .0 | 6.8 |

==== Playoffs ====
| Year | Team | GP | GS | MPG | FG% | 3P% | FT% | RPG | APG | SPG | BPG | PPG |
|---|---|---|---|---|---|---|---|---|---|---|---|---|
| 2006 | Indiana | **6** | 0 | **11.0** | **.368** | **.222** | **.500** | **1.0** | **1.0** | .0 | **.2** | **2.8** |
| 2007 | Golden State | 4 | 0 | 1.5 | .000 | — | **.500** | .0 | .5 | .0 | .0 | .3 |
| Career | | 10 | 0 | 7.2 | .350 | .222 | .500 | .6 | .8 | .0 | .1 | 1.8 |

=== EuroLeague ===
| † | Denotes season in which Jasikevičius won the EuroLeague |
| * | Led the league |

| Year | Team | GP | GS | MPG | FG% | 3P% | FT% | RPG | APG | SPG | BPG | PPG | PIR |
|---|---|---|---|---|---|---|---|---|---|---|---|---|---|
| 1999–00 | Olimpija | 22 | 22 | **33.2** | .490 | **.491** | .759 | **2.9** | 4.9 | **1.5** | .0 | 13.6 | — |
| 2000–01 | Barcelona | 9 | 8 | 28.2 | .398 | .327 | .900 | 2.3 | **5.6** | 1.0 | **.1** | 14.0 | 14.1 |
| 2001–02 | Barcelona | 18 | 16 | 23.5 | .504 | .449 | .872 | 2.1 | 3.4 | .9 | **.1** | 11.6 | 10.2 |
| 2002–03† | Barcelona | 21 | 15 | 26.4 | .423 | .378 | .959* | 1.8 | 3.2 | .7 | .0 | 13.4 | 10.8 |
| 2003–04† | Maccabi | 21 | 20 | 29.7 | .477 | .448 | .925 | 1.6 | 4.8 | .7 | .0 | **16.0** | 16.3 |
| 2004–05† | Maccabi | 24 | **23** | 31.7 | .431 | .399 | .941 | 2.7 | 5.3 | .9 | **.1** | 15.7 | **16.6** |
| 2007–08 | Panathinaikos | 20 | 5 | 23.5 | .485 | .408 | .938* | 1.6 | 2.9 | .7 | .0 | 13.2 | 12.9 |
| 2008–09† | Panathinaikos | 22 | 4 | 20.1 | .450 | .389 | .886 | 1.5 | 3.0 | .6 | **.1** | 9.6 | 8.1 |
| 2009–10 | Panathinaikos | 7 | 0 | 15.8 | .400 | .000 | .700 | 1.1 | 2.1 | .3 | .0 | 4.4 | 2.6 |
| 2010–11 | Rytas | 6 | 0 | 19.4 | .437 | .375 | .909 | 1.3 | 4.3 | .2 | .0 | 7.3 | 7.0 |
| 2010–11 | Fenerbahçe | 6 | 1 | 15.4 | .407 | .375 | .800 | 1.0 | 1.5 | .2 | .0 | 4.8 | 1.5 |
| 2011–12 | Panathinaikos | 21 | 1 | 15.4 | **.517** | .385 | .875 | 1.3 | 2.5 | .6 | .0 | 7.2 | 6.3 |
| 2012–13 | Barcelona | **31*** | 3 | 14.6 | .450 | .340 | .933 | .8 | 2.0 | .3 | **.1** | 4.9 | 4.4 |
| 2013–14 | Žalgiris | 20 | 1 | 16.8 | .409 | .404 | **1.000** | 1.1 | 3.1 | .4 | **.1** | 6.7 | 5.3 |
| Career | | 226 | 97 | 22.0 | .453 | .394 | .927 | 1.6 | 3.4 | .6 | .0 | 10.4 | 9.6 |

== Coaching record ==
Legend
| G | Games coached | W | Games won | L | Games lost | W–L % | Win-loss % |

Note: The EuroLeague is not the only competition in which the team played during the season. He also coached in domestic competition, and regional competition if applicable.

=== EuroLeague ===
| Team | Year | G | W | L | W–L% | Result |
|---|---|---|---|---|---|---|
| Žalgiris | 2015–16 | 12 | 2 | 10 | .167 | Eliminated in Top 16 stage |
| Žalgiris | 2016–17 | 30 | 14 | 16 | .467 | Eliminated in regular season |
| Žalgiris | 2017–18 | 36 | 22 | 14 | .611 | Won in 3rd place game |
| Žalgiris | 2018–19 | 34 | 16 | 18 | .471 | Eliminated in quarterfinals |
| Žalgiris | 2019–20 | 28 | 12 | 16 | .429 | Season stopped due to the COVID-19 pandemic |
FC Barcelona
| FC Barcelona | 2020–21 | 40 | 28 | 12 | .700 | Lost in the final game |
| FC Barcelona | 2021–22 | 39 | 28 | 11 | .718 | Won in 3rd place game |
| FC Barcelona | 2022–23 | 39 | 26 | 13 | .667 | Lost in 3rd place game |
| Fenerbahçe | 2023–24 | 27 | 18 | 9 | .667 | Lost in 3rd place game |
| Fenerbahçe | 2024–25 | 39 | 28 | 11 | .718 | Won EuroLeague Championship |
| Fenerbahçe | 2025–26 | 43 | 27 | 16 | .628 | Lost in semi final game |
| Career | | 367 | 221 | 146 | .602 | |

=== Domestic leagues ===
| Team | Year | G | W | L | W–L% | Result |
|---|---|---|---|---|---|---|
Žalgiris
| Žalgiris | 2015–16 | 28 | 24 | 4 | .857 | Won 2016 Lithuanian League Finals |
| Žalgiris | 2016–17 | 47 | 42 | 5 | .894 | Won 2017 Lithuanian League Finals |
| Žalgiris | 2017–18 | 46 | 41 | 5 | .891 | Won 2018 Lithuanian League Finals |
| Žalgiris | 2018–19 | 44 | 40 | 4 | .909 | Won 2019 Lithuanian League Finals |
| Žalgiris | 2019–20 | 24 | 22 | 2 | .917 | Season stopped due to the COVID-19 pandemic (Note: Awarded the 2020 Championship) |
FC Barcelona
| FC Barcelona | 2020–21 | 44 | 38 | 6 | .864 | Won 2021 Spanish League Finals |
| FC Barcelona | 2021–22 | 44 | 33 | 11 | .750 | Lost 2022 Spanish League Finals |
| FC Barcelona | 2022–23 | 43 | 37 | 6 | .860 | Won 2023 Spanish League Finals |
Fenerbahçe
| Fenerbahçe | 2023–24 | 28 | 25 | 3 | .893 | Won 2024 Turkish League Finals |
| Fenerbahçe | 2024–25 | 41 | 36 | 5 | .878 | Won 2025 Turkish League Finals |
| Fenerbahçe | 2025–26 | 40 | 33 | 7 | .825 | Won 2026 Turkish League Finals |
| Career | | 429 | 371 | 58 | .865 | |

== Personal life ==
In 2006, Jasikevičius became the first European player to have his own nominal basketball shoes manufactured by Adidas.

In 2006, Jasikevičius married Israeli model Linor Abargil, the winner of the Miss World 1998 beauty pageant (as Miss Israel). They divorced in 2008.

In 2009, he met Anna Douka, in an Athens bar. Currently, the pair have two children: a girl named Aila, who was born in 2010, and a boy named Lukas, who was born in 2012. Lukas plays basketball in Fenerbahçe U14.

Šarunas' younger brother, Vytenis Jasikevičius, is also a professional basketball player.

In 2015, his biographical book Laimėti neužtenka (English: To win is not enough) was published in Italian, Greek and Lithuanian languages. An English version was also soon released. Later on, Spanish and Israeli publishing houses also showed interest.

On 21 July 2017, Jasikevičius married the mother of his two children, Anna Douka, after 8 years of relationship. The ceremony was held in Greece. Many famous basketball personalities attended the event, including Željko Obradović, Dimitris Itoudis, Mike Batiste, Paulius Jankūnas, Darius Songaila, and others.

== Honors and awards ==
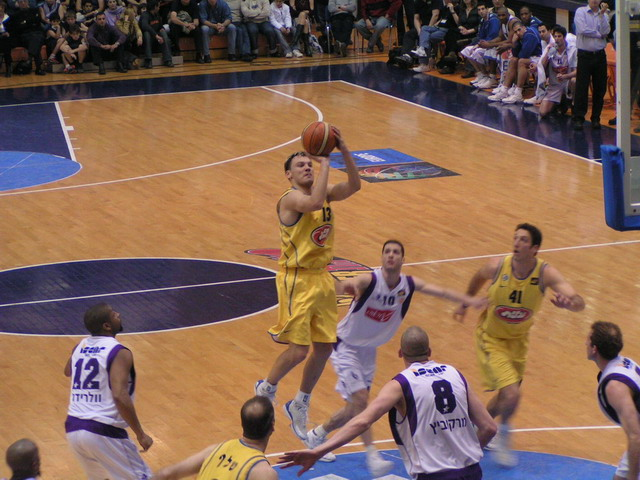
Jasikevičius won two consecutive EuroLeague titles with Maccabi Elite Tel Aviv.

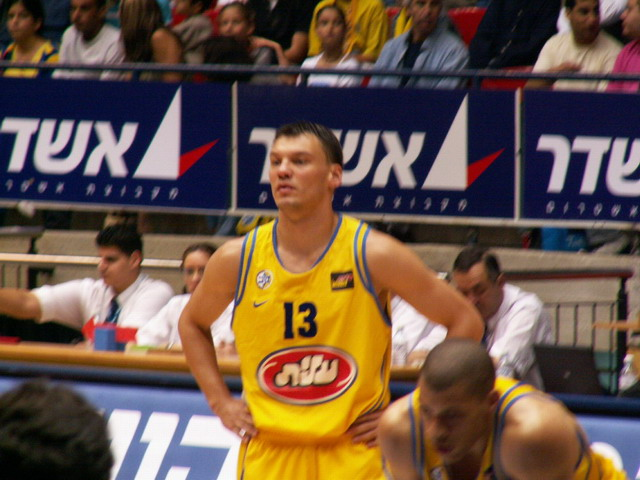
Jasikevičius during his final season as a Maccabi Tel Aviv member

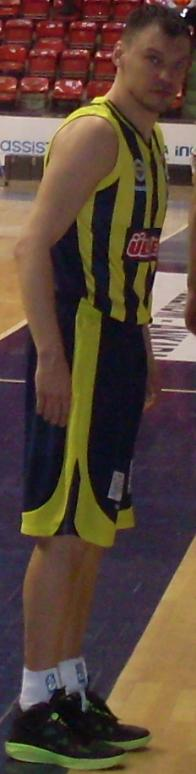
Jasikevičius with Fenerbahçe Ülker as a player

=== State awards ===
- Lithuania: Recipient of the Commander's Grand Cross of the Order of the Lithuanian Grand Duke Gediminas (2007)
- Lithuania: Recipient of the Grand Cross of the Order of the Lithuanian Grand Duke Gediminas (2018)

=== Club career ===
- (Lithuania) Lietuvos Rytas (1998–99)
- (Slovenia) Union Olimpija (1999–2000)
  - Slovenian Cup: (2000)
- (Spain) FC Barcelona (2000–03)
  - EuroLeague Championship: (2003)
  - 2× Spanish Championship: (2001, 2003)
  - 2× Spanish Cup: (2001, 2003)
    - European Triple Crown: (2003)
- (Israel) Maccabi Tel Aviv (2003–05)
  - 2× EuroLeague Championship: (2004, 2005)
  - 2× Israeli Championship: (2004, 2005)
  - 2× Israeli Cup: (2004, 2005)
    - 2× European Triple Crown: (2004, 2005)
- (United States) Indiana Pacers (2005–07)
  - NBA Playoffs: (2005–06)
- (United States) Golden State Warriors (2007)
  - NBA Playoffs: (2006–07)
- (Greece) Panathinaikos (2007–10)
  - EuroLeague Championship: (2009)
  - 3× Greek Championship: (2008, 2009, 2010)
  - 2× Greek Cup: (2008, 2009)
    - European Triple Crown: (2009)
- (Lithuania) Lietuvos Rytas (2010)
- (Turkey) Fenerbahçe (2011)
  - Turkish Championship: (2011)
  - Turkish Cup: (2011)
- (Greece) Panathinaikos (2011–12)
  - Greek Cup: (2012)
- (Spain) FC Barcelona (2012–2013)
  - Spanish Cup: (2013)
- (Lithuania) Žalgiris (2013–14)
  - Lithuanian Championship: (2014)

=== Individual ===
- Spanish League Finals MVP: (2003)
- FIBA EuroBasket All-Tournament Team: (2003)
- FIBA EuroBasket MVP: (2003)
- Mr. Europa: (2003)
- 2× All-EuroLeague Team: (2004, 2005)
- 2× All-Europe Player of the Year (2004, 2005)
- EuroLeague Final Four MVP: (2005)
- EuroLeague Finals Top Scorer: (2005)
- Israeli Super League MVP: (2005)
- 50 Greatest EuroLeague Contributors: (2008)
- Greek League Best Five: (2009)
- EuroLeague 2000–2010 All-Decade Team: (2010)
- Greek Cup MVP: (2012)
- EuroLeague Legend: (2015)
- FIBA EuroBasket 2000–2020 Dream Team: (2020)

=== Coaching honours ===
- (Lithuania) Žalgiris (2016–20)
  - 5× Lithuanian Championship: (2016–2020)
  - 3× King Mindaugas Cup: (2017, 2018, 2020)
- (Spain) FC Barcelona (2020–23)
  - 2× Spanish League: (2021, 2023)
  - 2× Spanish Cup: (2021, 2022)
  - 2× Catalan League: (2022, 2023)
- (Turkey) Fenerbahçe (2023-present)
  - Triple Crown (2024–25)
  - EuroLeague Championship: (2025)
  - 3x Turkish Championship: (2024-2026)
  - 3x Turkish Cup: (2024–2026)
  - 2x Turkish Presidential Cup: (2025, 2026)

=== Coaching individual ===
- EuroLeague Coach of the Year (2025)
- Catalan League Coach of the Year (2022)
- 3× LKL Coach of the Year (2017–2019)

== Filmography ==
| Year | Title | Role | Notes | Ref |
|---|---|---|---|---|
| 2004 | Lietuvos Krepšinis 1920–2004 | Himself | Documentary about basketball in Lithuania in 1920–2004. | |
| 2012 | Mes už... Lietuvą! | Himself | Documentary about the Lithuania men's national basketball team at the EuroBasket 2011 where Jasikevičius played. | |
| 2020 | Krepšinio evangelija pagal Šarą | Himself | Documentary about Jasikevičius by Vidas Mačiulis. | |

Olympic Games
| Preceded by Saulius Štombergas | Flagbearer for Lithuania; Beijing 2008 | Succeeded by Virgilijus Alekna |
