= 2018 LKL Play-offs =

2018 LKL playoffs
Tournament details
- Dates: May 11 – June 18, 2018
- Season: 2017–18
- Teams: 8
- Defending champions: BC Žalgiris

Final positions
- Champions: BC Žalgiris (20th title)
- Runners-up: BC Rytas
- Semifinalists: BC Lietkabelis; BC Neptūnas

The 2018 LKL Playoffs featured the eight best teams of the Lietuvos krepšinio lyga (LKL) basketball league in Lithuania, competing for the championship spot. This was the LKL playoffs' 24th edition. Žalgiris achieved their 20th title overall, eight consecutive.

The quarter-finals were played in a best-of-five format, with the higher seeded team playing the first and (if necessary) third game at home. The semi-finals were played in a best-of-five format and the finals in a best-of-seven format, with the higher seed team playing games 1, 3, 5 and 7 (if necessary) at home.

== Bracket ==
Quarterfinals
1 Žalgiris	3
8 Nevėžis	0
4 Lietkabelis	3
5 Šiauliai	1
2 Lietuvos rytas	3
7 Juventus	0
3 Neptūnas	3
6 Pieno žvaigždės	1

Semifinals
1 Žalgiris	3
4 Lietkabelis	0
2 Lietuvos rytas	3
3 Neptūnas	2

Finals
1 Žalgiris	4
2 Lietuvos rytas	1
Third place series
3 Neptūnas	3
4 Lietkabelis	1

== Quarterfinals ==
Team 1	Series	Team 2	Game 1	Game 2	Game 3	Game 4	Game 5
Žalgiris	3-0	Nevėžis	95-70	96-75	84-69	—	—
Lietuvos rytas	3-0	Juventus	97-64	79-78	102-73	—	—
Neptūnas	3-1	Pieno žvaigždės	91-81	87-92	92-82	64-101	—-
Lietkabelis	3-1	Šiauliai	103-86	84-94	92-68	85-84	—

=== Neptūnas vs Pieno žvaigždės ===
11 May

Boxscore

Neptūnas	91–81	Pieno žvaigždės
Scoring by quarter: 24–28, 27–21, 22–20, 18–12
Pts: L. Kisielius 18; Rebs: S. Galdikas 8 Asts: R. Seibutis 4		Pts: T. Hughes 16; Rebs: V. Bobrov 9 Asts: T. Hughes 4
1-0

Švyturys Arena
Attendance: 2100

14 May

Boxscore

Pieno žvaigždės	92–87	Neptūnas
Scoring by quarter: 17–21, 23–27, 28–20, 24–19
Pts: J. Manigat 22; Rebs: T. Lekūnas 7 Asts: T. Hughes 5		Pts: B. Fields 16; Rebs: L. Kisielius 6 Asts: R. Seibutis 4
1-1

Pieno žvaigždės Arena
Attendance: 500

19 May

Neptūnas	92–82	Pieno žvaigždės
Scoring by quarter: 21–21, 20–16, 23–22, 28–23
Pts: V. Šulskis 21; Rebs: V. Šulskis 8 Asts: T. Delininkaitis 7		Pts: T. Hughes 21; Rebs: V. Bobrov 8 Asts: T. Galeckas 4
2-1

Švyturys Arena

22 May

Pieno žvaigždės	64–101	Neptūnas
'Scoring by quarter: 16–27, 14–23, 15-28, 19-23
Pts: V. Bobrov 13; Rebs: M. Varnas 4 Asts: T. Hughes 5		Pts: B. Fields 19; Rebs: L. Kisielius 8 Asts: L. Kisielius 5
1-3

Pieno žvaigždės Arena

=== Lietuvos rytas vs Juventus ===
11 May

Lietuvos rytas	97–64	Juventus
Scoring by quarter: 15–16, 20–6, 25–19, 37–23
Pts: R. Giedraitis 21; Rebs: L. Mavrokefalidis 11; Asts: C. Kramer 8		Pts: M. Kupšas 18; Rebs: M. Kupšas 9 Asts: D. Bičkauskas 4
1-0

Lietuvos rytas arena

14 May

Juventus	78–79	Lietuvos rytas
Scoring by quarter: 23–25, 14–22, 23–20, 18–12
Pts: A. Ireland 25; Rebs: M. Korniienko 15; Asts: A. Ireland 7		Pts: C. Kramer 20; Rebs: C. Kramer 6 Asts: C. Kramer 6
0-2

19 May

Boxscore

Lietuvos rytas	102–73	Juventus
Scoring by quarter: 29-20, 27–18, 23–14, 23–21
Pts: R. Giedraitis 21; Rebs: A. Jomantas 6 Asts: M.Girdžiūnas 8		Pts: M. Korniienko 21; Rebs: M. Korniienko 10; Asts: A. Ireland 6
3-0

Lietuvos rytas arena
Attendance: 2900

== Semifinals ==
Team 1	Series	Team 2	Game 1	Game 2	Game 3	Game 4	Game 5
Žalgiris	3-0	Lietkabelis	93-69	94-79	83-64	—	—
Lietuvos rytas	3-2	Neptūnas	79-84	67-49	74-67	70-74	88-82

== Finals ==
Team 1	Series	Team 2	Game 1	Game 2	Game 3	Game 4	Game 5	Game 6	Game 7
Žalgiris		Lietuvos rytas	96-83	73-82	90-80	82-78	80-70	—	—

== See also ==
- 2017–18 LKL season
