= 2018 LKL Finals =

Team	Coach	Wins
Žalgiris	Šarūnas Jasikevičius	4
Lietuvos rytas	Rimas Kurtinaitis	1
- Dates: June 9-18
- MVP: (United States) Brandon Davies

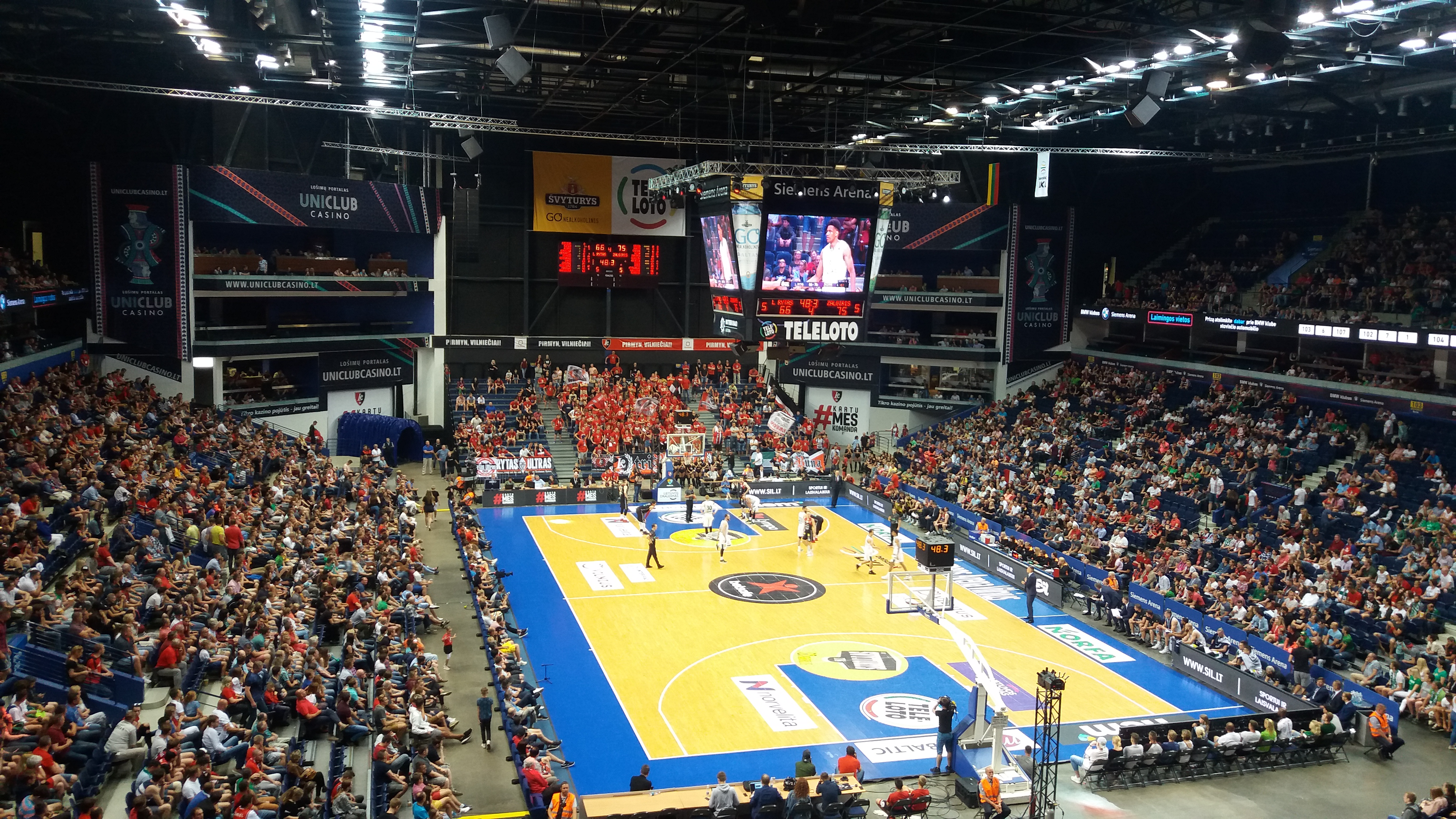
Game 4 at Vilnius, which Žalgiris won

The 2018 LKL Finals was the championship series of the 2017–18 season, of the LKL. The finals series were scheduled from 9 June until 18 June 2018. Due to home court advantage, Žalgiris played Game 1, 3 and 5 at home. Žalgiris defeated Lietuvos rytas 4–1, earning the franchise its 20th LKL championship. Brandon Davies was named the Finals MVP.

== Venues ==
The Žalgiris Arena is a multi-purpose indoor arena in the New Town of Kaunas, Lithuania. The arena is located on an island of the Nemunas River. It is the largest indoor arena in the Baltics. The arena's maximum possible seating capacity for basketball games is 15,552, and 20,000 spectators for concerts (when the stage is in the middle, and 17,000 when stage is in the side of the arena). The Žalgiris Arena replaced the Kaunas Sports Hall as a major venue in the city.

The Siemens Arena, located in Verkiai elderate of Vilnius, is the second largest arena in Lithuania. It generally hosts basketball games as well as concerts. The arena opened on October 30, 2004. The basketball club BC Lietuvos rytas uses the facility for all of its European home fixtures. Siemens Arena also hosts Rytas' home fixtures of the Lithuanian "national derby" against its archrival BC Žalgiris.

Kaunas	2018 LKL Finals (Lithuania)	Vilnius
Žalgiris Arena	2018 LKL Finals (Lithuania)	Siemens Arena
Capacity: 15,552	2018 LKL Finals (Lithuania)	Capacity: 10,000

== Road to the Finals ==
=== Regular season series ===
Žalgiris and Lietuvos rytas tied the regular season series 2–2.

October 08, 2017

Boxscore

Lietuvos rytas 67, Žalgiris 70

Siemens Arena, Vilnius

December 10, 2017

Boxscore

Žalgiris 63, Lietuvos rytas 65

Žalgiris Arena, Kaunas

February 11, 2018

Boxscore

Lietuvos rytas 75, Žalgiris 68

Siemens Arena, Vilnius

April 13, 2018

Boxscore

Žalgiris 77, Lietuvos rytas 66

Žalgiris Arena, Kaunas

== Game summaries ==
=== Game 1 ===
9 June 2018	Žalgiris	96–83 (Series: 1–0)	Lietuvos Rytas	Žalgiris Arena, Kaunas
17:20	Scoring by quarter: 24–26, 26–19, 22–17, 24–21
	Pts: Milaknis 24; Rebs: Davies 7 Asts: Pangos 6	Boxscore	Pts: Giedraitis 17; Rebs: Kramer, Giedraitis 6 Asts: Kramer 7	Attendance: 6,294; Referees: Tomas Jasevičius, Jurgis Laurinavičius, Vilius Mačiulaitis

=== Game 2 ===
11 June 2018	Lietuvos Rytas	82–73 (Series: 1–1)	Žalgiris	Siemens Arena, Vilnius
18:50	Scoring by quarter: 17–15, 22–18, 18–22, 25–18
	Pts: Mavrokefalidis 24; Rebs: Mavrokefalidis, Giedraitis 5 Asts: Peterson 4	Boxscore	Pts: Davies 17; Rebs: White 7 Asts: Pangos 9	Attendance: 7,538; Referees: Jurgis Laurinavičius, Gytis Vilius, Gvidas Gedvilas

=== Game 3 ===
14 June 2018	Žalgiris	90–80 (Series: 2–1)	Lietuvos Rytas	Žalgiris Arena, Kaunas
18:50	Scoring by quarter: 24–19, 16–21, 27–19, 23–21
	Pts: Davies 27; Rebs: Davies, White 7 Asts: Pangos, Udrih 6	Boxscore	Pts: Mavrokefalidis 19; Rebs: Madgen 6 Asts: Kramer 6	Attendance: 8,793; Referees: Tomas Jasevičius, Artūras Šukys, Andrius Maleckas

=== Game 4 ===
16 June 2018	Lietuvos Rytas	78–82 (Series: 3–1)	Žalgiris	Siemens Arena, Vilnius
17:20	Scoring by quarter: 25–23, 18–16, 9–24, 26–19
	Pts: Echodas 16; Rebs: Giedraitis 7 Asts: Kramer 6	Boxscore	Pts: Udrih 16; Rebs: Micić 6 Asts: Udrih 6	Attendance: 7,653; Referees: Jurgis Laurinavičius, Tomas Jasevičius, Gytis Vilius

=== Game 5 ===
18 June 2018	Žalgiris	80–70 (Series: 4–1)	Lietuvos Rytas	Žalgiris Arena, Kaunas
18:50	Scoring by quarter: 18–20, 18–19, 22–17, 22–14
	Pts: Davies 29; Rebs: Davies 8 Asts: Udrih, Micić 6	Boxscore	Pts: Mavrokefalidis 20; Rebs: three players 5 Asts: Kramer 10	Attendance: 10,679; Referees: Tomas Jasevičius, Jurgis Laurinavičius, Artūras Šukys

== Rosters ==
=== Žalgiris ===
Note: Flags indicate national team eligibility at FIBA-sanctioned events. Players may hold other non-FIBA nationalities not displayed.

Žalgiris roster
Players
Coaches

Pos.	No.	Nat.	Name	Ht.	Wt.	Age
C	0	(Uganda)	Davies, Brandon	2.08 m (6 ft 10 in)	109 kg (240 lb)	34 – 25 July 1991
PG	3	(Canada)	Pangos, Kevin	1.86 m (6 ft 1 in)	82 kg (181 lb)	33 – 26 January 1993
SF	6	(France)	Toupane, Axel	2.01 m (6 ft 7 in)	95 kg (209 lb)	33 – 23 July 1992
PG	9	(Slovenia)	Udrih, Beno	1.91 m (6 ft 3 in)	92 kg (203 lb)	43 – 5 July 1982
PF	13	(Lithuania)	Jankūnas, Paulius (C)	2.05 m (6 ft 9 in)	107 kg (236 lb)	41 – 29 April 1984
C	19	(Lithuania)	Sajus, Martynas	2.08 m (6 ft 10 in)	112 kg (247 lb)	29 – 22 February 1996
F/C	20	(Lithuania)	Masiulis, Gytis	2.06 m (6 ft 9 in)	99 kg (218 lb)	27 – 10 April 1998
SG	21	(Lithuania)	Milaknis, Artūras	1.95 m (6 ft 5 in)	90 kg (198 lb)	39 – 16 June 1986
SG	23	(Serbia)	Micic, Vasilije	1.96 m (6 ft 5 in)	92 kg (203 lb)	32 – 13 January 1994
SG	24	(Lithuania)	Arlauskas, Martynas	1.99 m (6 ft 6 in)	89 kg (196 lb)	25 – 10 July 2000
F	30	(United States)	White, Aaron	2.06 m (6 ft 9 in)	104 kg (229 lb)	33 – 10 October 1992
C	44	(Lithuania)	Kavaliauskas, Antanas	2.08 m (6 ft 10 in)	112 kg (247 lb)	41 – 19 September 1984
SG	66	(Lithuania)	Valinskas, Paulius	1.91 m (6 ft 3 in)	83 kg (183 lb)	30 – 9 December 1995
SF	92	(Lithuania)	Ulanovas, Edgaras	1.99 m (6 ft 6 in)	92 kg (203 lb)	34 – 7 January 1992

Head coach

- (Lithuania) Šarūnas Jasikevičius

Assistant coach(es)

- (Lithuania) Darius Maskoliūnas
- (Lithuania) Darius Songaila
- (Lithuania) Evaldas Beržininkaitis

Athletic trainer(s)

- (Lithuania) Nerijus Navickas
- (Lithuania) Justinas Grainys

Doctor

- (Lithuania) Vytautas Kailius

Physiotherapist(s)

- (Lithuania) Paulius Jacikas

Legend

- (C) Team captain
- Injured

- Roster

=== Lietuvos rytas ===
Note: Flags indicate national team eligibility at FIBA-sanctioned events. Players may hold other non-FIBA nationalities not displayed.

Lietuvos rytas roster
Players
Coaches

Pos.	No.	Nat.	Name	Ht.	Wt.	Age
G	20	(United States)	Baron, Jimmy	1.91 m (6 ft 3 in)	89 kg (196 lb)	39 – 23 May 1986
SF	51	(Lithuania)	Butkevičius, Arnas (injured)	1.97 m (6 ft 6 in)	92 kg (203 lb)	33 – 22 October 1992
F/C	14	(Lithuania)	Echodas, Martynas	2.06 m (6 ft 9 in)	102 kg (225 lb)	28 – 7 July 1997
G	31	(Lithuania)	Giedraitis, Rokas	2.00 m (6 ft 7 in)	88 kg (194 lb)	33 – 16 August 1992
PG	18	(Lithuania)	Girdžiūnas, Mindaugas	1.88 m (6 ft 2 in)	86 kg (190 lb)	37 – 20 January 1989
F	21	(Lithuania)	Jomantas, Artūras (C)	2.00 m (6 ft 7 in)	106 kg (234 lb)	40 – 4 May 1985
PG	3	(United States)	Kramer, Chris	1.91 m (6 ft 3 in)	98 kg (216 lb)	37 – 4 April 1988
G/F	8	(Lithuania)	Lukauskis, Mindaugas	1.98 m (6 ft 6 in)	90 kg (198 lb)	46 – 19 May 1979
SG	1	(Australia)	Madgen, Ben	1.93 m (6 ft 4 in)	92 kg (203 lb)	41 – 7 February 1985
C	12	(Greece)	Mavrokefalidis, Loukas	2.10 m (6 ft 11 in)	106 kg (234 lb)	41 – 25 July 1984
C	55	(Lithuania)	Mockevičius, Egidijus	2.08 m (6 ft 10 in)	108 kg (238 lb)	33 – 1 September 1992
PF	42	(United States)	Peterson, Travis	2.08 m (6 ft 10 in)	102 kg (225 lb)	40 – 18 May 1985
F	0	(Lithuania)	Sirvydis, Deividas	2.02 m (6 ft 8 in)	86 kg (190 lb)	25 – 10 June 2000

Head coach

- (Lithuania) Rimas Kurtinaitis

Assistant coach(es)

- (Lithuania) Robertas Kuncaitis
- (Spain) Alberto Blanco
- (Lithuania) Mindaugas Brazys

Athletic trainer(s)

- (Lithuania) Evaldas Kandratavičius

Doctor

- (Lithuania) Mantas Ambraška

Physiotherapist(s)

- (Lithuania) Juozas Petkevičius

Legend

- (C) Team captain
- Injured

- Roster

== See also ==
- 2017–18 LKL season
- 2018 LKL Play-offs
