= List of EuroLeague annual free throw percentage leaders =

In basketball, a free throw is an unopposed attempt to score points from behind the free throw line. The EuroLeague's free throw percentage leader is the player with the highest free throw percentage in a given season.

To qualify as a leader for the free throw percentage, a player must play in at least 60 percent of the total number of possible games.

Nando de Colo and Šarūnas Jasikevičius are the only players in league history to lead the league in free throw percentage multiple occasions.

== Free throw Percentage leaders ==
=== FIBA Euroleague basket Era (1996–2000) ===
Season	Player	Position (Note: The player's primary position is listed first.)	Team	Games played	Free throws made76	Free throws attempted	Free throw %	Ref.
1998–99	(Lithuania) Artūras Karnišovas	F	Fortitudo Bologna	20	86	96	.8958	
1999–00	(Italy) Carlton Myers	G	Fortitudo Bologna	17	79	86	.9186	

=== Euroleague Era (2000–Present) ===
Season	Player	Position (Note: The player's primary position is listed first.)	Team	Games played	Free throws made	Free throws attempted	Free throw %	Ref.
2000–01	(Greece) Evangelos Koronios	G	P.A.O.K. BC	11	36	38	.9474	
2001–02	(United States) (Israel) Derrick Sharp	G	Maccabi Tel Aviv B.C.	20	20	21	.9524	
2002–03	(Lithuania) Šarūnas Jasikevičius	G	FC Barcelona Bàsquet	21	70	73	.9589	
2003–04	(Greece) Andreas Glyniadakis	G	AEK Athens B.C.	14	25	26	.9615	
2004–05	(Lithuania) Šarūnas Jasikevičius (2×)	G	Maccabi Tel Aviv B.C.	24	111	118	.9407	
2005–06	(Greece) Nikos Chatzis	G	Olympiacos B.C.	20	32	33	.9697	
2006–07	(United States) Trajan Langdon	G	CSKA Moscow	25	49	53	.9245	
2007–08	(Lithuania) Šarūnas Jasikevičius (3×)	G	Panathinaikos B.C.	20	76	81	.9383	
2008–09	(United States) Louis Bullock	G	Real Madrid Baloncesto	20	62	65	.9538	
2009–10	(Russia) Vitaly Fridzon	G	BC Khimki	16	27	28	.9643	
2010–11	(France) Nando De Colo	G	Valencia Basket	19	67	70	.9571	
2011–12	(Georgia (country)) Manuchar Markoishvili	G/F	Pallacanestro Cantù	16	18	18	1.000	
2012–13	(Brazil) Marcelo Huertas	G	FC Barcelona Bàsquet	31	35	36	.9722	
2013–14	(Lithuania) Šarūnas Jasikevičius (4×)	G	BC Žalgiris	20	21	21	1.000	
2014–15	(Montenegro) (United States) Taylor Rochestie	G	BC Nizhny Novgorod	21	74	80	.9250	
2015–16	(Croatia) Dario Šarić	F	Anadolu Efes	24	46	49	.9388	
2016–17	(France) Nando De Colo (2×)	G	CSKA Moscow	28	139	145	.9586	
2017–18	(United States) Brian Roberts	G	Olympiacos	32	55	57	.9649	
2018–19	(Azerbaijan) (United States) Jaycee Carroll	G	Real Madrid Baloncesto	31	48	50	.9600	
2019–20 (Note: The number of games played during this season was reduced due to the COVID-19 Pandemic)	(United States) Tyler Cavanaugh	F	Alba Berlin	19	32	33	.9697	
2020–21	(Slovakia) (United States) Kyle Kuric	G/F	FC Barcelona Bàsquet	39	49	51	.9608	
2021–22	(United States) (Turkey) Scottie Wilbekin	G	Maccabi Tel Aviv B.C.	32	86	91	.9451	
2022–23	(United States) (Israel) John DiBartolomeo	G	Maccabi Tel Aviv B.C.	39	55	56	.9821	
2023–24	(United States) Kendrick Nunn	G	Panathinaikos B.C.	35	70	73	.9589	
2024–25	(Israel) Tamir Blatt	G	Maccabi Tel Aviv B.C.	26	38	48	.950	
