= 2025 BSL Playoffs =

BSL Playoffs
- Season: 2024–25
- Dates: 24 May – 25 June 2025
- Games played: 26
- Teams: 10

Finals
- Champions: Fenerbahçe Beko (12th title)
- Runners-up: Beşiktaş Fibabanka
- Semifinalists: Anadolu Efes, Bahçeşehir Koleji
- Finals MVP: (Canada) Khem Birch

2025 Basketbol Süper Ligi (BSL) Playoffs was the final phase of the 2024–25 Basketbol Süper Ligi season. They began on 24 May 2025, with the play-in games, and ended on 25 June 2025.

The six highest placed teams of the regular season qualified for the playoffs directly, while the teams placed from seventh to tenth battled for the remaining two seeds in a play-in tournament. In the quarter-finals a best-of-three was played, in the semi-finals a best-of-five and in the finals a best-of-seven playoff format was used.

Fenerbahçe Beko competed against Beşiktaş Fibabanka in the finals, won the series 4–1 and got their 12th championship, successfully defending their title.

== Qualified teams ==
Pos	Team	Pld	W	L	PF	PA	PD	Pts	Qualification or relegation
1	Fenerbahçe Beko (C)	30	27	3	2650	2393	+257	57	Advance to playoffs
2	Beşiktaş Fibabanka	30	23	7	2697	2453	+244	53	Advance to playoffs
3	Anadolu Efes	30	23	7	2702	2369	+333	53	Advance to playoffs
4	Tofaş	30	19	11	2645	2575	+70	49	Advance to playoffs
5	Bahçeşehir Koleji	30	18	12	2501	2383	+118	48	Advance to playoffs
6	Mersin MSK	30	16	14	2484	2551	−67	46	Advance to playoffs
7	Galatasaray	30	14	16	2575	2594	−19	44	Advanced to play-in
8	ONVO Büyükçekmece	30	13	17	2552	2566	−14	43	Advanced to play-in
9	Bursaspor Yörsan	30	13	17	2568	2689	−121	43	Advanced to play-in
10	Türk Telekom	30	13	17	2484	2499	−15	43	Advanced to play-in

Source: Basketbol Süper Ligi
(C) Champions

== Play-in tournament ==
Only the top six seeds advanced directly to the playoffs, while the next four seeds participated in a play-in tournament. The 7th-place team hosted the 8th-place team in the double-chance round needing to win one game to advance, with the winner clinching the 7th seed in the playoffs. The 9th-place team hosted the 10th-place team in the elimination round requiring two wins to advance, with the loser being eliminated from the competition. The loser in the double-chance round hosted the elimination-round game-winner, with the winner clinching the 8th seed and the loser being eliminated. The higher seeded teams had homecourt advantage. The games were played on 24 and 26 May 2025.

Play-in games
7	Galatasaray	94
8	ONVO Büyükçekmece	90
9	Bursaspor Yörsan	70
10	Türk Telekom	74

No. 8 seed game
8	ONVO Büyükçekmece	73
10	Türk Telekom	84

Final seeds
Galatasaray	No. 7 seed
Türk Telekom	No. 8 seed

=== Seed 7 vs. Seed 8 ===
24 May 2025	Galatasaray	94–90	Onvo Büyükçekmece	Istanbul
15:30 TRT (UTC+3)	Scoring by quarter: 15–23, 26–18, 22–25, 31–24
	Pts: Palmer 23; Rebs: Delgado 12; Asts: Tuncer 5 PIR: Palmer 26	Boxscore	Pts: Starks 23; Rebs: Bruinsma 7 Asts: Starks 12; PIR: Starks 34	Arena: Basketball Development Center; Referees: Orhan Çağrı Hekimoğlu, Polat Parlak, Tolga Edis

=== Seed 9 vs. Seed 10 ===
24 May 2025	Bursaspor Yörsan	70–74	Türk Telekom	Bursa
18:00 TRT (UTC+3)	Scoring by quarter: 21–12, 10–21, 19–15, 20–26
	Pts: J. Brown 15; Rebs: Grantham 11; Asts: DeJulius 6 PIR: Grantham 23	Boxscore	Pts: A. Brown; Rebs: Angola 7 Asts: Hanlan 7 PIR: Hanlan 16	Arena: Tofaş Nilüfer Spor Salonu; Referees: Emin Moğulkoç, Ali Şakacı, Nazlı Çisil Güngör

=== No. 8 Seed Game ===
26 May 2025	Onvo Büyükçekmece	73–84	Türk Telekom	Istanbul
19:00 TRT (UTC+3)	Scoring by quarter: 15–26, 23–19, 17–20, 18–19
	Pts: Franke 21; Rebs: Franke, Sajus 7 Asts: Franke, Love4; PIR: Franke 25	Boxscore	Pts: Tunca 19; Rebs: Bess 7 Asts: Hanlan 7 PIR: Angola 20	Arena: Gazanfer Bilge Spor Salonu; Referees: Özlem Yalman, Fatih Arslanoğlu, Kerem Yılmaz

== Bracket ==
Quarterfinals
1	Fenerbahçe Beko	2
8	Türk Telekom	1
4	Tofaş	1
5	Bahçeşehir Koleji	2
2	Beşiktaş Fibabanka	2
7	Galatasaray	0
3	Anadolu Efes	2
6	Mersin MSK	0

Semifinals
1	Fenerbahçe Beko	3
5	Bahçeşehir Koleji	0
2	Beşiktaş Fibabanka	3
3	Anadolu Efes	2

Finals
1	Fenerbahçe Beko	4
2	Beşiktaş Fibabanka	1

== Quarterfinals ==
The quarterfinals were held from 29 May to 2 June 2025 in a best-of-three format.

=== (1) Fenerbahçe Beko vs. (8) Türk Telekom ===
29 May 2025	Fenerbahçe Beko	89–68 (Series: 1–0)	Türk Telekom	Istanbul
20:30 TRT (UTC+3)	Scoring by quarter: 19–13, 31–25, 23–9, 10–14
	Pts: Baldwin IV 14; Rebs: Şanlı 9 Asts: Gudurić, Melli 5 PIR: Melli 19	Boxscore	Pts: Angola 20; Rebs: Makoundou 7 Asts: Hanlan 9 PIR: Angola 21	Arena: Ülker Sports Arena; Referees: Yener Yılmaz, Hüseyin Çelik, Kaan Büyükçil

31 May 2025	Türk Telekom	85–77(OT) (Series: 1–1)	Fenerbahçe Beko	Ankara
20:30 TRT (UTC+3)	Scoring by quarter: 12–22, 22–17, 22–17, 16–16, Overtime: 13–5
	Pts: Angola 26; Rebs: Alexander 9 Asts: Hanlan 6 PIR: Angola 27	Boxscore	Pts: McCollum, Şanlı 12; Rebs: Hayes-Davis, Melli 6 Asts: Hayes-Davis 5 PIR: Şanlı 19	Arena: Ankara Arena; Referees: Ali Serkan Emlek, Mehmet Serdar Ünal, Polat Parlak

2 June 2025	Fenerbahçe Beko	101–94 (Series: 2–1)	Türk Telekom	Istanbul
20:30 TRT (UTC+3)	Scoring by quarter: 23–20, 28–31, 21–21, 29–22
	Pts: Gudurić 26; Rebs: Colson 6 Asts: Baldwin IV 5 PIR: Gudurić 26	Boxscore	Pts: Brown 24; Rebs: Alexander 7 Asts: Angola, Hanlan 6 PIR: Brown 25	Arena: Ülker Sports Arena; Referees: Mehmet Şahin, Alper Altuğ Köselerli, Uğur Akyıldız

=== (2) Beşiktaş Fibabanka vs. (7) Galatasaray ===
30 May 2025	Beşiktaş Fibabanka	91–75 (Series: 1–0)	Galatasaray	Istanbul
20:30 TRT (UTC+3)	Scoring by quarter: 26–21, 20–19, 25–11, 20–24
	Pts: Mathews, Uğurlu 19; Rebs: Terry 11; Asts: Needham 4 PIR: Uğurlu 27	Boxscore	Pts: Izundu 18; Rebs: Izundu 10; Asts: Tuncer 4 PIR: Izundu 27	Arena: BJK Akatlar Arena; Referees: Emin Moğulkoç, Can Mavisu, Ali Şakacı

1 June 2025	Galatasaray	85–107 (Series: 0–2)	Beşiktaş Fibabanka	Istanbul
20:30 TRT (UTC+3)	Scoring by quarter: 29–23, 27–36, 17–33, 12–15
	Pts: Palmer 19; Rebs: Izundu 6 Asts: Palmer 8 PIR: Young 23	Boxscore	Pts: Mathews 20; Rebs: Arslan 9 Asts: Allman, Needham 5 PIR: Sleva 24	Arena: Basketball Development Center; Referees: Mehmet Şahin, Hüseyin Çelik, Seher Ayşe Nur Yazıcıoğlu

=== (3) Anadolu Efes vs. (6) Mersin MSK ===
30 May 2025	Anadolu Efes	92–71 (Series: 1–0)	Mersin MSK	Istanbul
18:00 TRT (UTC+3)	Scoring by quarter: 28–20, 23–13, 25–21, 16–17
	Pts: Oturu 36; Rebs: Oturu 6 Asts: Larkin 10; PIR: Oturu 41	Boxscore	Pts: Efianayi 15; Rebs: Piñeiro 6 Asts: Cobbs 7 PIR: Cobbs 13	Arena: Basketball Development Center; Referees: Kerem Baki, Fatih Arslanoğlu, Alper Özgök

1 June 2025	Mersin MSK	81–84 (Series: 0–2)	Anadolu Efes	Mersin
18:00 TRT (UTC+3)	Scoring by quarter: 18–25, 20–27, 23–14, 20–18
	Pts: Cruz 27; Rebs: Olaseni, Manek 7 Asts: Cobbs 9 PIR: Cruz 25	Boxscore	Pts: Dozier 17; Rebs: Poirier 5 Asts: Larkin 6 PIR: Dozier 23	Arena: Servet Tazegül Arena; Referees: Yener Yılmaz, Alper Altuğ Köselerli, Uğur Akyıldız

=== (4) Tofaş vs. (5) Bahçeşehir Koleji ===
29 May 2025	Tofaş	94–80 (Series: 1–0)	Bahçeşehir Koleji	Bursa
18:00 TRT (UTC+3)	Scoring by quarter: 30–22, 23–17, 15–29, 26–12
	Pts: Pérez 21; Rebs: Pérez, Demir 5 Asts: Reed 10; PIR: Pérez 24	Boxscore	Pts: Sipahi 17; Rebs: Cavanaugh 10; Asts: Hazer, Ponitka 4 PIR: Ponitka 18	Arena: Tofaş Nilüfer Spor Salonu; Referees: Zafer Yılmaz, Mehmet Karabilecen, Tolga Akkuşoğlu

31 May 2025	Bahçeşehir Koleji	75–65 (Series: 1–1)	Tofaş	Istanbul
18:00 TRT (UTC+3)	Scoring by quarter: 11–20, 25–18, 17–12, 22–15
	Pts: Cavanaugh 14; Rebs: Cavanaugh 10; Asts: five players 5 PIR: Cavanaugh 22	Boxscore	Pts: Saybir 12; Rebs: Saybir 8 Asts: Saybir 4 PIR: Saybir 21	Arena: Sinan Erdem Dome; Referees: Emin Moğulkoç, Özlem Yalman, Ziya Özorhon

2 June 2025	Tofaş	92–96(OT) (Series: 1–2)	Bahçeşehir Koleji	Bursa
18:00 TRT (UTC+3)	Scoring by quarter: 24–14, 18–24, 19–22, 24–25, Overtime: 7–11
	Pts: Reed 34; Rebs: Pasečņiks 8 Asts: Pérez 8 PIR: Reed 34	Boxscore	Pts: Cavanaugh 23; Rebs: Cavanaugh 8 Asts: Ponitka 4 PIR: Cavanaugh 26	Arena: Tofaş Nilüfer Spor Salonu; Referees: Kerem Baki, Kaan Büyükçil, Alper Özgök

== Semifinals ==
The semifinals were held from 5 to 14 June 2025 in a best-of-four format.

=== (1) Fenerbahçe Beko vs. (5) Bahçeşehir Koleji ===
5 June 2025	Fenerbahçe Beko	93–76 (Series: 1–0)	Bahçeşehir Koleji	Istanbul
20:30 TRT (UTC+3)	Scoring by quarter: 20–14, 22–22, 28–18, 23–22
	Pts: Hayes-Davis 21; Rebs: Melli 7 Asts: three players 4 PIR: Hayes-Davis 19	Boxscore	Pts: Odiase 16; Rebs: Smith 6 Asts: Sipahi 6 PIR: Odiase 15	Arena: Ülker Sports Arena; Referees: Emin Moğulkoç, Ziya Özorhon, Ayşe Nur Yazıcıoğlu

7 June 2025	Fenerbahçe Beko	91–89 (Series: 2–0)	Bahçeşehir Koleji	Istanbul
20:30 TRT (UTC+3)	Scoring by quarter: 25–22, 21–24, 22–21, 23–22
	Pts: Baldwin IV 18; Rebs: Melli 10; Asts: Baldwin IV 4 PIR: Hayes-Davis 18	Boxscore	Pts: Korkmaz, Sipahi 14; Rebs: Simonović 6 Asts: Sipahi 5 PIR: Simonović 18	Arena: Ülker Sports Arena; Referees: Özlem Yalman, Ali Şakacı, Alper Özgök

9 June 2025	Bahçeşehir Koleji	84–93 (Series: 0–3)	Fenerbahçe Beko	Istanbul
20:30 TRT (UTC+3)	Scoring by quarter: 14–25, 22–22, 23–22, 25–24
	Pts: Hazer 19; Rebs: Cavanaugh 7 Asts: Hazer 7 PIR: Hazer 24	Boxscore	Pts: Baldwin IV, Birsen 16; Rebs: Birch 10; Asts: Baldwin IV 5 PIR: Birsen 22	Arena: Sinan Erdem Spor Salonu; Referees: Ali Serkan Emlek, Kaan Büyükçil, Hüseyin Çelik

=== (2) Beşiktaş Fibabanka vs. (3) Anadolu Efes ===
6 June 2025	Beşiktaş Fibabanka	87–90 (Series: 0–1)	Anadolu Efes	Istanbul
20:30 TRT (UTC+3)	Scoring by quarter: 24–26, 22–24, 25–18, 16–22
	Pts: Sleva 22; Rebs: Sleva 9 Asts: Allman, Uğurlu 7 PIR: Sleva 26	Boxscore	Pts: Larkin 35; Rebs: Oturu 5 Asts: Dozier 5 PIR: Larkin 35	Arena: BJK Akatlar Arena; Referees: Yener Yılmaz, Mehmet Karabilecen, Tolga Akkuşoğlu

8 June 2025	Beşiktaş Fibabanka	97–70 (Series: 1–1)	Anadolu Efes	Istanbul
20:30 TRT (UTC+3)	Scoring by quarter: 24–18, 23–18, 23–21, 27–13
	Pts: Mathews 17; Rebs: Sleva 7 Asts: Uğurlu 6 PIR: Uğurlu 22	Boxscore	Pts: Bryant 23; Rebs: Poirier 6 Asts: Larkin 4 PIR: Bryant 17	Arena: BJK Akatlar Arena; Referees: Kerem Baki, Fatih Arslanoğlu, Mehmet Serdar Ünal

10 June 2025	Anadolu Efes	94–87 (Series: 1–2)	Beşiktaş Fibabanka	Istanbul
20:30 TRT (UTC+3)	Scoring by quarter: 26–22, 25–21, 27–22, 16–22
	Pts: Oturu 22; Rebs: Dozier, Willis 6 Asts: Larkin 10; PIR: Oturu 25	Boxscore	Pts: Needham 19; Rebs: Uğurlu 4 Asts: Needham 8 PIR: Needham 27	Arena: Basketball Development Center; Referees: Emin Moğulkoç, Zafer Yılmaz, Polat Parlak

12 June 2025	Anadolu Efes	64–75 (Series: 2–2)	Beşiktaş Fibabanka	Istanbul
20:30 TRT (UTC+3)	Scoring by quarter: 18–23, 19–19, 15–13, 12–20
	Pts: Nwora 19; Rebs: Larkin 8 Asts: Dozier 5 PIR: Nwora 17	Boxscore	Pts: Mathews 25; Rebs: Sleva 8 Asts: Uğurlu 3 PIR: Mathews 22	Arena: Basketball Development Center; Referees: Ali Serkan Emlek, Özlem Yalman, Hüseyin Çelik

14 June 2025	Beşiktaş Fibabanka	82–75 (Series: 3–2)	Anadolu Efes	Istanbul
20:30 TRT (UTC+3)	Scoring by quarter: 21–17, 27–23, 18–21, 16–14
	Pts: Mathews 28; Rebs: Arslan, Sleva 8 Asts: Allman 3 PIR: Arslan 24	Boxscore	Pts: Dozier 21; Rebs: Oturu 4 Asts: Larkin 4 PIR: Dozier 19	Arena: BJK Akatlar Arena; Referees: Mehmet Karabilecen, Kerem Baki, Hüseyin Çelik

== Final ==
The final was held from 17 to 25 June 2025 in a best-of-five format.

=== (1) Fenerbahçe Beko vs. (2) Beşiktaş Fibabanka ===
17 June 2025	Fenerbahçe Beko	94–76 (Series: 1–0)	Beşiktaş Fibabanka	Istanbul
20:30 TRT (UTC+3)	Scoring by quarter: 22–16, 28–18, 23–18, 21–24
	Pts: Birch 15; Rebs: Hayes-Davis 7 Asts: Gudurić 6 PIR: Birch 19	Boxscore	Pts: Needham 14; Rebs: Plavšić, Sleva 5 Asts: Allman, Needham 5 PIR: Needham 19	Arena: Ülker Sports Arena; Referees: Yener Yılmaz, Kaan Büyükçil, Polat Parlak

19 June 2025	Fenerbahçe Beko	84–76 (Series: 2–0)	Beşiktaş Fibabanka	Istanbul
20:30 TRT (UTC+3)	Scoring by quarter: 28–18, 20–16, 20–21, 16–21
	Pts: Birch 18; Rebs: Hayes-Davis 8 Asts: Hall 4 PIR: Birch 22	Boxscore	Pts: Mathews 20; Rebs: Sleva 6 Asts: Needham 7 PIR: Mathews 16	Arena: Ülker Sports Arena; Referees: Emin Moğulkoç, Ziya Özorhon, Tolga Akkuşoğlu

21 June 2025	Beşiktaş Fibabanka	98–77 (Series: 1–2)	Fenerbahçe Beko	Istanbul
20:30 TRT (UTC+3)	Scoring by quarter: 22–9, 28–22, 22–25, 26–21
	Pts: Mathews 25; Rebs: Arslan 7 Asts: Arslan 6 PIR: Arslan 32	Boxscore	Pts: Baldwin IV, Hall 14; Rebs: four players 4 Asts: Baldwin IV, Hall 3 PIR: Hall 16	Arena: Basketball Development Center; Referees: Serkan Emlek, Mehmet Karabilecen, Ayşe Nur Yazıcıoğlu

23 June 2025	Beşiktaş Fibabanka	87–91 (Series: 1–3)	Fenerbahçe Beko	Istanbul
20:30 TRT (UTC+3)	Scoring by quarter: 22–26, 23–23, 20–19, 22–23
	Pts: Mathews 26; Rebs: Terry 6 Asts: Allman 5 PIR: Mathews 21	Boxscore	Pts: Baldwin IV 24; Rebs: Birch 8 Asts: Hayes-Davis 5 PIR: Hayes-Davis 21	Arena: Basketball Development Center; Referees: Kerem Baki, Hüseyin Çelik, Serdar Ünal

25 June 2025	Fenerbahçe Beko	84–68 (Series: 4–1)	Beşiktaş Fibabanka	Istanbul
20:30 TRT (UTC+3)	Scoring by quarter: 21–18, 27–22, 21–14, 15–14
	Pts: Hayes-Davis 16; Rebs: Birsen, Melli 7 Asts: Baldwin IV 7 PIR: Baldwin IV 18	Boxscore	Pts: Mathews 19; Rebs: three players 4 Asts: Uğurlu 3 PIR: three players 12	Arena: Ülker Sports Arena; Referees: Zafer Yılmaz, Fatih Arslanoğlu, Ali Şakacı

2025 BSL Champions
Fenerbahçe Beko
12th Title
