= 2019 LKL Play-offs =

2019 LKL playoffs
Tournament details
- Dates: April – June 1, 2019
- Season: 2018–19
- Teams: 8
- Defending champions: BC Žalgiris

Final positions
- Champions: BC Žalgiris (21st title)
- Runners-up: BC Rytas
- Semifinalists: BC Lietkabelis; BC Neptūnas

The 2019 LKL Playoffs featured the eight best teams of the Lietuvos krepšinio lyga (LKL) basketball league in Lithuania, competing for the championship spot. This was the LKL playoffs' 25th edition. Žalgiris achieved their 21st title overall, ninth consecutive.

The quarter-finals and semi-finals were played in a best-of-three format, with the higher seeded team playing the first and (if necessary) third game at home. The finals were played in a best-of-five format, with the higher seed team playing games 1, 3 and 5 (if necessary) at home.

== Bracket ==
Quarterfinals
1 Žalgiris	2
8 Dzūkija	0
4 Lietkabelis	2
5 Pieno žvaigždės	0
2 Neptūnas	2
7 Skycop	1
3 Rytas	2
6 Juventus	1

Semifinals
1 Žalgiris	2
4 Lietkabelis	0
2 Neptūnas	0
3 Rytas	2

Finals
1 Žalgiris	3
2 Rytas	0
Third place series
3 Lietkabelis	0
4 Neptūnas	3

== Quarterfinals ==
Team 1	Series	Team 2	Game 1	Game 2	Game 3
Žalgiris	2–0	Dzūkija	89–70	81–62	
Neptūnas	2–1	Skycop Prienai	102–78	85–94	77–71
Rytas	2–1	Juventus	93–91	83–92	84–63
Lietkabelis	2–0	Pieno žvaigždės	95–87	105–98	

== Semifinals ==
Team 1	Series	Team 2	Game 1	Game 2	Game 3
Žalgiris	2–0	Lietkabelis	78–58	84–63	
Neptūnas	0–2	Rytas	46–75	70–83	

== Third–place series ==
Team 1	Series	Team 2	Game 1	Game 2	Game 3	Game 4	Game 5
Neptūnas	3–0	Lietkabelis	89–77	88–75	84–77		

== Finals ==
Team 1	Series	Team 2	Game 1	Game 2	Game 3	Game 4	Game 5
Žalgiris	3–0	Rytas	79–64	85–67	92–54		

== See also ==
- 2018–19 LKL season
