= Chris Kramer =

American basketball player

Chris Kramer כריס קרמר
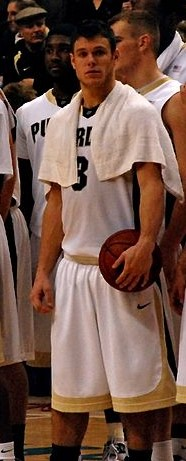
- Kramer playing for Purdue

Personal information
- Born: April 4, 1988 (age 37) Huntington, Indiana, U.S.
- Listed height: 6 ft 3 in (1.91 m)
- Listed weight: 215 lb (98 kg)

Career information
- High school: Huntington North (Huntington, Indiana)
- College: Purdue (2006–2010)
- NBA draft: 2010: undrafted
- Playing career: 2010–2022
- Position: Point guard / shooting guard

Career history
- 2010–2011: Fort Wayne Mad Ants
- 2011: Mets de Guaynabo
- 2011–2012: Würzburg
- 2012–2017: Oldenburg
- 2017–2019: Lietuvos rytas / Rytas
- 2019–2020: Khimki Moscow
- 2020–2021: Hapoel Jerusalem
- 2021–2022: Gran Canaria

Career highlights
- King Mindaugas Cup winner (2019); LKL Defensive Player of the Year (2018); BCL Star Lineup Second Best Team (2017); 2× Big Ten Defensive Player of the Year (2008, 2010); Third-team All-Big Ten – Media (2008); 3× Big Ten All-Defensive team (2008–2010)

Christopher Scott Kramer (born April 4, 1988) is an American former professional basketball player. He played college basketball with the Purdue University Boilermakers. Kramer participated with the 2010 Milwaukee Bucks training camp and played in the NBA Development League for the Fort Wayne Mad Ants in the 2010–11 season.

== High school career ==
=== Huntington North (IN) ===
==== 2002–2006 ====
Chris Kramer played varsity basketball, baseball, and football at Huntington North High School in Huntington, Indiana. Averaging 19.1 points, four assists, and three steals a game playing for coach Eric Foister, he led the Vikings to an 18–3 record as a Senior. He was selected as a member of the 2006 Indiana All-Star Team, along with current NBA players Greg Oden and Mike Conley Jr. In football, he had a career total of 1,336 passing yards and 997 rushing yards at quarterback.

== College career ==
=== 2006–2007 ===
Chris Kramer attended Purdue University to play basketball under head coach, Matt Painter. During his freshman season, Kramer set the school's freshman record for most steals in a season, while leading the team with 64, shattering Brian Cardinal's prior record of 51. Kramer finished with and was second in the conference in total steals on the season. Averaging 7.2 ppg and 2.9 rpg, he had a season high six steals twice against Wagner College and Penn State. He helped lead the Boilermakers to an NCAA tournament appearance along with Seniors David Teague and Carl Landry, where Purdue beat Arizona in the first round and lost to eventual/defending champs, Florida. He averaged 3.5 steals and 15 points in the two games. In the First Round game, Kramer fell to the floor on a play with the ball, where he made a shot off his knees. Finishing the season with a 22–12 record, he was named to the Big Ten All-Defensive Team.

=== 2007–2008 ===
In his Sophomore season, averaging 6.8 ppg, he led the Boilers for the second season in a row in assists (95) and steals, averaging 2.3 per contest. He helped lead the baby boilers to a second straight Second round appearance, where they defeated Baylor in the first round and eventually lost to a senior-led Xavier and finished the season with a 25–9 record. He finished his sophomore season leading the conference in total steals with 67 take-aways, while recording the 9th most in school history with 139 in just two seasons. As a team captain, he was named Third Team All-Big Ten and Academic All-Big Ten, while being the Big Ten Defensive Player of the Year.

=== 2008–2009 ===
As a captain in his junior season, he shared the role with Robbie Hummel and fellow Junior, Keaton Grant. Kramer helped lead Purdue to an 11–2 pre-season finish. After sitting out for a foot injury in a road game at Penn State, and having an 0–2 start in conference play, Kramer helped lead the Boilers to an 11–7 conference record. On January 31, Kramer was elbowed in the face by Michigan's Manny Harris, breaking his nose in two places, which forced him to wear a face mask for the following six games. Along with teammate JaJuan Johnson, he was named to the Big Ten-All Defensive Team, finishing short to Michigan State's Travis Walton as defensive player of the year. Kramer was also named to consecutive Academic All-Big Ten selections. He led his team to the 2009 NCAA Tournament, along with Purdue's first Sweet Sixteen appearance in 9 years, where they eventually fell to #1 seeded UConn. He wrapped up his junior season with the second most steals in school history with 214 career steals.

=== 2009–2010 ===
Kramer started his senior season with his third straight team captain role, becoming only the fourth to do so in school history, behind the likes of Terry Dischinger (1960–62), Brian Walker (1979–81), and former assistant coach, Cuonzo Martin (1993–95). Against Valparaiso on December 9, 2009, he dished out a season high 7 assists. On March 3, 2010, Kramer scored a season high 18 points against in-state rival Indiana, shooting 7 of 8 from the floor in his last game at Mackey Arena. Kramer recorded ten 3+ steal outings on the season (10–0), including four 4-steal performances. He led the Boilermakers to a 14–4 conference record and onto a Big Ten Conference title, its first in fourteen years. After the culmination of the regular season, Kramer was given his conference record fourth consecutive Big Ten All-Defensive Team honor, while being named the Big Ten Defensive Player of the Year for the second time, while also being a Big Ten Honorable Mention and Academic All-Big Ten for the third consecutive year. With Purdue receiving a 4 seed in the NCAA tournament, Kramer helped lead the Boilers past heavily favored Siena in the NCAA First Round match up, where he scored 10 points and had 4 steals and onto consecutive Sweet Sixteens after beating Texas A&M, where he tallied 17 points, 3 steals, and 7 rebounds before being held scoreless in his last collegiate game in a loss to Duke. Purdue went on to a 29–6 record in his senior year, which tied for the program's most wins in a single season. He finished the season with season-career highs with 228 points with a club-leading 58 percent from the floor. As a senior, Kramer was one of ten candidates for the Lowe's Senior CLASS Award with Notre Dame's Luke Harangody, West Virginia's Da'Sean Butler, Duke's Jon Scheyer, and fellow Big Ten player, Raymar Morgan, of Michigan State. He overwhelmingly won the fan vote, having more than 33 percent of total fan votes, but came up short to Da'Sean Butler. He wrapped up his career at Purdue being named a First Team Senior All-American. During the 2010 Final Four weekend at Lucas Oil Stadium, Kramer participated in the Senior Reeses/Hersheys All-Star Game.

=== Career notes ===
Kramer currently owns the school record for career steals per game, averaging 2.1 a contest. He became the first Big Ten player in 16 years to lead the league in steals two consecutive seasons (2008, 2009). On February 28, 2010, against Michigan State, Kramer recorded another school record with his 260th career steal, surpassing Brian Cardinal's mark of 259. He finished his career as a Boiler with a 274 steals, 850 points, 397 rebounds, and shooting 71 percent at the line. He placed second all-time in games played (133) behind Keaton Grant, third in starts (114), and fourth in minutes played (3,704). He graduated with a degree in Organizational Leadership & Supervision.

== Professional career ==
=== America (2010–11) ===
==== Indiana Pacers (summer league) ====
After by-passing an opportunity in his fifth year of college eligibility to play Purdue Football, Kramer joined the 2010 AirTran Airways Pro Summer League, made up of other undrafted/free agent players. He played for the Indiana Pacers summer league team, where he played in only two games and averaged 4 points, 3 rebounds, 1 assist, and 1.5 steals per game, while going 42.9 percent from the field.

==== Milwaukee Bucks (training camp) ====
After spending the summer with the Indiana Pacers in the Orlando Pro Summer League, Kramer, an undrafted free agent, officially became part of the Milwaukee Bucks training camp roster for the 2011 NBA season. He was released on October 19.

==== Fort Wayne Mad Ants ====
After being cut by the Bucks, Kramer joined the Fort Wayne Mad Ants of the NBA D-League. On December 8, he was waived by the Mad Ants due to injury. He had played 5 games. On December 28, Kramer was re-signed by the Mad Ants. He took fellow injured player Chris Hunter's spot on the roster.

=== Puerto Rico (2011) ===
In the summer of 2011, Kramer signed with Mets de Guaynabo of the Baloncesto Superior Nacional.

=== s.oliver Baskets Würzburg (2011–2012) ===
Kramer played one year with Würzburg in the German Basketball Bundesliga. Würzburg reaches the semifinals of the 2012 playoffs. Kramer led the team in scoring with 11.2 point per game.

=== EWE Baskets Oldenburg (2012–2017) ===
In the summer of 2012, Kramer signed with the EWE Baskets Oldenburg. On January 11, 2017, Kramer recorded his first career triple-double (and became the first player to record a triple double in the Basketball Champions League) when he recorded 16 points, 13 assists, and 10 rebounds in a 106–71 win over Uşak Sportif in the Basketball Champions League. His performance gathered him the BCL Game Day MVP.

On June 22, 2017, he left Oldenburg after five seasons.

=== Lietuvos rytas Vilnius (2017–2019) ===
On July 20, 2017, Lietuvos rytas Vilnius head coach Rimas Kurtinaitis confirmed that the team has reached an agreement with Kramer. On July 22, 2017, it was officially announced. During the season closing ceremony, Kramer was named as the LKL Defensive Player of the Year.

=== Khimki (2019–2020) ===
On August 4, 2019, Kramer signed a one-year contract with Russian club Khimki of the VTB United League and the EuroLeague, with an option for another season. He averaged 5.5 points per game. Kramer parted ways with the team on September 6, 2020.

=== Hapoel Jerusalem (2020–2021) ===
On September 20, 2020, Kramer signed with Hapoel Jerusalem of the Israeli Basketball Premier League. On September 23, 2020, Kramer was waived from the team due to health issues. On November 22 the team announced that Kramer would remain with the team until the end of the season. In 2020–21 he was third in the league with 1.8 steals per game.

=== Gran Canaria (2021–2022) ===
On August 18, 2021, he has signed with Gran Canaria of the Spanish Liga ACB.
