= Tyler Cavanaugh =

American basketball player (born 1994)

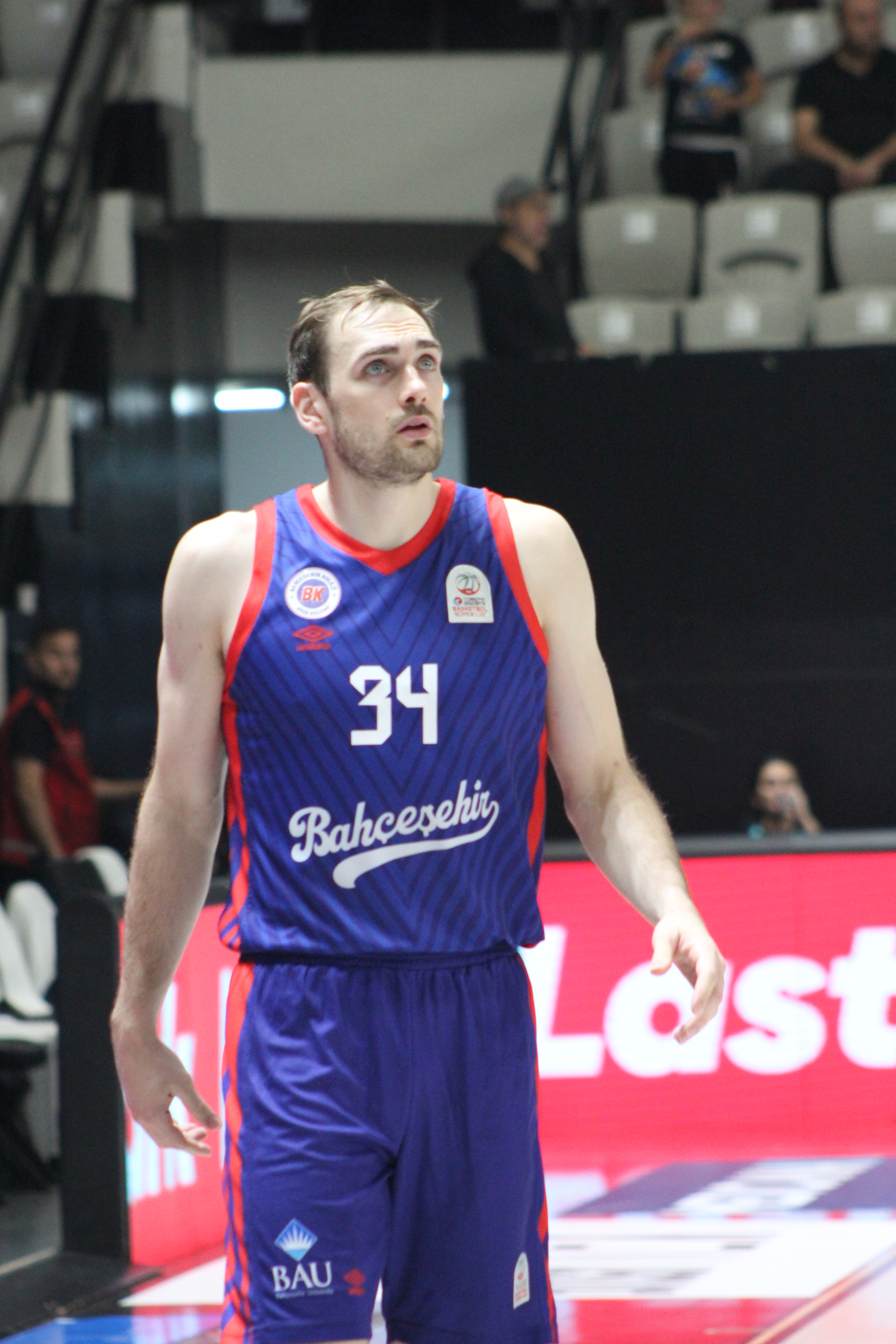
- Tyler Cavanaugh playing for Bahçeşehir Koleji

No. 34 – Bahçeşehir Koleji
- Position: Power forward
- League: Basketbol Süper Ligi

Personal information
- Born: February 9, 1994 (age 32) Syracuse, New York, U.S.
- Listed height: 6 ft 9 in (2.06 m)
- Listed weight: 238 lb (108 kg)

Career information
- High school: Jamesville-DeWitt (DeWitt, New York)
- College: Wake Forest (2012–2014); George Washington (2015–2017)
- NBA draft: 2017: undrafted
- Playing career: 2017–present

Career history
- 2017–2018: Atlanta Hawks
- 2017–2018: →Erie BayHawks
- 2018–2019: Utah Jazz
- 2018–2019: →Salt Lake City Stars
- 2019–2020: Alba Berlin
- 2020–2021: Lenovo Tenerife
- 2021–2023: Žalgiris Kaunas
- 2023–present: Bahçeşehir Koleji

Career highlights
- LKL champion (2023); 2× King Mindaugas Cup winner (2022, 2023); Bundesliga champion (2020); EuroLeague free throw percentage leader (2020); 2× Second-team All-Atlantic 10 (2016, 2017); NIT champion (2016); NIT MVP (2016)
- Stats at NBA.com
- Stats at Basketball Reference
Medals
Men's basketball
Representing the United States
FIBA AmeriCup
Bronze medal – third place	2025 Managua

Tyler Robert Cavanaugh (born February 9, 1994) is an American professional basketball player for Bahçeşehir Koleji of the Turkish Basketbol Süper Ligi (BSL). He played college basketball for Wake Forest and George Washington.

== College career ==
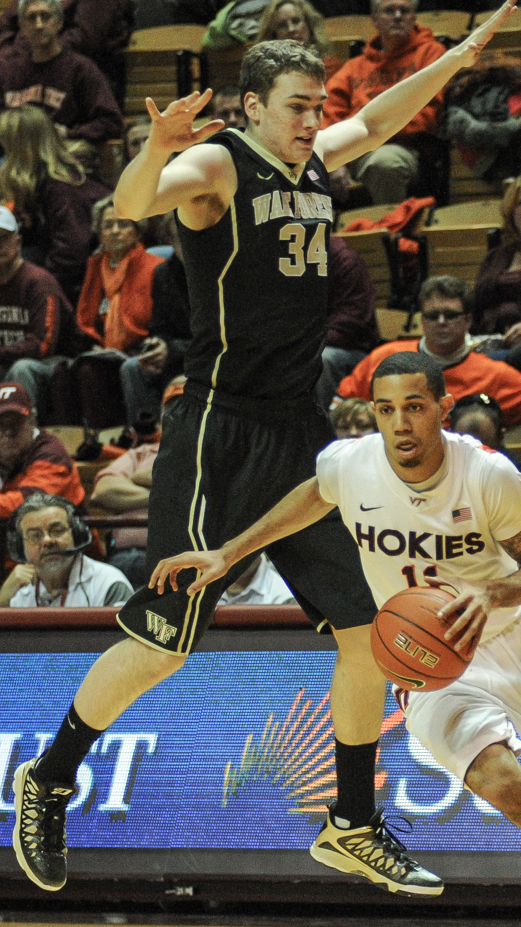
Cavanaugh at Wake Forest.

Cavanaugh started his college career at Wake Forest University, where he played two seasons from 2012 to 2014. He transferred to George Washington University for his last two seasons, where he played from 2015 to 2017. He was twice named second-team All-Atlantic 10 Conference and in 2016 won the National Invitation Tournament, earning MVP honors. As a senior, Cavanaugh averaged 18.3 points, 8.4 rebounds and 2.0 assists per game.

== Professional career ==
=== Atlanta Hawks / Erie BayHawks (2017–2018) ===
On November 5, 2017, after signing a training camp deal and later being waived by the Atlanta Hawks and playing a game for the Erie BayHawks earlier in the season, Cavanaugh signed a two-way contract with Atlanta. He made his NBA debut the same day, collecting a rebound in the Hawks' win.

On December 18, 2017, the Hawks signed Cavanauagh to a two-year contract after tallying the fourth-highest three-point field goal percentage among rookies. Cavanaugh played impressively while most of the team's front-line was out due to injuries. He became the second player to convert his original two-way contract into a full contract (only behind Mike James), as well as the first to receive a multi-year contract after finishing his original contract. He passed his career highs in points, rebounds, and assists with 16 points, six rebounds, and two assists in a 106–105 loss to the New Orleans Pelicans on November 13, 2017. On December 9, 2017, he scored 14 points, along with 3 three-pointers, in a win over the Orlando Magic. On May 11, 2018, he was waived by the Hawks.

=== Utah Jazz / Salt Lake City Stars (2018–2019) ===
On August 1, 2018, the Utah Jazz signed Cavanaugh to a two-way contract. He appeared in 11 NBA games for the Jazz.

=== Alba Berlin (2019–2020) ===
On July 21, 2019, Cavanaugh signed with Alba Berlin of the Basketball Bundesliga. He averaged 7.2 points and 3.6 rebounds per game.

=== Iberostar Tenerife (2020–2021) ===
On July 17, 2020, Cavanaugh signed with Iberostar Tenerife of the Liga ACB.

=== Žalgiris Kaunas (2021–2023) ===
On June 15, 2021, Cavanaugh signed a three-year (2+1) contract with Žalgiris Kaunas of the Lithuanian Basketball League (LKL) and the EuroLeague. On June 22, 2023, he mutually parted ways with the club after two seasons.

=== Bahçeşehir Koleji (2023–present) ===
On July 8, 2023, Cavanaugh signed a one-year deal with Bahçeşehir Koleji of the Basketbol Süper Ligi (BSL).

== Personal life ==
His father, John Cavanaugh, played basketball at Hamilton College and played professionally overseas.

== Career statistics ==
Legend
GP	Games played	GS	Games started	MPG	Minutes per game
FG%	Field-goal percentage	3P%	3-point field-goal percentage	FT%	Free-throw percentage
RPG	Rebounds per game	APG	Assists per game	SPG	Steals per game
BPG	Blocks per game	PPG	Points per game	PIR	Performance index rating
**Bold**	Career high

=== Regular season ===
Year	Team	GP	GS	MPG	FG%	3P%	FT%	RPG	APG	SPG	BPG	PPG
2017–18	Atlanta	**39**	**1**	**13.3**	**.441**	**.360**	.810	**3.3**	**.7**	**.2**	**.1**	**4.7**
2018–19	Utah	11	0	3.5	.300	.200	**1.000**	.7	.1	.0	.0	.8
Career		50	1	11.1	.432	.351	.826	2.7	.6	.2	.1	3.8

=== EuroLeague ===
*	Led the league

Year	Team	GP	GS	MPG	FG%	3P%	FT%	RPG	APG	SPG	BPG	PPG	PIR
2019–20	Alba Berlin	19	1	14.6	.370	.357	**.970***	3.3	.9	**.5**	**.2**	6.4	6.4
2021–22	Žalgiris	**30**	**25**	**25.8**	**.460**	**.378**	.767	**5.1**	**1.5**	**.5**	**.2**	**9.7**	**10.0**
2022–23	Žalgiris	14	2	20.1	.337	.326	.769	4.3	1.0	.4	.1	5.9	6.0
Career		63	28	21.2	.415	.362	.855	4.4	1.2	.5	.2	7.8	8.0
