= 2017–18 LKL season =

Betsafe-LKL
- Season: 2017–18
- Duration: September 2017 – June 2018
- Games played: 220 (regular season)
- Teams: 10

Regular season
- Season MVP: Laurynas Birutis
- Relegated: Vytautas

Finals
- Champions: Žalgiris (20th title)
- Runners-up: Lietuvos rytas
- Third place: Neptūnas
- Fourth place: Lietkabelis

Records
- Average attendance: 2,478

The 2017–18 Lietuvos krepšinio lyga, also called Betsafe-LKL for sponsorship reasons, was the 25th season of the top-tier level professional basketball league of Lithuania, the Lietuvos krepšinio lyga (LKL). The season started in September 2017, and the last game of final series was played on 18 June 2018.

Žalgiris is the defending champion.

== Competition format ==
During the regular season, all teams will play 36 games. The top eight teams in the regular season standings, after playing their entire 36 game schedule, will each qualify for the playoffs in the quarterfinals, that will be played in a best-of-five games format. The semifinals will also be played in that format.

The final round will be played between the two winners of the semifinals. The finals series, for first place, will be played in a best-of-seven format, while the series for third place will be played in a best-of-five format.

== Teams ==
Location of teams in 2017–18 LKL

Team	Location	Arena	Capacity
Dzūkija	Alytus	Alytus Arena	5,500
Juventus	Utena	Utena Arena	2,000
Lietkabelis	Panevėžys	Cido Arena	5,950
Lietuvos rytas	Vilnius	Lietuvos rytas Arena	2,500
Lietuvos rytas	Vilnius	Siemens Arena	10,000
Neptūnas	Klaipėda	Švyturys Arena	6,200
Nevėžis	Kėdainiai	Kėdainiai Arena	2,200
Pieno žvaigždės	Pasvalys	Pieno žvaigždės Arena	1,500
Šiauliai	Šiauliai	Šiauliai Arena	5,700
Vytautas	Prienai-Birštonas	Prienai Arena	1,500
Žalgiris	Kaunas	Žalgiris Arena	15,708

== Regular season ==
In the regular season, teams play against each other four times, home-and-away, in double a round-robin format. The eight first qualified teams advance to the play-offs. The regular season started on 19 September 2017.

=== Table ===
Pos	Team	Pld	W	L	PF	PA	PD	Qualification or relegation
1	Žalgiris	36	32	4	3014	2451	+563	Advance to play-offs
2	Lietuvos rytas	36	30	6	3162	2704	+458	Advance to play-offs
3	Neptūnas	36	25	11	3011	2838	+173	Advance to play-offs
4	Lietkabelis	36	20	16	3013	2978	+35	Advance to play-offs
5	Šiauliai	36	16	20	2886	2941	−55	Advance to play-offs
6	Pieno žvaigždės	36	14	22	2894	3140	−246	Advance to play-offs
7	Juventus	36	13	23	2918	3029	−111	Advance to play-offs
8	Nevėžis	36	12	24	2805	2993	−188	Advance to play-offs
9	Dzūkija	36	10	26	2721	3030	−309	
10	Vytautas (Note: If other 9 LKL teams and Vytis from National Basketball League (NKL) meet the licensing requirements, Vytautas would be relegated. However, Vytis did not meet licensing requirements, meaning Vytautas stayed onto the LKL for at least another season.)	36	8	28	2805	3125	−320	Relegation to NKL

Source: LKL

== Play-offs ==
The quarter-finals are played in a best-of-five format, with the higher seeded team playing the first, third and (if necessary) fifth game at home. The semi-finals are played in a best-of-five format and the finals in a best-of-seven format, with the higher seed team playing games 1, 3, 5 and 7 (if necessary) at home.

=== Bracket ===
Quarterfinals
1 Žalgiris	3
8 Nevėžis	0
4 Lietkabelis	3
5 Šiauliai	1
2 Lietuvos rytas	3
7 Juventus	0
3 Neptūnas	3
6 Pieno žvaigždės	1

Semifinals
1 Žalgiris	3
4 Lietkabelis	0
2 Lietuvos rytas	3
3 Neptūnas	2

Finals
1 Žalgiris	4
2 Lietuvos rytas	1
Third place series
3 Neptūnas	3
4 Lietkabelis	1

=== Quarterfinals ===
Team 1	Series	Team 2	Game 1	Game 2	Game 3	Game 4	Game 5
Žalgiris	3–0	Nevėžis	95–70	96–75	84–69		
Lietuvos rytas	3–0	Juventus	97–64	79–78	102–73		
Neptūnas	3–1	Pieno žvaigždės	91–81	87–92	92–82	101–64	
Lietkabelis	3–1	Šiauliai	103–86	84–94	92–68	85–84	

=== Semifinals ===
Team 1	Series	Team 2	Game 1	Game 2	Game 3	Game 4	Game 5
Žalgiris	3–0	Lietkabelis	93–69	94–79	83–64		
Lietuvos rytas	3–2	Neptūnas	79–84	67–49	74–67	70–74	88–82

=== Third place series ===
Team 1	Series	Team 2	Game 1	Game 2	Game 3	Game 4	Game 5
Neptūnas	3–1	Lietkabelis	69–83	71–69	79–71	89–78	

=== Finals ===
Team 1	Series	Team 2	Game 1	Game 2	Game 3	Game 4	Game 5	Game 6	Game 7
Žalgiris	4–1	Lietuvos rytas	96–83	73–82	90–80	82–78	80–70		

== Attendance data ==
Attendance data included playoff games:

Pos	Team	Total	High	Low	Average	Change
1	Žalgiris	105,384	11,293	1,374	4,215	+5.3%
2	Lietuvos rytas	96,239	9,830	830	3,850	+60.2%
3	Neptūnas	88,230	5,490	2,100	3,676	−15.3%
4	Lietkabelis	79,784	6,419	2,488	3,469	−6.8%
5	Šiauliai	48,300	5,200	1,000	2,415	+78.6%
6	Dzūkija	32,512	3,764	415	1,806	+1.1%
7	Juventus	28,388	3,128	864	1,494	+3.3%
8	Nevėžis	18,111	1,800	550	953	+7.8%
9	Vytautas	14,235	1,500	300	791	+10.6%
10	Pieno žvaigždės	11,623	1,100	200	581	−3.8%
	League total	522,806	11,293	200	2,478	+8.4%

Source: LKL

== Awards ==
=== Player of the month ===
Month	Player	Team	PIR	Source
2017
September	(Colombia) Juan Palacios	Neptūnas	22.7	
October	(Lithuania) Arnas Butkevičius	Neptūnas	25.5	
November	(Ukraine) Vyacheslav Bobrov	Pieno žvaigždės	28.3	
December	(Lithuania) Edgaras Želionis	Neptūnas	18.8	
2018
January	(Lithuania) Renaldas Seibutis	Neptūnas	25	
February	(United States) Lorenzo Williams	Lietkabelis	28	
March	(Lithuania) Laurynas Birutis	Šiauliai	26.4	
April	(Lithuania) Laurynas Birutis	Šiauliai	23.4	

== Clubs in European competitions ==
Team	Competition	Progress	Ref
Žalgiris	EuroLeague	Third qualified	
Lietuvos rytas	EuroCup	Top 16	
Lietkabelis	EuroCup	Regular season	
Neptūnas	Champions League	Round of 16	
Juventus	Champions League	Regular season	
Vytautas	Champions League	First qualifying round	
Nevėžis	FIBA Europe Cup	Second round	

== Clubs in regional competitions ==
Team	Competition	Progress
Pieno žvaigždės	Baltic Basketball League	Champion
Vytautas	Baltic Basketball League	Disqualified
Šiauliai	Baltic Basketball League	4th place
