= 2014 LKL Slam Dunk Contest =

The 2014 LKL Slam Dunk Contest was an event that was a part of the LKL's All-Star Day, that took place in Klaipėda's Švyturys Arena, on March 2.

== Results ==
The winner was Travis Leslie of Šiauliai. The results of the contest are documented below:

Name	Team	Height	Qualifier				Final		
Name	Team	Height	Rd 1	Rd 2	Rd 3	Total	Rd 1	Rd 2	Total
(Lithuania) Tomas Dimša	Žalgiris Kaunas	1.95 m	41	49	46	95			
(United States) Travis Leslie	Šiauliai	1.93 m	49	50	45	99	45	50	95
(Lithuania) Modestas Kumpys	Šiauliai	1.91 m	40	41	40	81			
(United States) A.J. Mathews	Juventus	2.13 m	39	36	39	78			
(Lithuania) Šarūnas Beniušis	LSU-Atletas	2.06 m	43	42	47	90			
(United States) Justin Dentmon	Žalgiris Kaunas	1.83 m	49	50	47	99	46	46	92
(Lithuania) Žydrūnas Kuodis	None	1.86 m	41	41	42	83			
Judges
(Lithuania) Darius Sirtautas (1995, 1997, 1998 champion) (Lithuania) Eurelijus Žukauskas (1999 champion) (Lithuania) Arvydas Šikšnius (2009 champion) (Lithuania) Aivaras Kiaušas (2007 champion) (United States) Zabian Dowdell
