= LKL Slam Dunk Contest =

Annual Lithuanian Basketball League (LKL) competition

Slam Dunk Contest
- Sport: Lietuvos krepšinio lyga
- Local name: Oro Karalius (Lithuanian)

History
- First award: Gary Arrington, 1994
- Most wins: Darius Sirtautas: 3 times
- Most recent: Kenny Gaines

The LKL Slam Dunk Contest was an annual Lithuanian Basketball League (LKL) competition, that was originally held during the LKL All-Star Day, and later during the King Mindaugas Cup. The contest has been held almost every year, from the first All-Star Day.

== History ==
Throughout the history of the contest, there have been witnessed many famous moments. Most noticeable being the 2001 contest, in Kaunas, where Robertas Javtokas (representing Lietuvos rytas) repeated the World Record for the highest slam dunk, when he dunked a basketball on a goal set at 3.65m (12 feet) above the floor.

The very first slam dunk contest was won by Gary Arrington, of BC Statyba, at the 1994 LKL All-Star Day, in Panevėžys. The current champion of the LKL Dunk Contest is Kenny Gaines.

== Slam Dunk Contest champions ==
Year	Player	Nationality	Team
1994 (Panevėžys)	Gary Arrington	United States	Statyba
1995 (Alytus)	Darius Sirtautas	Lithuania	Atletas
1997 (Kaunas)	Darius Sirtautas (2×)	Lithuania	Žalgiris
1998 (Vilnius)	Darius Sirtautas (3×)	Lithuania	Žalgiris
1999 (Kaunas)	Eurelijus Žukauskas	Lithuania	Žalgiris
2000 (Kaunas)	Robertas Javtokas	Lithuania	Lietuvos rytas
2001 (Kaunas)	Robertas Javtokas (2×)	Lithuania	Lietuvos rytas
2002 (Kaunas)	Dainius Šalenga	Lithuania	Žalgiris
2003 (Kaunas)	Aaron Lucas	United States	Lietuvos rytas
2004 (Kaunas)	Marco Spears	United States	Alita
2005 (Vilnius)	Antonio Grant	United States	Neptūnas
2007 (Vilnius)	Aivaras Kiaušas	Lithuania	Sakalai
2008 (Šiauliai)	Mantas Kalnietis	Lithuania	Žalgiris
2009 (Šiauliai)	Arvydas Šikšnius	Lithuania	Sakalai
2010 (Panevėžys)	Aron Baynes	Australia	Lietuvos rytas
2011 (Šiauliai)	Algirdas Palaima	Lithuania	Vilnius Pedagogical University, LSKL
2012 (Klaipėda)	Sonny Weems	United States	Žalgiris
2013 (Šiauliai)	Šarūnas Beniušis	Lithuania	LSU-Baltai
2014 (Klaipėda)	Travis Leslie	United States	Šiauliai
2015 (Vilnius)	Travis Leslie (2×)	United States	Lietuvos rytas
2016 (Vilnius)	Rafal Lipinski	Poland	Guest
2017 (Kaunas)	Gediminas Žitlinskas	Lithuania	Guest
2018 (Klaipėda)	Kenny Gaines	United States	Juventus

== See also ==
- LKL All-Star Game
- LKL All-Star Day
- LKL All-Star Game MVP
- LKL Three-point Shootout
