= 2013–14 Euroleague Top 16 Group F =

Standings and Results for Group F of the Top 16 phase of the 2013–14 Turkish Airlines Euroleague basketball tournament.

== Standings ==
Key to colors
Top four places in each group advance to Playoffs

Pos	Team	Pld	W	L	PF	PA	PD
1	(Russia) CSKA Moscow	14	12	2	1167	1035	+132
2	(Spain) Real Madrid	14	11	3	1190	1047	+143
3	(Israel) Maccabi Tel Aviv	14	8	6	1115	1090	+25
4	(Turkey) Galatasaray	14	7	7	1072	1065	+7
5	(Russia) Lokomotiv Kuban	14	7	7	1081	1098	−17
6	(Germany) Bayern Munich	14	5	9	1040	1102	−62
7	(Serbia) Partizan	14	4	10	953	1069	−116
8	(Lithuania) Žalgiris	14	2	12	1062	1174	−112

Tiebreakers

- Galatasaray and Lokomotiv Kuban are ranked on head-to-head record.

	Team	Pld	W	L	PF	PA	Diff
1.	(Turkey) Galatasaray Liv Hospital	2	1	1	129	129	+7
2.	(Russia) Lokomotiv Kuban	2	1	1	129	129	-17

== Fixtures and results ==
All times given below are in Central European Time.

=== Game 1 ===
2 January 2014
18:45

Boxscore

Galatasaray Liv Hospital (Turkey)	84–90	(Israel) Maccabi Tel Aviv
Scoring by quarter: 23–25, 24–15, 18–23, 19–27
Pts: Arroyo 19; Rebs: Mensah-Bonsu 9 Asts: Arroyo 4		Pts: Hickman 24; Rebs: Tyus 11; Asts: Pnini 4

Abdi İpekçi Arena, Istanbul
Attendance: 10,411
Referees: Milivoje Jovcic (SRB), Juan Carlos Garcia Gonzalez (ESP), Elias Koromilas (GRE)

2 January 2014
19:00

Boxscore

Partizan NIS (Serbia)	64–80	(Spain) Real Madrid
Scoring by quarter: 17–29, 22–18, 10–11, 15–22
Pts: Kinsey 17; Rebs: Lauvergne 13; Asts: Bogdanović, Kinsey 3		Pts: Fernández, Rodríguez 16; Rebs: Bourousis 10; Asts: Rodríguez 5

Kombank Arena, Belgrade
Attendance: 21,374
Referees: Grzegorz Ziemblicki (POL), Recep Ankarali (TUR), Panagiotis Anastopoulos (GRE)

3 January 2014
14:00

Boxscore

Lokomotiv Kuban (Russia)	77–84 (OT)	(Russia) CSKA Moscow
Scoring by quarter: 22–24, 22–17, 12–16, 15–14, Overtime: 6–13
Pts: Likhodey, Brown 13; Rebs: Marić 10; Asts: Williams 8		Pts: Teodosić 16; Rebs: Khryapa 8 Asts: Khryapa 7

Basket-Hall, Krasnodar
Attendance: 6,233
Referees: Sasa Pukl (SLO), Spiros Gkontas (GRE), Marcin Kowalski (POL)

3 January 2014
18:45

Boxscore

Žalgiris (Lithuania)	66–84	(Germany) Bayern Munich
Scoring by quarter: 10–15, 26–33, 12–24, 18–12
Pts: Dentmon 12; Rebs: Javtokas 8 Asts: Jasikevičius 5		Pts: Delaney 14; Rebs: Thompson 7 Asts: Delaney 6

Žalgiris Arena, Kaunas
Attendance: 12,000
Referees: Luigi Lamonica (ITA), Roberto Chiari (ITA), Oscar Perea (ESP)

=== Game 2 ===
9 January 2014
20:05

Boxscore

Maccabi Tel Aviv (Israel)	85–75	(Russia) Lokomotiv Kuban
Scoring by quarter: 21–21, 24–17, 19–24, 21–13
Pts: Schortsanitis 22; Rebs: Smith 12; Asts: Pnini, Rice 6		Pts: Kalnietis 18; Rebs: Hendrix 9 Asts: Kalnietis 8

Nokia Arena, Tel Aviv
Attendance: 10,728
Referees: Christos Christodoulou (GRE), Recep Ankarali (TUR), Sasa Maricic (SRB)

9 January 2014
20:15

Boxscore

Bayern Munich (Germany)	71–65	(Serbia) Partizan NIS
Scoring by quarter: 17-20, 17-22, 18-14, 19-9
Pts: Bryant 16; Rebs: Bryant 12; Asts: Delaney 5		Pts: Bogdanović 24; Rebs: Kinsey 8 Asts: Bogdanović 5

Audi Dome, Munich
Attendance: 5,510
Referees: Vicente Bulto (ESP), Emilio Perez Pizarro (ESP), Elias Koromilas (GRE).

10 January 2014
17:00

Boxscore

CSKA Moscow (Russia)	77–62	(Lithuania) Žalgiris
Scoring by quarter: 22–14, 15–17, 25–13, 15–18
Pts: Fridzon 15; Rebs: Krstić 6 Asts: Weems 5		Pts: Dentmon 22; Rebs: Jankūnas 8 Asts: four players 2

Universal Sports Hall, Moscow
Attendance: 4,307
Referees: Miguel Perez Perez (ESP), Sinisa Herceg (CRO), Rustu Nuran (TUR)

10 January 2014
20:45

Boxscore

Real Madrid (Spain)	89–84	(Turkey) Galatasaray Liv Hospital
Scoring by quarter: 20–19, 25–14, 21–19, 23–32
Pts: Carroll 15; Rebs: Darden 10; Asts: Rodríguez 4		Pts: Erceg 24; Rebs: Mačvan 11; Asts: Arroyo 10

Palacio de Deportes, Madrid
Attendance: 11,347
Referees: Sreten Radovic (CRO), Fernando Rocha (POR), Milija Vojinovic (SRB)

=== Game 3 ===
15 January 2014
21:00 CET

Boxscore

Real Madrid (Spain)	111–87	(Germany) Bayern Munich
Scoring by quarter: 17–24, 31–23, 41–21, 22–19
Pts: Fernández 24; Rebs: Bourousis 7 Asts: Rodríguez 7		Pts: Delaney 22; Rebs: Savović 6 Asts: Delaney 6

Palacio de Deportes, Madrid
Attendance: 8,019
Referees: Guerrino Cerebuch (ITA), Gianluca Mattioli (ITA), Tomasz Trawicki (POL)

16 January 2014
18:45

Boxscore

Žalgiris (Lithuania)	78–87	(Israel) Maccabi Tel Aviv
Scoring by quarter: 25–19, 21–19, 17–25, 15–24
Pts: Dentmon, Jankūnas 21; Rebs: Dentmon 6 Asts: Dentmon 10		Pts: Rice 20; Rebs: Smith 8 Asts: Ohayon 11

Žalgiris Arena, Kaunas
Attendance: 9,879
Referees: Juan Carlos Arteaga (ESP), Sreten Radovic (SRB), Benjamin Jimenez (ESP)

16 January 2014
20:45

Boxscore

Galatasaray Liv Hospital (Turkey)	62–63	(Russia) Lokomotiv Kuban
Scoring by quarter: 20–12, 15–20, 16–19, 11–12
Pts: Arroyo 19; Rebs: Mensah-Bonsu 7 Asts: Arroyo 6		Pts: Brown 16; Rebs: Hendrix, Marić 5 Asts: Bykov 4

Abdi İpekçi Arena, Istanbul
Attendance: 6,196
Referees: Luigi Lamonica (ITA), Matej Boltauzer (SLO), Panagiotis Anastopoulos (GRE)

17 January 2014
20:45

Boxscore

Partizan NIS (Serbia)	73–72	(Russia) CSKA Moscow
Scoring by quarter: 15–14, 19–21, 16–15, 23–22
Pts: Bogdanović 27; Rebs: Lauvergne 8 Asts: Kinsey, Gagić 2		Pts: Krstić 27; Rebs: Krstić 7 Asts: Weems 10

Kombank Arena, Belgrade
Attendance: 16,523
Referees: José Martín (ESP), Tolga Sahin (ITA), Petros Papapetrou (GRE)

=== Game 4 ===
23 January 2014
17:45

Boxscore

CSKA Moscow (Russia)	85–71	(Spain) Real Madrid
Scoring by quarter: 23–10, 17–20, 19–25, 26–16
Pts: Krstić 18; Rebs: Khryapa, Krstić 6 Asts: Khryapa 9		Pts: Rodríguez 19; Rebs: Bourousis 8 Asts: Lull 4

Universal Sports Hall, Moscow
Attendance: 5,094
Referees: Christos Christodoulou (GRE), Robert Lottermoser (GER), Olegs Latisevs (LAT)

23 January 2014
20:05

Boxscore

Maccabi Tel Aviv (Israel)	88–67	(Serbia) Partizan NIS
Scoring by quarter: 20-11, 27-8, 21-28, 20-20
Pts: Tyus 16; Rebs: Tyus 9 Asts: Rice, Ingles 5		Pts: Bogdanović, Kinsey 17; Rebs: Kinsey 8 Asts: Bogdanović 3

Nokia Arena, Tel Aviv
Attendance: 10,728
Referees: Dani Hierrezuelo (ESP), Antonio Conde (ESP), Rustu Nuran (TUR)

23 January 2014
20:15

Boxscore

Bayern Munich (Germany)	66–72	(Turkey) Galatasaray Liv Hospital
Scoring by quarter: 18–30, 18–12, 15–19, 15–11
Pts: Delaney 12; Rebs: Idbihi 10; Asts: Delaney 3		Pts: Arroyo 21; Rebs: Erceg 10; Asts: three players 2

Audi Dome, Munich
Attendance: 6,180
Referees: Borys Ryzhyk (UKR), Spiros Gkontas (GRE), Nicola Maestre (FRA)

24 January 2014
17:00

Boxscore

Lokomotiv Kuban (Russia)	80–75	(Lithuania) Žalgiris
Scoring by quarter: 16–29, 23–22, 19–14, 22–10
Pts: Simon 21; Rebs: Simon 6 Asts: Simon 8		Pts: Javtokas 16; Rebs: Dentmon, Pocius 5 Asts: Dentmon 11

Basket-Hall, Krasnodar
Attendance: 4,304
Referees: Juan Carlos Garcia Gonzalez (ESP), Vicente Bulto (ESP),

=== Game 5 ===
30 January 2014
20:15

Boxscore

Bayern Munich (Germany)	61–86	(Russia) CSKA Moscow
Scoring by quarter: 14–23, 9–17, 20–22, 18–24
Pts: Delaney 16; Rebs: Idbihi 6 Asts: three players 2		Pts: Teodosić 24; Rebs: Hines, Krstić 6 Asts: Pargo, Teodosić 5

Audi Dome, Munich
Attendance: 5,011
Referees: Dani Hierrenzuelo (ESP), Eddie Viator (FRA), Oscar Perea (ESP)

30 January 2014
20:45

Boxscore

Real Madrid (Spain)	74–68	(Israel) Maccabi Tel Aviv
Scoring by quarter: 19–20, 20–15, 17–22, 18–11
Pts: Llull 20; Rebs: Fernández 8 Asts: Llull 4		Pts: Pnini, Schortsanitis 15; Rebs: Schortsanitis 5 Asts: Ohayon 4

Palacio de Deportes, Madrid
Attendance: 11,814
Referees: Sasa Pukl (SLO), Srdan Dozai (CRO), Roberto Chiari (ITA)

31 January 2014
19:00

Boxscore

Galatasaray Liv Hospital (Turkey)	90–83	(Lithuania) Žalgiris
Scoring by quarter: 17–25, 23–10, 25–22, 25–26
Pts: Arroyo 22; Rebs: Erceg 8 Asts: Arroyo 9		Pts: Pocius 26; Rebs: Javtokas 9 Asts: Dentmon 7

Abdi İpekçi Arena, Istanbul
Attendance: 7,157
Referees: Jose Ramon Garcia Ortiz (ESP), Antonio Conde (ESP), Tomasz Trawicki (POL)

31 January 2014
20:45

Boxscore

Partizan NIS (Serbia)	81–87	(Russia) Lokomotiv Kuban
Scoring by quarter: 18–20, 20–23, 22–20, 21–24
Pts: Kinsey 32; Rebs: 3 players 6 Asts: Bogdanović 5		Pts: Simon 18; Rebs: Hendrix 7 Asts: Kalnietis 5

Kombank Arena, Belgrade
Attendance: 15,565
Referees: Robert Lottermoser (GER), Joseph Bissang (FRA), Benjamin Jimenez (ESP)

=== Game 6 ===
13 February 2014
17:00

Boxscore

Lokomotiv Kuban (Russia)	74–78	(Spain) Real Madrid
Scoring by quarter: 23–18, 13–22, 18–18, 20–20
Pts: Brown 21; Rebs: Hendrix 10; Asts: Kalnietis 7		Pts: Rodríguez 16; Rebs: Mirotić 9 Asts: Llull 5

Basket-Hall, Krasnodar
Attendance: 7,470
Referees: Milivoje Jovicic (SRB), Borys Ryzhyk (UKR), Elias Koromilas (GRE)

13 February 2014
20:05

Boxscore

Maccabi Tel Aviv (Israel)	66–64	(Germany) Bayern Munich
Scoring by quarter: 22–21, 17–18, 13–11, 14–14
Pts: Hickman, Blu 14; Rebs: Smith 8 Asts: Hickman 4		Pts: Đedović 14; Rebs: Benzing, Delaney 5 Asts: Delaney 5

Nokia Arena, Tel Aviv
Attendance: 10,728
Referees: José Martín (ESP), Grzegorz Ziemblicki (POL), Marcin Kowalski (POL)

13 February 2014
20:15

Boxscore

Žalgiris (Lithuania)	89–77	(Serbia) Partizan NIS
Scoring by quarter: 29–16, 29–25, 19–18, 12–18
Pts: Dentmon 23; Rebs: Jankūnas, Dentmon 5 Asts: Pocius 7		Pts: Bogdanović 24; Rebs: Lauvergne 7 Asts: Bogdanović 5

Žalgiris Arena, Kaunas
Attendance: 8,150
Referees: Miguel Perez (ESP), Spiros Gkontas (GRE), Carmelo Paternico (ITA)

14 February 2014
19:30

Boxscore

Galatasaray Liv Hospital (Turkey)	71–74	(Russia) CSKA Moscow
Scoring by quarter: 21–23, 16–17, 21–16, 13–18
Pts: Arslan 19; Rebs: Mensah-Bonsu 12; Asts: Arroyo 9		Pts: Krstić 24; Rebs: Hines 11; Asts: Jackson 7

Abdi İpekçi Arena, Istanbul
Attendance: 11,400
Referees: Ilija Belošević (SRB), Vicente Bulto (ESP), Boris Shulga (UKR)

=== Game 7 ===
20 February 2014
20:45

Boxscore

Partizan NIS (Serbia)	70–78	(Turkey) Galatasaray Liv Hospital
Scoring by quarter: 26–22, 11–21, 16–19, 17–16
Pts: Bogdanović 23; Rebs: Lauvergne 15; Asts: Bogdanović 6		Pts: Domercant 18; Rebs: Mensah-Bonsu, Mačvan 7 Asts: Arslan 6

Kombank Arena, Belgrade
Attendance: 13,552
Referees: José Martín (ESP), Juan Carlos Garcia Gonzalez (ESP), Eddie Viator (FRA)

21 January 2014
17:00

Boxscore

CSKA Moscow (Russia)	100–65	(Israel) Maccabi Tel Aviv
Scoring by quarter: 26–21, 21–19, 24–12, 29–13
Pts: Teodosić 22; Rebs: Khryapa 10; Asts: Khryapa, Teodosić 8		Pts: Ingles 13; Rebs: Ingles 6 Asts: Ingles 6

Universal Sports Hall, Moscow
Attendance: 4,827
Referees: Juan Carlos Arteaga (ESP), Milivoje Jovcic (SRB), Emilio Perez Pizarro (ESP)

21 February 2014
20:15

Boxscore

Bayern Munich (Germany)	82–79	(Russia) Lokomotiv Kuban
Scoring by quarter: 14–30, 26–20, 22–15, 20–14
Pts: Delaney 18; Rebs: Bryant 7 Asts: Schaffartzik 4		Pts: Simon 19; Rebs: Hendrix 12; Asts: Kalnietis, Simon 4

Audi Dome, Munich
Attendance: 5,713
Referees: Luigi Lamonica (ITA), Recep Ankarali (TUR), Carlos Cortes (ESP)

21 February 2014
20:45

Boxscore

Real Madrid (Spain)	108–72	(Lithuania) Žalgiris
Scoring by quarter: 34–21, 26–16, 32–13, 16–22
Pts: Fernández 20; Rebs: Mejri 9 Asts: Rodríguez, Llull 9		Pts: Dentmon 21; Rebs: Dentmon 6 Asts: Dentmon 4

Palacio de Deportes, Madrid
Attendance: 11,408
Referees: Matej Boltauzer (SLO), Murat Biricik (TUR), Ioannis Foufis (GRE)

=== Game 8 ===
27 February 2014
20:45

Boxscore

Maccabi Tel Aviv (Israel)	97–81	(Turkey) Galatasaray Liv Hospital
Scoring by quarter: 23-23, 26-15, 21-18, 27-25
Pts: Pnini 17; Rebs: Blu 5 Asts: Hickman 7		Pts: Hairston 18; Rebs: Aldemir 11; Asts: Arroyo 7

Nokia Arena, Tel Aviv
Attendance: 10,728
Referees: Guerrino Cerebuch (ITA), Jakub Zamojski (POL), Oscar Perea (ESP)

28 February 2014
17:00

Boxscore

CSKA Moscow (Russia)	94–93	(Russia) Lokomotiv Kuban
Scoring by quarter: 29–18, 19–22, 20–28, 26–25
Pts: Teodosić 25; Rebs: Hines 7 Asts: Weems 4		Pts: Brown 23; Rebs: three players 5 Asts: Kalnietis 8

Universal Sports Hall, Moscow
Attendance: 4,201
Referees: Sreten Radovic (CRO), Tolga Sahin (ITA), Carmelo Paternico (ITA)

27 February 2014
20:15

Boxscore

Bayern Munich (Germany)	79–73	(Lithuania) Žalgiris
Scoring by quarter: 20–24, 18–16, 14–19, 27–14
Pts: Taylor 22; Rebs: Bryant 11; Asts: Delaney 6		Pts: Javtokas 18; Rebs: Jankūnas 9 Asts: Jankūnas, Jasikevičius 4

Audi Dome, Munich
Attendance: 6,122
Referees: Christos Christodoulou (GRE), Panagiotis Anastopoulos (GRE), Benjamin Jimenez (ESP)

27 February 2014
20:45

Boxscore

Real Madrid (Spain)	80–57	(Serbia) Partizan NIS
Scoring by quarter: 22–17, 24–10, 15–13, 19–17
Pts: Llull, Rodríguez 19; Rebs: Bourousis 8 Asts: Fernández 8		Pts: Pavlović, Bogdanović 10; Rebs: Bogdanović 7 Asts: Tepić 4

Palacio de Deportes, Madrid
Attendance: 11,298
Referees: Luigi Lamonica (ITA), Nicolas Maestre (FRA), Marcin Kowalski (POL)

=== Game 9 ===
6 March 2014
18:45

Boxscore

Žalgiris (Lithuania)	86–88	(Russia) CSKA Moscow
Scoring by quarter: 22–23, 16–24, 26–18, 22–23
Pts: Dentmon 28; Rebs: Pocius 6 Asts: Jasikevičius 4		Pts: Teodosić 16; Rebs: Vorontsevich 7 Asts: Khryapa 8

Žalgiris Arena, Kaunas
Attendance: 9,675
Referees: Guerrino Cerebuch (ITA), Borys Ryzhyk (UKR), Antonio Conde (ESP)

6 March 2014
20:45

Boxscore

Partizan NIS (Serbia)	70–55	(Germany) Bayern Munich
Scoring by quarter: 19–9, 25–19, 16–17, 10–10
Pts: Kinsey, Pavlović 21; Rebs: Lauvergne 10; Asts: Tepić 5		Pts: Đedović 12; Rebs: Delaney 8 Asts: Delaney, Hamann 3

Kombank Arena, Belgrade
Attendance: 11,550
Referees: Juan Arteaga (ESP), Paolo Taurino (ITA), Olegs Latisevs (LAT)

7 March 2014
17:00

Boxscore

Lokomotiv Kuban (Russia)	78–76	(Israel) Maccabi Tel Aviv
Scoring by quarter: 15–13, 23–16, 15–19, 25–28
Pts: Simon 23; Rebs: Hendrix, Marić 7 Asts: Williams 6		Pts: Schortsanitis 18; Rebs: Ingles 6 Asts: Ingles 6

Basket-Hall, Krasnodar
Attendance: 6,012
Referees: Ilija Belosevic (SRB), Dani Hierrenzuelo (ESP), Petar Obradovic (BIH)

7 March 2014
19:00

Boxscore

Galatasaray Liv Hospital (Turkey)	74–85	(Spain) Real Madrid
Scoring by quarter: 16–20, 22–23, 14–18, 22–24
Pts: Erceg 18; Rebs: Aldemir, Mačvan 6 Asts: Carlos Arroyo 8		Pts: Mirotić 18; Rebs: Reyes 6 Asts: Rodríguez 7

Abdi İpekçi Arena, Istanbul
Attendance: 11,400
Referees: Christos Christodoulou (GRE), Srdan Dozai (CRO), Marek Cmikiewicz (POL)

=== Game 10 ===
13 March 2014
17:00

Boxscore

CSKA Moscow (Russia)	84–52	(Serbia) Partizan NIS
Scoring by quarter: 16–15, 22–7, 32–19, 14–11
Pts: Fridzon, Kaun 13; Rebs: Micov 5 Asts: Jackson 5		Pts: Lauvergne 17; Rebs: Lauvergne 5 Asts: Tepić 2

CSKA Universal Sports Hall, Moscow
Attendance: 4,523
Referees: Dani Hierrenzuelo (ESP), Elias Koromilas (GRE), Sergiy Zashchuk (UKR)

13 March 2014
20:05

Boxscore

Maccabi Tel Aviv (Israel)	77–67	(Lithuania) Žalgiris
Scoring by quarter: 20–20, 20–13, 17–14, 20–20
Pts: Rice 19; Rebs: Smith 8 Asts: Rice 6		Pts: Dentmon 14; Rebs: Javtokas 9 Asts: Dentmon, Pocius 3

Nokia Arena, Tel Aviv
Attendance: 10,728
Referees: José Martín (ESP), Spiros Gkontas (GRE), Rustu Nuran (TUR)

13 March 2014
20:45

Boxscore

Bayern Munich (Germany)	85–83	(Spain) Real Madrid
Scoring by quarter: 20–19, 14–23, 22–18, 29–23
Pts: Đedović 21; Rebs: Savović 9 Asts: Delaney 6		Pts: Rodríguez 18; Rebs: Mirotić 7 Asts: Rodríguez 4

Audi Dome, Munich
Attendance: 6,700
Referees: Fernando Rocha (POR), Tolga Sahin (ITA), Roberto Chiari (ITA)

14 March 2014
17:00

Boxscore

Lokomotiv Kuban (Russia)	66–67	(Turkey) Galatasaray Liv Hospital
Scoring by quarter: 15–22, 14–10, 19–16, 18–19
Pts: Brown 19; Rebs: Zhukanenko 6 Asts: Kalnietis 7		Pts: Markoishvili 19; Rebs: Erceg, Mensah-Bonsu 6 Asts: Arroyo, Erceg 4

Basket-Hall, Krasnodar
Attendance: 6,215
Referees: Sasa Pukl (SLO), Paolo Taurino (ITA), Damir Javor (SLO)

=== Game 11 ===
20 March 2014
18:45

Boxscore

Žalgiris (Lithuania)	85–86	(Russia) Lokomotiv Kuban
Scoring by quarter: 22–23, 19–27, 20–15, 24–21
Pts: Javtokas 18; Rebs: Javtokas 9 Asts: Jasikevičius 9		Pts: Brown, Hendrix 15; Rebs: Brown 9 Asts: Jasaitis, Simon 4

Žalgiris Arena, Kaunas
Attendance: 9,125
Referees: Milivoje Jovcic (SRB), Miguel Perez Perez (ESP), Carlos Cortes (ESP)

20 March 2014
20:45

Boxscore

Partizan NIS (Serbia)	72–70	(Israel) Maccabi Tel Aviv
Scoring by quarter: 14–23, 17–17, 16–17, 25–13
Pts: Bogdanović 18; Rebs: Lauvergne 12; Asts: Bogdanović 6		Pts: Tyus 14; Rebs: Tyus 11; Asts: Ohayon 4

Kombank Arena, Belgrade
Attendance: 13,015
Referees: Borys Ryzhyk (UKR), Tolga Sahin (ITA), Emilio Perez Pizarro (ESP)

20 March 2014
20:45

Boxscore

Real Madrid (Spain)	93–79	(Russia) CSKA Moscow
Scoring by quarter: 24–24, 18–17, 24–20, 27–18
Pts: Fernández 28; Rebs: Mirotić, Reyes 5 Asts: Rodríguez 8		Pts: Weems 28; Rebs: Khryapa 7 Asts: Weems 6

Palacio de Deportes, Madrid
Attendance: 13,192
Referees: Ilija Belosevic (SRB), Robert Lottermoser (GER), Panagiotis Anastopoulos (GRE)

21 March 2014
19:00

Boxscore

Galatasaray Liv Hospital (Turkey)	76–69	(Germany) Bayern Munich
Scoring by quarter: 21–20, 21–14, 18–20, 16–15
Pts: Arroyo 16; Rebs: Mensah-Bonsu 5 Asts: Arroyo 11		Pts: Delaney 16; Rebs: Bryant 7 Asts: Schaffartzik 5

Abdi İpekçi Arena, Istanbul
Attendance: 10,200
Referees: Dani Hierrenzuelo (ESP), Vicente Bulto (ESP), Elias Koromilas (GRE)

=== Game 12 ===
27 March 2014
16:45

Boxscore

CSKA Moscow (Russia)	77–70	(Germany) Bayern Munich
Scoring by quarter: 23–19, 15–15, 28–15, 11–21
Pts: Weems 15; Rebs: Hines 7 Asts: Khryapa 6		Pts: Thompson 14; Rebs: Troutman 7 Asts: Bryant, Hamann 4

CSKA Universal Sports Hall, Moscow
Attendance: 4,723
Referees: José Martín (ESP), Spiros Gkontas (GRE), Emilio Perez Pizarro (ESP)

27 March 2014
18:45

Boxscore

Žalgiris (Lithuania)	72–84	(Turkey) Galatasaray Liv Hospital
Scoring by quarter: 12–20, 23–18, 22–28, 15–18
Pts: Dentmon 19; Rebs: Jankūnas 8 Asts: Jankūnas 4		Pts: Arroyo 19; Rebs: Aldemir 14; Asts: Arroyo 7

Žalgiris Arena, Kaunas
Attendance: 8,659
Referees: Ilija Belosevic (SRB), Eddie Viator (FRA), Olegs Latisevs (LAT)

27 March 2014
20:05

Boxscore

Maccabi Tel Aviv (Israel)	76–77	(Spain) Real Madrid
Scoring by quarter: 15–20, 28–20, 14–22, 19–15
Pts: Smith 23; Rebs: Tyus 11; Asts: Ingles, Pnini 4		Pts: Rodríguez 21; Rebs: Bourousis 10; Asts: Lull 6

Nokia Arena, Tel Aviv
Attendance: 10,728
Referees: Luigi Lamonica (ITA), Recep Ankarali (TUR), Matej Boltauzer (SLO)

28 March 2014
17:00

Boxscore

Lokomotiv Kuban (Russia)	84–73	(Serbia) Partizan NIS
Scoring by quarter: 16–10, 22–20, 25–15, 21–28
Pts: Brown 18; Rebs: Jasaitis 7 Asts: Kalnietis 8		Pts: Bertāns 20; Rebs: Lauvergne 7 Asts: Bogdanović 5

Basket-Hall, Krasnodar
Attendance: 5,185
Referees: Guerrino Cerebuch (ITA), Joseph Bissang (FRA), Marcin Kowalski (POL)

=== Game 13 ===
3 April 2014
20:45

Boxscore

Bayern Munich (Germany)	92–94	(Israel) Maccabi Tel Aviv
Scoring by quarter: 32–32, 26–22, 13–20, 21–20
Pts: Taylor 22; Rebs: Delaney 7 Asts: Delaney 8		Pts: Rice 18; Rebs: Tyus 9 Asts: Rice 5

Audi Dome, Munich
Attendance: 6,700
Referees: Christos Christodoulou (GRE), Eddie Viator (FRA), Juan Carlos Garcia Gonzalez (ESP)

4 March 2014
18:00

Boxscore

CSKA Moscow (Russia)	86–85 (OT)	(Turkey) Galatasaray Liv Hospital
Scoring by quarter: 20–24, 18–14, 13–14, 16–15, Overtime: 19–18
Pts: Kaun 14; Rebs: Khryapa 9 Asts: Fridzon, Khryapa 4		Pts: Erceg 35; Rebs: Erceg 9 Asts: Arroyo 8

Universal Sports Hall, Moscow
Attendance: 4,758
Referees: Milivoje Jovcic (SRB), Antonio Conde (ESP), Marek Cmikiewicz (POL)

4 April 2014
20:45

Boxscore

Real Madrid (Spain)	81–55	(Russia) Lokomotiv Kuban
Scoring by quarter: 19–8, 27–16, 17–17, 18–14
Pts: Reyes 15; Rebs: Bourousis 8 Asts: Rodríguez 7		Pts: Hendrix 17; Rebs: Hendrix 9 Asts: Williams 4

Palacio de Deportes, Madrid
Attendance: 9,731
Referees: Borys Ryzhyk (UKR), Spiros Gkontas (GRE), Srdan Dozai (CRO)

4 April 2014
20:45

Boxscore

Partizan NIS (Serbia)	77–67	(Lithuania) Žalgiris
Scoring by quarter: 24–13, 17–21, 18–15, 18–18
Pts: Bertāns 17; Rebs: Bertāns 10; Asts: three players 4		Pts: Gudaitis 13; Rebs: Klimavičius 8 Asts: Klimavičius 8

Kombank Arena, Belgrade
Attendance: 12,505
Referees: Recep Ankarali (TUR), Roberto Chiari (ITA), Panagiotis Anastopoulos (GRE)

=== Game 14 ===
10 April 2014
18:00

Boxscore

Lokomotiv Kuban (Russia)	84–75	(Germany) Bayern Munich
Scoring by quarter: 21–16, 25–17, 19–17, 19–25
Pts: Brown, Simon 18; Rebs: Hendrix 8 Asts: Kalnietis 4		Pts: Đedović 16; Rebs: Troutman 7 Asts: Schaffartzik 4

Basket-Hall, Krasnodar
Attendance: 6,537
Referees: Dani Hierrenzuelo (ESP), Antonio Conde (ESP), Petros Papapetrou (GRE)

10 April 2014
20:05

Boxscore

Maccabi Tel Aviv (Israel)	76–81	(Russia) CSKA Moscow
Scoring by quarter: 17–23, 28–19, 18–17, 13–22
Pts: Rice 15; Rebs: Schortsanitis 5 Asts: Rice 7		Pts: Jackson 18; Rebs: Weems, Jackson 5 Asts: Krstić 4

Nokia Arena, Tel Aviv
Attendance: 10,728
Referees: Sasa Pukl (SLO), Sreten Radovic (CRO), Olegs Latisevs (LAT)

11 April 2014
18:45

Boxscore

Žalgiris (Lithuania)	87–80	(Spain) Real Madrid
Scoring by quarter: 18-18, 18-20, 21-21, 30-21
Pts: Dentmon 36; Rebs: Jankūnas 7 Asts: three players 3		Pts: Llull 23; Rebs: Bourousis 4 Asts: Rodríguez 5

Žalgiris Arena, Kaunas
Attendance: 8,345
Referees: Fernando Rocha (POR), Paolo Taurino (ITA), Milija Vojinovic (SRB)

11 April 2014
19:00

Boxscore

Galatasaray Liv Hospital (Turkey)	64–55	(Serbia) Partizan NIS
Scoring by quarter: 16-13, 24-15, 14-14, 10-13
Pts: Markoishvili 16; Rebs: Aldemir 7 Asts: Arroyo 7		Pts: three players 11; Rebs: Lauvergne 11; Asts: Bogdanović 4

Abdi İpekçi Arena, Istanbul
Attendance: 11,470
Referees: José Martín (ESP), Carmelo Paternico (ITA), Boris Shulga (UKR)
