= 2012 LKL Slam Dunk Contest =

The 2012 LKL Slam Dunk Contest, was an event that was a part of the LKL's All-Star Day, that took place in Klaipėda's Švyturys Arena, on March 3. The winner of this event was Sonny Weems, of Žalgiris.

== Results ==
The results of this contest are documented below:

Name	Team	Height	Qualifier				Final		
Name	Team	Height	Rd 1	Rd 2	Rd 3	Total	Rd 1	Rd 2	Total
(United States) Enrico Pickett	Naglis Palanga	1.93 m	DNP						
(Lithuania) Adomas Drungilas	Lietkabelis	2.03 m	37	40	40	80	DNQ		
(United States) Sonny Weems	Žalgiris Kaunas	1.98 m	44	45	43	89	49	50	99
(Lithuania) Raimundas Danys	Neptūnas Klaipėda	1.98 m	41	38	40	81	43	43	86
(United States) Leroy Nobles	Pieno žvaigždės	1.95 m	39	–	39	78	DNQ		
(United States) Cam Long	Šiauliai	1.93 m	34	40	39	79	DNQ		
Judges
* Eurelijus Žukauskas * Robertas Kuncaitis * Saulius Štombergas * Lawrence Roberts * Vaidas Jurgilas
