= Kenny Gaines =

American basketball player (born 1994)

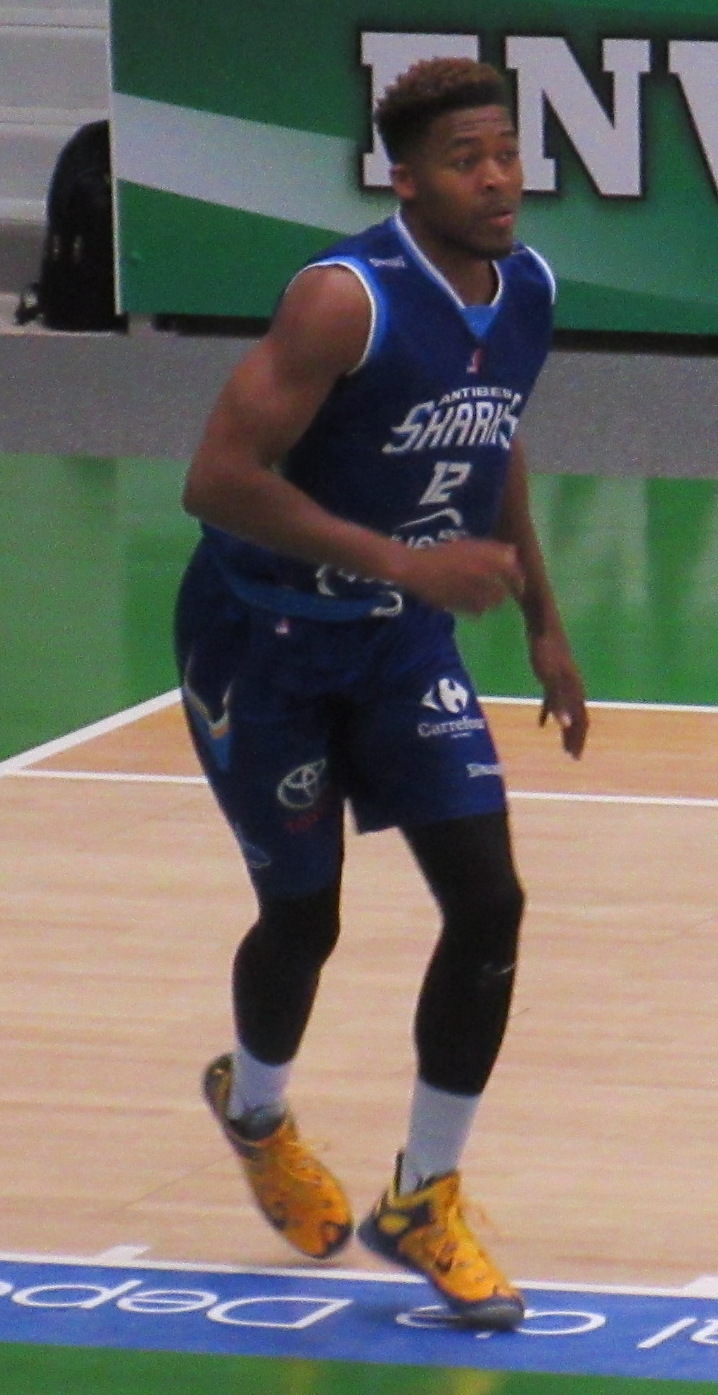
- Gaines with the Antibes Sharks in 2017

Georgia Bulldogs
- Position: Graduate assistant
- League: Southeastern Conference

Personal information
- Born: January 28, 1994 (age 32) Riverdale, Georgia
- Listed height: 6 ft 3 in (1.91 m)
- Listed weight: 207 lb (94 kg)

Career information
- High school: Whitefield Academy (Atlanta, Georgia)
- College: Georgia (2012–2016)
- NBA draft: 2016: undrafted
- Playing career: 2016–present

Career history
- 2016–2017: Antibes Sharks
- 2017–2019: Juventus Utena
- 2019–2020: Bertram Tortona
- 2020: Latina Basket

Career highlights
- LKL All-Star Day Slam Dunk Champion (2018); First-team Parade All-American (2012)

Kenneth James Gaines (born January 28, 1994) is an American former professional basketball player who currently serves as a graduate assistant coach for the Georgia Bulldogs of the Southeastern Conference (SEC).

== High school ==
Gaines attended Whitefield Academy, in Atlanta, Georgia, where he played basketball.

== College career ==
Gaines played NCAA Division I college basketball at the University of Georgia, where he played with the Georgia Bulldogs from 2012 to 2016. In his senior year, he averaged 12.8 points and 2.9 rebounds per game.

After going undrafted in the 2016 NBA draft, he joined the Houston Rockets for the 2016 NBA Summer League. In five games, he averaged 7.4 points and 2 rebounds in 13.4 minutes.

== Professional career ==
Gaines started his professional career on August 16, 2016, by signing with Antibes Sharks of the French LNB Pro A. On November 30, 2017, he signed a two-year (1+1) deal with BC Juventus of the Lithuanian Basketball League. He won the LKL Slam Dunk Contest in 2018.

On July 17, 2019, Gaines signed with Bertram Tortona of the Italian Serie A2 Basket. On January 31, 2020, he parted ways with the team.

On February 18, 2020, Gaines signed with Latina Basket of the Serie A2 Basket until the end of the season.

== Coaching career ==
On August 1, 2022, Gaines returned to Georgia Bulldogs as a graduate assistant.
