= 2009 LKL All-Star Game =

Ereliai	Vilkai
122	130
	1	2	3	4	Total
Ereliai	30	31	23	38	122
Vilkai	30	32	35	33	130
- Date: February 21, 2009
- Venue: Šiaulių arena, Šiauliai
- MVP: Chuck Eidson
- Attendance: 5,500

The 2009 LKL All-Star Game was played on February 21, 2009, at Šiaulių arena, in Šiauliai, home of BC Šiauliai. The game was the 15th annual LKL All-Star Game. It was the second time that Šiauliai had hosted the basketball showcase, after previously hosting it in 2008.

== The All-Star Game ==
LTV

February 21
7:30 p.m.

Ereliai 122, Vilkai 130
Pts: Stefhon Hannah 22; Rebs: Povilas Butkevičius 7 Asts: Stefhon Hannah 7	Pts: Nerijus Varnelis 29; Rebs: Paulius Jankūnas 9 Asts: Chuck Eidson, Gintaras Leonavičius 7 each

Šiaulių arena, Šiauliai, Lithuania

=== Rosters ===
Vilkai
Pos.	Player	Team	Total Votes
Starters
PG	(Lithuania) Gintaras Kadžiulis	Šiauliai	2,551
SG	(Lithuania) Mindaugas Lukauskis	Lietuvos Rytas	5,858
SF	(United States) Chuck Eidson	Lietuvos Rytas	4,511
PF	(Lithuania) Paulius Jankūnas	Žalgiris	6,008
C	(Lithuania) Marijonas Petravičius	Lietuvos Rytas	2,333
Reserves
PG	(Lithuania) Gintaras Leonavičius	Nevėžis	
SG	(Lithuania) Steponas Babrauskas	Lietuvos Rytas	
SG	(Lithuania) Dainius Šalenga	Žalgiris	
PF	(Lithuania) Virginijus Praškevičius	Šiauliai	
PF	(Lithuania) Nerijus Varnelis	Alytus	
PF	(Lithuania) Rolandas Matulis	Sakalai	
C	(Lithuania) Eurelijus Žukauskas	Žalgiris	

Ereliai
Pos.	Player	Team	Total Votes
Starters
PG	(Lithuania) Žygimantas Janavičius	Žalgiris	2,725
SG	(Lithuania) Mantas Kalnietis	Žalgiris	6,885
SF	(Lithuania) Artūras Jomantas	Lietuvos Rytas	2,807
PF	(Lithuania) Jonas Mačiulis	Žalgiris	7,512
C	(Lithuania) Donatas Motiejūnas	Aisčiai	8,072
Reserves
PG	(Lithuania) Martynas Mažeika	Neptūnas	
SG	(Lithuania) Marius Runkauskas	Sūduva	
PG	(United States) Stefhon Hannah	Šiauliai	
PG	(Lithuania) Vytenis Jasikevičius	Kaunas	
PF	(Lithuania) Povilas Butkevičius	Žalgiris	
SF	(Lithuania) Arvydas Šikšnius	Sakalai	
C	(Lithuania) Mindaugas Kuzminskas	Šiauliai	

=== Coaches ===
The coach for the Vilkai was Lietuvos Rytas head coach Rimas Kurtinaitis. The coach for the Ereliai was Žalgiris head coach Gintaras Krapikas.

== All-Star Weekend ==
=== Three-Point Shootout ===
Contestants
Player	Team	1st	2nd	Final
(Lithuania) Marius Kasiulevičius	Neptūnas	26	21	21
(Lithuania) Andrius Šležas	Šiauliai	23	27	14
(Lithuania) Vytenis Jasikevičius	Kaunas	21	16	
(Lithuania) Justas Sinica	Lietuvos Rytas	23	15	
(Lithuania) Tomas Rinkevičius	Aisčiai	20		
(Lithuania) Nerijus Varnelis	Alytus	20		
(Lithuania) Artūras Milaknis	Žalgiris	17		
(Lithuania) Giedrius Kurtinaitis	Aisčiai	16		
(Lithuania) Mantas Simonavičius	Sūduva	15		
(Lithuania) Povilas Šakinis	Nevėžis	14		
(Lithuania) Darius Griškėnas	Techasas	13		
(Lithuania) Arnas Labuckas	Sakalai	12		

=== Slam Dunk Contest ===
Contestants
Player	Team	Ht.
(Lithuania) Arvydas Šikšnius	BC Sakalai	6–5
(Lithuania) Raimundas Danys	Kaunas TRIOBET	6–6
(Lithuania) Vytenis Petkus	Neptūnas	6–4
(Lithuania) Paulius Knyza	Sūduva	6–3
(Lithuania) Benas Bagdonavičius	Techasas	6–6
