= Arvydas Šikšnius =

Lithuanian basketball player (born 1987)

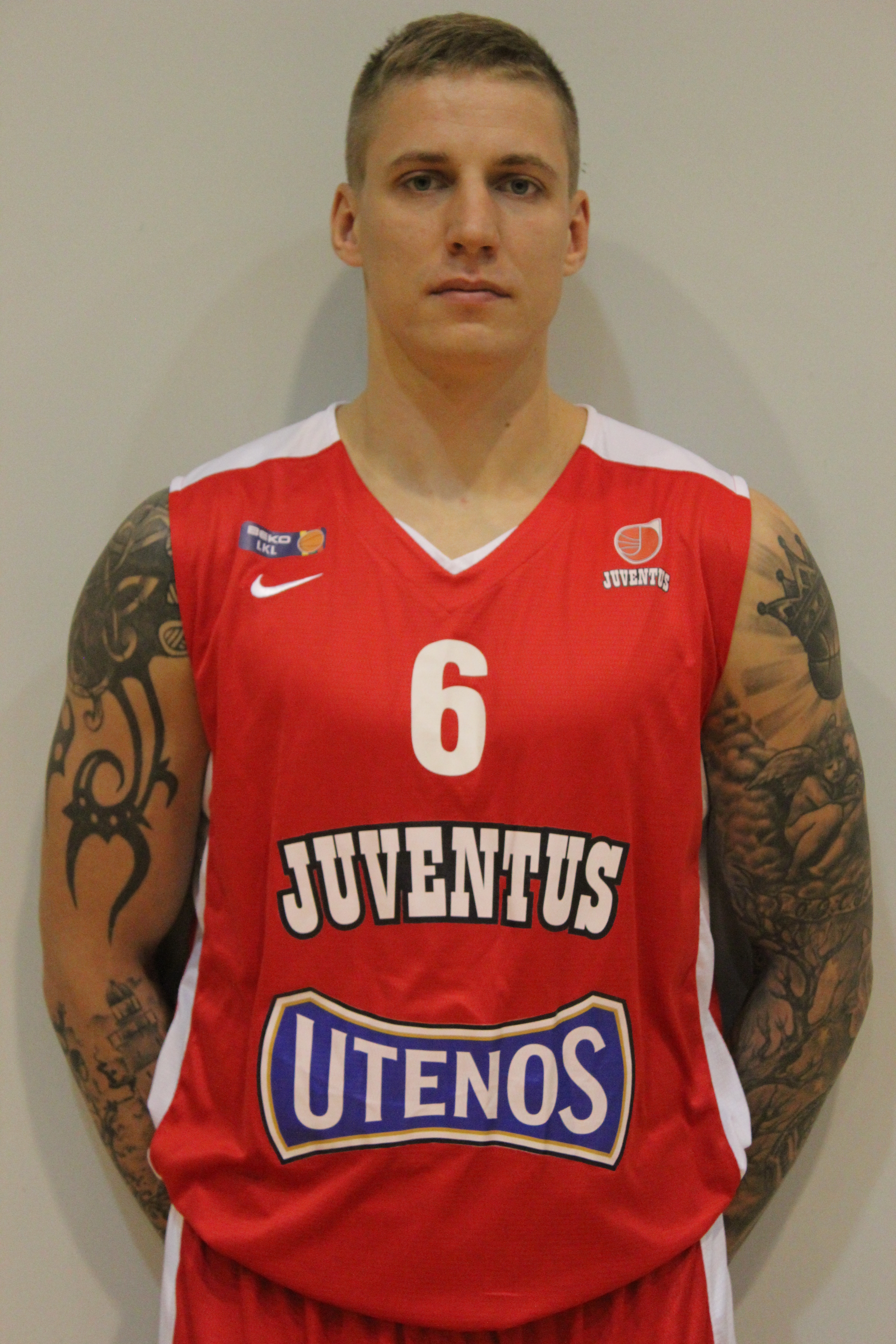
- Šikšnius with Juventus Utena in 2014

Personal information
- Born: 10 October 1987 (age 39) Kretinga, Lithuanian SSR, Soviet Union
- Listed height: 6 ft 5 in (1.96 m)
- Listed weight: 236 lb (107 kg)

Career information
- Playing career: 2008–2023
- Position: Small forward / power forward

Career history
- 2007–2008: Malsta Jonava
- 2008–2010: Sakalai Vilnius
- 2009–2010: Šiauliai
- 2010: Lietuvos rytas Vilnius
- 2011: →Perlas Vilnius
- 2011–2012: →Šiauliai
- 2012–2013: →BBC Bayreuth
- 2013–2014: Nevėžis Kėdainiai
- 2014: TonyBet Prienai
- 2014–2015: Juventus Utena
- 2015–2017: Neptūnas Klaipėda
- 2017–2019: Juventus Utena
- 2019–2021: Pieno žvaigždės Pasvalys
- 2023: BC Kretinga

Career highlights
- 5× LKL All-Star (2009–2011, 2014, 2015); LKL All-Star Day Slam Dunk Contest champion (2009); NKL All-Star Day Slam Dunk Contest champion (2008)

Arvydas Šikšnius (born 10 October 1987) is a Lithuanian former professional basketball player.

== Professional career ==
Šikšnius won the Lithuanian Basketball League (LKL) All-Star Game's Slam Dunk Contest, in 2009. He played for nine different LKL teams.
