= Dainius Šalenga =

Lithuanian basketball player

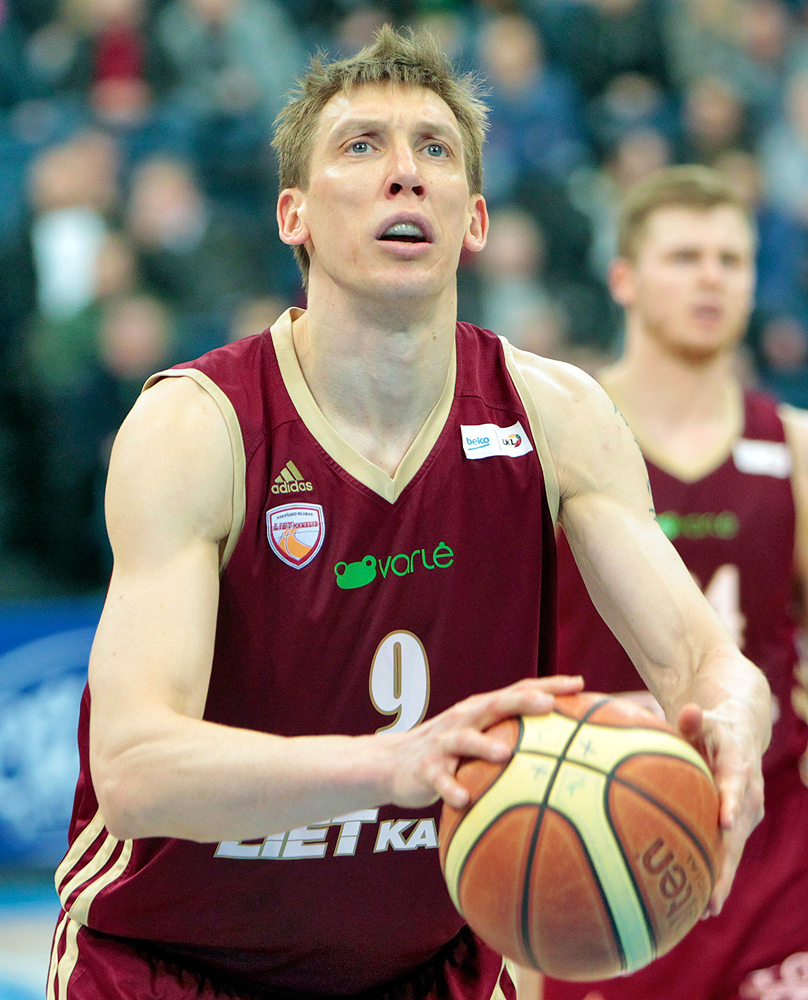
- Šalenga, with Lietkabelis' jersey.

BC Astana
- Title: Head coach
- League: Kazakhstan Championship

Personal information
- Born: April 15, 1977 (age 49) Varėna, Lithuania
- Listed height: 6 ft 6 in (1.98 m)
- Listed weight: 205 lb (93 kg)

Career information
- NBA draft: 1999: undrafted
- Playing career: 1997–2018
- Position: Small forward
- Number: 20, 10, 9

Career history

Playing
- 1997–1998: Farmeka Vilnius
- 1998–2000: Sakalai Vilnius
- 2000–2005: Žalgiris Kaunas
- 2005–2007: Akasvayu Girona
- 2007–2011: Žalgiris Kaunas
- 2011: Rūdupis Prienai
- 2011–2012: Žalgiris Kaunas
- 2012–2013: Budivelnyk Kyiv
- 2013: TonyBet Prienai
- 2013–2014: Budivelnyk Kyiv
- 2014–2015: Lietkabelis Panevėžys
- 2015–2016: Vytautas Prienai-Birštonas
- 2016–2017: Juventus Utena
- 2017: Dzūkija Alytus

Coaching
- 2019–2021: CBet Prienai (assistant)
- 2019: CBet Prienai (interim)
- 2021–2023: Pieno žvaigždės Pasvalys (assistant)
- 2025-2026: BC Astana (assistant)
- 2026-present: BC Astana

Career highlights
- 6× Lithuanian LKL champion (2001, 2003–2005, 2012, 2013); Lithuanian Slam Dunk champion (2002); 3× Baltic BBL champion (2005, 2008, 2011); FIBA EuroChallenge champion (2007); 2× Lithuanian All-Star (2009, 2011); Ukrainian BSL champion (2014)
Medals
Men's basketball
Representing Lithuania
EuroBasket
Gold medal – first place	2003 Sweden	National team

Dainius Šalenga (born 15 April 1977) is a Lithuanian retired professional basketball player. He is a small forward that is mainly known for his three–point shooting abilities. Šalenga represented the senior Lithuanian national basketball team at the 2004 Summer Olympics.

== Professional career ==
Šalenga was the team captain of Žalgiris Kaunas, in Lithuania, before being released by the club in January 2011. Šalenga won the EuroLeague Round 6 MVP award, on December 3, 2009.

== National team career ==
Šalenga was a member of the senior Lithuanian national basketball team. With Lithuania, he played at the 2003 EuroBasket, where he won a gold medal, and at the 2004 Summer Olympics.

== Career statistics ==
Legend
GP	Games played	GS	Games started	MPG	Minutes per game
FG%	Field-goal percentage	3P%	3-point field-goal percentage	FT%	Free-throw percentage
RPG	Rebounds per game	APG	Assists per game	SPG	Steals per game
BPG	Blocks per game	PPG	Points per game	PIR	Performance index rating
**Bold**	Career high

=== EuroLeague ===
Year	Team	GP	GS	MPG	FG%	3P%	FT%	RPG	APG	SPG	BPG	PPG	PIR
2000–01	Žalgiris	6	1	22.1	.469	.400	.833	2.3	1.2	1.0	.2	7.3	6.7
2001–02	Žalgiris	14	10	30.2	.448	.346	.810	2.6	1.9	1.4	**.4**	11.7	11.3
2002–03	Žalgiris	10	6	27.1	.485	.310	.600	2.2	1.8	1.0	**.4**	8.4	7.2
2003–04	Žalgiris	**20**	16	27.3	.399	.222	.718	2.4	2.0	1.0	.2	7.9	7.6
2004–05	Žalgiris	**20**	**19**	**33.5**	.489	.349	.706	2.8	**3.3**	**1.5**	.3	**12.0**	**13.1**
2007–08	Žalgiris	17	2	12.4	.457	.350	.625	1.9	.3	.5	.1	3.2	3.4
2008–09	Žalgiris	10	5	26.4	.412	.239	.676	**3.1**	1.6	1.2	.2	11.4	10.5
2009–10	Žalgiris	16	16	27.3	.410	**.411**	.757	3.0	1.2	1.3	.1	10.3	9.8
2010–11	Žalgiris	10	7	20.1	.340	.267	.857	1.6	1.1	.6	.1	4.8	3.8
2011–12	Žalgiris	6	4	25.1	.412	.375	**.1000**	2.2	1.5	.7	.2	6.0	5.3
2013–14	Budivelnyk	7	5	24.4	**.535**	.333	.800	2.4	2.4	.7	.1	8.0	10.6
Career		136	91	25.7	.441	.319	.740	2.5	1.7	1.0	.2	8.6	8.4
