= Donatas Slanina =

Lithuanian basketball player (born 1977)

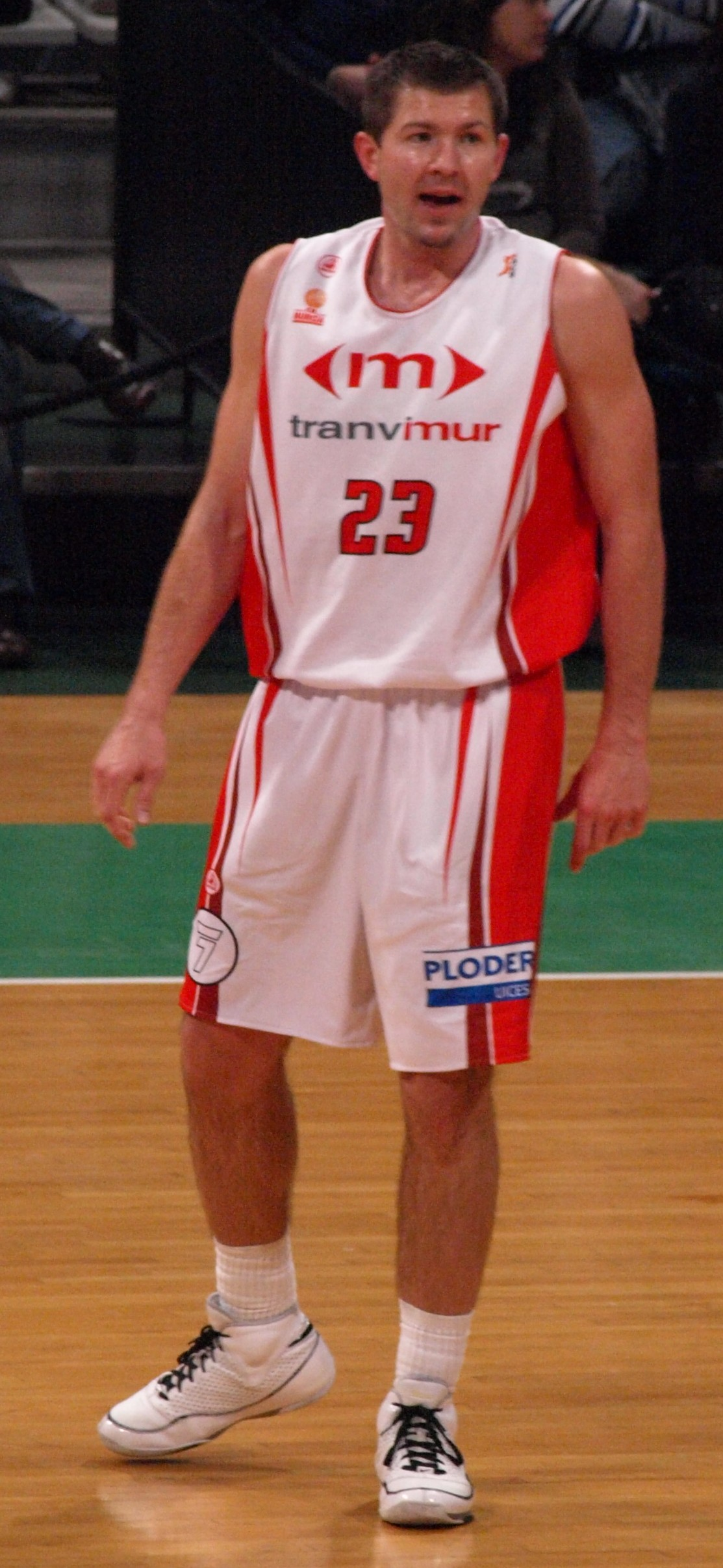
- Slanina, with Murcia, in 2009.

Personal information
- Born: April 23, 1977 (age 49) Šiauliai, Lithuania
- Listed height: 193 cm (6 ft 4 in)
- Listed weight: 95 kg (209 lb)

Career information
- NBA draft: 1999: undrafted
- Playing career: 1993–2013
- Position: Shooting guard

Career history

Playing
- 1993–1999: Šiauliai
- 1999–2002: Žalgiris
- 2002–2006: Sevilla
- 2006–2008: Prokom Trefl Sopot
- 2008–2009: Murcia
- 2009–2013: Reggiana

Coaching
- 2015–2017: Reggiana (assistant)

Career highlights
- As a player: Lithuanian LKL League champion (2001); Lithuanian LKL 3-Point Shootout champion (2001); 2× Polish League champion (2007, 2008); Polish League Finals MVP (2007)
Medals
Men's basketball
Representing Lithuania
EuroBasket
| Gold medal – first place | 2003 Sweden | Team |

Donatas Slanina (born 23 April 1977) is a Lithuanian former professional basketball player who played as a shooting guard in his professional career. He also shortly worked as an assistant coach. After starting his professional career in Šiauliai, he was best known for playing in Lithuanian champion Žalgiris and Pallacanestro Reggiana. He is one of the best three point shooter in Europe. Slanina also was member of Lithuania national team, winning gold medal in Eurobasket 2003.

== Coaching career ==
In July 2015, Slanina was named the assistant to head coach Massimiliano Menetti, at Pallacanestro Reggiana, the club where he finished his playing career. After the 2016–17 season, Slanina contract was not renewed by Pallacanestro Reggiana, but the Lithuanian and his family continue to live in Reggio Emilia.

== Career statistics ==
Legend
| GP | Games played | GS | Games started | MPG | Minutes per game |
| FG% | Field-goal percentage | 3P% | 3-point field-goal percentage | FT% | Free-throw percentage |
| RPG | Rebounds per game | APG | Assists per game | SPG | Steals per game |
| BPG | Blocks per game | PPG | Points per game | PIR | Performance index rating |
| **Bold** | Career high |

=== EuroLeague ===
| Year | Team | GP | GS | MPG | FG% | 3P% | FT% | RPG | APG | SPG | BPG | PPG | PIR |
|---|---|---|---|---|---|---|---|---|---|---|---|---|---|
| 2000–01 | Žalgiris | 12 | 9 | 28.2 | **.580** | **.552** | .870 | **3.3** | 1.0 | .7 | **.3** | 14.5 | **13.7** |
| 2001–02 | Žalgiris | 14 | 6 | **30.5** | .456 | .323 | .882 | 2.7 | 1.7 | **1.0** | .0 | **16.6** | 11.1 |
| 2006–07 | Asseco Gdynia | **20** | **15** | 26.0 | .547 | .337 | **.896** | 1.8 | 1.5 | .8 | .1 | 10.9 | 9.2 |
| 2007–08 | Asseco Gdynia | 14 | 12 | 28.1 | .491 | .424 | .818 | 1.9 | **1.9** | .8 | .1 | 11.1 | 8.5 |

== Awards and achievements ==
=== Pro clubs ===
- Lithuanian League Champion: (2001)
- Lithuanian LKL 3-Point Shootout: Champion (2001)
- 2× Polish League Champion: (2007, 2008)
- Polish League Finals MVP: (2007)

=== Lithuanian senior national team ===
- EuroBasket 2003: Gold
