= Sonny Weems =

American basketball player

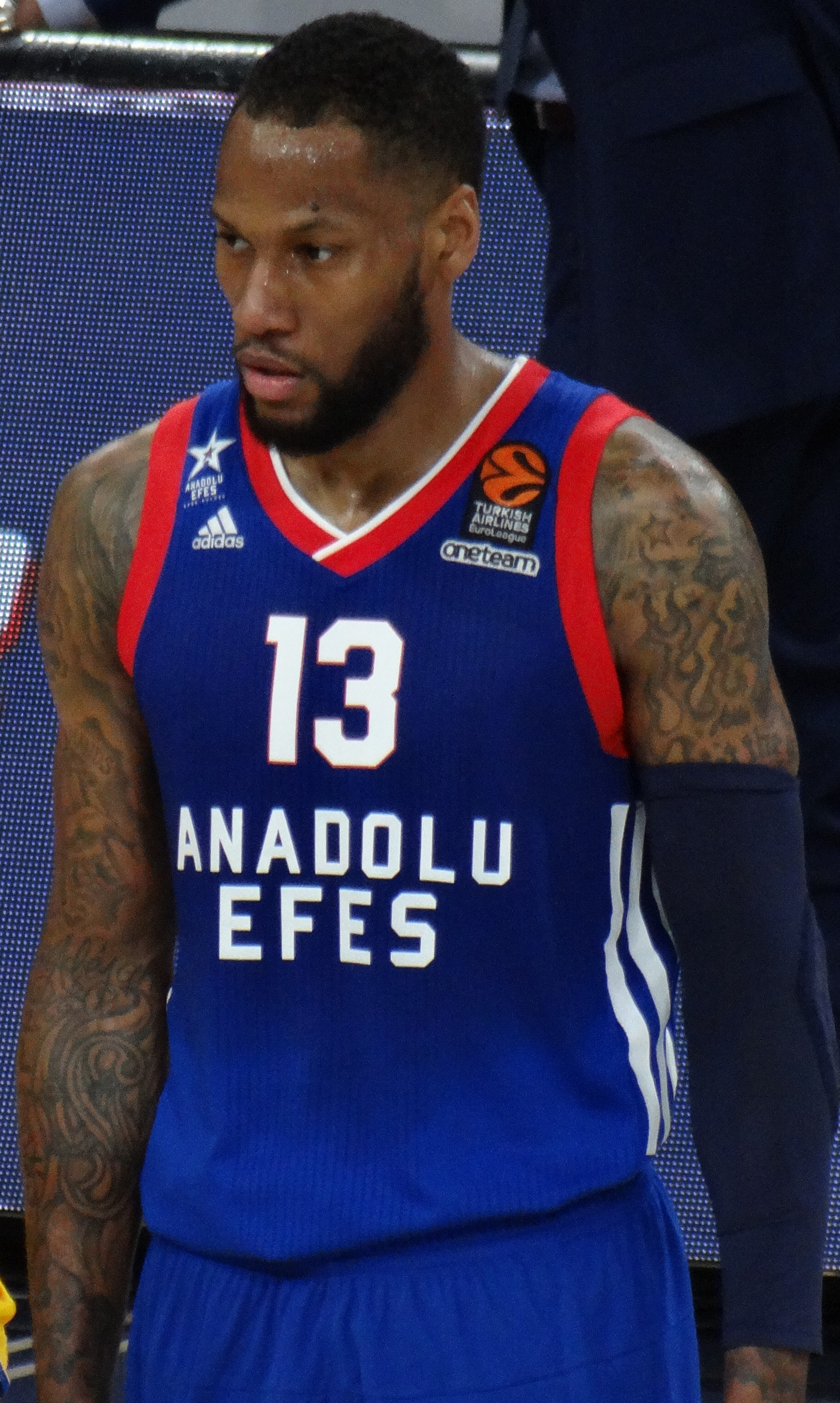
- Weems with Anadolu Efes in 2018

No. 13 – Jiaozuo Cultural Tourism
- Position: Small forward / shooting guard
- League: National Basketball League

Personal information
- Born: July 8, 1986 (age 40) West Memphis, Arkansas, U.S.
- Listed height: 6 ft 6 in (1.98 m)
- Listed weight: 205 lb (93 kg)

Career information
- High school: West Memphis (West Memphis, Arkansas)
- College: Arkansas–Fort Smith (2004–2006); Arkansas (2006–2008)
- NBA draft: 2008: 2nd round, 39th overall pick
- Drafted by: Chicago Bulls
- Playing career: 2008–present

Career history
- 2008–2009: Denver Nuggets
- 2008–2009: →Colorado 14ers
- 2009–2011: Toronto Raptors
- 2011–2012: Žalgiris Kaunas
- 2012–2015: CSKA Moscow
- 2015–2016: Phoenix Suns
- 2016: Philadelphia 76ers
- 2016–2017: Maccabi Tel Aviv
- 2017–2018: Zhejiang Golden Bulls
- 2018: Anadolu Efes
- 2018–2022: Guangdong Southern Tigers
- 2022–2023: Shanxi Loongs
- 2023–2024: Guangdong Southern Tigers
- 2024: Shijiazhuang Xianglan
- 2024–2025: Shenzhen Leopards
- 2026–present: Jiaozuo Cultural Tourism

Career highlights
- CBA Finals MVP (2020); 3× CBA champion (2019–2021); All-EuroLeague First Team (2014); 3× VTB United League champion (2013–2015); All-VTB United League First Team (2013); All-Russian League Second Team (2013); LKL All-Star (2012); LKL All-Star Day Slam Dunk champion (2012); LKF Cup winner (2012); First-team All-SEC (2008); LKL champion (2012); NJCAA third-team All-American (2005)
- Stats at NBA.com
- Stats at Basketball Reference

Clarence "Sonny" Weems (born July 8, 1986) is an American professional basketball player for the Jiaozuo Cultural Tourism of the National Basketball League. He played college basketball for the University of Arkansas and the University of Arkansas at Fort Smith. He was selected by the Chicago Bulls in the 2008 NBA draft and shortly thereafter traded to the Denver Nuggets. He has since played for the Toronto Raptors, Phoenix Suns and Philadelphia 76ers in the NBA, and has had stints in Lithuania and Russia. At 6 ft 6 in (1.98 m), Weems plays both the shooting guard and small forward positions. He was an All-EuroLeague First Team selection in 2014.

== Early life ==
Weems was born with cleft feet, and as a child, he was told that he might not be able to walk or run. He stumbled as a youngster and endured painful childhood nights in corrective shoes before finding his stride and becoming a state long-jump and high-jump champion.

== High school and college career ==
Weems played basketball at West Memphis High School where he was named first team all-state as a senior after leading his team to the 5A state championship, and was also a 6–10 high jumper in track and field. In Weems' high school career, West Memphis posted a record of 68–10. Weems averaged over 20 points per game as sophomore and junior, and 14.0 rebounds per game as a senior.

After high school, Weems attended junior college at the University of Arkansas-Fort Smith, and was named 3rd team All-American, as well as all-conference and all-region as a freshman. Ranked as the number one junior college player in the nation by Rivals.com and Street & Smith's, Weems took UAFS to the National Junior College Athletic Association (NJCAA) National Championship in 2006. Weems was named Honorable Mention All-American and was selected for the all-tournament team. In two seasons at UAFS, Weems led the team to a 62–7 record and back-to-back Bi-State Conference Eastern Division titles.

=== Arkansas Razorbacks ===
Weems signed with the Arkansas Razorbacks as a junior, which was also Stan Heath's final season as head coach. He averaged 11.8 points per game and was named to all-tournament teams at the Old Spice Classic and the SEC Tournament as he helped the Razorbacks to their third consecutive winning season and their second straight NCAA Tournament appearance, losing to the USC Trojans in the first round.

Weems played his senior season with a new head coach, John Pelphrey, and was named first team All-SEC after averaging 15.0 points, 4.5 rebounds and 2.6 assists per game. Weems led the Razorbacks to their first NCAA tournament win in nine years with an upset victory of Indiana University. He finished the game with 31 points, out-dueling the much-heralded freshman Eric Gordon, who was held to only eight points. After his team lost in the second round of the NCAA tournament, Weems later won the State Farm College Slam Dunk Championship held at the Final Four.

== Professional career ==
=== NBA ===
==== NBA draft ====
In April 2008, Weems accepted an invitation to participate in the Portsmouth Invitational Tournament, but later decided not to attend. Instead, Weems worked out with several teams: the Memphis Grizzlies, Orlando Magic, Chicago Bulls, Boston Celtics, Golden State Warriors, New Jersey Nets, New Orleans Hornets, and Portland Trail Blazers, receiving increased interest because of his high scores in speed and agility drills. Weems was selected with the 39th overall pick in the 2008 NBA draft by the Bulls, but he was traded almost immediately to the Denver Nuggets for a 2009 second-round pick in a three-team trade involving the Portland Trail Blazers.

==== NBA Development League ====
On December 10, 2008, the Nuggets, for whom he had yet to play because of a surgery for sports hernia and then a groin strain, assigned Weems to their NBA Development League affiliate the Colorado 14ers.

Weems averaged 18.0 points, 4.8 rebounds and 2.3 assists in 10 games for the 14ers. On December 14, Weems led the 14ers with 20 points, including 9-of-14 field goals, in a 129–108 home win over the Reno Bighorns. Other notable Weems performances include a team-leading 24 points in a thrilling 99–98 loss to Sioux Falls on December 17, a 26-point effort in a 111–104 loss to the Tulsa 66ers on December 20, 25 points in a 99–95 victory over the 66ers on December 23, and 24 points and 10 rebounds in a 131–120 14ers win over Fort Wayne on December 30. On January 6, 2009, Weems was recalled by the Denver Nuggets.

==== Denver Nuggets ====
Weems scored 4 points in his NBA regular season debut with the Nuggets on January 17, 2009, when he substituted for Anthony Carter with 3:31 remaining in a 106–88 loss to Orlando.

On July 31, 2009, he was traded along with Walter Sharpe and cash considerations to the Milwaukee Bucks for Malik Allen.

==== Toronto Raptors ====
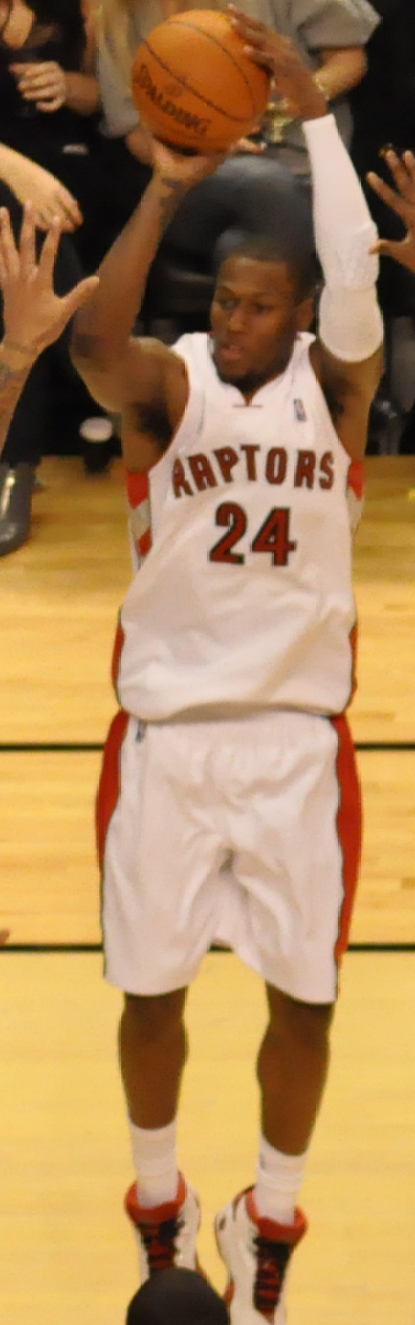
Weems with the Toronto Raptors in 2012

On August 18, 2009, Weems was traded by the Bucks to the Toronto Raptors along with Amir Johnson in exchange for Carlos Delfino and Roko Ukić. On April 7, 2010, Weems was placed in the starting lineup and scored a then career-high 21 points to lead the Raptors, but the Raptors lost the game to the Boston Celtics. He went on to score a career-high 25 points on November 17, 2010, against the Philadelphia 76ers.

=== Europe ===
==== Žalgiris Kaunas (2011–2012) ====
On July 8, 2011, Weems signed a one-year contract with the Lithuanian team Žalgiris Kaunas. His contract was terminated in March 2012, after he suffered a season-ending ankle injury. Weems later complained on social media saying that he had to go to U.S. to heal his sore ankle, after not receiving any medical care in Lithuania. Over 15 games in the EuroLeague, he averaged 15.5 points and 5 rebounds per game.

==== CSKA Moscow (2012–2015) ====
===== 2012–13 season =====
On July 30, 2012, he signed a three-year contract with CSKA Moscow. His signing was largely seen as a replacement to former team leader Andrei Kirilenko. On October 18, 2012, he had a EuroLeague career-high 30 points in a 76–71 overtime win over Partizan Belgrade. In his first season with the team, in a roster loaded with big European names like Miloš Teodosić, Nenad Krstić, Theo Papaloukas and Victor Khryapa, CSKA Moscow won 3rd place in the EuroLeague Final Four, after a 69–52 loss to Olympiacos in the semi-final game. Weems was seen as one of the team leaders, a starting small forward who averaged 13.7 points, 2.9 rebounds and 2.1 assists over 28 games in the EuroLeague. CSKA eventually won the VTB United League after defeating Lokomotiv Kuban, 3–1, in the final series.

===== 2013–14 season =====
In the 2013–14 season, CSKA's roster didn't change much, and Weems was again one of the team leaders. On January 17, 2014, he had career-high 10 assists, along with 16 points, in 72–73 EuroLeague loss to Partizan Belgrade. In May 2014, Weems was named the All-EuroLeague First Team of the EuroLeague, for his performances over the season. Although his points per game slightly dropped to 12.2 in the EuroLeague, he improved his defensive play and generally had a bigger impact on the game itself. However, CSKA Moscow was yet again stopped in the semi-final game, this time to the eventual champion Maccabi Tel Aviv. Later in the season, CSKA won its third consecutive VTB United League championship by defeating Nizhny Novgorod, 3–0, in the final series.

On July 4, 2014, Weems extended his contract with the club until 2017.

===== 2014–15 season =====
In the 2014–15 season, CSKA Moscow advanced to the EuroLeague Final Four for the fourth straight season, after eliminating Panathinaikos for the second straight season in the quarter-final series, 3–1. However, in the semi-final game, despite being dubbed by media as an absolute favorite to advance, they once again lost to Olympiacos. The final score was 70–68, after an Olympiacos comeback in fourth quarter, led by Vassilis Spanoulis. CSKA Moscow then won the third place after defeating Fenerbahçe, 86–80. Weems' third season saw a slight increase in statistics, as he averaged 13.1 points, 4 rebounds and 3.5 assists over 26 games played. CSKA Moscow finished the season by winning the VTB United League, after eliminating Khimki with 3–0 in the final series.

On June 16, 2015, he parted ways with CSKA Moscow to return to the NBA. Over three seasons spent with CSKA, Weems played in 166 games, averaging 12.1 points, 3.1 rebounds and 3 assists per game in the EuroLeague and the VTB United League.

=== Return to the NBA ===
==== Phoenix Suns (2015–2016) ====
On July 17, 2015, Weems signed a two-year deal with the Phoenix Suns. He made his debut for the Suns in the team's season opener against the Dallas Mavericks on October 28, recording 3 rebounds, 2 assists and 1 steal in a 111–95 loss. On January 26, 2016, he scored a season-high 12 points in a loss to the Philadelphia 76ers. On March 5, 2016, he was waived by the Suns after averaging 2.5 points, 1.3 assists, 1.1 rebounds and 11.7 minutes in 36 games.

==== Philadelphia 76ers (2016) ====
On March 7, 2016, Weems was claimed off waivers by the Philadelphia 76ers. Weems struggled during his time with the 76ers, and after straining his right quadriceps on March 26 against the Portland Trail Blazers, he was waived by the team the next day.

=== Return overseas ===
==== Maccabi Tel Aviv (2016–2017) ====
On June 14, 2016, Weems signed a two-year contract with Israeli club Maccabi Tel Aviv. On January 30, 2017, Weems was released by the club after he failed to complete an anti-doping test.

==== Zhejiang Golden Bulls (2017–2018) ====
In July 2017, Weems signed with the Zhejiang Golden Bulls of the Chinese Basketball Association. Weems played 38 games for Zhejiang and averaged 31.7 points, 8 rebounds and 5.9 assists per game.

==== Anadolu Efes (2018) ====
On February 24, 2018, Weems signed with the Turkish team Anadolu Efes for the rest of the season. On March 1, 2018, Weems made his debut in a 64–77 loss to Olimpia Milano, scoring 19 points, along with 6 rebounds and 2 assists.

==== Guangdong Southern Tigers (2018–2022 & 2023-2024) ====
On October 8, 2018, Weems signed with the Guangdong Southern Tigers of the Chinese Basketball Association. With Guangdong, he won three consecutive CBA titles from 2019 to 2021, and was named Finals MVP in 2020 after averaging 34.7 points in a 2–1 series against Liaoning Flying Leopards.

In January 2022, after the match between Liaoning Flying Leopards, Weems was involved in an altercation with Liaoning Flying Leopards player Han Dejun, which resulted in both players being ejected from the match, with Han being fined $31,440 and suspended for seven games, while Weems was fined $22,008 and suspended for five games. As a result of the incident, Weems was subjected to racial abuse by Liaoning Flying Leopards fans who kept shouting "nigger" and "get out of China" at him, as he was exiting the Guangdong Southern Tigers team bus along with the rest of the team. The Liaoning Flying Leopards fans' behaviour towards Weems was condemned by the Chinese Basketball Association and basketball player Jeremy Lin.

=== Shanxi Loongs (2022–2023) ===
In 2022, Weems signed a one-year deal with Shanxi Loongs of the Chinese Basketball Association.

=== Shenzhen Leopards (2024–2025) ===
On October 13, 2024, Weems signed with Shenzhen Leopards of the Chinese Basketball Association.

== Personal life ==
In May 2020, Weems donated protective masks to the town of West Memphis, Arkansas to help fight against Coronavirus. He wanted the elderly population and low-income families to have priority in the mask distribution as his grandmother works in the nursing home. The donation was made through this foundation called "Weems World."

In June 2024, Weems led the Athletes Abroad Summit which was aimed at equipping American athletes for success in international sports. He was joined by Kyle Hines and Edniesha Curry.

== Career statistics ==
Legend
GP	Games played	GS	Games started	MPG	Minutes per game
FG%	Field-goal percentage	3P%	3-point field-goal percentage	FT%	Free-throw percentage
RPG	Rebounds per game	APG	Assists per game	SPG	Steals per game
BPG	Blocks per game	PPG	Points per game	PIR	Performance index rating
**Bold**	Career high

=== NBA ===
==== Regular season ====
Year	Team	GP	GS	MPG	FG%	3P%	FT%	RPG	APG	SPG	BPG	PPG
2008–09	Denver	12	0	4.6	.320	.000	.375	.3	.3	.1	.0	1.6
2009–10	Toronto	**69**	19	19.8	**.515**	.133	.688	**2.8**	1.5	**.6**	**.4**	7.5
2010–11	Toronto	59	**28**	**23.9**	.444	.279	**.766**	2.6	**1.8**	**.6**	.0	**9.2**
2015–16	Phoenix	36	0	11.7	.393	**.406**	.538	1.1	1.3	.3	.0	2.5
2015–16	Philadelphia	7	0	11.1	.333	.222	.500	1.7	.3	.0	.0	2.4
Career		183	47	18.2	.465	.283	.702	2.2	1.4	.5	.2	6.5

=== EuroLeague ===
Year	Team	GP	GS	MPG	FG%	3P%	FT%	RPG	APG	SPG	BPG	PPG	PIR
2011–12	Žalgiris	15	15	29.9	**.474**	.360	.686	**5.0**	1.3	.9	**.2**	**15.5**	12.7
2012–13	CSKA Moscow	28	**27**	28.8	.472	**.385**	**.813**	2.9	2.1	.8	.1	13.7	11.8
2013–14	CSKA Moscow	**29**	**27**	28.5	.442	.354	.754	3.5	3.7	.9	**.2**	12.2	12.4
2014–15	CSKA Moscow	26	22	26.9	.425	.371	.792	4.0	3.5	**1.0**	**.2**	13.1	11.8
2016–17	Maccabi	19	16	27.0	.509	.327	.703	3.3	3.4	.9	.1	11.6	11.1
2017–18	Anadolu Efes	6	6	**30.4**	.452	.318	.769	3.5	**4.0**	.7	.0	**15.5**	**13.7**
Career		123	113	28.3	.459	.361	.757	3.6	3.0	.9	.2	13.2	12.0

=== Domestic leagues ===
Year	Team	League	GP	GS	MPG	FG%	3P%	FT%	RPG	APG	SPG	BPG	PPG
2011–12	(Lithuania) Žalgiris	LKL	13	12	23.6	.441	.343	.694	3.9	1.9	1.4	.1	9.9
2011–12	(Lithuania) Žalgiris	VTB	16	16	25.4	.474	.342	.735	4.1	2.0	.8	**.4**	10.3
2012–13	(Russia) CSKA	VTB	25	19	24.3	.485	.442	.659	2.5	1.7	.7	.1	11.5
2012–13	(Russia) CSKA	PBL	15	14	24.6	.454	**.468**	.667	3.1	2.1	.5	.0	11.2
2013–14	(Russia) CSKA	VTB	26	25	29.0	.444	.371	.711	3.2	3.3	1.0	**.4**	11.0
2014–15	(Russia) CSKA	VTB	31	26	22.1	.454	.437	.750	2.7	3.5	.6	.2	11.6
2016–17	(Israel) Maccabi	ISBL	11	9	24.3	.333	.229	**.846**	3.8	4.5	1.0	.1	7.7
2017–18	(China) Zhejiang	CBA	38	**38**	**38.9**	.509	.409	.834	**8.0**	5.9	**1.6**	.3	**31.7**
2017–18	(Turkey) Anadolu Efes	BSL	15	10	27.7	.500	.333	.773	3.4	3.1	.7	.1	12.9
2018–19	(China) Guangdong	CBA	**54**	12	33.2	**.566**	.371	.786	5.7	**6.4**	**1.6**	.2	23.1
2019–20	(China) Guangdong	CBA	51	30	29.5	.539	.364	.817	6.1	6.1	**1.6**	**.4**	21.8
2020–21	(China) Guangdong	CBA	**54**	36	21.3	.505	.333	.796	4.7	5.2	1.4	.2	16.7
2021–22	(China) Guangdong	CBA	27	27	27.0	.505	.397	.824	4.7	5.6	1.2	.4	15.0

Source: RealGM
