= Darius Sirtautas =

Lithuanian basketball player and coach

Personal information
- Born: July 14, 1970 (age 56) Šilutė, Lithuanian SSR, Soviet Union
- Listed height: 6 ft 4 in (1.93 m)
- Listed weight: 203 lb (92 kg)

Career information
- Playing career: 1989–2005
- Position: shooting guard

Career history
- 1989–1995: Atletas Kaunas
- 1995–1998: Žalgiris Kaunas
- 1998–1999: Slovakofarma Pezinok
- 1999–2000: Kraitenė Marijampolė
- 2000–2002: Jinan Junan
- 2002–2003: Audentes Tallinn
- 2003–2004: Atletas-Topo Centras Kaunas
- 2004–2005: Punktukas Anykščiai

Career highlights
- LKL All-Star Day Slam Dunk Contest champion (1995, 1997, 1998)

Darius Sirtautas (born July 14, 1970, in Šilutė, Lithuania) is a former Lithuanian professional basketball player, and basketball coach. During his playing career, he was a 6-foot-4-inch (1.93 m) tall shooting guard.

== Playing career ==
Sirtautas started his professional career in Atletas Kaunas, in 1989. After a few seasons with the team, he became a team leader, and while playing alongside Saulius Štombergas and Žydrūnas Ilgauskas, managed to lead the team to the LKL Finals twice. During his last season with the team, he averaged 15 points per game. After that successful season, Lithuania national team coaches invited Sirtautas to the training camp for the upcoming EuroBasket, but he did not make it onto the final roster.

In 1995, he moved to his former rival team, Žalgiris Kaunas. He was one of the main contributors to the team, averaging more than 10 points per game, over the next three seasons, despite having to share his minutes with stars like Rimas Kurtinaitis, Darius Lukminas, and Ennis Whatley. While playing for Žalgiris, he participated in the LKL Slam Dunk Contest, and he won the slam dunk title three times in a row.

In 1998, Sirtautas moved to Slovakia, where he played with Slovakofarma Pezinok, in the FIBA Saporta Cup. He recorded 7.8 points and 1.2 steals per game in that tournament. Returning to Lithuania the following season, Sirtautas signed with Suvalkija Marijampolė. However, the team went bankrupt at the end of the season, and he was forced to look for a club elsewhere.

In 2000, he moved to China, and signed with Junan Jinan, of the Chinese Basketball Association (CBA). During the 2001–02 season, he played alongside fellow Lithuanians Rolandas Urkis and Martynas Purlys. In March 2002, Sirtautas moved back to Lithuania, and he finished the season with Alita Alytus.

Sirtautas played for the Estonian club Audentes Tallinn, during the 2002–03 season. In April, he once again moved back to Lithuania, and after playing two more seasons, he retired in 2005.

== Coaching career ==
Sirtautas coached Atletas Kaunas, for the 2006–07 season. He was also the head coach of the Lithuanian Under-16 national team, which participated in the 2011 FIBA Europe Under-16 Championship. He recently coached at the Arvydas Sabonis Basketball School, and at BC Nevėžis, of the Lithuanian Basketball League.
