= LKL Three-point Shootout =

Lithuanian professional contest

The LKL Three-point Shootout, currently known as Betsson Casino Three-point Shootout for sponsorship purposes, is a Lithuanian professional King Mindaugas Cup final day contest, that is held between the cup's final and third-place matches. Formerly, it was a part of the LKL's All-Star Day, and took place before the All-Star Game.

The current champion is Nojus Mineikis representing Gargždai.

== History ==
The very first three-point shootout contest was won by Richard Thomas, of Šilutė, at the 1994 LKL All-Star Day, in Panevėžys.

== Rules ==
Each Lithuanian Basketball League team has a chance to delegate one player for the contest, while the player with the league's best three-point field goal shooting percentage enters automatically.

Competitors try to score as many points as possible, in one minute. There are five ball racks, laid out over the three-point arc: one on each baseline, one halfway between the baseline, and the top of the arc on each side, and one at the top of the arc. Each rack has five balls, four of which are worth one point (the standard orange balls), and the fifth one (a red, white, and blue ball; nicknamed the "money ball"), is worth two points. Thus, a perfect score is 30 points.

In case of an equal result, each player gets 25 seconds to shoot from two racks of their choosing. The contestant(s) with the best results progress further.

In the first round, each contestant has one chance to score as many points as possible. The four best performers advance to the semi-final, where two more are eliminated, while the remaining contenders compete for the title of LKL Sniper.

== Shootout champions ==
| Year | Player | Nationality | Team | Ref. |
|---|---|---|---|---|
| 1994 (Panevėžys) | Richard Thomas | United States | Šilutė | |
| 1995 (Alytus) | Joey Vickery | Canada | Olimpas | |
| 1997 (Kaunas) | Svajūnas Airošius | Lithuania | Neptūnas | |
| 1998 (Vilnius) | Arūnas Grigas | Lithuania | Alita | |
| 1999 (Kaunas) | Svajūnas Airošius (2×) | Lithuania | Neptūnas | |
| 2000 (Kaunas) | Arvydas Macijauskas | Lithuania | Lietuvos Rytas | |
| 2001 (Kaunas) | Donatas Slanina | Lithuania | Žalgiris | |
| 2002 (Kaunas) | Arvydas Macijauskas (2×) | Lithuania | Lietuvos Rytas | |
| 2003 (Kaunas) | Arvydas Macijauskas (3×) | Lithuania | Lietuvos Rytas | |
| 2004 (Kaunas) | Ainars Bagatskis | Latvia | Žalgiris | |
| 2005 (Vilnius) | Petras Šalvis | Lithuania | Neptūnas | |
| 2006 (Vilnius) | Marius Kasiulevičius | Lithuania | Neptūnas | |
| 2007 (Vilnius) | Gytis Sirutavičius | Lithuania | Nevėžis | |
| 2008 (Šiauliai) | Marius Runkauskas | Lithuania | Neptūnas | |
| 2009 (Šiauliai) | Marius Kasiulevičius (2×) | Lithuania | Neptūnas | |
| 2010 (Panevėžys) | Derrick Low | United States | Šiauliai | |
| 2011 (Šiauliai) | Edvinas Ruzgas | Lithuania | Šiauliai | |
| 2012 (Klaipėda) | Žygimantas Šeštokas | Lithuania | Juventus | |
| 2013 (Šiauliai) | Marius Runkauskas (2×) | Lithuania | Neptūnas | |
| 2014 (Klaipėda) | Marius Runkauskas (3×) | Lithuania | Neptūnas | |
| 2015 (Vilnius) | Ela Briedytė | Lithuania | Sudūva–Mantinga, LMKL | |
| 2016 (Vilnius) | Derrick Low (2×) | United States | Pieno Žvaigždės | |
| 2017 (Kaunas) | Arvydas Čepulis | Lithuania | Šiauliai | |
| 2018 (Klaipėda) | Mindaugas Lukauskis | Lithuania | Lietuvos rytas | |
| 2019 (Vilnius) | Martynas Gecevičius | Lithuania | BC Prienai | |
| 2020 (Klaipėda) | Osvaldas Olisevičius | Lithuania | Neptūnas | |
| 2021 (Panevėžys) | Andrew Goudelock | United States | Rytas | |
| 2022 (Vilnius) | Rihards Kuksiks | Latvia | Nevėžis–OPTIBET | |
| 2023 (Šiauliai) | Rihards Kuksiks (2×) | Latvia | Pieno Žvaigždės | |
| 2024 (Kaunas) | Rasheed Sulaimon (Note: After the contest, it was noted that Rasheed Sulaimon scored only 16 points instead of 18 points and the series should have been tied. The LKL presented a prize of the same value to Sean McNeil and the contest title is shared between these two players.) | United States | Wolves | |
| 2024 (Kaunas) | Sean McNeil | United States | Nevėžis–OPTIBET | |
| 2025 (Vilnius) | Laurynas Beliauskas | Lithuania | Uniclub Bet – Juventus | |
| 2026 (Šiauliai) | Nojus Mineikis | Lithuania | Gargždai | |

== Champions by club ==
| No. | Club | Last win |
|---|---|---|
| 9 | Neptūnas | 2020 |
| 5 | Rytas | 2021 |
| 3 | Nevėžis | 2024 |
| 3 | Šiauliai | 2017 |
| 2 | Juventus | 2025 |
| 2 | Pieno Žvaigždės | 2023 |
| 2 | Žalgiris | 2004 |
| 1 | Wolves | 2024 |
| 1 | Prienai | 2019 |
| 1 | Alita | 1998 |
| 1 | Olimpas Plungė | 1995 |
| 1 | Šilutė | 1994 |
| 1 | Gargždai | 2026 |
| 1 | Guests | |

== See also ==
- LKL All-Star Game
- LKL All-Star Day
- LKL All-Star Game MVP
- LKL Slam Dunk Contest
