= Marius Runkauskas =

Lithuanian basketball player

Neptūnas-Akvaservis
- Position: Shooting guard
- League: Nacionalinė krepšinio lyga (NKL)

Personal information
- Born: May 20, 1986 (age 40) Klaipėda, Lithuanian SSR, Soviet Union
- Listed height: 1.89 m (6 ft 2 in)
- Listed weight: 78 kg (172 lb)

Career information
- NBA draft: 2008: undrafted
- Playing career: 2003–present

Career history
- 2003–2007: Nafta-Uni-Laivitė Klaipėda
- 2007–2008: Neptūnas Klaipėda
- 2008–2009: Sūduva Marijampolė
- 2009: ASK Riga
- 2009–2011: UJAP Quimper
- 2011–2014: Neptūnas Klaipėda
- 2014–2015: CSU Asesoft Ploiești
- 2015–2016: Lietuvos rytas Vilnius
- 2016–2018: Steaua București
- 2018–2021: Juventus Utena
- 2021–2023: Gargždai-SC
- 2023-2024: BC Olimpas Palanga
- 2024-present: Klaipėdos Neptūnas-Akvaservis

Career highlights
- 3× LKL Three-point Shootout champion (2008, 2013–2014); LKL All-Star (2014); King Mindaugas Cup winner (2016); Romanian League MVP (2015); Romanian League Finals MVP (2015); Romanian League Three-point Shootout champion (2015)

Marius Runkauskas (born May 20, 1986) is a Lithuanian professional basketball player. He plays primarily at the shooting guard position, but he can also play point guard, if needed.

== Early years ==
Runkauskas played in the Lithuanian Pupils Basketball League (MKL), for the V. Chomičius basketball school.

== Professional career ==
Runkauskas started his professional basketball career in the Klaipėda, NKL (Lithuanian 2nd Division) team, Nafta-Uni-Laivitė, in 2003. After he became a champion of the NKL, in 2007, with Nafta-Uni-Laivitė, Klaipėda's strongest basketball club invited him to join their team. He averaged 8.8 points, 1.0 assists, and 1.5 rebounds per game.

The next year, he joined BC Sūduva, and in January 2009, he left the club, and joined the Latvian basketball team ASK Riga. In the following season, he averaged 16.9 points, 3.9 assists, and 3.3 rebounds per game. After the season, he joined UJAP Quimper, playing in the French 2nd Division. With UJAP, he averaged 14.1 points, 1.6 assists, and 2.6 rebounds per game.

In June 2011, he returned to BC Neptūnas, and signed a two-year contract with the team. In July 2014, he moved to Romania, and signed a one-year deal with CSU Asesoft Ploiești. In June 2015, he signed a two-year (1+1) deal with Lietuvos rytas Vilnius.

== International career ==
In 2015, Runkauskas was included into the senior Lithuanian national team extended candidates list, by the team's head coach, Jonas Kazlauskas. He also participated in the Lithuanian national team's training camp, but he was cut from the national team on August 16.

== Awards and achievements ==
- Lithuanian 2nd Division Runner-up: (2006)
- Lithuanian 2nd Division Champion: (2007)
- Eurobasket.com's Baltic BBL League All-Newcomers Team: (2008)
- 3× Lithuanian LKL League Three-point Shootout Champion: (2008, 2013, 2014)
