= Robertas Javtokas =

Lithuanian basketball player and executive

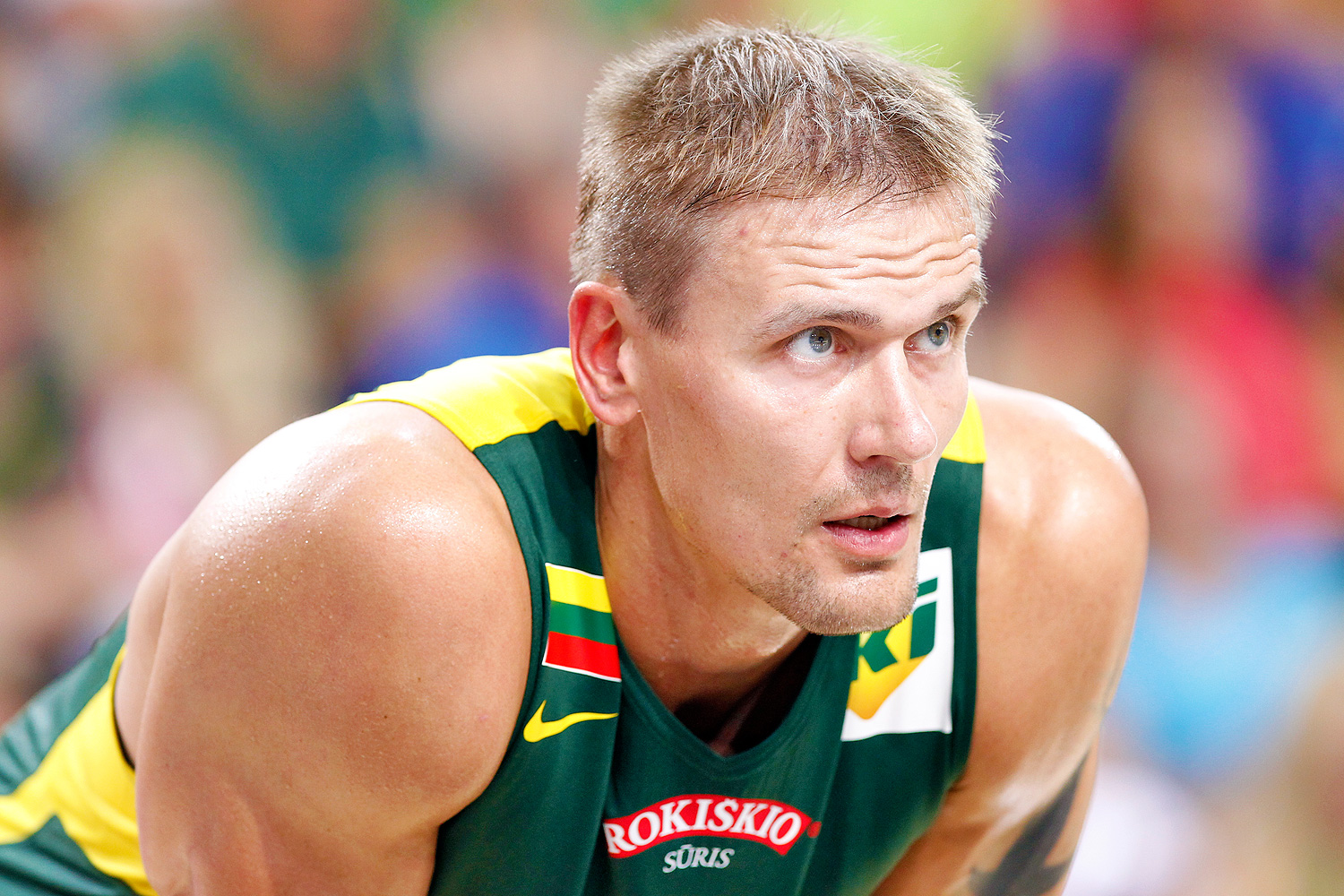
- Javtokas with Lithuania's national team in 2013

Personal information
- Born: March 20, 1980 (age 46) Šiauliai, Lithuanian SSR, Soviet Union
- Listed height: 6 ft 11 in (2.11 m)
- Listed weight: 270 lb (122 kg)

Career information
- College: Arizona (1999–2000)
- NBA draft: 2001: 2nd round, 55th overall pick
- Drafted by: San Antonio Spurs
- Playing career: 2000–2017
- Position: Center
- Number: 15, 19, 25, 51

Career history
- 2000–2006: Lietuvos rytas Vilnius
- 2006–2007: Panathinaikos
- 2007–2009: Dynamo Moscow
- 2009–2010: Khimki
- 2010–2011: Valencia
- 2011–2017: Žalgiris Kaunas

Career highlights
- EuroLeague champion (2007); ULEB Cup champion (2005); Greek League champion (2007); Greek Cup winner (2007); 9× LKL champion (2000, 2002, 2006, 2012–2017); 2× LKF Cup winner (2012, 2015); King Mindaugas Cup winner (2017); NEBL champion (2002); 2× BBL champion (2006, 2012); Lithuanian League Rookie of the Year (2001); 2× LKL Slam Dunk champion (2000, 2001); 4× LKL All-Star (2001, 2002, 2006, 2012); LKL All-Star Game MVP (2002); EuroCup Finals MVP (2005); EuroCup TOP 10 Players Of All Time (2012); LKL Defensive Player of the Year (2015)
- Stats at Basketball Reference
Medals
Men's basketball
Representing Lithuania
FIBA World Cup
Bronze medal – third place	Turkey 2010
EuroBasket
Silver medal – second place	2013 Slovenia
Silver medal – second place	2015 France–Croatia–Germany–Latvia
Bronze medal – third place	2007 Spain

Robertas Javtokas (born March 20, 1980) is a Lithuanian professional basketball executive and former player. He most recently served as sports director of Žalgiris Kaunas. Standing at 2.11 m (6 ft 11 in), he played the center position. He has been a member of the senior men's Lithuanian national team since 2004. In the 2001 NBA draft, he was selected by the San Antonio Spurs with the 55th overall pick.

== Player profile ==
Javtokas had athletic ability when he was young. As a young player, he was a good jumper, who had a 40-inch vertical leap and he could easily dunk in traffic. He was capable of running the floor and playing on the perimeter, using his physical attributes, size, and jumping ability. He recorded statistics in rebounding and defense. He once set a world record, by dunking on a 12-foot-high basket during the LKL Slam Dunk Contest.

== Professional career ==
=== Europe ===
In 2000, Javtokas joined Lietuvos rytas and quickly became the best center in the Lithuanian League. Javtokas, playing alongside Ramūnas Šiškauskas, Arvydas Macijauskas, Simas Jasaitis and Rimantas Kaukėnas won the 2002 Lithuanian League championship and also the North European League championship. After the motorcycle crash, Javtokas missed the entire 2003 season and came back in 2004. In 2005, he won the EuroCup championship and he was named the EuroCup Finals MVP.

In 2006, with his help, Rytas made a strong debut in the EuroLeague, and also beat their main rival Žalgiris 4–0 in Lithuanian league finals series. The team also won the Baltic League Championship. After the season, Javtokas was disappointed that Rytas was not able to offer him a bigger pare of money and also was returning to the EuroCup instead of the EuroLeague, so he decided to play in another club.

He joined Panathinaikos for the 2006–07 season and with them he won the Greek League championship, the Greek Cup title, and the EuroLeague championship (thus winning the coveted Basketball Triple Crown), although he played very limited minutes all season. On July 24, 2007, he signed a two-year contract with Dynamo Moscow of the Russian Super League A. In Dynamo, he improved his free throw percentage from 35.5 to 54.5 percent, and he improved in scoring average to 12.2 points per game. In 2009, he joined the Russian club Khimki Moscow Region. On July 15, 2010, he signed a two-year contract with the Spanish club Power Electronics Valencia.

In June 2011, he returned to Lithuania, and signed a three-year contract with the pro club Žalgiris, of the Lithuanian LKL. His contract was renewed in 2015. On June 20, 2012, Robertas Javtokas was named as one of the best EuroCup players of all time. He took 4th place out of 10. In 2015 his contract was extended for one more year. In 2016 his contract was further extended with Žalgiris.

On June 8, 2017, Javtokas announced his retirement from playing professional basketball. On June 9, 2017, he played his last game as a professional player.

=== NBA draft rights ===
Javtokas was selected by the San Antonio Spurs, with 55th overall pick in the 2001 NBA draft. The San Antonio Spurs retained his NBA draft rights for 16 years until 2017 when Javtokas announced his retirement from playing professional basketball. Javtokas is 1 of 8 players selected in the 2001 NBA Draft that ended up never playing a game in the league.

== National team career ==
Javtokas debuted with the senior men's Lithuanian national team at the 2004 Summer Olympics. He averaged 8.9 points, 4.4 rebounds, and 0.5 assists per game. At the EuroBasket 2005, he played in six games with the Lithuanian men's national basketball team. During the tournament, he averaged 11.0 points, 5.8 rebounds, and 1.5 assists per game. His 2-point field goal percentage was 61.7 percent, and his free-throw percentage was 47.1 percent.

He also played with Lithuania at the 2010 FIBA World Championship, where he won a bronze medal.

== EuroLeague career statistics ==
Legend
GP	Games played	GS	Games started	MPG	Minutes per game
FG%	Field-goal percentage	3P%	3-point field-goal percentage	FT%	Free-throw percentage
RPG	Rebounds per game	APG	Assists per game	SPG	Steals per game
BPG	Blocks per game	PPG	Points per game	PIR	Performance index rating
**Bold**	Career high	†	Won a EuroLeague championship

Year	Team	GP	GS	MPG	FG%	3P%	FT%	RPG	APG	SPG	BPG	PPG	PIR
2005–06	Lietuvos Rytas	20	20	**28.8**	.521	.125	.417	**8.2**	.9	**1.0**	**2.0**	9.6	**13.9**
2006–07†	Panathinaikos	19	3	8.8	.613	—	.355	1.6	.1	.3	.5	2.6	2.5
2009–10	Khimki	16	13	25.7	.591	.000	.457	6.4	.4	.2	1.2	**10.1**	12.3
2010–11	Valencia	21	20	24.7	.574	**.500**	.414	5.3	.7	.6	.7	8.2	9.1
2011–12	Žalgiris	16	14	23.4	.489	.000	.421	5.2	.5	.2	.7	6.3	6.8
2012–13	Žalgiris	8	4	15.0	.542	**.500**	.714	2.9	.6	.1	.4	4.0	5.4
2013–14	Žalgiris	**23**	**23**	24.8	.625	.273	**.750**	5.3	**1.4**	.5	1.1	9.7	12.7
2014–15	Žalgiris	**23**	19	23.2	.451	.000	.667	4.3	1.1	.4	.8	5.7	6.9
2015–16	Žalgiris	9	0	16.4	**.645**	.000	.444	3.7	.0	.3	.4	4.9	5.9
2016–17	Žalgiris	17	5	7.2	.607	—	.625	1.4	.2	.1	.0	2.3	1.9
Career	155	56	24.1	.565	.194	.484	4.9	.7	.4	.9	7.1	9.0	

== Post-playing career ==
Following his retirement from playing professional basketball, in 2017, Javtokas expressed his wish to not digress from the sport of basketball, and he was invited by Žalgiris Kaunas, to become the sports director of the club. On July 1, 2021, Javtokas left Žalgiris Kaunas in order to participate in the election of the president of the Lithuanian Basketball Federation.

== Awards and achievements ==
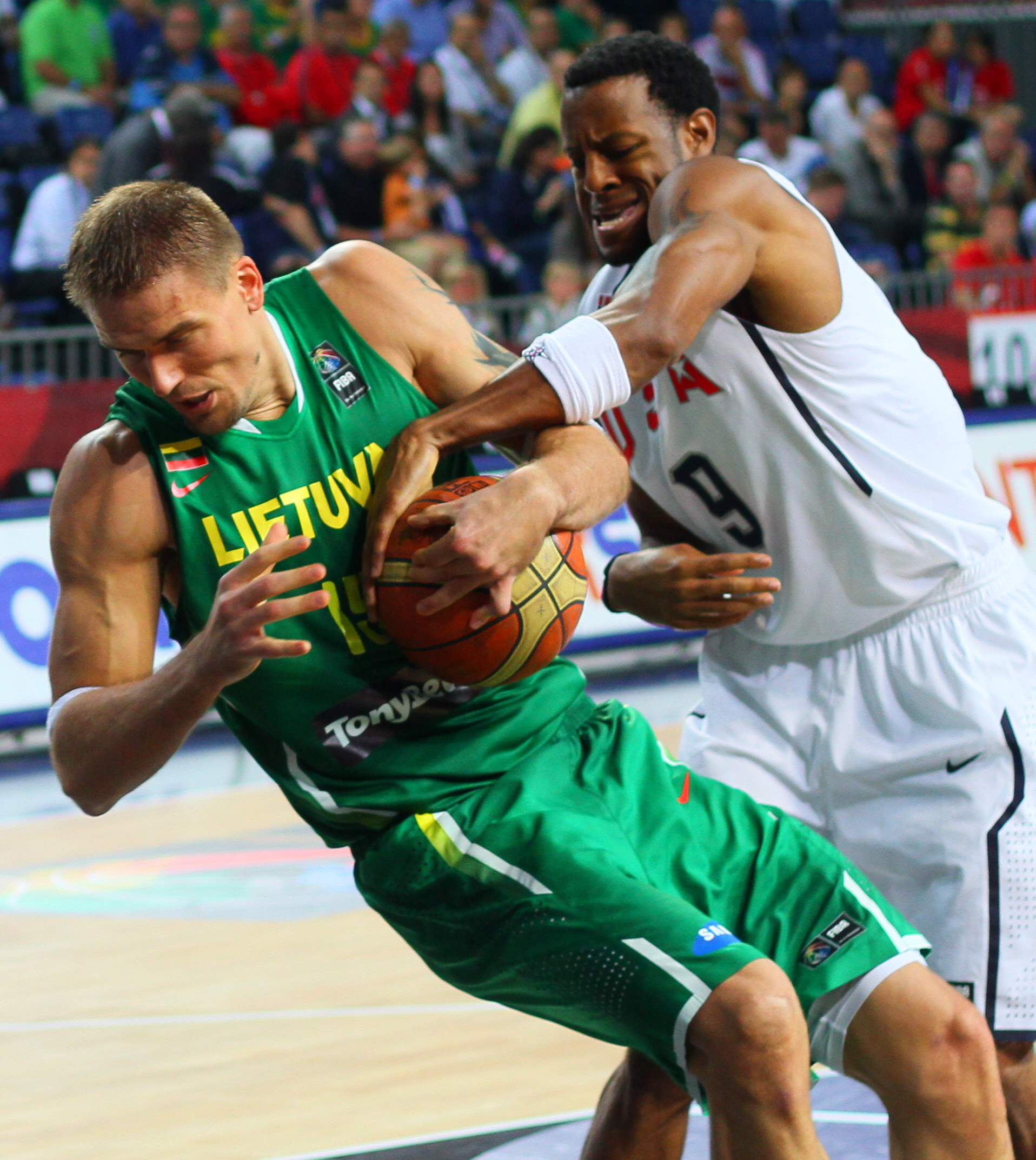
Javtokas, with Lithuania's national team, in 2010.

=== Club titles ===
- 9× Lithuanian League Champion: 2000, 2002, 2006, 2012, 2013, 2014, 2015, 2016, 2017
- North European League Champion: 2002
- ULEB Cup (EuroCup) Champion: 2005
- Baltic League Champion: 2006
- Greek Cup Winner: 2007
- EuroLeague Champion: 2007
- Greek League Champion: 2007
- Triple Crown Winner: 2007

=== Lithuanian senior national team ===
- EuroBasket 2007: Bronze
- 2010 FIBA World Championship: Bronze
- EuroBasket 2013: Silver
- EuroBasket 2015: Silver

=== Personal awards ===
- 3× Lithuanian League All-Star Game: 2001, 2002, 2006
- Lithuanian League Rookie of the Year: 2001
- Lithuanian All-Star Game MVP: 2002
- EuroCup Finals MVP: 2005
- Led the Lithuanian League in blocked shots: 2006
- Led the Baltic League in blocked shots: 2006
- 2× Lithuanian League Slam Dunk Champion: 2000, 2001

=== State awards ===
- Lithuania: Recipient of the Commander's Cross of the Order for Merits to Lithuania (2007)
- Lithuania: Recipient of the Commander's Cross of the Order of the Lithuanian Grand Duke Gediminas (2010)
- Lithuania: Recipient of the Commander's Grand Cross of the Order for Merits to Lithuania (2013)

== Personal life ==
Javtokas attended to St. Vincent – St. Mary High School in Akron, Ohio, the same secondary school that LeBron James went to growing up. Javtokas also attended Bishop McGuinness High School in Winston-Salem, North Carolina, for one year of high school during the 1997–1998 school year. His older brother Artūras Javtokas is a former basketball player.

=== Motorcycle crash ===
On May 1, 2002, while driving his Honda CBR1100XX motorcycle at a speed of around 200 kilometers per hour (125 miles per hour) towards Vilnius, he had a serious accident. Approaching a side road, Javtokas started to pass a van, but the van driver did not see the motorcycle and turned left. There was no chance for Javtokas to stop and he hit the van, losing control but not the bike, which crashed into a car in the opposite lane. Javtokas flew dozens of meters and landed in bushes off the road, crushing his thighbone, breaking his shoulder, and injuring his knee and kidneys. He returned to basketball for the 2003–04 season.

== Filmography ==
Year	Title	Role	Notes	Ref
2012	The Other Dream Team	Himself	Documentary about the Lithuania men's national basketball team at the 1992 Summer Olympics.	
2012	Mes už... Lietuvą!	Himself	Documentary about the Lithuania men's national basketball team at the EuroBasket 2011.	
2023	The Captain. Paulius Jankūnas story	Himself	Documentary about Paulius Jankūnas, a long-term captain of the Žalgiris Kaunas.	
