= Eurelijus Žukauskas =

Lithuanian basketball player

Personal information
- Born: August 22, 1973 (age 53) Klaipėda, Lithuanian SSR, Soviet Union
- Listed height: 7 ft 2 in (2.18 m)
- Listed weight: 260 lb (118 kg)

Career information
- NBA draft: 1995: 2nd round, 54th overall pick
- Drafted by: Seattle SuperSonics
- Playing career: 1994–2009
- Position: Center
- Number: 11

Career history
- 1994–1997: Neptūnas Klaipėda
- 1997–2000: Žalgiris Kaunas
- 2000–2001: Paf Wennington Bologna
- 2001–2002: Lokomotiv Mineralnye Vody
- 2002–2004: UNICS Kazan
- 2004–2005: Ülker Istanbul
- 2005–2006: Olympiacos Piraeus
- 2006–2007: Lietuvos rytas Vilnius
- 2007–2009: Žalgiris Kaunas

Career highlights
- LKL Slam Dunk champion (1999); EuroLeague champion (1999); LKL Finals MVP (2000); FIBA EuroCup All-Star (2004); EuroLeague Blocks Leader (2005); 2× LKL All-Star (2008, 2009); No. 11 retired by Neptūnas Klaipėda (2014)
- Stats at Basketball Reference
Medals
Men's basketball
Representing Lithuania
Summer Olympic Games
Bronze medal – third place	1996 Atlanta
Bronze medal – third place	2000 Sydney
EuroBasket
Gold medal – first place	2003 Sweden

Eurelijus Žukauskas ([ɛʊˈrʲɛlʲɪjʊs ʒʊˈkɐ̂ˑʊskɐs], born August 22, 1973) is a retired Lithuanian professional basketball player. At a height of 2.18 m (7 ft 2 in) tall, and a weight of 118 kg (260 lb), he played at the center position.

== Professional career ==
In the 1995 NBA draft, Žukauskas was selected with the #54 draft pick by the Seattle SuperSonics, in the second round of the draft. On June 28, 1995, the Milwaukee Bucks acquired his rights from Seattle. In 2007, he signed a one-year contract with the Lithuanian club Žalgiris Kaunas, which he later renewed for another year.

He retired from playing professional basketball on May 20, 2009.

== National team career ==
Žukauskas played with the senior Lithuanian national basketball team, from 1995 to 2004.

== Post-playing career ==
Žukauskas currently plays recreational basketball in his hometown of Klaipėda, and he also acts as a judge at the Lithuanian League (LKL) Slam Dunk Contest.

== Career statistics ==
Legend
GP	Games played	GS	Games started	MPG	Minutes per game
FG%	Field-goal percentage	3P%	3-point field-goal percentage	FT%	Free-throw percentage
RPG	Rebounds per game	APG	Assists per game	SPG	Steals per game
BPG	Blocks per game	PPG	Points per game	PIR	Performance index rating
**Bold**	Career high

Led the league

=== EuroLeague ===
Year	Team	GP	GS	MPG	FG%	3P%	FT%	RPG	APG	SPG	BPG	PPG	PIR
2000–01	Paf Wennington Bologna	11	5	13.0	.392	**.1000**	**.568**	3.5	.2	**1.5**	.5	6.2	6.5
2004–05	Ülker Istanbul	**22**	**22**	**27.0**	**.636**	.000	.558	**7.0**	**.8**	.7	**1.8**	**10.7**	**15.5**
2007–08	Žalgiris	19	19	18.1	.475	.000	.353	4.4	**.8**	.3	1.4	3.6	5.4
2008–09	Žalgiris	7	2	9.2	.333	.000	.000	1.6	.6	.3	.9	1.1	1.4

== Awards and achievements ==
=== Clubs ===
- EuroLeague champion: (1999)
- 3× Lithuanian League Champion: (1998, 1999, 2008)
- Lithuanian All-Star Game Slam Dunk Contest Champion: (1999)
- FIBA Europe League Champion: (2004)
- 2× Baltic League champion: (2007, 2008)
- Lithuanian League runner-up: (2007)
- Lithuanian Cup winner: (2008)

=== Lithuanian senior national team ===
- 1996 Summer Olympic Games: Bronze
- 2000 Summer Olympic Games: Bronze
- FIBA EuroBasket 2003: Gold

=== State awards ===
- Lithuania: Recipient of the Officer's Cross of the Order of the Lithuanian Grand Duke Gediminas (1996)
- Lithuania: Recipient of the Commander's Cross of the Order of the Lithuanian Grand Duke Gediminas (2001)
- Lithuania: Recipient of the Commander's Grand Cross of the Order for Merits to Lithuania (2003)
