= LKL All-Star Day =

The LKL All-Star Day is held every year by the professional Lithuanian Basketball League (LKL). The event takes place every February, and features a variety of basketball-related events, exhibitions, and performances, culminating with the LKL All-Star Game.

== The All-Star Game ==
The All-Star Game is the main event of the day. The 2008 game, and its associated festivities, were held in Vilnius, at the Siemens Arena.

== Events of All-Star Day ==
Major events held during All-Star Day include:

- Three-point Shootout: The league's best three point shooters, shoot five shots, from five different spots around the three-point line. Each shot is worth one point, except the last ball of each rack (informally called 'money balls'), which is worth two points. The highest score available in one round is 30 points.
- Slam Dunk Contest: This competition showcases the creativity and athletic ability of some of the league's best dunkers. The specific rules of the contest are decided each year, but the competition is always judged subjectively. After each dunk, or attempted dunk, competitors are awarded a mark out of 10 from five judges, giving a possible high score of 50. The usual rules of 'traveling' and double dribbling do not apply. The dunk contest is the highlight of the weekend.

== See also ==
- Basketball in Lithuania
