= 2024 LKL Playoffs =

Basketball playoffs in Lithuania

2024 LKL playoffs
Tournament details
- Country: Lithuania
- Dates: 12 May – 12 June 2024
- Season: 2023–24
- Teams: 8
- Defending champions: Žalgiris

Final positions
- Champions: Rytas (7th title)
- Runners-up: Žalgiris
- Third place: 7Bet–Lietkabelis
- Fourth place: Wolves Twinsbet

The 2024 LKL Playoffs known as the 2024 Betsafe-LKL Playoffs for sponsorship purposes was LKL playoffs' 29th edition. Top eight finishers in the regular season will compete for the championship spot. Playoffs will begin 12 May 2024. Žalgiris was the defending champion but lost final series to Rytas who won their 7th title, returning to glory since their last triumph in 2022.

The quarterfinals will be played in a best-of-three format with higher seeded team playing the first and third (if necessary) game at home. Semifinals, third place game and final will be played in a best-of-five format, with the higher seed team playing games 1, 3 and 5 (if necessary) at home.

== Qualified teams ==
Pos	Team	Pld	W	L	PF	PA	PD	Qualification
1	Žalgiris	30	26	4	2647	2228	+419	Higher seed in playoffs
2	Rytas	30	24	6	2791	2410	+381	Higher seed in playoffs
3	Wolves	30	22	8	2613	2397	+216	Higher seed in playoffs
4	Uniclub Casino – Juventus	30	18	12	2624	2464	+160	Higher seed in playoffs
5	7Bet–Lietkabelis	30	16	14	2538	2533	+5	Lower seed in playoffs
6	Neptūnas	30	14	16	2541	2605	−64	Lower seed in playoffs
7	Cbet	30	11	19	2454	2590	−136	Lower seed in playoffs
8	M Basket-Delamode	30	11	19	2335	2530	−195	Lower seed in playoffs

Source: LKL.LT

== Notable events ==
- On 9 May 2024, all four Betsafe–LKL playoff matchups are set.

== Bracket ==
Quarter-finals
1	Žalgiris	2
8	M Basket–Delamode	0
4	Uniclub Casino – Juventus	1
5	7Bet–Lietkabelis	2
2	Rytas	2
7	Cbet	0
3	Wolves Twinsbet	2
6	Neptūnas	1

Semi-finals
1	Žalgiris	3
5	7Bet–Lietkabelis	0
2	Rytas	3
3	Wolves Twinsbet	2

Final
1	Žalgiris	1
2	Rytas	3
Third place
5	7Bet–Lietkabelis	3
3	Wolves Twinsbet	1

== Quarter–finals ==
Team 1	Series	Team 2	Game 1	Game 2	Game 3
Žalgiris	2–0	M Basket–Delamode	97–61	76–58	–
Uniclub Casino – Juventus	1–2	7Bet–Lietkabelis	77–84	89–88	99–100
Rytas	2–0	Cbet	110–77	96–60	–
Wolves Twinsbet	2–1	Neptūnas	91–84	76–95	91–80

=== Žalgiris vs. M Basket–Delamode ===
12 May 2024 Game 1	Žalgiris	97–61 (Series: 1–0)	M Basket–Delamode	Kėdainiai
16:00 (EEST)	Scoring by quarter: 17–26, 25–15, 28–5, 27–15
	Pts: Birutis, Rivers 14; Rebs: Hayes 7 Asts: Evans 8 PIR: Birutis 21	Boxscore	Pts: Staniulis 16; Rebs: Staniulis, Tubutis 8 Asts: Paliukėnas 6 PIR: Staniulis 16	Arena: Kėdainiai Arena; Attendance: 909; Referees: Juozas Barkauskas, Aurimas Borusas, Darius Šomka

14 May 2024 Game 2	M Basket–Delamode	58–76 (Series: 0–2)	Žalgiris	Telšiai
18:00 (EEST)	Scoring by quarter: 14–23, 22–17, 10–18, 12–18
	Pts: Collins, Gecevičius 12; Rebs: Staniulis 8 Asts: Paliukėnas 7 PIR: Tubutis 18	Boxscore	Pts: Birutis 15; Rebs: Hayes 12; Asts: Manek 8 PIR: Birutis 21	Arena: Telšiai sports arena Attendance: 1,021; Referees: Jurgis Laurinavičius, Andžej Urbanovič, Dovydas Kairys

=== Uniclub Casino – Juventus vs. 7Bet–Lietkabelis ===
12 May 2024 Game 1	Uniclub Casino – Juventus	77–84 (Series: 0–1)	7Bet–Lietkabelis	Utena
17:20 (EEST)	Scoring by quarter: 17–22, 20–16, 23–27, 17–19
	Pts: Vraneš 15; Rebs: Smith 4 Asts: Smith 7 PIR: Vraneš 19	Boxscore	Pts: Sirvydis 22; Rebs: Gagić 10; Asts: Orelik 6 PIR: Sirvydis 25	Arena: Utena Arena; Attendance: 2,382; Referees: Gytis Vilius, Jurgis Laurinavičius, Gvidas Gedvilas

14 May 2024 Game 2	7Bet–Lietkabelis	88–89 (Series: 1–1)	Uniclub Casino – Juventus	Panevėžys
18:50 (EEST)	Scoring by quarter: 20–24, 26–22, 16–23, 26–20
	Pts: Sirvydis 26; Rebs: Baldwin 5 Asts: Baldwin, Varnas 4 PIR: Sirvydis 25	Boxscore	Pts: Starks 21; Rebs: Starks 6 Asts: Starks 5 PIR: Starks 25	Arena: Kalnapilio Arena; Attendance: 2,396

17 May 2024 Game 3	Uniclub Casino – Juventus	99–100(OT) (Series: 1–2)	7Bet–Lietkabelis	Utena
18:50 (EEST)	Scoring by quarter: 18–23, 25–25, 17–20, 28–20, Overtime: 11–12
	Pts: Smith 24; Rebs: Šaulys 8 Asts: Smith 8 PIR: Smith 38	Boxscore	Pts: Sirvydis 20; Rebs: Lipkevičius 6 Asts: Orelik 4 PIR: Orelik 20	Arena: Utena Arena; Attendance: 2,496; Referees: Gytis Vilius, Artūras Šukys, Gvidas Gedvilas

=== Rytas vs. Cbet ===
13 May 2024 Game 1	Rytas	110–77 (Series: 1–0)	Cbet	Vilnius
18:50 (EEST)	Scoring by quarter: 22–28, 29–18, 28–22, 31–9
	Pts: Foster 23; Rebs: Echodas 6 Asts: Cole 5 PIR: Foster 25	Boxscore	Pts: Drame, Larson 17; Rebs: Drame 9 Asts: Furmanavičius 5 PIR: Drame 22	Arena: Jeep Arena; Attendance: 2,016; Referees: Gvidas Gedvilas, Andžej Urbanovič, Dovydas Kairys

15 May 2024 Game 2	Cbet	90–96 (Series: 0–2)	Rytas	Jonava
18:00 (EEST)	Scoring by quarter: 23–20, 30–21, 22–28, 15–27
	Pts: Larson 18; Rebs: Drame 7 Asts: Šeškus 8 PIR: Drame 29	Boxscore	Pts: Foster 25; Rebs: Echodas 12; Asts: Gorham 5 PIR: Echodas 24	Arena: Jonava Arena; Attendance: 946; Referees: Saulius Račys, Gabrielius Simonavičius, Darius Šomka

=== Wolves Twinsbet vs. Neptūnas ===
13 May 2024 Game 1	Wolves Twinsbet	91–84 (Series: 1–0)	Neptūnas	Vilnius
19:30 (EEST)	Scoring by quarter: 31–22, 14–20, 19–21, 27–21
	Pts: Sulaimon 17; Rebs: Miniotas, Taylor 7 Asts: Taylor 4 PIR: Brooks 21	Boxscore	Pts: Gailius 18; Rebs: Tubelis 10; Asts: Janavičius 5 PIR: Girdžiūnas, Pacevičius 16	Arena: Twinsbet Arena; Attendance: 2,759; Referees: Artūras Šukys, Gintaras Mačiulis, Gabrielius Simonavičius

15 May 2024 Game 2	Neptūnas	95–76 (Series: 1–1)	Wolves Twinsbet	Klaipėda
18:50 (EEST)	Scoring by quarter: 30–23, 23–23, 26–10, 16–20
	Pts: Tubelis 17; Rebs: Tubelis 9 Asts: Newkirk 5 PIR: Tubelis 26	Boxscore	Pts: Žukauskas 20; Rebs: Mekowulu 7 Asts: Kariniauskas 4 PIR: Žukauskas 20	Arena: Švyturys Arena; Attendance: 2,639; Referees: Gytis Vilius, Gvidas Gedvilas, Aurimas Borusas

18 May 2024 Game 3	Wolves Twinsbet	91–80 (Series: 2–1)	Neptūnas	Vilnius
17:20 (EEST)	Scoring by quarter: 26–16, 14–15, 24–26, 27–23
	Pts: Žemaitis 26; Rebs: Miniotas 11; Asts: Taylor, Sulaimon 6 PIR: Žemaitis 33	Boxscore	Pts: Sargiūnas 27; Rebs: Tubelis 7 Asts: Tubelis 3 PIR: Sargiūnas 25	Arena: Twinsbet Arena; Attendance: 2,783; Referees: Saulius Račys, Jurgis Laurinavičius, Juozas Barkauskas

== Semi–finals ==
Team 1	Series	Team 2	Game 1	Game 2	Game 3	Game 4	Game 5
Žalgiris	3–0	7Bet–Lietkabelis	93–72	90–89	88–79	–	–
Rytas	3–2	Wolves Twinsbet	85–96	113–75	86–78	86–97	92–86

=== Žalgiris vs. 7Bet–Lietkabelis ===
21 May 2024 Game 1	Žalgiris	93–72 (Series: 1–0)	7Bet–Lietkabelis	Kaunas
18:50 (EEST)	Scoring by quarter: 33–14, 15–24, 18–22, 27–12
	Pts: Evans 15; Rebs: Manek 6 Asts: Lekavičius 5 PIR: Evans 17	Boxscore	Pts: Orelik 22; Rebs: Gagić 7 Asts: four players 3 PIR: Orelik 22	Arena: Žalgirio Arena; Attendance: 3,649; Referees: Jurgis Laurinavičius, Gvidas Gedvilas, Gabrielius Simonavičius

23 May 2024 Game 2	7Bet–Lietkabelis	89–90 (Series: 0–2)	Žalgiris	Panevėžys
18:50 (EEST)	Scoring by quarter: 22–16, 17–22, 29–23, 21–29
	Pts: Orelik, Sirvydis 19; Rebs: Lipkevičius, Sirvydis 6 Asts: Orelik 5 PIR: Orelik 25	Boxscore	Pts: Evans 27; Rebs: Hayes 6 Asts: Ulanovas 5 PIR: Evans 29	Arena: Kalnapilio Arena; Attendance: 2,638

26 May 2024 Game 3	Žalgiris	88–79 (Series: 3–0)	7Bet–Lietkabelis	Kaunas
17:20 (EEST)	Scoring by quarter: 18–18, 21–26, 24–10, 25–25
	Pts: Lekavičius 18; Rebs: Hayes 5 Asts: Ulanovas 7 PIR: Lekavičius 21	Boxscore	Pts: Sirvydis 25; Rebs: Gagić 11; Asts: Baldwin 5 PIR: Sirvydis 28	Arena: Žalgirio Arena; Attendance: 4,112; Referees: Gytis Vilius, Andžej Urbanovič, Aurimas Borusas

=== Rytas vs. Wolves Twinsbet ===
22 May 2024 Game 1	Rytas	85–96 (Series: 0–1)	Wolves Twinsbet	Vilnius
18:50 (EEST)	Scoring by quarter: 17–28, 24–18, 17–26, 27–24
	Pts: Radzevičius 16; Rebs: Gorham 9 Asts: Cole 5 PIR: Radzevičius 25	Boxscore	Pts: Sulaimon 18; Rebs: Žemaitis, Žukauskas 7 Asts: Sulaimon 5 PIR: Sulaimon 20	Arena: Twinsbet Arena; Attendance: 4,019; Referees: Gytis Vilius, Artūras Šukys, Gintaras Mačiulis

24 May 2024 Game 2	Wolves Twinsbet	75–113 (Series: 1–1)	Rytas	Vilnius
18:50 (EEST)	Scoring by quarter: 22–32, 22–29, 20–36, 11–16
	Pts: Sulaimon 16; Rebs: Miniotas, Kozys 4 Asts: Žagars 5 PIR: Sulaimon 15	Boxscore	Pts: Radzevičius 16; Rebs: three players 8 Asts: Radzevičius 5 PIR: Echodas 27	Arena: Twinsbet Arena; Attendance: 5,878; Referees: Gytis Vilius, Jurgis Laurinavičius, Gvidas Gedvilas

27 May 2024 Game 3	Rytas	86–78 (Series: 2–1)	Wolves Twinsbet	Vilnius
18:50 (EEST)	Scoring by quarter: 17–16, 22–27, 27–15, 20–20
	Pts: Foster 18; Rebs: three players 5 Asts: three players 3 PIR: Gorham 21	Boxscore	Pts: Sulaimon 32; Rebs: Thurman 7 Asts: Taylor, Thurman 2 PIR: Sulaimon 30	Arena: Twinsbet Arena; Attendance: 3,468; Referees: Jurgis Laurinavičius, Gvidas Gedvilas, Juozas Barkauskas

30 May 2024 Game 4	Wolves Twinsbet	97–86 (Series: 2–2)	Rytas	Vilnius
18:50 (EEST)	Scoring by quarter: 24–23, 28–15, 26–12, 19–36
	Pts: Žagars 18; Rebs: Mekowulu 10; Asts: Žagars 7 PIR: Žagars 22	Boxscore	Pts: Gorham 16; Rebs: DeLaurier 7 Asts: Cole 4 PIR: Velička 17	Arena: Twinsbet Arena; Attendance: 2,920; Referees: Gytis Vilius, Saulius Račys, Dovydas Kairys

1 June 2024 Game 5	Rytas	92–86 (Series: 3–2)	Wolves Twinsbet	Vilnius
17:20 (EEST)	Scoring by quarter: 23–28, 25–17, 27–19, 17–22
	Pts: Foster 27; Rebs: Echodas 13; Asts: Cole 5 PIR: Echodas 35	Boxscore	Pts: Miniotas 25; Rebs: Miniotas 9 Asts: Sulaimon, Žagars 4 PIR: Miniotas 36	Arena: Twinsbet Arena; Attendance: 4,212; Referees: Gytis Vilius, Jurgis Laurinavičius, Gvidas Gedvilas

== Third place ==
Team 1	Series	Team 2	Game 1	Game 2	Game 3	Game 4	Game 5
Wolves Twinsbet	1–3	7Bet–Lietkabelis	84–86	81–73	84–91	87–98	–

=== Wolves Twinsbet vs. 7Bet–Lietkabelis ===
4 June 2024 Game 1	Wolves Twinsbet	84–86 (Series: 0–1)	7Bet–Lietkabelis	Vilnius
18:50 (EEST)	Scoring by quarter: 27–21, 21–17, 23–25, 13–23
	Pts: Thurman 21; Rebs: Thurman 9 Asts: Miniotas, Žukauskas 4 PIR: Thurman 27	Boxscore	Pts: Sirvydis 25; Rebs: Maldūnas 6 Asts: Maldūnas, Orelik 4 PIR: Sirvydis 31	Arena: Twinsbet Arena; Attendance: 2,079; Referees: Saulius Račys, Jurgis Laurinavičius, Dovydas Kairys

6 June 2024 Game 2	7Bet–Lietkabelis	73–81 (Series: 1–1)	Wolves Twinsbet	Panevėžys
18:50 (EEST)	Scoring by quarter: 17–21, 14–20, 18–20, 24–20
	Pts: Sirvydis 19; Rebs: Gagić, Orelik 7 Asts: Orelik 3 PIR: Gagić, Sirvydis 19	Boxscore	Pts: Miniotas 17; Rebs: Miniotas 9 Asts: Žagars 6 PIR: Miniotas 25	Arena: Kalnapilio Arena; Attendance: 3,169; Referees: Gytis Vilius, Gvidas Gedvilas, Gintaras Mačiulis

9 June 2024 Game 3	Wolves Twinsbet	84–91 (Series: 1–2)	7Bet–Lietkabelis	Vilnius
17:20 (EEST)	Scoring by quarter: 21–24, 25–21, 15–18, 23–28
	Pts: Miniotas, Thurman 16; Rebs: Thurman 9 Asts: Žemaitis 8 PIR: Thurman 22	Boxscore	Pts: Orelik 20; Rebs: Gagić 7 Asts: Bičkauskis 6 PIR: Orelik 19	Arena: Twinsbet Arena; Attendance: 2,711; Referees: Jurgis Laurinavičius, Gvidas Gedvilas, Juozas Barkauskas

11 June 2024 Game 4	7Bet–Lietkabelis	98–87 (Series: 3–1)	Wolves Twinsbet	Panevėžys
18:50 (EEST)	Scoring by quarter: 23–30, 25–21, 24–15, 26–21
	Pts: Sirvydis 20; Rebs: Gagić 15; Asts: Varnas 6 PIR: Gagić 31	Boxscore	Pts: Miniotas 22; Rebs: Miniotas 9 Asts: Žagars 6 PIR: Miniotas 27	Arena: Kalnapilio Arena; Attendance: 3,682; Referees: Gytis Vilius, Jurgis Laurinavičius, Juozas Barkauskas

== Finals ==
Road to the final
Žalgiris		Round	Rytas	
1st place (26–4)		Regular season	2nd place (24–6)	
Opponent	Series	Playoffs	Opponent	Series
M Basket–Delamode	2–0	Quarterfinals	Cbet	2–0
7Bet–Lietkabelis	3–0	Semifinals	Wolves Twinsbet	3–2

Team 1	Series	Team 2	Game 1	Game 2	Game 3	Game 4	Game 5
Žalgiris	1–3	Rytas	88–89	94–104	91–81	87–88	–

=== Žalgiris vs. Rytas ===
5 June 2024 Game 1	Žalgiris	88–89(OT) (Series: 0–1)	Rytas	Kaunas
18:50 (EEST)	Scoring by quarter: 17–19, 19–24, 20–11, 21–23, Overtime: 11–12
	Pts: Lekavičius 21; Rebs: Birutis 7 Asts: Lekavičius 4 PIR: Lekavičius 26	Boxscore	Pts: Radzevičius 19; Rebs: Echodas 12; Asts: Foster, Normantas 4 PIR: Radzevičius 20	Arena: Žalgirio Arena; Attendance: 8,280; Referees: Gytis Vilius, Saulius Račys, Gvidas Gedvilas

7 June 2024 Game 2	Rytas	104–94(OT) (Series: 2–0)	Žalgiris	Vilnius
18:50 (EEST)	Scoring by quarter: 19–30, 25–20, 27–17, 16–20, Overtime: 17–7
	Pts: Normantas 26; Rebs: Radzevičius 8 Asts: Cole 7 PIR: Normantas 25	Boxscore	Pts: Birutis 24; Rebs: Birutis, Ulanovas 6 Asts: Lekavičius 5 PIR: Birutis 36	Arena: Twinsbet Arena; Attendance: 8,296; Referees: Saulius Račys, Jurgis Laurinavičius, Juozas Barkauskas

10 June 2024 Game 3	Žalgiris	91–81 (Series: 1–2)	Rytas	Kaunas
18:50 (EEST)	Scoring by quarter: 25–15, 22–21, 19–20, 25–25
	Pts: Sumner 22; Rebs: Šmits 8 Asts: Lekavičius 4 PIR: Lekavičius, Ulanovas 20	Boxscore	Pts: Foster 25; Rebs: Echodas 7 Asts: Cole 6 PIR: Echodas 22	Arena: Žalgirio Arena; Attendance: 12,321; Referees: Gytis Vilius, Jurgis Laurinavičius, Gvidas Gedvilas

12 June 2024 Game 4	Rytas	88–87 (Series: 3–1)	Žalgiris	Vilnius
18:50 (EEST)	Scoring by quarter: 23–24, 28–24, 19–17, 18–22
	Pts: Foster 33; Rebs: Echodas 6 Asts: Cole, Normantas 6 PIR: Foster 31	Boxscore	Pts: Sumner 21; Rebs: Birutis 9 Asts: Sumner 6 PIR: Birutis 28	Arena: Twinsbet Arena; Attendance: 9,149; Referees: Gytis Vilius, Gvidas Gedvilas, Juozas Barkauskas

2023–24 LKL champions
Rytas
(7th title)
