= 2022–23 LKL season =

30th season of the top-tier level professional basketball league of Lithuania

Betsafe-LKL
- Season: 2022–23
- Duration: 24 September 2022 – 9 May 2023 (Regular season); 12 May 2023 – 10 June 2023 (Playoffs)
- Games played: 224
- Teams: 12

Regular season
- Season MVP: (United States) Ahmad Caver

Finals
- Champions: Žalgiris (24th title)
- Runners-up: Rytas
- Third place: 7Bet–Lietkabelis
- Fourth place: Cbet
- Finals MVP: (United States) Isaiah Taylor

Statistical leaders
Points	(United States) Ahmad Caver	17.09
Rebounds	(United States) Austin Wiley	8.91
Assists	(Lithuania) Donatas Sabeckis	7.00
Index Rating	(United States) Ahmad Caver	20.33

Records
- Biggest home win: Rytas 118–73 Pieno žvaigždės (29 March 2023)
- Biggest away win: Labas Gas 57–94 Žalgiris (3 April 2023)
- Highest scoring: Nevėžis–Optibet 143–134 Uniclub Casino – Juventus (22 April 2023)
- Winning streak: 10 games Žalgiris
- Losing streak: 16 games Labas Gas
- Highest attendance: 14,077; Žalgiris 97–87 Rytas (10 June 2023)
- Lowest attendance: 100; Pieno žvaigždės 78–87 Neptūnas (22 April 2023)
- Average attendance: 1,667

Seasons
- ← 2021–22 2023–24 →

The 2022–23 Lietuvos krepšinio lyga, also called Betsafe-LKL for sponsorship reasons, was the 30th season of the top-tier level professional basketball league of Lithuania, the Lietuvos krepšinio lyga (LKL). Rytas were defending champions, however, they finished as a runners-up, losing finals series to eventual champions Žalgiris.

== Teams ==
=== Location and arenas ===
On 20 May 2022, during 2021–22 LKL season LKL board decided to expand the number of participating teams in tournament. The number of teams has been expanded to 12 teams. 2021-22 NKL season champions Gargždai and new team Wolves will join the other 10 existing LKL teams.

Location of teams in 2022–23 LKL

Team	Location	Arena	Capacity
Cbet Jonava	Jonava	Jonava Arena	2,200
Gargždai	Palanga	Palanga Arena	1,200
Labas Gas	Prienai	Prienai Arena	1,500
7bet-Lietkabelis	Panevėžys	Cido/Kalnapilio Arena	5,950
Neptūnas	Klaipėda	Švyturys Arena	6,200
Nevėžis-OPTIBET	Kėdainiai	Kėdainiai Arena	2,200
Pieno žvaigždės	Pasvalys	Pieno žvaigždės Arena	1,500
Rytas	Vilnius	Jeep Arena	2,500
Šiauliai	Šiauliai	Šiauliai Arena	5,700
Uniclub Casino – Juventus	Utena	Utena Arena	2,000
Wolves	Alytus	Alytus Arena	5,500
Žalgiris	Kaunas	Žalgiris Arena	15,415
Žalgiris	Prienai	Prienai Arena	1,500
Žalgiris	Garliava	Garliava Sports and Culture Center	1,300

== Regular season ==
=== League table ===
Pos	Team	Pld	W	L	PF	PA	PD	Qualification or relegation
1	Žalgiris	33	28	5	2875	2406	+469	Advance to playoffs
2	Rytas	33	27	6	3070	2731	+339	Advance to playoffs
3	Wolves	33	23	10	2851	2599	+252	Advance to playoffs
4	7Bet–Lietkabelis	33	23	10	2834	2689	+145	Advance to playoffs
5	Uniclub Casino – Juventus	33	18	15	2859	2853	+6	Advance to playoffs
6	Cbet	33	18	15	2657	2663	−6	Advance to playoffs
7	Neptūnas	33	16	17	2652	2722	−70	Advance to playoffs
8	Nevėžis–Optibet	33	14	19	2860	2912	−52	Advance to playoffs
9	Šiauliai	33	13	20	2744	2852	−108	
10	Pieno žvaigždės	33	8	25	2632	2963	−331	
11	Gargždai	33	6	27	2501	2785	−284	
12	Labas Gas (R)	33	4	29	2613	2973	−360	Relegation to NKL

Source: LKL.lT
(R) Relegated

=== Results ===
Home \ Away	LIE	JSK	GAR	PRI	NEP	NEV	PZV	RYT	SIA	JUV	WOL	ZAL
7Bet–Lietkabelis	—	86–84	82–73	74–86	80–73	111–108	86–74	79–70	94–103	91–71	92–96	66–74
7Bet–Lietkabelis	—	85–72	—	81–75	73–81	—	95–90	—	—	—	—	87–85
Cbet	88–91	—	92–85	74–85	83–66	71–64	84–77	62–75	74–82	82–84	80–62	75–80
Cbet	—	—	67–65	—	—	89–78	—	81–106	—	76–88	74–85	82–89
Gargždai	71–91	68–69	—	74–71	54–73	71–73	79–69	81–99	76–78	68–85	68–73	71–89
Gargždai	65–86	—	—	—	—	73–87	—	—	56–60	77–76	85–82	—
Labas Gas	77–96	74–80	68–95	—	92–99	86–98	89–92	66–89	63–81	68–92	78–88	66–91
Labas Gas	—	69–72	90–77	—	84–94	—	85–91	86–97	—	—	—	57–94
Neptūnas	73–86	77–93	94–69	80–75	—	86–79	91–92	70–82	93–79	98–97	100–80	71–79
Neptūnas	—	76–70	91–86	—	—	97–91	—	86–90	—	—	75–104	80–91
Nevėžis–Optibet	73–78	91–83	99–92	89–81	67–71	—	83–65	84–86	81–92	71–74	76–81	69–97
Nevėžis–Optibet	77–90	—	—	112–105	—	—	—	—	91–81	143–134	81–88	—
Pieno žvaigždės	71–77	90–92	97–92	115–110	91–85	84–93	—	72–107	75–76	80–87	71–90	59–92
Pieno žvaigždės	—	98–100	89–78	—	78–87	98–88	—	75–104	—	—	—	61–88
Rytas	109–104	71–78	102–72	98–77	93–67	88–92	118–73	—	107–101	77–88	76–88	89–85
Rytas	92–91	—	91–65	—	—	99–93	—	—	109–84	103–101	102–98	—
Šiauliai	85–88	85–89	92–99	97–89	61–60	95–107	81–65	80–85	—	85–92	107–102	75–93
Šiauliai	80–89	73–84	—	114–87	87–89	—	95–89	—	—	—	—	—
Uniclub Casino – Juventus	87–84	88–78	92–90	94–76	95–77	84–85	93–77	88–90	85–84	—	81–86	67–78
Uniclub Casino – Juventus	91–93	—	—	86–90	85–83	—	84–81	—	89–80	—	—	—
Wolves	80–86	94–99	96–82	79–70	79–63	94–73	76–69	89–91	89–78	95–68	—	80–75
Wolves	70–65	—	—	94–58	—	—	94–63	—	83–73	106–79	—	—
Žalgiris	85–77	76–80	86–74	86–80	77–46	93–75	84–61	94–100	96–60	109–76	90–85	—
Žalgiris	—	—	96–70	—	—	95–89	—	81–75	84–60	92–78	71–65	—

Source: LKL.LT
Legend: Blue = home team win; Red = away team win.
Matches with lighter background shading were decided after overtime.

== Playoffs ==
Quarterfinals will be played in a best–of–three format, while the semifinals, third place game and final in a best-of-five format.

=== Bracket ===
Quarterfinals
Žalgiris	90	92	–
Nevėžis–Optibet	71	86	–
7Bet–Lietkabelis	85	77	101
Uniclub Casino – Juventus	73	86	99
Rytas	107	95	–
Neptūnas	99	91	–
Wolves	76	75	–
Cbet	80	80	–

Semifinals
Žalgiris	69	86	66	95	–
7Bet–Lietkabelis	58	83	67	66	–
Rytas	82	82	90	–	–
Cbet	74	67	85	–	–

Finals
Žalgiris	108	71	95	68	97
Rytas	93	94	80	69	87
Third place
7Bet–Lietkabelis	80	88	63	75	84
Cbet	89	87	82	55	72

2022–23 LKL champions
Žalgiris
(24th title)

== Final standings ==
Pos	Team	Pld	W	L	Qualification or relegation
1	Žalgiris (C)	44	36	8	Already qualified to EuroLeague
2	Rytas	43	34	9	Qualification to Champions League regular season
3	7Bet–Lietkabelis	45	29	16	Qualification to EuroCup
4	Cbet	43	22	21	Qualification to Champions League qualifying rounds
5	Wolves	35	23	12	Qualification to EuroCup
6	Uniclub Casino – Juventus	36	19	17	
7	Neptūnas	35	16	19	
8	Nevėžis–Optibet	35	14	21	
9	Šiauliai	33	13	20	
10	Pieno žvaigždės	33	8	25	
11	Gargždai	33	6	27	
12	Labas Gas (R)	33	4	29	Relegation to NKL

Source: LKL.lT
(C) Champions; (R) Relegated

== Statistics ==
=== Average attendances ===
Pos	Team	Total	High	Low	Average	Change
1	Žalgiris	105,346	14,077	461	4,580	+99.2%
2	Lietkabelis	50,865	3,970	1,099	2,211	+15.7%
3	Wolves	33,513	3,957	1,145	1,971	n/a^{1}
4	Rytas	39,120	2,579	1,015	1,778	−16.8%
5	Šiauliai	28,007	5,037	991	1,750	−17.3%
6	Neptūnas	28,543	4,422	511	1,585	+65.6%
7	Cbet Jonava	26,844	2,200	631	1,278	+63.2%
8	Uniclub Casino – Juventus	21,618	2,632	723	1,271	+43.9%
9	Nevėžis-OPTIBET	15,126	2,195	450	889	+61.3%
10	Gargždai	10,719	1,313	294	669	+604.2%^{2}
11	Labas GAS	8,030	1,100	155	472	+49.4%
12	Pieno žvaigždės	5,860	1,250	100	344	−0.3%
	League total	373,591	14,077	100	1,667	+34.5%

Source: LKL.LT
Notes:
1: Team will make its debut.
2: Team played last season in NKL.

=== Individual statistics ===
==== Rating ====
Rank	Name	Team	Games	Rating	PIR
1.	(United States) Ahmad Caver	Wolves	33	671	20.33
2.	(United States) Jeff Garrett	Cbet Jonava	43	822	19.12
3.	(Lithuania) Martynas Echodas	Rytas	23	439	19.09

Source: LKL.LT

==== Points ====
Rank	Name	Team	Games	Points	PPG
1.	(United States) Ahmad Caver	Wolves	33	564	17.09
2.	(United States) Deshawn Freeman	Nevėžis–OPTIBET	21	351	16.71
3.	(United States) Marcus Foster	Rytas	37	612	16.54

Source: LKL.LT

==== Rebounds ====
Rank	Name	Team	Games	Rebounds	RPG
1.	(United States) Austin Wiley	Neptūnas	23	205	8.91
2.	(Lithuania) Giedrius Staniulis	Gargždai	26	198	7.62
3.	(Belgium) Tim Lambrecht	Nevėžis–OPTIBET	35	264	7.54

Source: LKL.LT

==== Assists ====
Rank	Name	Team	Games	Assists	APG
1.	(Lithuania) Donatas Sabeckis	Šiauliai	31	217	7.00
2.	(Lithuania) Žygimantas Janavičius	Neptūnas	32	192	6.03
3.	(United States) Ahmad Caver	Wolves	33	191	5.79

Source: LKL.LT

==== Other statistics ====
Category	Player	Team	Games	Average
Steals	(United States) Alex Hamilton	Uniclub Casino – Juventus	21	2.52
Blocks	(United States) Reggie Lynch	Uniclub Casino – Juventus	21	2.24
Turnovers	(United States) Joshua Newkirk	Gargždai	33	3.18
Fouls drawn	(Latvia) Artūrs Žagars	Nevėžis–OPTIBET	22	5.50
Minutes	(United States) Joshua Newkirk	Gargždai	33	32:41
FT %	(Serbia) Stefan Peno	Lietkabelis	24	94.12%
2-Point %	(Lithuania) Laurynas Birutis	Žalgiris	42	75.46%
3-Point %	(United States) Kevarrius Hayes	Žalgiris	42	50.00%
3-Point %	(Lithuania) Julius Jucikas	Pieno žvaigždės	20	50.00%

Source: LKL.LT

=== Individual game highs ===
Category	Player	Team	Opponent	Statistic
Rating	(Belgium) Tim Lambrecht	Nevėžis–OPTIBET	Labas Gas (Mar 25, 2023)	45
Points	(Lithuania) Mindaugas Girdžiūnas	Neptūnas	Nevėžis–OPTIBET (Dec 12, 2022)	40
Rebounds	(United States) Austin Wiley	Neptūnas	Labas Gas (Dec 21, 2022)	24
Assists	(Lithuania) Donatas Sabeckis	Šiauliai	Nevėžis–OPTIBET (May 8, 2023)	14
Steals	(Lithuania) Evaldas Šaulys	Pieno žvaigždės	Uniclub Casino – Juventus (Dec 22, 2022)	7
Steals	(United States) Alex Hamilton	Uniclub Casino – Juventus	Žalgiris (Feb 15, 2023)	7
Blocks	(United States) Reggie Lynch	Uniclub Casino – Juventus	Labas Gas (Mar 18, 2023)	9

Source: LKL.LT

=== Team statistics ===
Category	Team	Average
Rating	Rytas	105.98
Points	Rytas	91.84
Rebounds	Rytas	37.88
Assists	Žalgiris	20.70
Steals	Cbet Jonava	8.93
Blocks	Neptūnas	3.23
Turnovers	Uniclub Casino – Juventus	15.78
FT %	Žalgiris	78.55%
2-Point %	Žalgiris	60.32%
3-Point %	Wolves	38.08%

Source: LKL.LT

== Awards ==
All official awards of the 2022-23 LKL season.

=== Regular Season MVP ===
Pos.	Player	Team	Source
PG	(United States) Ahmad Caver	Wolves	

=== LKL Finals MVP ===
Pos.	Player	Team	Source
PG	(United States) Isaiah Taylor	Žalgiris	

=== All-LKL Team ===
Pos.	Player	Team	Source
PG	(United States) Ahmad Caver	Wolves	
SG	(United States) Marcus Foster	Rytas	
SF	(United States) Jeffery Garrett	Cbet Jonava	
PF	(Lithuania) Martynas Echodas	Rytas	
C	(Lithuania) Laurynas Birutis	Žalgiris	

=== Coach of the Year ===
Coach	Team	Source
(Lithuania) Virginijus Šeškus	Cbet Jonava	

=== Breakthrough of the Year ===
Player	Team	Source
(Lithuania) Matas Jogėla	Neptūnas	

=== Referee of the year ===
Referee	Source
(Lithuania) Gytis Vilius	

=== "Fair play" award for gentlemanliness in sport and life ===
Team	Source
Žalgiris	

=== Player of the month ===
Month	Player	Team	PIR	Source
2022
October	(United States) Jeff Garrett	Cbet Jonava	19.8	
November	(Lithuania) Giedrius Staniulis	Gargždai	23.5	
December	(Lithuania) Gytis Radzevičius	Rytas	25.7	
2023
January	(Lithuania) Martynas Echodas	Rytas	27	
February	(United States) Deshawn Freeman	Nevėžis–OPTIBET	28	
March	(Belgium) Tim Lambrecht	Nevėžis–OPTIBET	31.5	
April	(Belgium) Tim Lambrecht	Nevėžis–OPTIBET	22.9	

== Lithuanian clubs in European competitions ==
Team	Competition	Progress
Žalgiris	EuroLeague	Playoffs
Lietkabelis	EuroCup	Eighthfinals
Rytas	Champions League	Round of 16
Šiauliai	Champions League	Qualifying rounds
Cbet Jonava	FIBA Europe Cup	Qualifying rounds
Wolves	FIBA Europe Cup	Qualifying rounds

== Lithuanian clubs in Regional competitions ==
Team	Competition	Progress
Wolves	European North Basketball League	Runners-up
Šiauliai	European North Basketball League	Regular Season
