= Nenad Čanak (basketball) =

Serbian basketball player (born 1976)

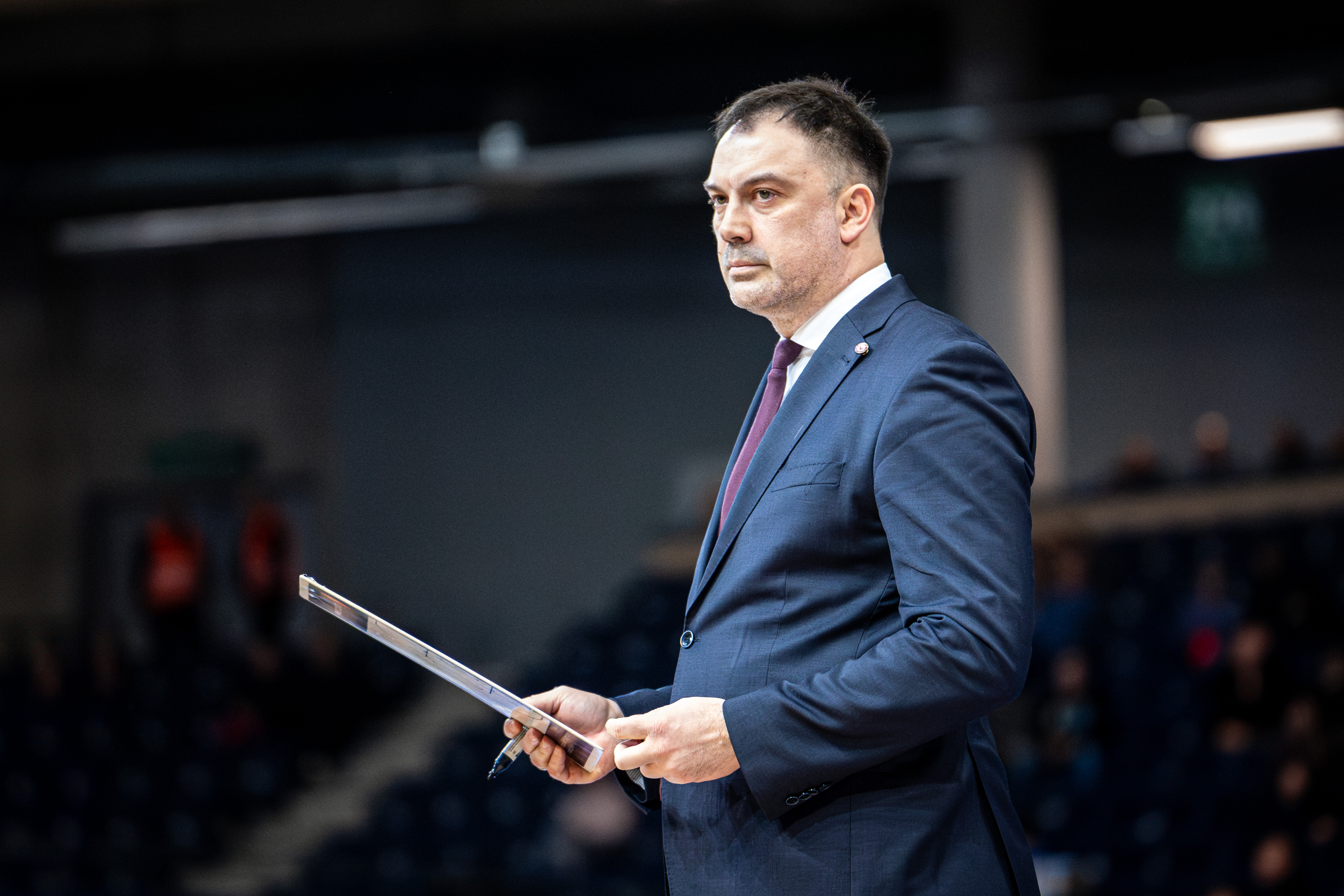

Lietkabelis Panevėžys
- Title: Head coach
- League: LKL; EuroCup

Personal information
- Born: April 24, 1976 (age 50) Zagreb, SR Croatia, Yugoslavia
- Listed height: 2.04 m (6 ft 8 in)
- Listed weight: 98 kg (216 lb)

Career information
- NBA draft: 1998: undrafted
- Playing career: 1993–2012
- Position: Forward
- Number: 13, 15
- Coaching career: 2012–present

Career history

Playing
- 1993–1994: Partizan
- 1994–1995: Kikinda
- 1995–1999: Spartak Subotica
- 1999–2003: Partizan
- 2003–2004: NIS Vojvodina
- 2004–2005: Makedonikos
- 2005–2007: Alba Berlin
- 2007–2008: Lukoil Academic
- 2009: Khimik
- 2009: Gryfony Symferopil
- 2009: Tamiš
- 2010: PVSK Panthers
- 2010–2011: AEK Larnaca
- 2011–2012: Železničar Inđija

Coaching
- 2012–2016: Mega Basket (assistant)
- 2015–2017: Serbia U20 (assistant)
- 2016–2017: Partizan (assistant)
- 2017: Spartak Subotica
- 2017–2018: Partizan
- 2018–2023: Lietkabelis Panevėžys
- 2023: Türk Telekom
- 2023–present: Lietkabelis Panevėžys

Career highlights
- As player: 2× YUBA League champion (2002, 2003); 3× Yugoslav Cup winner (1994, 2000, 2002); German Cup winner (2006); Bulgarian League champion (2008); Bulgarian Cup winner (2008); As head coach: Serbian Cup winner (2018)
Medals
Men's basketball
Representing FR Yugoslavia
'22 & under' World Championship
Bronze medal – third place	1997 Australia	Team

Nenad Čanak (Serbian Cyrillic: Ненад Чанак; born April 24, 1976) is a Serbian professional basketball coach and former player. He is currently the head coach for Lietkabelis Panevėžys of the Lithuanian Basketball League (LKL) and the EuroCup.

== Professional career ==
Čanak started his career in Partizan making his debut in the 1993–94 season. After that in the period between 1995 and 1999 Čanak was in the lines of the Serbian club Spartak Subotica. Then he came back again to wear the jersey of Partizan until 2003, demonstrating very good skills and participating in three tournaments – the YUBA League, the Adriatic League and the Euroleague. In 2002 he made a double-double, winning both the national championship and the Cup of FR Yugoslavia.

The career of the forward continued in NIS Vojvodina (2003–2004) and in the Greek Makedonikos (2004–2005). He has registered participation in all club tournaments in Europe – FIBA Europe League with Vojvodina, and ULEB Cup with Makedonikos and Alba Berlin.

In the summer of 2005, Čanak signed a contract with ALBA Berlin. During his first season in Germany he scored an average of 9,3 points, 3,2 rebounds and 1,3 assists in 43 games of the Bundesliga and an average of 8,3 points, 4,1 rebounds in 10 games in the ULEB Cup competition. In April 2007, Čanak suffered an injury and had been recovering in the next two months. In the 2006–07 season he took part in 11 games of ULEB and made an average of 5,6 points and 2,0 rebounds per game, while in the Bundesliga he had 33 games with 4,8 points per game. While wearing the jersey of Alba Berlin, he won the German Cup in 2006.

In the 2007–08 season he played with Bulgarian club Lukoil Academic. Čanak helped Lukoil to reach the ULEB Cup Last 16 and record an unprecedented undefeated domestic season, sweeping through the Bulgarian Cup, regular season and playoffs for a 44–0 record. Čanak averaged 8.1 points and 3.8 rebounds off the bench in 10 ULEB Cup appearances and 12.4 points and 4 rebounds per game in the Bulgarian League.

In 2009, he played in Ukraine with Khimik and Gryfony Symferopil. In the 2009–10 season he had a short stint with Tamiš before he moved to the Hungarian team PVSK Panthers. In the 2010–11 season he played in Cyprus with AEK Larnaca and his last team was Železničar Inđija in 2011–12.

== Coaching career ==
From 2012 to 2016, Čanak worked as an assistant coach of Dejan Milojević in Mega Basket. In the 2016–17 season he served as an assistant coach of Aleksandar Džikić in Partizan, and actually made his debut as a head coach in Džikic's absence, including leading the team to the 2017 Serbian Cup final.

His first job as a head coach was in Spartak Subotica in the 2017–18 season. On 14 December 2017, Čanak was named as the head coach of Partizan. He resigned as the head coach of Partizan on 27 October 2018.

On 1 November 2018, Čanak became the head coach for Lietkabelis Panevėžys of the Lithuanian Basketball League (LKL). With Lietkabelis, Čanak became the most successful coach ever for the team - taking over a largely under-achieving team, Čanak went on to win bronze medals in the Lithuanian Basketball League in 2020, 2021 and 2023, along with a shocking finals appearance in 2022, finishing with silver. Lietkabelis also managed to reach the finals of the King Mindaugas Cup, the national Cup tournament, in 2021 and 2022, taking silver, and won the bronze medals in 2020 and 2023, as well as helping Lietkabelis reach the first ever playoff competitions in club history, by reaching the playoffs of the EuroCup, in 2022 and 2023.

On 19 June 2023, Čanak signed with Türk Telekom of the Basketbol Süper Ligi (BSL). On 24 October, he parted ways with the club.

On 27 October 2023, Čanak returned to Lietkabelis Panevėžys. With Lietkabelis, Čanak again finished with bronze medals in the Lithuanian Basketball League in 2024, and won silver in the King Mindaugas Cup. In 2025, Lietkabelis once again finished with the Lithuanian Basketball League bronze medals and won the bronze medalis in the King Mindaugas Cup.

== Coaching record ==
Legend
G	Games coached	W	Games won	L	Games lost	W–L %	Win-loss %

Note: The EuroLeague is not the only competition in which the team played during the season. He also coached in domestic competition, and regional competition if applicable.

=== EuroCup ===
Team	Year	G	W	L	W–L%	Result
Partizan	2017–18	2	0	2	.000	Eliminated in regular season
Partizan	2018–19	4	1	3	.250	Parted ways
Lietkabelis	2020–21	10	2	8	.200	Eliminated in regular season
Lietkabelis	2021–22	17	9	8	.529	Eliminated in eighthfinals
Lietkabelis	2022–23	19	10	9	.526	Eliminated in eighthfinals
Türk Telekom	2023–24	3	1	2	.333	Parted ways
Lietkabelis	2023–24	14	6	8	.429	Eliminated in regular season
Lietkabelis	2024–25	18	5	13	.278	Eliminated in regular season
Career		87	34	53	.391	

=== Domestic Leagues ===
Team	Year	G	W	L	W–L%	Result
Spartak	2017–18	11	7	4	.636	Parted ways
Partizan (KLS)	2017–18	14	11	3	.786	Lost in semifinals
Partizan	2017–18	11	6	5	.545	5th place
Partizan	2018–19	5	2	3	.400	Parted ways
Lietkabelis	2018–19	41	23	18	.561	Lost in 3rd place series
Lietkabelis	2019–20	24	16	8	.667	3rd place (Note: Season stopped due to the COVID-19 pandemic)
Lietkabelis	2020–21	46	28	18	.609	Won in 3rd place series
Lietkabelis	2021–22	42	30	12	.714	Lost 2022 Lithuanian League Finals
Lietkabelis	2022–23	45	29	16	.644	Won in 3rd place series
Türk Telekom	2023–24	4	2	2	.429	Parted ways
Lietkabelis	2023–24	35	18	17	.514	Won in 3rd place series
Lietkabelis	2024–25	47	27	20	.574	Won in 3rd place series
Career		325	199	126	.612	

== See also ==
- List of Radivoj Korać Cup-winning head coaches
