= 2022 LKL Playoffs =

Basketball playoffs in Lithuania

2022 LKL playoffs
Tournament details
- Country: Lithuania
- Season: 2021–22
- Teams: 8
- Defending champions: BC Žalgiris

Final positions
- Champions: Rytas
- Runners-up: Lietkabelis
- Third place: Žalgiris
- Fourth place: Šiauliai–7bet

The 2022 LKL Playoffs featured the eight best teams of Lietuvos krepšinio lyga (LKL) basketball league in Lithuania, competing for the championship spot. This was the LKL playoffs' 27th edition. Rytas after 12 years achieved their 6th title.

The quarter-finals and semi-finals will be played in a best-of-five format, with the higher seeded team playing the first, third and (if necessary) fifth game at home. The finals will be played in a best-of-seven format, with the higher seed team playing games 1, 3, 5 and 7 (if necessary) at home.

== Schedule ==
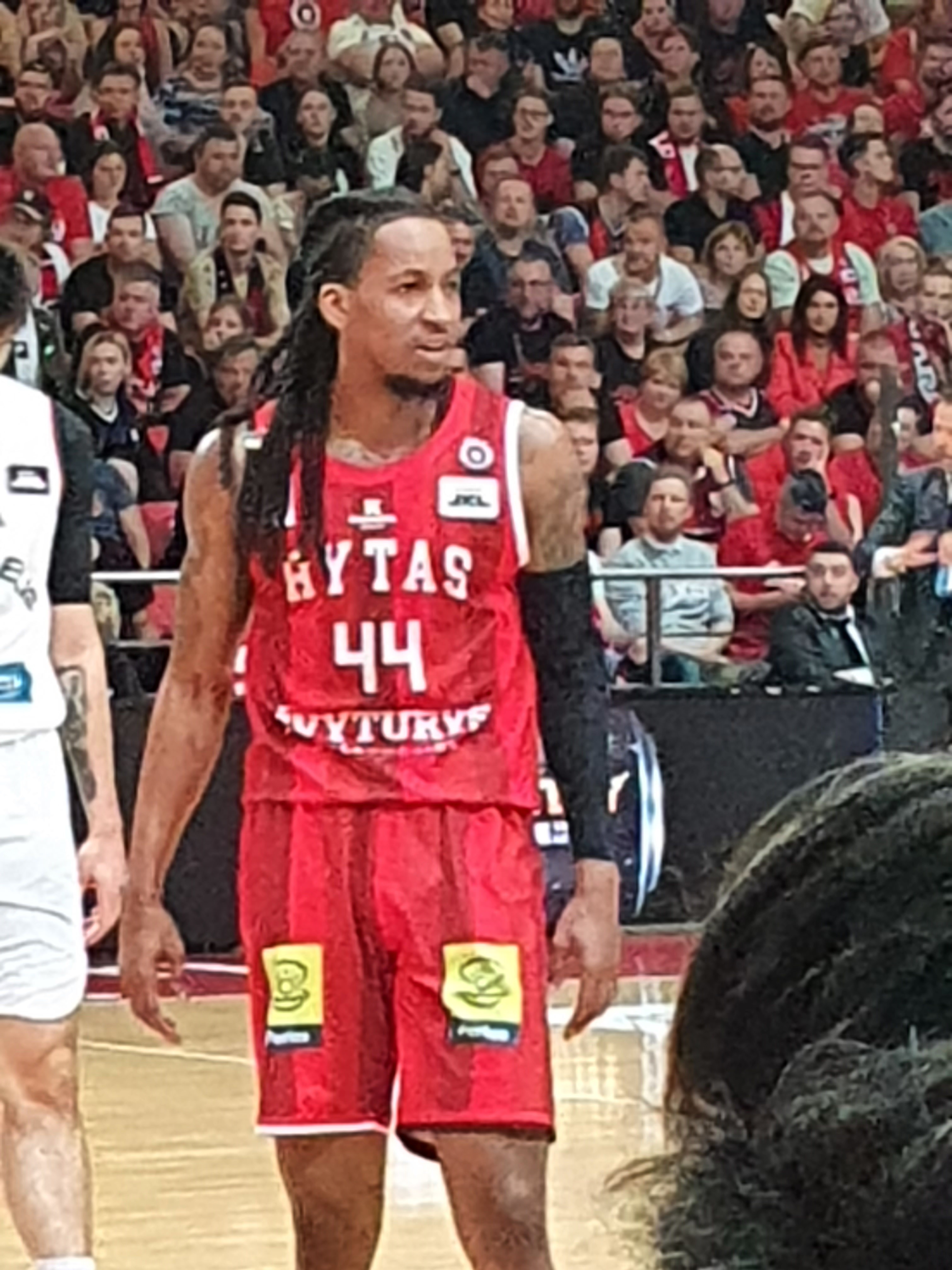
Speedy Smith during Game 5 of the 2022 LKL Finals

Schedule for 2022 LKL playoffs
Phase	Date
Quarter–finals	1–11 May 2022
Semi–finals	13–23 May 2022
Third place	25 May – 11 June 2022
Finals	26 May – 12 June 2022

== Qualified teams ==
Pos	Team	Pld	W	L	PF	PA	PD	Qualification
1	Rytas	30	26	4	2685	2257	+428	Higher seed in playoffs
2	Žalgiris	30	26	4	2578	2247	+331	Higher seed in playoffs
3	Lietkabelis	30	23	7	2522	2233	+289	Higher seed in playoffs
4	Cbet Jonava	30	16	14	2373	2451	−78	Higher seed in playoffs
5	Šiauliai–7bet	30	15	15	2459	2464	−5	Lower seed in playoffs
6	Uniclub Casino – Juventus	30	15	15	2526	2485	+41	Lower seed in playoffs
7	Neptūnas	30	14	16	2332	2390	−58	Lower seed in playoffs
8	Dzūkija	30	11	19	2291	2427	−136	Lower seed in playoffs

Source: LKL.LT

== Notable events ==
- On 28 April 2022, all four Betsafe-LKL quarter-finals pairs are set.
- On 01 May 2022, the first playoff match took place. Rytas won a difficult victory against Dzūkija.
- On 07 May 2022, Lietkabelis won the decisive victory against Juventus and ended the quarter-finals by winning 3-0. Lietkabelis became the first participant in the Betsafe–LKL semi–finals.
- On 08 May 2022, Rytas finished its quarter-finals series 3-1 against Dzūkija and made it to the Betsafe-LKL semi-finals.
- On 11 May 2022, Žalgiris finished its quarter-finals series 3–2 by winning against Neptūnas and qualified for Betsafe–LKL semi-finals.
- On 03 June 2022, Žalgiris won the series for the third place 4-0 against Šiauliai–7bet and won the Betsafe-LKL bronze for the first time in the team's history.
- On 07 June 2022, Rytas after 12 years break won Betsafe–LKL championship and achieved their 6th title overall.

== Bracket ==
Quarter-finals
1	Rytas	3
8	Dzūkija	1
4	Cbet Jonava	1
5	Šiauliai–7bet	3
2	Žalgiris	3
7	Neptūnas	2
3	Lietkabelis	3
6	Uniclub Casino – Juventus	0

Semi-finals
1	Rytas	3
5	Šiauliai–7bet	1
2	Žalgiris	1
3	Lietkabelis	3

Final
1	Rytas	4
3	Lietkabelis	1
Third place
2	Žalgiris	4
5	Šiauliai–7bet	0

== Quarter–finals ==
Team 1	Series	Team 2	Game 1	Game 2	Game 3	Game 4	Game 5
Rytas	3–1	Dzūkija	76–63	73–80	87–59	92–66	—
Cbet Jonava	1–3	Šiauliai–7bet	82–79	66–88	70–72	65–79	—
Žalgiris	3–2	Neptūnas	92–88	68–70	87–71	78–87	89–60
Lietkabelis	3–0	Uniclub Casino – Juventus	102–101 (OT)	95–73	92–87	—	—

=== Rytas vs. Dzūkija ===
1 May 2022 Game 1	Rytas	76–63 (Series: 1–0)	Dzūkija	Vilnius
17:20 (EEST)	Scoring by quarter: 21–15, 12–14, 22–17, 21–17
	Pts: Buva 21; Rebs: Radzevičius 12; Asts: Smith 6 PIR: Buva 26	Report	Pts: Furmanavičius, Aranitović 13; Rebs: Furmanavičius 8 Asts: three players 4 PIR: Furmanavičius 21	Arena: Jeep Arena; Attendance: 1095; Referees: Artūras Šukys, Gintaras Vitkauskas, Andžej Urbanovič

3 May 2022 Game 2	Dzūkija	80–73 (Series: 1–1)	Rytas	Alytus
18:00 (EEST)	Scoring by quarter: 17–20, 17–12, 17–20, 29–21
	Pts: Lukauskis 17; Rebs: Furmanavičius, Newkirk 7 Asts: Aranitović 4 PIR: Lukauskis 19	Report	Pts: Girdžiūnas 24; Rebs: Buva 9 Asts: Smith 9 PIR: Girdžiūnas 25	Arena: Alytus Arena; Attendance: 480; Referees: Saulius Račys, Gintaras Mačiulis, Vilius Mačiulaitis

6 May 2022 Game 3	Rytas	87–59 (Series: 2–1)	Dzūkija	Vilnius
18:50 (EEST)	Scoring by quarter: 13–14, 30–16, 21–14, 23–15
	Pts: Buva 18; Rebs: Radzevičius 9 Asts: Normantas 6 PIR: Buva 22	Report	Pts: Martynas Zigmantavičius 14; Rebs: Aranitović 5 Asts: Lukauskis 2 PIR: Furmanavičius 14	Arena: Jeep Arena; Attendance: 1388; Referees: Jurgis Laurinavičius, Gvidas Gedvilas, Juozas Barkauskas

8 May 2022 Game 4	Dzūkija	66–92 (Series: 1–3)	Rytas	Alytus
16:00 (EEST)	Scoring by quarter: 15–28, 20–22, 14–21, 17–21
	Pts: Furmanavičius 13; Rebs: Łapeta 5 Asts: four players 2 PIR: Furmanavičius 12	Report	Pts: Buva 19; Rebs: Leissner 7 Asts: Smith 5 PIR: Buva 29	Arena: Alytus Arena; Attendance: 620; Referees: Tomas Jasevičius, Artūras Šukys, Gintaras Mačiulis

=== Cbet Jonava vs. Šiauliai–7bet ===
1 May 2022 Game 1	Cbet Jonava	82–79 (Series: 1–0)	Šiauliai–7bet	Jonava
18:30 (EEST)	Scoring by quarter: 15–27, 26–28, 18–10, 23–14
	Pts: Garrett, Šeškus 15; Rebs: Garrett 7 Asts: Šeškus 7 PIR: Šeškus 18	Report	Pts: Varnas 31; Rebs: Staniulis 12; Asts: Sabeckis 11; PIR: Varnas 36	Arena: Jonava Sports Arena; Attendance: 879; Referees: Gytis Vilius, Gvidas Gedvilas, Juozas Barkauskas

3 May 2022 Game 2	Šiauliai–7bet	88–66 (Series: 1–1)	Cbet Jonava	Šiauliai
18:50 (EEST)	Scoring by quarter: 25–19, 18–14, 22–18, 23–15
	Pts: Sanon 19; Rebs: Danusevičius 12; Asts: Sabeckis 8 PIR: Staniulis 20	Report	Pts: Šeškus 12; Rebs: Palacios 8 Asts: Šeškus, Lecomte 4 PIR: Šaulys 17	Arena: Šiauliai Arena; Attendance: 2690; Referees: Jurgis Laurinavičius, Artūras Šukys, Gintaras Vitkauskas

6 May 2022 Game 3	Cbet Jonava	70–72 (Series: 1–2)	Šiauliai–7bet	Jonava
18:00 (EEST)	Scoring by quarter: 11–18, 25–19, 15–14, 19–21
	Pts: Garrett 20; Rebs: Garrett 8 Asts: Šaulys 5 PIR: Garrett 32	Report	Pts: Stankevičius 13; Rebs: Staniulis 8 Asts: Varnas 7 PIR: Varnas, Staniulis 17	Arena: Jonava Sports Arena; Attendance: 1022; Referees: Gytis Vilius, Tomas Jasevičius, Saulius Račys

8 May 2022 Game 4	Šiauliai–7bet	79–65 (Series: 3–1)	Cbet Jonava	Šiauliai
17:20 (EEST)	Scoring by quarter: 26–7, 17–19, 23–18, 13–21
	Pts: Stankevičius 18; Rebs: Staniulis 8 Asts: Sabeckis 7 PIR: Staniulis 20	Report	Pts: Garrett 16; Rebs: Garrett 12; Asts: Kisielius 5 PIR: Garrett 33	Arena: Šiauliai Arena; Attendance: 3811; Referees: Jurgis Laurinavičius, Gvidas Gedvilas, Juozas Barkauskas

=== Žalgiris vs. Neptūnas ===
2 May 2022 Game 1	Žalgiris	92–88 (Series: 1–0)	Neptūnas	Kaunas
18:50 (EEST)	Scoring by quarter: 22–17, 26–23, 28–14, 16–34
	Pts: Lukošiūnas 23; Rebs: Ulanovas 9 Asts: Lekavičius 6 PIR: Ulanovas 27	Report	Pts: Gailius 23; Rebs: Želionis 9 Asts: Janavičius 11; PIR: Gailius 23	Arena: Žalgiris Arena; Attendance: 1383; Referees: Jurgis Laurinavičius, Gintaras Mačiulis, Aurimas Borusas

4 May 2022 Game 2	Neptūnas	70–68 (Series: 1–1)	Žalgiris	Klaipėda
18:00 (EEST)	Scoring by quarter: 15–19, 23–19, 11–10, 21–20
	Pts: Janavičius 21; Rebs: Griciūnas 9 Asts: Janavičius, Gailius 6 PIR: Griciūnas 24	Report	Pts: Lekavičius 17; Rebs: Nebo, Miniotas 4 Asts: Lekavičius 4 PIR: Lekavičius 28	Arena: Švyturys Arena; Attendance: 2117; Referees: Tomas Jasevičius, Gvidas Gedvilas, Juozas Barkauskas

7 May 2022 Game 3	Žalgiris	87–71 (Series: 2–1)	Neptūnas	Kaunas
19:00 (EEST)	Scoring by quarter: 20–11, 31–22, 23–19, 13–19
	Pts: Lekavičius 26; Rebs: Cavanaugh 6 Asts: Webster 5 PIR: Lekavičius 34	Report	Pts: Griciūnas 14; Rebs: Griciūnas 7 Asts: Janavičius 3 PIR: Griciūnas 15	Arena: Garliava Sports Center; Attendance: 1000; Referees: Gytis Vilius, Artūras Šukys, Gintaras Vitkauskas

9 May 2022 Game 4	Neptūnas	87–78 (Series: 2–2)	Žalgiris	Klaipėda
18:50 (EEST)	Scoring by quarter: 21–17, 20–14, 12–15, 34–32
	Pts: Mineikis 23; Rebs: Griciūnas 10; Asts: Jogėla 9 PIR: Mineikis 27	Report	Pts: Lekavičius 19; Rebs: Giffey, Lauvergne 6 Asts: Kalnietis 7 PIR: Lekavičius 19	Arena: Švyturys Arena; Referees: Gytis Vilius, Saulius Račys, Gvidas Gedvilas

11 May 2022 Game 5	Žalgiris	89–60 (Series: 3–2)	Neptūnas	Kaunas
18:50 (EEST)	Scoring by quarter: 23–14, 16–13, 33–17, 17–16
	Pts: Giffey 15; Rebs: Cavanaugh, Giffey 5 Asts: Cavanaugh 4 PIR: Giffey 23	Report	Pts: Gailius 15; Rebs: Griciūnas 6 Asts: five players 5 PIR: Jucikas, Gailius 11	Arena: Žalgiris Arena; Attendance: 3831; Referees: Tomas Jasevičius, Jurgis Laurinavičius, Artūras Šukys

=== Lietkabelis vs. Uniclub Casino – Juventus ===
2 May 2022 Game 1	Lietkabelis	102–101(OT) (Series: 1–0)	Uniclub Casino – Juventus	Panevėžys
18:00 (EEST)	Scoring by quarter: 22–15, 22–29, 29–21, 14–22, Overtime: 15–14
	Pts: Orelik 21; Rebs: Gagić 7 Asts: three players 6 PIR: Orelik 26	Report	Pts: Miller 25; Rebs: three players 6 Asts: Miller 5 PIR: Šulskis 28	Arena: Cido Arena; Attendance: 670; Referees: Tomas Jasevičius, Gvidas Gedvilas, Juozas Barkauskas

4 May 2022 Game 2	Uniclub Casino – Juventus	73–95 (Series: 0–2)	Lietkabelis	Utena
18:50 (EEST)	Scoring by quarter: 20–26, 12–15, 16–25, 25–29
	Pts: Koreniuk 22; Rebs: Šulskis 6 Asts: Miller, Šulskis 4 PIR: Koreniuk 20	Report	Pts: Orelik 18; Rebs: Žemaitis, Orelik 6 Asts: Žemaitis, Orelik 6 PIR: Orelik 28	Arena: Utena Arena; Attendance: 1227; Referees: Saulius Račys, Artūras Šukys, Gintaras Vitkauskas

7 May 2022 Game 3	Lietkabelis	92–87 (Series: 3–0)	Uniclub Casino – Juventus	Panevėžys
17:20 (EEST)	Scoring by quarter: 16–23, 23–26, 25–16, 28–22
	Pts: Gagić 26; Rebs: Orelik 6 Asts: Kalaitzakis 9 PIR: Orelik, Gagić 23	Report	Pts: Šulskis 19; Rebs: Vaitkus 5 Asts: Miller 7 PIR: Šulskis 25	Arena: Cido Arena; Attendance: 953; Referees: Jurgis Laurinavičius, Juozas Barkauskas, Gintaras Mačiulis

== Semi–finals ==
Team 1	Series	Team 2	Game 1	Game 2	Game 3	Game 4	Game 5
Rytas	3–1	Šiauliai–7bet	97–75	72–84	94–79	87—77	—
Žalgiris	1–3	Lietkabelis	71–70	55–79	69–73	75—86	—

=== Rytas vs. Šiauliai–7bet ===
13 May 2022 Game 1	Rytas	97–75 (Series: 1–0)	Šiauliai–7bet	Vilnius
18:50 (EEST)	Scoring by quarter: 16–14, 25–20, 33–18, 23–23
	Pts: Normantas 16; Rebs: Radzevičius 9 Asts: Smith 6 PIR: Uleckas 16	Report	Pts: Sanon 20; Rebs: Sabeckis 7 Asts: three players 4 PIR: Sanon 24	Arena: Jeep Arena; Attendance: 2056; Referees: Gytis Vilius, Saulius Račys, Artūras Šukys

15 May 2022 Game 2	Šiauliai–7bet	84–72 (Series: 1–1)	Rytas	Šiauliai
17:20 (EEST)	Scoring by quarter: 21–21, 31–14, 16–16, 16–21
	Pts: Sabeckis 17; Rebs: three players 6 Asts: Elmore 5 PIR: Sabeckis 19	Report	Pts: Butkevičius 23; Rebs: Radzevičius 7 Asts: Smith 8 PIR: Butkevičius 30	Arena: Šiauliai Arena; Attendance: 4172; Referees: Gytis Vilius, Jurgis Laurinavičius, Gvidas Gedvilas

18 May 2022 Game 3	Rytas	94–79 (Series: 2–1)	Šiauliai–7bet	Vilnius
18:50 (EEST)	Scoring by quarter: 28–27, 19–11, 26–18, 21–23
	Pts: Radzevičius, Smith 17; Rebs: Butkevičius 6 Asts: Smith 8 PIR: Smith 28	Report	Pts: Armwood 23; Rebs: Sabeckis 8 Asts: Elmore 5 PIR: Armwood 27	Arena: Jeep Arena; Attendance: 2108; Referees: Tomas Jasevičius, Gvidas Gedvilas, Juozas Barkauskas

20 May 2022 Game 4	Šiauliai–7bet	77–87 (Series: 1–3)	Rytas	Šiauliai
18:50 (EEST)	Scoring by quarter: 24—17, 19—22, 13—20, 21—28
	Pts: Sanon 16; Rebs: Staniulis 9 Asts: Sabeckis 4 PIR: Armwood 18	Report	Pts: Smith 21; Rebs: Butkevičius 7 Asts: Butkevičius 4 PIR: Butkevičius 21	Arena: Šiauliai Arena; Attendance: 4867; Referees: Jurgis Laurinavičius, Gvidas Gedvilas, Gintaras Vitkauskas

=== Žalgiris vs. Lietkabelis ===
14 May 2022 Game 1	Žalgiris	71–70 (Series: 1–0)	Lietkabelis	Kaunas
17:20 (EEST)	Scoring by quarter: 16–19, 18–17, 21–20, 16–14
	Pts: Webster 14; Rebs: Nebo 7 Asts: Kalnietis, Jankūnas 4 PIR: Webster 14	Report	Pts: Orelik, Gagić 19; Rebs: Orelik 7 Asts: Orelik 4 PIR: Orelik 26	Arena: Žalgiris Arena; Attendance: 3678; Referees: Tomas Jasevičius, Saulius Račys, Jurgis Laurinavičius

16 May 2022 Game 2	Lietkabelis	79–55 (Series: 1–1)	Žalgiris	Panevėžys
18:50 (EEST)	Scoring by quarter: 20–16, 28–11, 14–16, 17–12
	Pts: Lipkevičius 21; Rebs: Kalaitzakis 10; Asts: Orelik 7 PIR: Lipkevičius 24	Report	Pts: Nebo 16; Rebs: Giffey 7 Asts: Kalnietis 6 PIR: Nebo 16	Arena: Cido Arena; Attendance: 4256; Referees: Gytis Vilius, Tomas Jasevičius, Artūras Šukys

19 May 2022 Game 3	Žalgiris	69–73 (Series: 1–2)	Lietkabelis	Kaunas
18:50 (EEST)	Scoring by quarter: 21–18, 22–14, 10–16, 16–25
	Pts: Strēlnieks 15; Rebs: three players 5 Asts: Lekavičius 7 PIR: Lekavičius 14	Report	Pts: Kalaitzakis 18; Rebs: Gagić 8 Asts: D. Giedraitis 5 PIR: D. Giedraitis 21	Arena: Žalgiris Arena; Attendance: 4221; Referees: Jurgis Laurinavičius, Gintaras Vitkauskas, Gintaras Mačiulis

21 May 2022 Game 4	Lietkabelis	86–75 (Series: 3–1)	Žalgiris	Panevėžys
17:20 (EEST)	Scoring by quarter: 15–17, 28–15, 24–25, 19–18
	Pts: Orelik 19; Rebs: Gagić 7 Asts: Kalaitzakis 4 PIR: Orelik 20	Report	Pts: Lekavičius, Cavanaugh 14; Rebs: Ulanovas 6 Asts: Kalnietis 6 PIR: Lekavičius 18	Arena: Cido Arena; Attendance: 6480; Referees: Tomas Jasevičius, Saulius Račys, Artūras Šukys

== Third place ==
Team 1	Series	Team 2	Game 1	Game 2	Game 3	Game 4	Game 5	Game 6	Game 7
Žalgiris	4–0	Šiauliai–7bet	92–75	90–85 (OT)	85–70	89–76	—	—	—

=== Žalgiris vs. Šiauliai–7bet ===
25 May 2022 Game 1	Žalgiris	92–75 (Series: 1–0)	Šiauliai–7bet	Kaunas
18:50 (EEST)	Scoring by quarter: 28–18, 29–21, 14–19, 21–17
	Pts: three players 14; Rebs: Nebo, Cavanaugh 7 Asts: Lekavičius 7 PIR: Cavanaugh 20	Report	Pts: Staniulis 17; Rebs: Staniulis 9 Asts: Sabeckis 5 PIR: Staniulis 19	Arena: Žalgiris Arena; Attendance: 1316; Referees: Tomas Jasevičius, Jurgis Laurinavičius, Saulius Račys

28 May 2022 Game 2	Šiauliai–7bet	85–90(OT) (Series: 0–2)	Žalgiris	Šiauliai
17:20 (EEST)	Scoring by quarter: 17–26, 18–17, 27–17, 18–20, Overtime: 5–10
	Pts: Varnas, Bezbradica 16; Rebs: Staniulis 9 Asts: Sabeckis 8 PIR: Bezbradica 21	Report	Pts: Ulanovas 16; Rebs: Ulanovas 7 Asts: Kalnietis, Lekavičius 5 PIR: Ulanovas 20	Arena: Šiauliai Arena; Attendance: 3945; Referees: Artūras Šukys, Gvidas Gedvilas, Gintaras Vitkauskas

31 May 2022 Game 3	Žalgiris	85–70 (Series: 3–0)	Šiauliai–7bet	Kaunas
18:50 (EEST)	Scoring by quarter: 24–15, 27–20, 14–18, 20–17
	Pts: Blaževič 15; Rebs: Nebo 6 Asts: Strēlnieks; PIR: Nebo 16	Report	Pts: Sabeckis 13; Rebs: Sabeckis, Staniulis 5 Asts: Sabeckis 7 PIR: Sabeckis 16	Arena: Žalgiris Arena; Attendance: 2043; Referees: Gytis Vilius, Jurgis Laurinavičius, Gintaras Mačiulis

3 June 2022 Game 4	Šiauliai–7bet	76–89 (Series: 0–4)	Žalgiris	Šiauliai
18:50 (EEST)	Scoring by quarter: 26–23, 14–21, 15–23, 21–22
	Pts: Sabeckis 23; Rebs: Sanon 6 Asts: Varnas 6 PIR: Sabeckis 19	Report	Pts: Blaževič 17; Rebs: Blaževič 12; Asts: Lekavičius 6 PIR: Blaževič 29	Arena: Šiauliai Arena; Referees: Gytis Vilius, Jurgis Laurinavičius, Gvidas Gedvilas

== Finals ==
Team 1	Series	Team 2	Game 1	Game 2	Game 3	Game 4	Game 5	Game 6	Game 7
Rytas	4–1	Lietkabelis	68–77	88–66	85–63	78–77	79–76	—	—

=== Rytas vs. Lietkabelis ===
26 May 2022 Game 1	Rytas	68–77 (Series: 0–1)	Lietkabelis	Vilnius
18:50 (EEST)	Scoring by quarter: 26–17, 10–19, 17–27, 15–14
	Pts: Normantas 11; Rebs: Radzevičius 11; Asts: Smith 4 PIR: Radzevičius 17	Report	Pts: Kalaitzakis 16; Rebs: Maldūnas 7 Asts: Orelik, Kalaitzakis 3 PIR: Gagić 25	Arena: Avia Solutions Group Arena; Attendance: 6016; Referees: Gytis Vilius, Saulius Račys, Artūras Šukys

29 May 2022 Game 2	Lietkabelis	66–88 (Series: 1–1)	Rytas	Panevėžys
17:20 (EEST)	Scoring by quarter: 23–25, 18–23, 8–17, 17–23
	Pts: Maldūnas 14; Rebs: Lipkevičius 10; Asts: Orelik, Žemaitis 3 PIR: Lipkevičius 22	Report	Pts: Uleckas 24; Rebs: Butkevičius 8 Asts: Smith 6 PIR: Uleckas 30	Arena: Cido Arena; Attendance: 6130; Referees: Gytis Vilius, Tomas Jasevičius, Jurgis Laurinavičius

1 June 2022 Game 3	Rytas	85–63 (Series: 2–1)	Lietkabelis	Vilnius
18:50 (EEST)	Scoring by quarter: 22–9, 29–18, 16–18, 18–18
	Pts: Radzevičius 14; Rebs: Leissner 8 Asts: Smith 7 PIR: Radzevičius 20	Report	Pts: Gagić 13; Rebs: Maldūnas 10; Asts: Žemaitis 4 PIR: Maldūnas 14	Arena: Jeep Arena; Attendance: 2614; Referees: Tomas Jasevičius, Saulius Račys, Artūras Šukys

4 June 2022 Game 4	Lietkabelis	77–78 (Series: 1–3)	Rytas	Panevėžys
17:20 (EEST)	Scoring by quarter: 22–19, 16–28, 20–7, 19–24
	Pts: Kalaitzakis, Orelik 17; Rebs: Kalaitzakis 6 Asts: Radičević 6 PIR: Radičević, Orelik 16	Report	Pts: Smith 18; Rebs: Radzevičius 6 Asts: Smith 8 PIR: Smith 23	Arena: Cido Arena; Attendance: 6180; Referees: Gytis Vilius, Jurgis Laurinavičius, Artūras Šukys

7 June 2022 Game 5	Rytas	79–76 (Series: 4–1)	Lietkabelis	Vilnius
18:50 (EEST)	Scoring by quarter: 17–23, 18–21, 21–18, 23–14
	Pts: Normantas 15; Rebs: Williams 6 Asts: Smith 8 PIR: Normantas 20	Report	Pts: Orelik 16; Rebs: Orelik, Lipkevičius 5 Asts: Radičević 7 PIR: Radičević 20	Arena: Jeep Arena; Attendance: 2643; Referees: Gytis Vilius, Jurgis Laurinavičius, Saulius Račys

== See also ==
- 2020–21 LKL season
- 2021 LKL Playoffs
