= 2023–24 LKL season =

31st season of the top-tier level professional basketball league of Lithuania

Betsafe-LKL
- Season: 2023–24
- Duration: 16 September 2023 – 9 May 2024 (Regular season); 12 May – 12 June 2024 (Playoffs)
- Games played: 191
- Teams: 12

Regular season
- Season MVP: (Lithuania) Ąžuolas Tubelis

Finals
- Champions: Rytas (7th title)
- Runners-up: Žalgiris
- Third place: 7Bet–Lietkabelis
- Fourth place: Wolves Twinsbet
- Finals MVP: (United States) Marcus Foster

Statistical leaders
Points	(United States) Nick Ward	20.23
Rebounds	(Lithuania) Giedrius Staniulis	8.41
Assists	(Israel) Amit Ebo	7.63
Index Rating	(United States) Nick Ward	21.23

Records
- Biggest home win: Rytas 113–64 Nevėžis–Optibet (10 February 2024)
- Biggest away win: Pieno žvaigždės 72–115 Šiauliai (8 January 2024)
- Highest scoring: Neptūnas 114–112 Žalgiris (17 April 2024)
- Winning streak: 14 games Žalgiris
- Losing streak: 14 games Pieno žvaigždės
- Highest attendance: 13,791; Žalgiris 92–78 Rytas (14 April 2024)
- Lowest attendance: 139; Pieno žvaigždės 77–116 Cbet (1 May 2024)
- Average attendance: 2,176

Seasons
- ← 2022–23 2024–25 →

The 2023–24 Lietuvos krepšinio lyga season, also called Betsafe–LKL for sponsorship reasons, was the 31st season of the top-tier level professional basketball league of Lithuania, the Lietuvos krepšinio lyga (LKL). Rytas won their seventh championship after defeating defending champions Žalgiris in the finals 3–1.

== Teams ==
12 teams participated in the 2023–24 season. On 22 May 2023, league's license was granted to M Basket. On 25 January 2024, Gargždai declared bankruptcy and during the meeting on 29 January, it was officially confirmed that the team would not play the remaining games of the season.

=== Location and arenas ===
Wolves Twinsbet played in the Avia Solutions Group Arena after spending their inaugural season playing in Alytus, during the reconstruction of the venue. On August 26, Rytas agreed to also return to the venue for a limited number of matches.

Two newest members of the league played home games out of town, due to a lack of suitable venues. Gargždai shared the Švyturys Arena with Neptūnas after failing to agree terms to extend the lease of the Palanga Arena. M Basket-Delamode played in Telšiai, after the final refurbishments of the Telšiai Sports Arena managed to satisfy minimum LKL requirements.

Location of teams in 2023–24 LKL

Team	Location	Arena	Capacity
7Bet–Lietkabelis	Panevėžys	Kalnapilio Arena	5,950
Cbet	Jonava	Jonava Arena	2,200
Gargždai	Klaipėda	Švyturys Arena	6,200
M Basket-Delamode	Telšiai	Telšiai sports arena	1,000
Neptūnas	Klaipėda	Švyturys Arena	6,200
Nevėžis–Optibet	Kėdainiai	Kėdainiai Arena	2,200
Pieno žvaigždės	Pasvalys	Pieno žvaigždės Arena	1,500
Rytas	Vilnius	Avia Solutions Group Arena	10,000
Rytas	Vilnius	Jeep Arena	2,500
Šiauliai	Šiauliai	Šiauliai Arena	5,700
Uniclub Casino – Juventus	Utena	Utena Arena	2,000
Wolves Twinsbet	Vilnius	Avia Solutions Group Arena	10,000
Žalgiris	Kaunas	Žalgiris Arena	15,415

== Regular season ==
=== League table ===
Pos	Team	Pld	W	L	PF	PA	PD	Qualification or relegation
1	Žalgiris	30	26	4	2647	2228	+419	Advance to playoffs
2	Rytas	30	24	6	2791	2410	+381	Advance to playoffs
3	Wolves Twinsbet	30	22	8	2613	2397	+216	Advance to playoffs
4	Uniclub Casino – Juventus	30	18	12	2624	2464	+160	Advance to playoffs
5	7Bet–Lietkabelis	30	16	14	2538	2533	+5	Advance to playoffs
6	Neptūnas	30	14	16	2541	2605	−64	Advance to playoffs
7	Cbet	30	11 (Note: Cbet are ahead of M Basket-Delamode on head-to-head record: Cbet 2–1 M Basket-Delamode.)	19	2454	2590	−136	Advance to playoffs
8	M Basket-Delamode	30	11	19	2335	2530	−195	Advance to playoffs
9	Nevėžis–Optibet	30	10	20	2525	2746	−221	
10	Šiauliai	30	8	22	2456	2622	−166	
11	Pieno žvaigždės	30	5	25	2469	2868	−399	
12	Gargždai	0	0	0	0	0	0	Excluded

Source: LKL.lt

=== Results ===
Home \ Away	LIE	JSK	GAR	MAZ	NEP	NEV	PZV	RYT	SIA	JUV	WOL	ZAL
7Bet–Lietkabelis	—	84–79	84–66	82–81	76–78	100–79	95–92	77–89	92–85	72–73	108–105	68–80
7Bet–Lietkabelis	—	90–80	—	88–82	—	92–93	90–63	—	—	78–91	—	77–83
Cbet	74–92	—	105–73	87–96	88–77	94–77	84–89	89–101	85–84	84–73	71–83	67–75
Cbet	—	—	—	—	78–81	—	—	85–98	81–80	—	81–68	—
Gargždai	—	86–80	—	82–93	73–92	97–84	—	82–98	89–94	74–97	—	55–107
Gargždai	—	—	—	—	—	—	—	—	—	—	—	—
M Basket–Delamode	64–82	79–82	77–66	—	70–68	88–81	100–74	60–77	73–78	88–86	73–84	69–73
M Basket–Delamode	—	62–79	—	—	—	81–93	79–73	63–89	—	73–71	—	—
Neptūnas	91–81	69–64	100–81	84–87	—	97–74	112–87	70–77	85–76	78–91	66–98	75–95
Neptūnas	88–84	—	—	91–89	—	79–92	77–88	—	—	—	85–86	114–112
Nevėžis–Optibet	106–94	92–86	92–80	72–83	96–92	—	90–91	85–97	89–84	64–90	78–99	70–76
Nevėžis–Optibet	—	116–83	—	—	—	—	—	79–88	86–94	88–93	—	—
Pieno žvaigždės	78–84	92–93	103–76	107–88	83–86	91–101	—	77–101	72–115	75–85	88–91	71–98
Pieno žvaigždės	—	77–116	—	—	—	74–76	—	89–124	—	83–89	—	—
Rytas	94–73	110–88	110–79	90–54	93–75	113–64	106–90	—	91–78	93–88	74–84	67–81
Rytas	113–100	—	—	—	83–84	—	—	—	83–74	—	99–83	—
Šiauliai	74–88	89–86	79–97	81–90	90–82	85–77	91–95	75–99	—	66–103	66–68	73–87
Šiauliai	79–87	—	—	91–94	104–98	—	98–89	—	—	—	65–91	69–92
Uniclub Casino – Juventus	88–91	96–63	—	81–74	112–102	106–74	119–78	96–103	88–68	—	96–68	69–79
Uniclub Casino – Juventus	—	88–85	—	—	83–96	—	—	88–78	96–93	—	—	—
Wolves Twinsbet	73–78	85–96	104–68	84–74	92–73	89–74	94–79	72–89	86–77	77–71	—	75–64
Wolves Twinsbet	109–72	—	—	104–78	—	102–83	111–79	—	—	100–88	—	97–93
Žalgiris	69–63	86–69	—	103–75	76–88	102–98	78–68	97–94	89–74	101–63	79–55	—
Žalgiris	83–77	101–57	—	95–68	112–114	102–78	97–77	92–78	92–69	92–62	93–97	—

Source: LKL.lt
Legend: Blue = home team win; Red = away team win.
Matches with lighter background shading were decided after overtime.

== Playoffs ==
Quarterfinals will be played in a best–of–three format, while the semifinals, third place game and final in a best-of-five format.

=== Bracket ===
Quarterfinals
Žalgiris	97	76	–
M Basket-Delamode	61	58	–
Uniclub Casino – Juventus	77	89	99
7Bet–Lietkabelis	84	88	100
Rytas	110	96	–
Cbet	77	90	–
Wolves Twinsbet	91	76	91
Neptūnas	84	95	80

Semifinals
Žalgiris	93	90	88	–	–
7Bet–Lietkabelis	72	89	79	–	–
Rytas	85	113	86	86	92
Wolves Twinsbet	96	75	78	97	86

Finals
Žalgiris	88	94	91	87	–
Rytas	89	104	81	88	–
Third place
7Bet–Lietkabelis	86	73	91	98	–
Wolves Twinsbet	84	81	84	87	–

2023–24 LKL champions
Rytas
(7th title)

== Final standings ==
Pos	Team	Pld	W	L	Qualification or relegation
1	Rytas (C)	41	32	9	Qualification to Champions League regular season
2	Žalgiris	39	32	7	Already qualified to EuroLeague
3	7Bet–Lietkabelis	40	21	19	Qualification to EuroCup
4	Wolves Twinsbet	42	27	15	Qualification to EuroCup
5	Uniclub Casino – Juventus	33	19	14	Qualification to Champions League qualifying rounds
6	Neptūnas	33	15	18	
7	Cbet	32	11	21	
8	M Basket-Delamode	32	11	21	
9	Nevėžis–Optibet	30	10	20	
10	Šiauliai	30	8	22	
11	Pieno žvaigždės	30	5	25	
12	Gargždai	0	0	0	Excluded

Source: LKL.lt
(C) Champions

== Statistics ==
=== Average attendances ===
Pos	Team	Total	High	Low	Average	Change
1	Žalgiris	104,303	13,791	909	4,966	+8.4%
2	Rytas	75,282	9,149	1,597	3,764	+111.7%
3	Wolves Twinsbet	70,863	8,522	386	3,221	+63.4%
4	7Bet–Lietkabelis	45,242	5,251	959	2,262	+2.3%
5	Neptūnas	35,491	4,736	1,029	2,087	+31.7%
6	Šiauliai	29,419	5,507	898	1,838	+5.0%
7	Uniclub Casino – Juventus	22,797	2,496	663	1,424	+12.0%
8	Nevėžis–Optibet	15,295	2,279	639	1,092	+22.8%
9	Cbet	15,125	2,200	659	1,008	−21.1%
10	M Basket-Delamode	11,500	1,098	451	766	n/a^{1}
11	Gargždai	6,033	2,056	323	754	+12.7%
12	Pieno žvaigždės	5,795	1,200	139	413	+20.1%
	League total	428,719	13,791	139	2,176	+30.5%

Source: LKL.lt
Notes:
1: Team played last season in NKL.

=== Individual statistics ===
==== Rating ====
Rank	Name	Team	Games	Rating	PIR
1.	(United States) Nick Ward	Gargždai	13	276	21.23
2.	(Lithuania) Ąžuolas Tubelis	Neptūnas	26	529	20.35
3.	(United States) Kadeem Jack	Pieno žvaigždės	20	379	18.95

Source: LKL.lt

==== Points ====
Rank	Name	Team	Games	Points	PPG
1.	(United States) Nick Ward	Gargždai	13	263	20.23
2.	(United States) Brandon Tabb	Pieno žvaigždės	16	309	19.31
3.	(Lithuania) Ąžuolas Tubelis	Neptūnas	26	448	17.23

Source: LKL.lt

==== Rebounds ====
Rank	Name	Team	Games	Rebounds	RPG
1.	(Lithuania) Giedrius Staniulis	M Basket-Delamode	34	286	8.41
2.	(Nigeria) Francis Okoro	Nevėžis–Optibet	22	175	7.95
3.	(Lithuania) Ąžuolas Tubelis	Neptūnas	26	187	7.19

Source: LKL.lt

==== Assists ====
Rank	Name	Team	Games	Assists	APG
1.	(Israel) Amit Ebo	Nevėžis–Optibet	16	122	7.63
2.	(Lithuania) Žygimantas Janavičius	Neptūnas	34	214	6.29
3.	(United States) L.J. Thorpe	Šiauliai	31	195	6.29

Source: LKL.lt

==== Other statistics ====
Category	Player	Team	Games	Average
Steals	(United States) Brandon Tabb	Pieno žvaigždės	16	2.75
Blocks	(Slovakia) Tomaš Pavelka	Šiauliai	32	1.78
Turnovers	(Israel) Amit Ebo	Nevėžis–Optibet	16	3.63
Fouls drawn	(United States) Nick Ward	Gargždai	13	6.54
Minutes	(Serbia) Strahinja Mićović	Cbet	29	32:20
FT %	(Lithuania) Evaldas Šaulys	Uniclub Casino – Juventus	33	92.11%
2-Point %	(Lithuania) Šarūnas Beniušis	Uniclub Casino – Juventus	34	76.19%
3-Point %	(United States) Deante Johnson	Pieno žvaigždės	29	62.50%

Source: LKL.lt

=== Individual game highs ===
Category	Player	Team	Opponent	Statistic
Rating	(Lithuania) Ąžuolas Tubelis	Neptūnas	Cbet (Apr 8, 2024)	49
Points	(United States) Zane Waterman	Nevėžis–Optibet	Uniclub Casino – Juventus (Mar 18, 2024)	35
Rebounds	(Lithuania) Regimantas Miniotas	Wolves Twinsbet	Šiauliai (Dec 3, 2023)	19
Assists	(Israel) Amit Ebo	Nevėžis–Optibet	Cbet (Apr 18, 2023)	21
Steals	(Lithuania) Arnas Butkevičius	Žalgiris	M Basket-Delamode (Oct 9, 2023)	8
Blocks	(Lithuania) Justas Furmanavičius	Gargždai	Šiauliai (Oct 22, 2023)	7

Source: LKL.lt

=== Team statistics ===
Category	Team	Average
Rating	Rytas	108.80
Points	Rytas	93.20
Rebounds	Rytas	40.05
Assists	Neptūnas	21.76
Steals	Uniclub Casino – Juventus	8.73
Blocks	Šiauliai	3.80
Turnovers	Pieno žvaigždės	14.80
FT %	Žalgiris	77.83%
2-Point %	Rytas	60.08%
3-Point %	Wolves Twinsbet	37.62%

Source: LKL.lt

== Awards ==
All official awards of the 2023–24 LKL season.

=== Regular Season MVP ===
Pos.	Player	Team	Source
PF	(Lithuania) Ąžuolas Tubelis	Neptūnas	

=== LKL Finals MVP ===
Pos.	Player	Team	Source
SG	(United States) Marcus Foster	Rytas	

=== Breakthrough of the Year ===
Player	Team	Source
(Lithuania) Ignas Sargiūnas	Neptūnas	

=== Coach of the Year ===
Coach	Team	Source
(Serbia) Oliver Kostić	Uniclub Casino – Juventus	

=== All-LKL Team ===
Pos.	Player	Team	Source
PG	(United States) Scoochie Smith	Uniclub Casino – Juventus	
SG	(United States) Rasheed Sulaimon	Wolves Twinsbet	
SF	(Lithuania) Deividas Sirvydis	7Bet–Lietkabelis	
PF	(Lithuania) Ąžuolas Tubelis	Neptūnas	
C	(Lithuania) Laurynas Birutis	Žalgiris	

=== Player of the month ===
Month	Player	Team	PIR	Source
2023
September	(Lithuania) Gytis Masiulis	Rytas	24.5	
October	(United States) Nick Ward	Gargždai	27.7	
November	(United States) Brandon Tabb	Pieno žvaigždės	26.7	
December	(United States) Zane Waterman	Nevėžis–Optibet	24.5	
2024
January–February	(United States) Marcus Foster	Rytas	21.8	
March	(United States) Zane Waterman	Nevėžis–Optibet	27.4	
April	(Israel) Amit Ebo	Nevėžis–Optibet	27.3	

== LKL clubs in international competitions ==
Euroleague Basketball competitions
Team	Competition	Progress	Result	W–L
Žalgiris	EuroLeague	Regular season	14th place out of 18 teams	14–20
7Bet–Lietkabelis	EuroCup	Regular season Group B	9th place out of 10 teams	7–11
Wolves Twinsbet	EuroCup	Regular season Group A	7th place out of 10 teams	8–10

FIBA competitions
Team	Competition	Progress	Result	W–L
Rytas	Champions League	Regular season Group B	2nd place out of 4 teams	4–2
Rytas	Champions League	Play-ins	Loss vs. (Greece) Peristeri bwin	0–2
Cbet	Champions League	Qualifying tournament 3	Loss vs. (France) SIG Strasbourg	0–1
Cbet	FIBA Europe Cup	Regular season Group C	1st place out of 4 teams	4–2
Cbet	FIBA Europe Cup	Second round Group L	4th place out of 4 teams	0–6
Nevėžis–Optibet	FIBA Europe Cup	Qualifying tournament B	3rd place out of 3 teams	0–2

== Lithuanian clubs in regional competitions ==
Team	Competition	Progress	Result	W–L
Uniclub Casino – Juventus	European North Basketball League	Regular season Group A	1st place out of 8 teams	6–1
Uniclub Casino – Juventus	European North Basketball League	Quarterfinals	Loss vs. (Belgium) Royal Liege Basket (180–182)	1–1
Šiauliai	European North Basketball League	Regular season Group B	1st place out of 8 teams	6–1
Šiauliai	European North Basketball League	Quarterfinals	Win vs. (United Kingdom) Bristol Flyers (174–155)	2–0
Šiauliai	European North Basketball League	Semifinals	Loss vs. (Denmark) Bakken Bears	0–1
Šiauliai	European North Basketball League	Third place	Loss vs. (Belgium) Royal Liege Basket	0–1
