= Lukas Uleckas =

Lithuanian basketball player

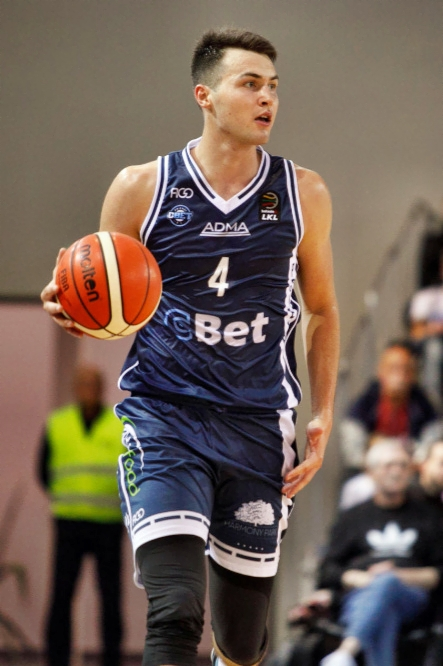
- Uleckas with CBet Prienai in 2019

No. 10 – Básquet Coruña
- Position: Small forward / shooting guard
- League: Liga ACB

Personal information
- Born: 6 August 1999 (age 27) Marijampolė, Lithuania
- Listed height: 2.00 m (6 ft 7 in)
- Listed weight: 94 kg (207 lb)

Career information
- NBA draft: 2021: undrafted
- Playing career: 2015–present

Career history
- 2016–2020: Žalgiris Kaunas
- 2016–2019: →Žalgiris-2 Kaunas
- 2019–2020: →CBet Prienai
- 2020–2024: Rytas Vilnius
- 2024–2025: Šiauliai
- 2025–2026: Juventus Utena
- 2026–present: Básquet Coruña

Career highlights
- 3× Lithuanian League champion (2019, 2022, 2024)
Medals
Men's basketball
Representing Lithuania
FIBA Europe Under-18 Championship
| Silver medal – second place | 2016 Turkey | U-18 National Team |
| Bronze medal – third place | 2017 Slovakia | U-18 National Team |
FIBA Europe Under-16 Championship
| Silver medal – second place | 2015 Lithuania | U-16 National Team |

Lukas Uleckas (born 6 August 1999) is a Lithuanian professional basketball player for Básquet Coruña of the Liga ACB. Uleckas has competed with the Lithuanian junior national teams on multiple occasions.

== Early career ==
Uleckas began his career in 2015, playing for Sabonis Basketball Center of the RKL. In July 2016, he signed a long-term deal with Žalgiris Kaunas. He then joined Žalgiris-2 Kaunas of the NKL, where he played for three seasons.

== Professional career ==
Uleckas made his professional debut with Žalgiris' senior team on 14 October 2018, in an LKL regular season home game against BC Neptūnas. For the 2019–20 season, he was loaned to CBet Prienai.

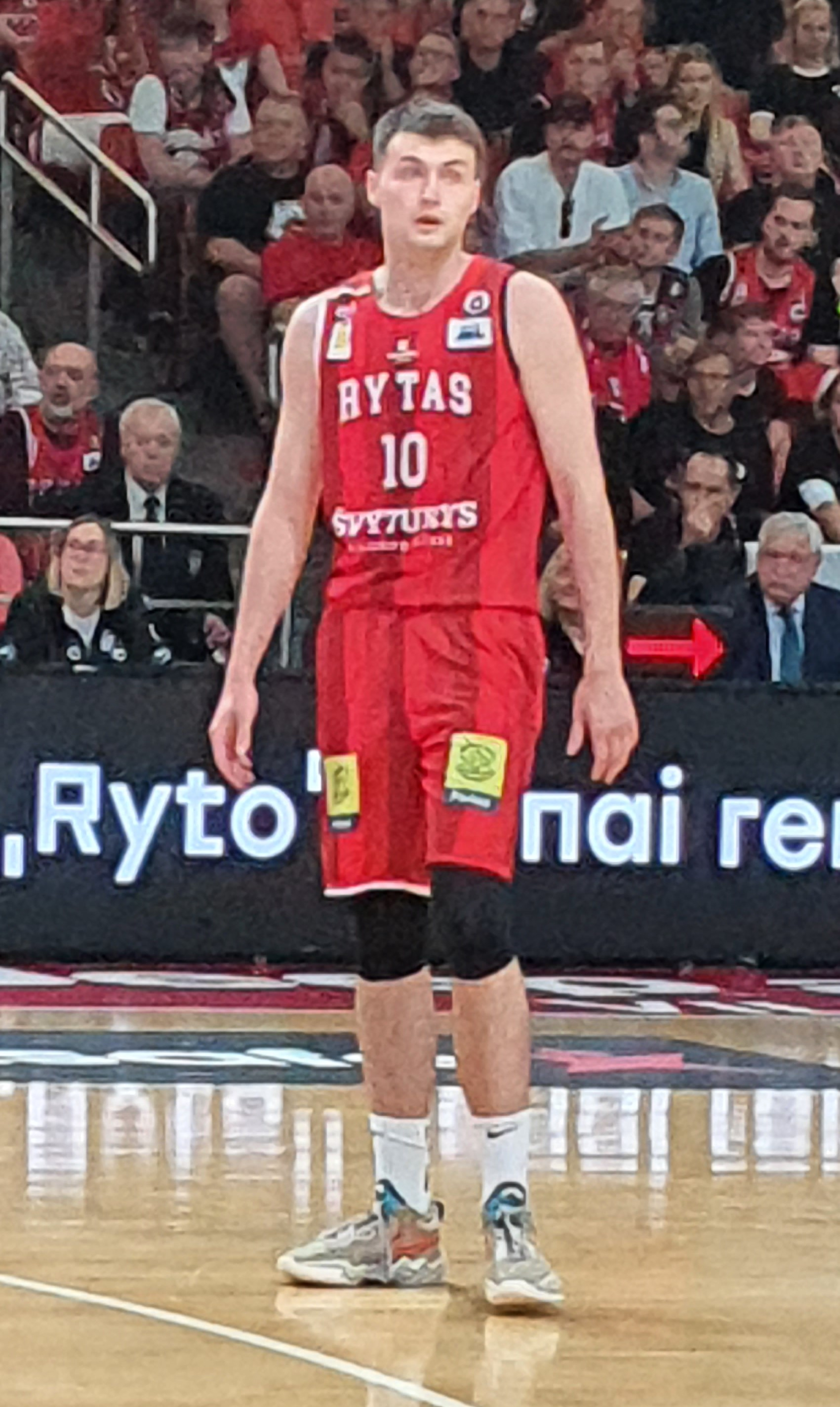
Uleckas with Rytas Vilnius during the 2022 LKL Finals

On 5 July 2020, Uleckas signed a three-year contract with Rytas Vilnius. On 19 June 2024, Uleckas parted ways with the club after four seasons, having won the LKL championship twice in 2022 and 2024.

On 9 July 2024, Uleckas signed with Šiauliai of the Lithuanian Basketball League (LKL).

On 9 August 2025, Uleckas signed with Juventus Utena of the Lithuanian Basketball League (LKL). He appeared in 40 games throughout the 2025–26 LKL season, averaging 12.3 points, 6.3 rebounds, 3.1 assists and 1.1 steals to help his team reach the league finals.

On 18 July 2026, he signed with Básquet Coruña of the Liga ACB.
