= Đorđe Gagić =

Serbian basketball player (born 1990)

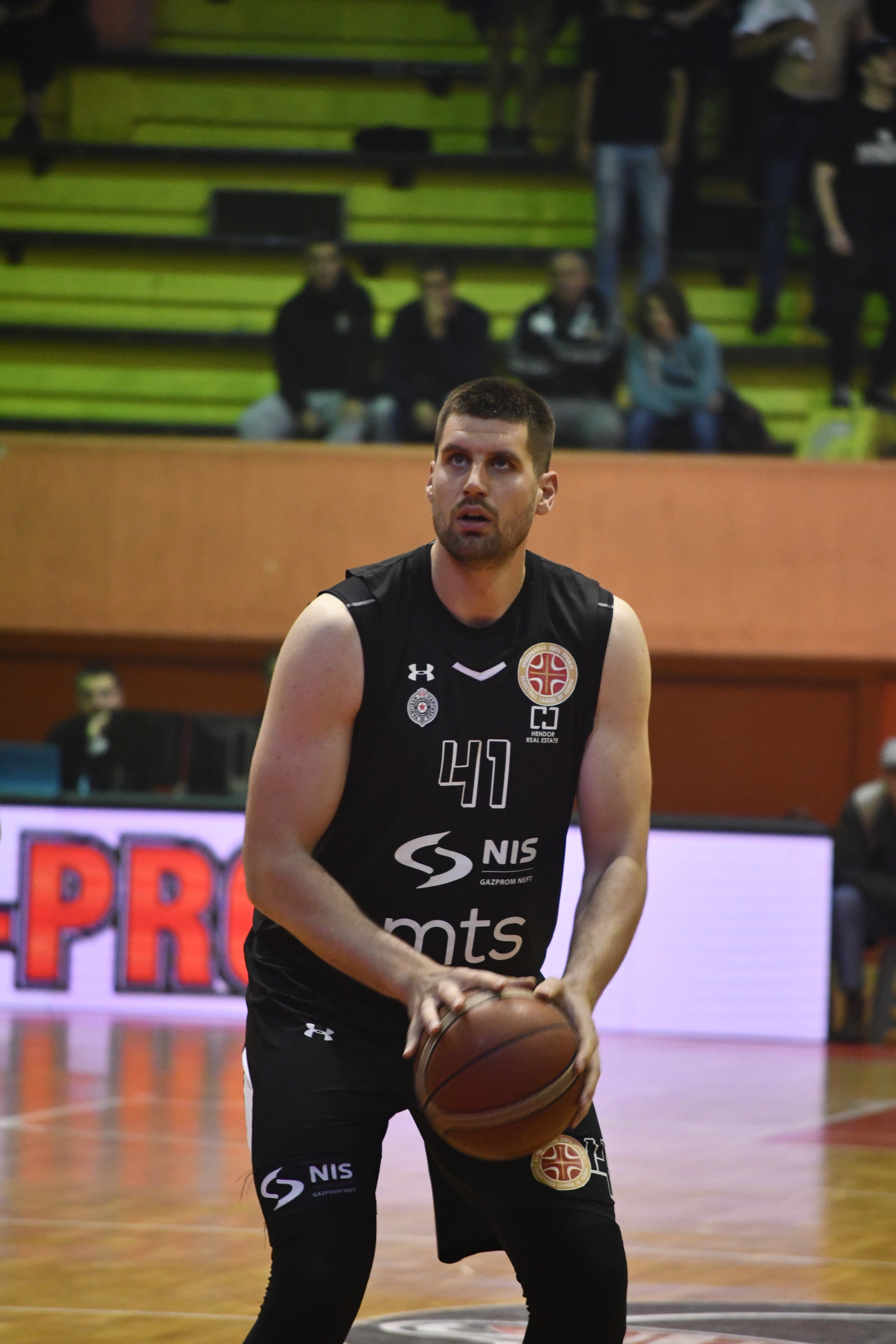
- Gagić with Partizan in 2019

No. 41 – Radnički Beograd
- Position: Center
- League: KLS

Personal information
- Born: 28 December 1990 (age 35) Benkovac, SR Croatia, Yugoslavia
- Listed height: 2.11 m (6 ft 11 in)
- Listed weight: 125 kg (276 lb)

Career information
- NBA draft: 2012: undrafted
- Playing career: 2009–present

Career history
- 2009–2011: Mornar
- 2011–2012: Hemofarm
- 2012–2015: Partizan
- 2015: Gaziantep
- 2015–2016: Brindisi
- 2016: Iberostar Tenerife
- 2016–2017: Tsmoki-Minsk
- 2017: İstanbul BB
- 2017: Yeşilgiresun Belediye
- 2018–2019: Partizan
- 2019: Aris Thessaloniki
- 2019–2020: Igokea
- 2020–2022: Lietkabelis Panevėžys
- 2022: ADA Blois
- 2022–2023: Borac Čačak
- 2023–2024: BC Wolves
- 2024: Lietkabelis Panevėžys
- 2024: Borac Čačak
- 2024–2025: Lietkabelis Panevėžys
- 2025: Guangxi Rhinos
- 2025–2026: Kalleh Mazandaran
- 2026: Shabab Al Ahli
- 2026–present: Radnički Beograd

Career highlights
- ABA League champion (2013); 2× Serbian League champion (2013, 2014); Bosnian League champion (2020); 2× Serbian Cup winner (2018, 2019); Belarusian League champion (2017)
Medals
Men's basketball
Representing Serbia
Universiade
Bronze medal – third place	2013 Kazan	Team competition

Đorđe Gagić (Serbian Cyrillic: Ђорђе Гагић, born 28 December 1990) is a Serbian professional basketball player for Radnički Beograd of the Basketball League of Serbia (KLS). He also represented the Serbian national basketball team in international competitions. Standing at 6 ft 11 in (2.11 m), he plays at the center position.

== Professional career ==
=== Early years ===
Gagić played youth basketball in FMP, Superfund, Vojvodina Srbijagas, and Crvena zvezda.

=== Mornar (2009–2011) ===
In December 2009, he signed for his first senior team, Mornar from Montenegro.

=== Hemofarm (2011–2012) ===
After two years spent playing for Morner, he signed for Serbian professional club Hemofarm until the end of 2011–12 season.

=== Partizan (2012–2015) ===
In July 2012, Gagić signed a four-year contract with the Serbian club Partizan. In his first season with Partizan, he won the Adriatic League and the Serbian League. In his second season, he won his second and club's 13th straight Basketball League of Serbia title by defeating Crvena zvezda with 3-1 in the final series. Despite him not having good season, he exploded in the final series averaging 12.5 points and 6 rebounds per game.

In the stumbling first half of 2014–15 season for Partizan, Gagić played the starting center position and averaged 9.6 points and 4 rebounds over 18 Adriatic League games. On 3 February 2015, Gagić requested a contract termination due to unpaid salaries, which the club publicly classified as 'treason' a day later.

=== Gaziantep (2015) ===
On 11 February 2015, Gagić terminated his contract with Partizan and signed with Royal Halı Gaziantep of the Turkish Basketball League for the rest of the season.

=== Brindisi (2015–2016) ===
On 3 August 2015, he signed a one-year contract with Italian club Enel Brindisi.

=== Iberostar Tenerife (2016) ===
On 30 April 2016, Gagić signed with Iberostar Tenerife for the rest of the 2015–16 ACB season.

=== Tsmoki-Minsk (2016–2017) ===
On 1 July 2016, Gagić signed with Tsmoki-Minsk for the 2016–17 season.

=== İstanbul BB (2017) ===
On 20 February 2017, he left Tsmoki-Minsk and signed with Turkish club İstanbul BB for the rest of the 2016–17 BSL season.

=== Yeşilgiresun Belediye (2017) ===
On 13 September 2017, Gagić signed with Yeşilgiresun Belediye for the 2017–18 BSL season. On 26 December 2017, he parted ways with Yeşilgiresun after averaging 8 points and 4 rebounds in BSL.

=== Return to Partizan (2018–2019) ===
On 3 January 2018, he returned to Partizan.

=== Aris Thessaloniki (2019) ===
On 23 September 2019, Gagić signed with Aris Thessaloniki of the Greek Basket League (GBL). On 13 November 2019, Gagić had his contract terminated by Aris.

=== Igokea (2019–2020) ===
On 13 November 2019, Gagić signed with Igokea of the Bosnian League and the ABA League. On 15 July 2020, he agreed to an extension with Igokea, but the contract was terminated just one month later.

=== Lietkabelis Panevėžys (2020–2022) ===
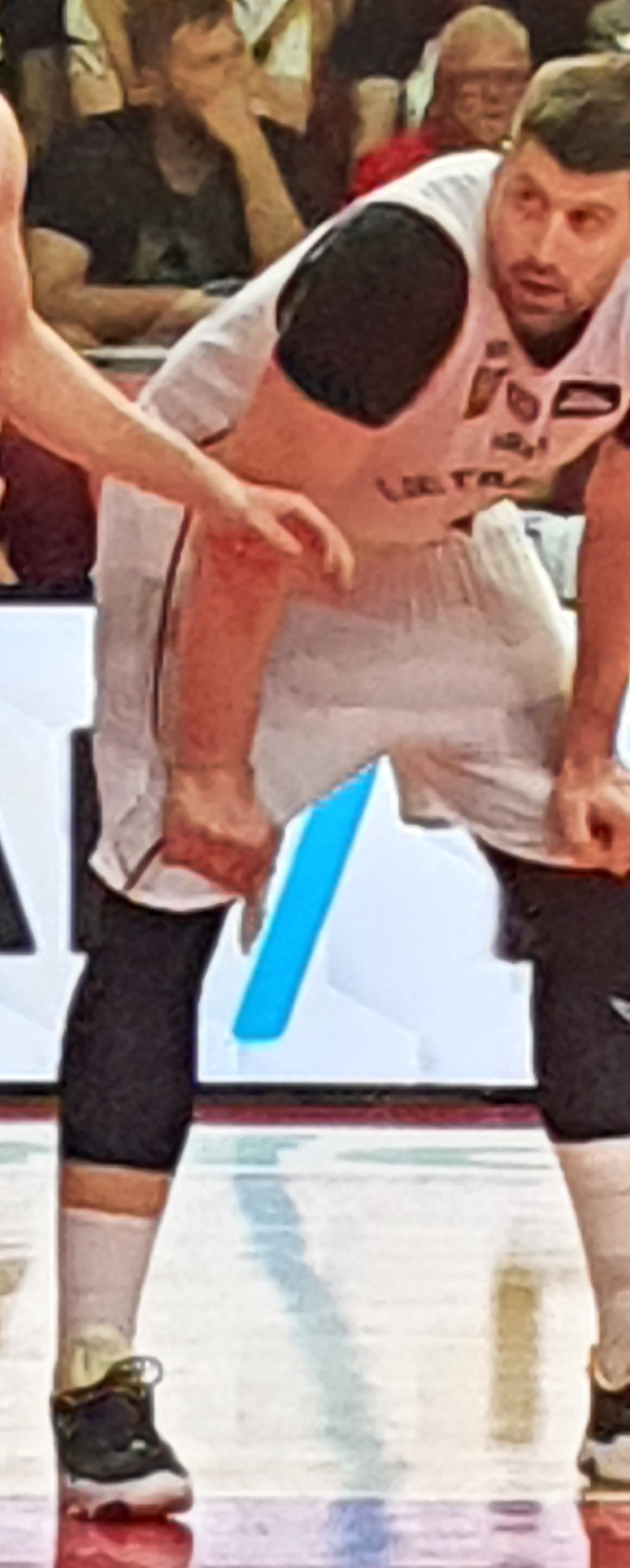
Gagić with Lietkabelis during the 2022 LKL Finals

On 5 December 2020, Gagić signed with Lietkabelis Panevėžys of the Lithuanian Basketball League (LKL).

=== ADA Blois (2022) ===
On 6 September 2022, he signed with ADA Blois Basket 41 of the LNB Pro A.

=== Borac Čačak (2022–2023) ===
On 29 December 2022, he signed with Borac Čačak of the Basketball League of Serbia.

=== BC Wolves (2023–2024) ===
On 9 August 2023, Gagić signed a one-year contract with BC Wolves of the Lithuanian Basketball League (LKL). On 20 January 2024, he parted ways with the club.

=== Return to Lietkabelis Panevėžys (2024) ===
On 17 May 2024, he returned to Lietkabelis.

=== Return to Borac Čačak (2024) ===
In August 2024, he signed once again with Borac Čačak.

On 21 December 2024, Gagić left Borak.

=== Third stint with Lietkabelis Panevėžys (2024) ===
On 21 December 2024, Gagić returned to Lietkabelis Panevėžys for a third stint, signing for the rest of the season.

=== Guangxi Rhinos (2025) ===
In 2025, Gagić signed with the Guangxi Rhinos of the Chinese National Basketball League.

=== Kalleh Mazandaran (2025–2026) ===
On 3 February 2025, Gagić signed with Kalleh Mazandaran of the Iranian Basketball Super League (IBSL).

=== Shabab Al Ahli (2026) ===
On 1 February 2026, Gagić signed with Shabab Al Ahli of the UAE National Basketball League.

=== Radnički Beograd (2026–present) ===
On 4 November 2026, Gagić signed with Radnički Beograd of the Basketball League of Serbia (KLS).

== National team career ==
Gagić represented Serbian national team at the FIBA EuroBasket 2013 in Slovenia. He averaged 3.5 points and 2.5 rebounds per game for Serbia.

== Career statistics ==
Legend
GP	Games played	GS	Games started	MPG	Minutes per game
FG%	Field-goal percentage	3P%	3-point field-goal percentage	FT%	Free-throw percentage
RPG	Rebounds per game	APG	Assists per game	SPG	Steals per game
BPG	Blocks per game	PPG	Points per game	PIR	Performance index rating
**Bold**	Career high

=== Euroleague ===
Year	Team	GP	GS	MPG	FG%	3P%	FT%	RPG	APG	SPG	BPG	PPG	PIR
2012–13	Partizan	10	**2**	14.1	**.485**	.000	**.735**	3.3	.2	.3	.1	**5.7**	**5.4**
2013–14	Partizan	**23**	1	**15.0**	.382	.000	.632	**3.4**	**1.0**	**.5**	**.2**	3.3	3.6
Career		33	3	14.8	.416	.000	.681	3.4	.8	.4	.2	4.0	4.1

== See also ==
- List of Serbia men's national basketball team players
