= Donatas Sabeckis =

Lithuanian basketball player (born 1992)

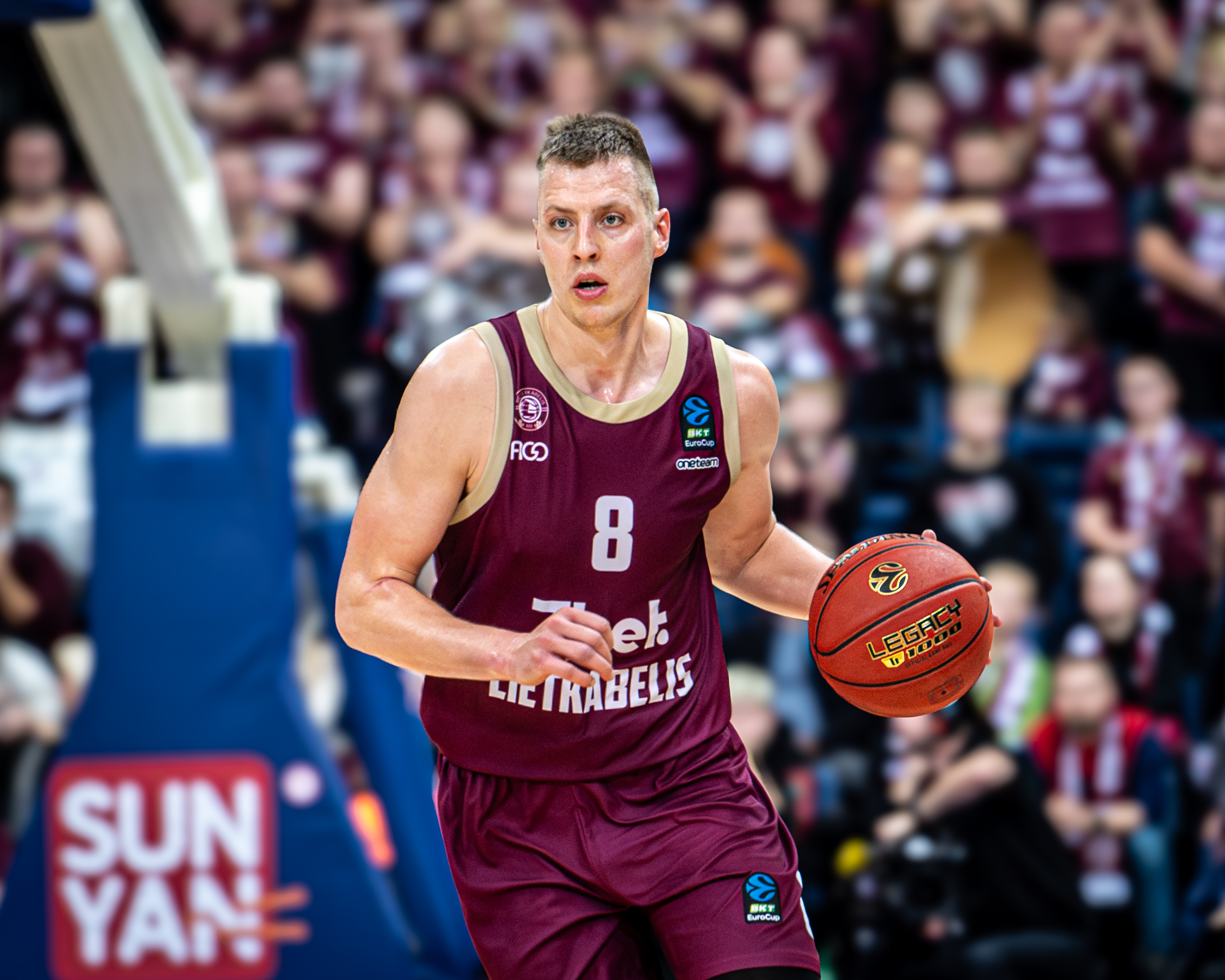
- Sabeckis with Lietkabelis in 2023

No. 3 – Jonava Hipocredit
- Position: Point guard
- League: LKL

Personal information
- Born: 30 December 1992 (age 33) Kaunas, Lithuania
- Listed height: 6 ft 6 in (1.98 m)
- Listed weight: 209 lb (95 kg)

Career information
- NBA draft: 2014: undrafted
- Playing career: 2011–present

Career history
- 2011–2014: JAZZ-Diremta Kaunas
- 2014–2016: Sūduva-Mantinga Marijampolė
- 2016–2018: BC Šiauliai
- 2018: Žalgiris
- 2018–2019: →MHP Riesen
- 2019: Cibona
- 2019–2020: CBet Prienai
- 2020–2021: Lions de Genève
- 2021–2023: BC Šiauliai
- 2023: Lietkabelis Panevėžys
- 2023–2024: Czarni Słupsk
- 2024–2025: M Basket Mažeikiai
- 2025–2026: Juventus Utena
- 2026: Golden Eagle Ylli
- 2026–present: Jonava Hipocredit

Career highlights
- All-Lithuanian League Team (2018); Lithuanian League assists leader (2018, 2023); Lithuanian League steals leader (2017)

Donatas Sabeckis (born 30 December 1992) is a Lithuanian professional basketball player and the team captain for Jonava Hipocredit of the Lithuanian Basketball League (LKL). He primarily plays as point guard, but can also play as shooting guard or small forward.

== Playing career ==
Born in Kaunas, Sabeckis started his professional career in JAZZ-Diremta, where he played in RKL and NKL leagues (third and second division). In 2013/2014 season he moved to Sūduva-Mantinga alongside his brother Deividas. In 2015/16 season Sabeckis won gold medals with the team and was named NKL Finals MVP.

In 2016/17 season he signed with Šiauliai of the LKL. On 23 April 2017 in game against BC Vytautas, Sabeckis recorded 20 points, 13 assists, 7 rebounds, 6 steals, and 37 efficiency points.

After a breakout 2017/2018 season, in which Sabeckis led LKL in assists, he was signed by Žalgiris on 6 August 2018. On 31 October, Sabeckis was loaned to German club MHP Riesen Ludwigsburg for the rest of the season. After a tumultuous year plagued with roster changes, and being out with an injury for almost three months, Sabeckis left the team on 3 June 2019, along with three more players.

On 21 July 2019, he parted ways with Žalgiris and signed with Croatian club Cibona.

For the 2020–2021 season, he signed a one-year contract with Lions de Genève, a Swiss professional club in 1st division (SBL League). He won two national titles during this season, the SBL Cup and the Patrick Baumann Swiss Cup.

On 24 July 2021, Sabeckis signed two–year contract with BC Šiauliai.

On 13 September 2023, Sabeckis signed a three-month deal with Lietkabelis Panevėžys of the Lithuanian Basketball League (LKL) and the EuroCup.

On 13 December 2023, Sabeckis signed with Czarni Słupsk of the Polish Basketball League (PLK).

On 22 June 2024, Sabeckis signed one-year deal with M Basket Mažeikiai of the Lithuanian Basketball League (LKL).

On 31 October 2025, Sabeckis signed contract until the end of the 2025–26 season with Juventus Utena of the Lithuanian Basketball League (LKL).

On 8 August 2026, Sabeckis signed one–year contract with Jonava Hipocredit of the Lithuanian Basketball League (LKL).
