= Kristupas Žemaitis =

Lithuanian basketball player (born 1996)

- Žemaitis with the Lithuania national team

No. 13 – Neptūnas Klaipėda
- Position: Point guard/Shooting Guard
- League: LKL; EuroCup

Personal information
- Born: June 24, 1996 (age 30) Kaunas, Lithuania
- Listed height: 1.92 m (6 ft 4 in)
- Listed weight: 85 kg (187 lb)

Career information
- Playing career: 2014–present

Career history
- 2014–2017: Žalgiris-2 Kaunas
- 2017: Vytautas Prienai–Birštonas
- 2017–2019: BC Šiauliai
- 2019–2020: Nevėžis Kėdainiai
- 2020–2021: Dzūkija Alytus
- 2021–2022: Lietkabelis Panevėžys
- 2022–2025: Wolves Twinsbet
- 2025–2026: Manisa Basket
- 2026: Napoli Basket
- 2026–present: Neptūnas Klaipėda

Kristupas Žemaitis (born 24 June 1996) is a Lithuanian basketball player for Neptūnas Klaipėda of the Lithuanian Basketball League (LKL) and the EuroCup.

== Professional career ==
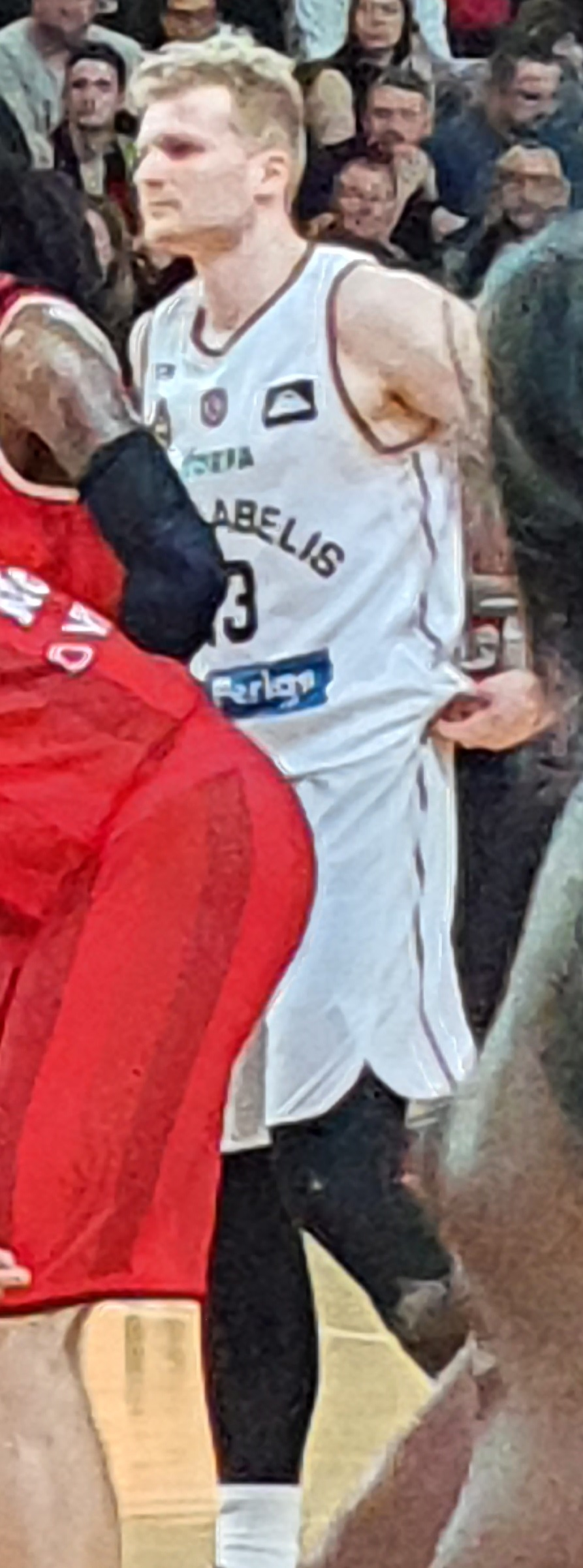
Žemaitis with the Lietkabelis Panevėžys during the 2022 LKL Finals

Žemaitis started his professional career when he signed with BC Žalgiris-2 in summer 2014. He spent 3 seasons with club. In 2015–16 season Žemaitis won silver medals with club, averaging 9 points and 3,4 assists per game.

In April 2017, Vytautas Prienai–Birštonas registered him for rest of the season, because, half of the team was injured, and by the LKL rules they can't sign any player who's older than 21 years old. He debuted against Kėdainiai Nėvėžis, scoring 6 points and making 1 assists.

On November 23, 2019, he has signed with Nevėžis Kėdainiai of the Lithuanian Basketball League.

On July 24, 2022, he has signed with BC Wolves of the Lithuanian Basketball League.

On August 6, 2025, he signed with Manisa Basket of the Basketbol Süper Ligi (BSL).

On March 5, 2026, he signed with Napoli Basket of the Italian Lega Basket Serie A (LBA).

On June 30, 2026, Žemaitis signed one–year contract with Neptūnas Klaipėda of the Lithuanian Basketball League (LKL) and the EuroCup.

== National team career ==
Žemaitis debuted for the Lithuania men's u-18 basketball team in the 2014 FIBA Europe Under-18 Championship in Turkey. Later that summer he won gold at 2014 Summer Youth Olympics, Basketball 3x3 Boys tournament hitting buzzer beater, in final game against France.

He won silver medals with the Lithuania men's national u-20 basketball team in 2016 FIBA Europe Under-20 Championship. After solid performance at tournament, he was selected to the All-Tournament Team.

Žemaitis won gold medal with the Lithuanian team during the 2017 Summer Universiade after defeating the United States' team 74–85 in the final.

Žemaitis represented the Lithuania men's national basketball team in EuroBasket 2022 where Lithuania finished 15th.

== Career statistics ==
Legend
GP	Games played	GS	Games started	MPG	Minutes per game
FG%	Field-goal percentage	3P%	3-point field-goal percentage	FT%	Free-throw percentage
RPG	Rebounds per game	APG	Assists per game	SPG	Steals per game
BPG	Blocks per game	PPG	Points per game	PIR	Performance index rating
**Bold**	Career high

=== EuroCup ===
Year	Team	GP	GS	MPG	FG%	3P%	FT%	RPG	APG	SPG	BPG	PPG	PIR
2021–22	Lietkabelis	**19**	10	25.4	.439	.329	.594	3.3	3.5	.8	.1	**8.4**	9.8
2023–24	Wolves Vilnius	18	**14**	**26.1**	**.495**	**.509**	**.765**	**3.8**	**3.9**	**1.1**	**.1**	8.4	**12.4**
Career		37	24	25.3	.467	.406	.653	1.0	3.7	1.0	.1	8.4	11.8
