= Palanga Arena =

Arena in Lithuania

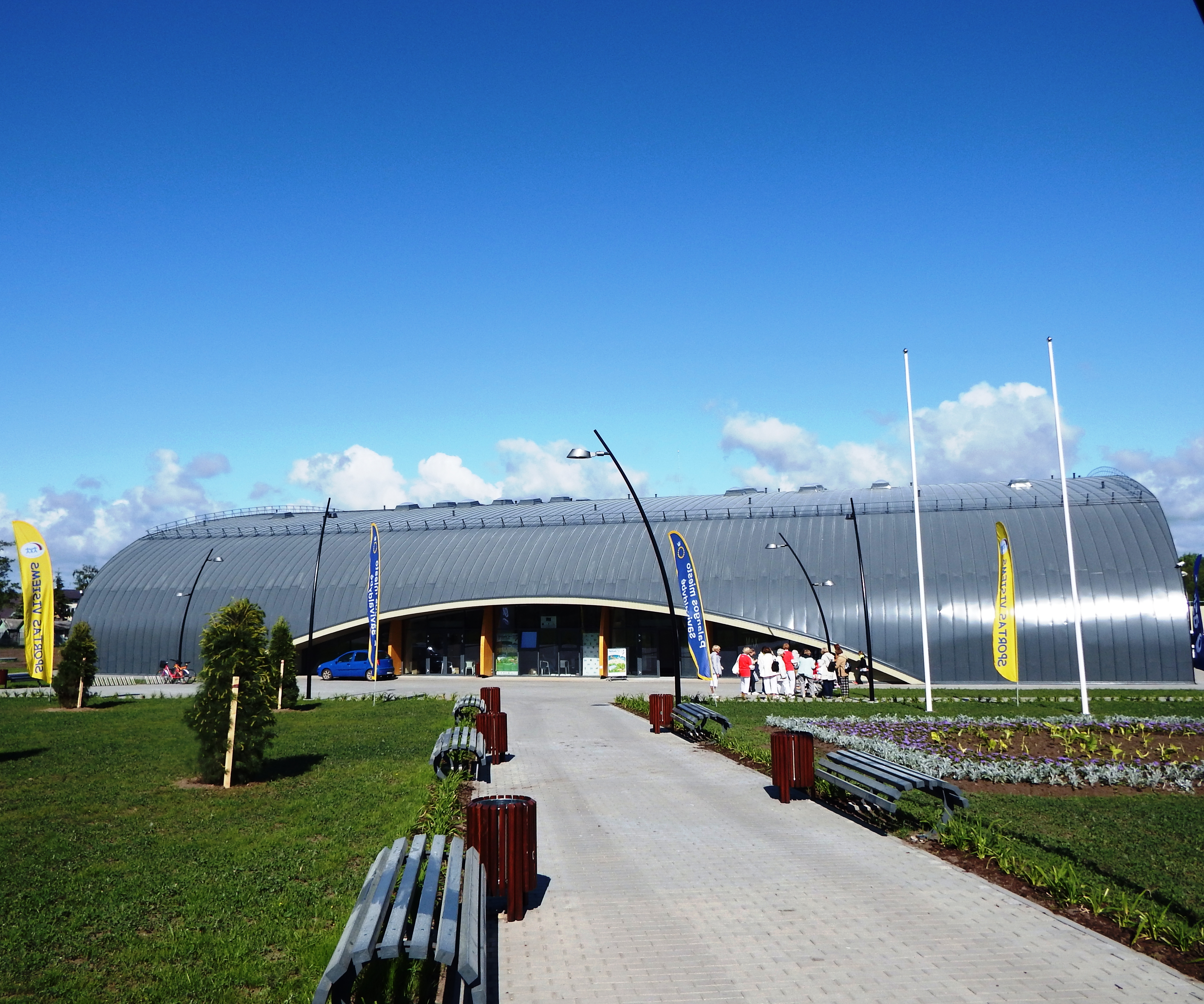
- Interactive map of Palanga Arena
- Location: Palanga, Lithuania
- Coordinates: 55°54′34″N 21°04′08″E
- Owner: Palanga City Municipality
- Capacity: 1,180

Construction
- Groundbreaking: 2012
- Opened: April 11, 2014
- Cost: 15 million LTL

Tenants
- BC Kuršiai; BC Gargždai (2022–2023)

Website
- sportpalanga.lt

Palanga Arena is a multifunctional arena in Palanga, Lithuania. It was opened on April 11, 2014. It was opened for the 3x3 basketball world championship qualification and National Basketball League final four matches.
