= Mindaugas Girdžiūnas =

Lithuanian basketball player

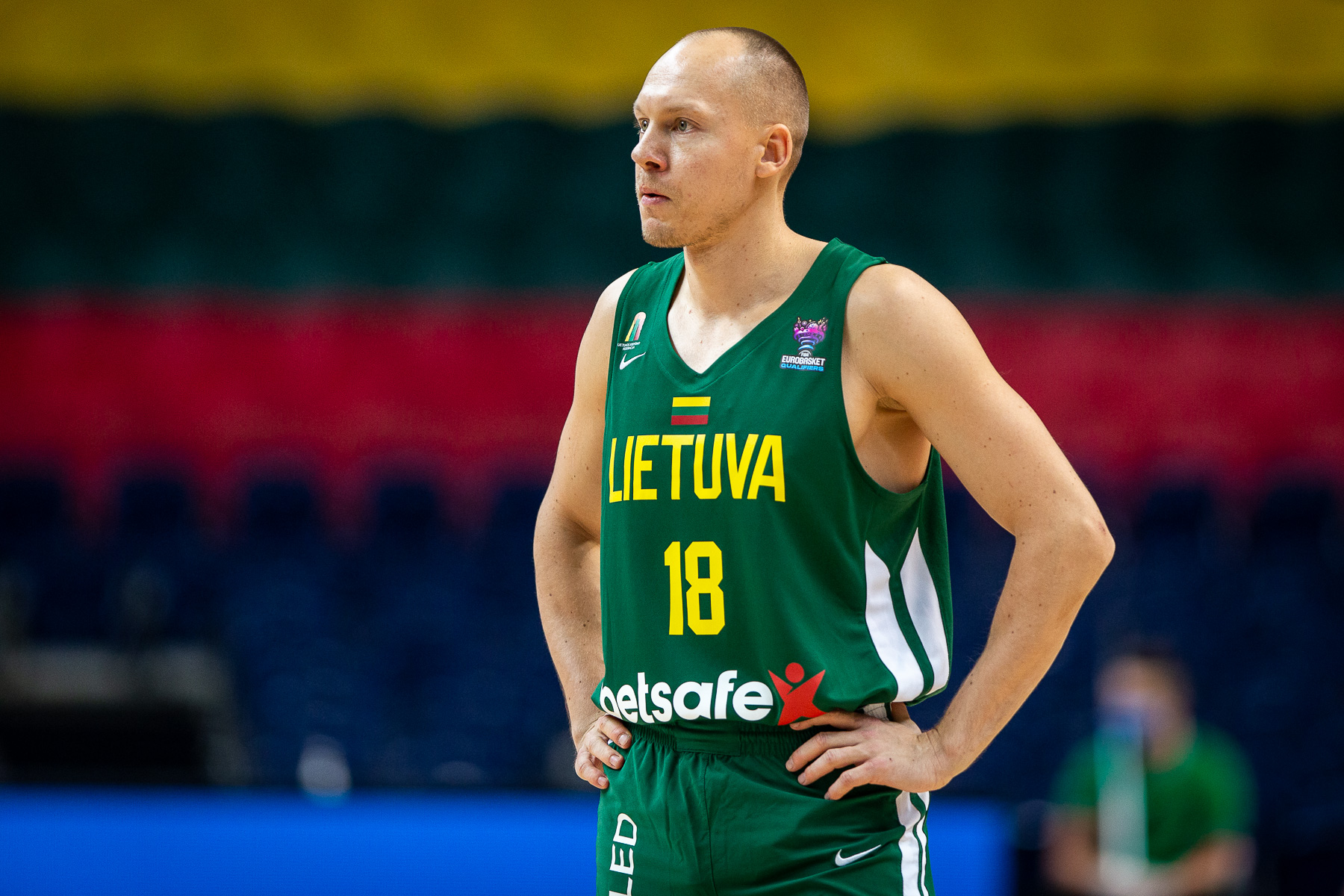
- Mindaugas Girdžiūnas in 2022

No. 8 – Neptūnas Klaipėda
- Position: Shooting guard / point guard
- League: LKL; EuroCup

Personal information
- Born: 9 January 1989 (age 37) Klaipėda, Lithuania
- Listed height: 1.88 m (6 ft 2 in)
- Listed weight: 86 kg (190 lb)

Career information
- NBA draft: 2011: undrafted
- Playing career: 2009–present

Career history
- 2009–2012: Neptūnas Klaipėda
- 2012–2013: Nevėžis Kėdainiai
- 2013–2017: Neptūnas Klaipėda
- 2017–2022: Lietuvos rytas Vilnius / Rytas Vilnius
- 2022-present: Neptūnas Klaipėda

Career highlights
- Lithuanian League champion (2022); King Mindaugas Cup winner (2019)

Mindaugas Girdžiūnas (born 20 January 1989) is a Lithuanian professional basketball player and the team captain for Neptūnas Klaipėda of the Lithuanian Basketball League (LKL) and the EuroCup.

== Professional career ==
Girdžiūnas joined Neptūnas in 2009, after showing good performance in Lithuanian third strongest basketball league - Regional Basketball League playing for Klaipėdos Tekoda. In 2011 January, he was loaned to Klaipėdos Nafta-Universitetas which plays in NKL.

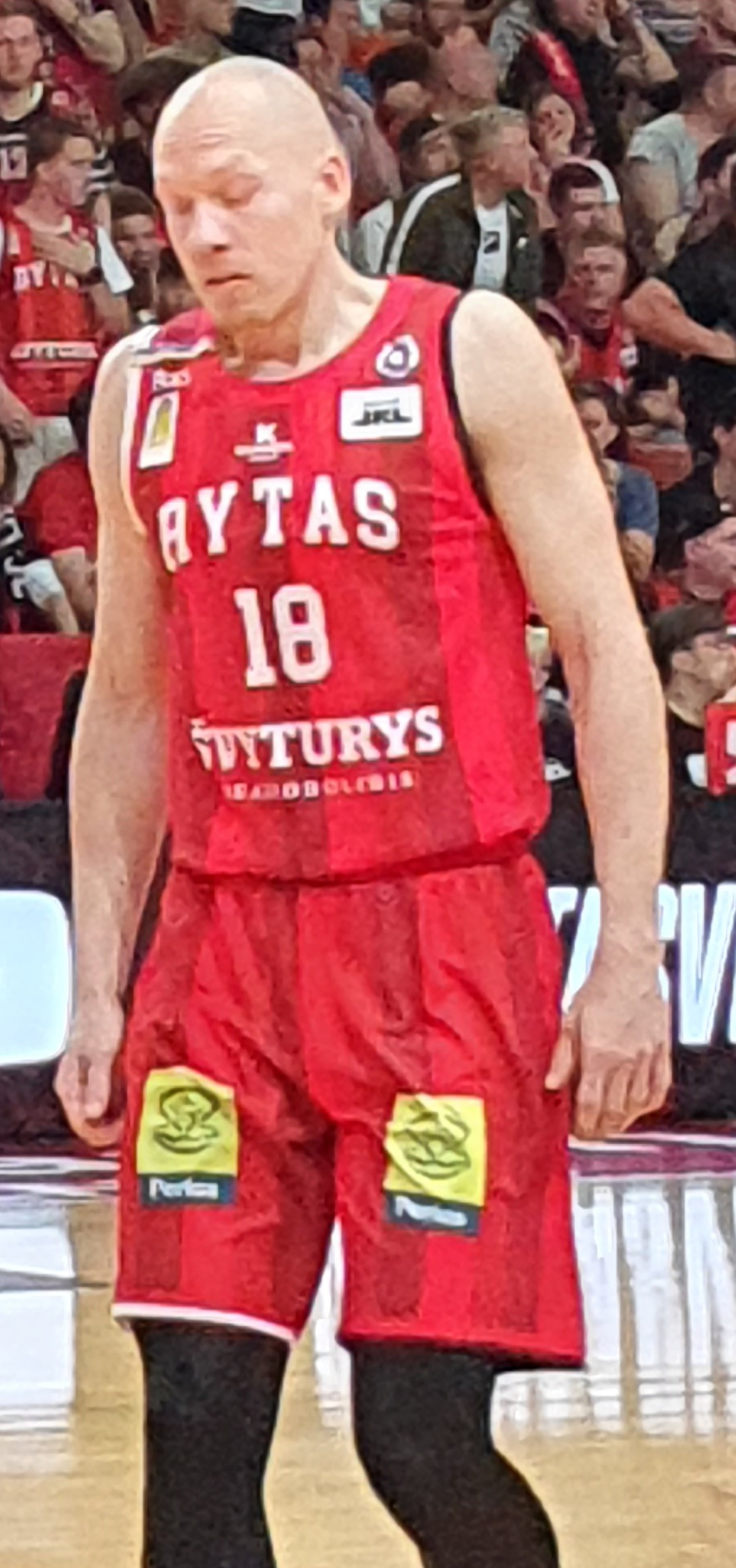
Girdžiūnas with the Rytas Vilnius during the 2022 LKL Finals

== International career ==
Following the solid season, in 2015 Girdžiūnas was included into the Lithuania men's national basketball team head coach Jonas Kazlauskas extended candidates list. Though, he was not invited into the training camp later on. Otherwise happened in 2016, when he was invited into the national team training camp for the first time. He was released from the team on July 14.

== Career statistics ==
Legend
GP	Games played	GS	Games started	MPG	Minutes per game
FG%	Field-goal percentage	3P%	3-point field-goal percentage	FT%	Free-throw percentage
RPG	Rebounds per game	APG	Assists per game	SPG	Steals per game
BPG	Blocks per game	PPG	Points per game	PIR	Performance index rating
**Bold**	Career high

=== EuroLeague ===
Year	Team	GP	GS	MPG	FG%	3P%	FT%	RPG	APG	SPG	BPG	PPG	PIR
2014–15	Neptūnas Klaipėda	**10**	**0**	**16.7**	**.311**	**.111**	**1**	**1.4**	**2.0**	**.2**	**.0**	**4.3**	**4.0**
Career		10	0	16.7	.311	.111	1	1.4	2.0	.2	.0	4.3	4.0

=== EuroCup ===
Year	Team	GP	GS	MPG	FG%	3P%	FT%	RPG	APG	SPG	BPG	PPG	PIR
2013–14	Neptūnas Klaipėda	10	4	16.3	.385	.294	.889	.8	2.2	.3	.1	4.3	3.2
2014–15	Neptūnas Klaipėda	6	0	17.6	**.500**	**.556**	**1**	1.0	**2.3**	.3	.0	6.7	6.8
2015–16	Neptūnas Klaipėda	12	1	18.8	.408	.306	.800	**1.3**	1.9	.3	**.2**	8.1	6.7
2017–18	Lietuvos rytas Vilnius	8	3	14.9	.442	.375	.833	.9	1.1	.3	.1	6.5	3.5
2018–19	Rytas Vilnius	17	**6**	**20.0**	.423	.478	.889	**1.3**	1.4	**.5**	.0	7.4	5.4
2019–20	Rytas Vilnius	16	1	14.1	.435	.410	.800	.7	1.3	.4	.0	5.5	3.6
2025–26	Neptūnas Klaipėda	**18**	1	18.9	.411	.411	.946	**1.3**	1.1	**.5**	.0	**8.7**	**7.0**
Career		87	16	17.5	.422	.407	.874	1.1	1.5	.4	.0	6.9	5.2
