= Giedrius Staniulis =

Lithuanian basketball player (born 1991)

Personal information
- Born: April 16, 1991 (age 35) Kaunas, Lithuania
- Listed height: 6 ft 9 in (2.06 m)
- Listed weight: 109 kg (240 lb)

Career information
- NBA draft: 2013: undrafted
- Playing career: 2007–2025
- Position: Center

Career history
- 2007–2009: KKM-Aisčiai-ARTRANSA
- 2009–2011: Perlas Vilnius
- 2011–2012: Techasas Panevėžys
- 2012–2013: Šarūnas Marčiulionis Academy
- 2013: JAZZ-KTU
- 2013–2014: Dzūkija Alytus
- 2014–2015: BC Prienai
- 2015: BC Mažeikiai
- 2015–2016: Pieno žvaigždės Pasvalys
- 2016–2018: BC Souffelweyersheim
- 2018: Nevėžis Kėdainiai
- 2018–2019: BC Orchies
- 2020: Caen Basket Calvados
- 2020: CBet Jonava
- 2020–2021: Dzūkija Alytus
- 2021–2022: BC Šiauliai
- 2022–2023: BC Gargždai-SC
- 2023–2025: M Basket Mažeikiai
- 2025: BC Šiauliai

Career highlights
- 2× Lithuanian League rebounding leader (2015, 2024)
Medals
Men's basketball
Representing Lithuania
FIBA Europe Under-18 Championship
| Silver medal – second place | 2008 Greece | U-18 Team |
FIBA Europe Under-16 Championship
| Bronze medal – third place | 2007 Greece | U-16 Team |

Giedrius Staniulis (born April 16, 1991) is a Lithuanian former professional basketball player. Standing at 2.06 m (6 ft 9 in), he mainly played at the center position.

== International career ==
Staniulis represented the Lithuanian youth squads twice. He won bronze medal with the U-16 National Team in 2007 FIBA Europe Under-16 Championship and silver medal with the U-18 National Team in 2008 FIBA Europe Under-18 Championship.
