= Evaldas Šaulys =

Lithuanian basketball player (born 1993)

No. 5 – BC Gargždai
- Position: Shooting guard
- League: LKL

Personal information
- Born: 4 March 1993 (age 33) Klaipėda, Lithuania
- Listed height: 191 cm (6 ft 3 in)
- Listed weight: 87 kg (192 lb)

Career information
- NBA draft: 2015: undrafted
- Playing career: 2011–present

Career history
- 2011–2014: Šilutė
- 2014–2016: Mažeikiai
- 2016–2017: Sūduva
- 2017–2020: Šiauliai
- 2020–2021: Neptūnas Klaipėda
- 2021–2022: CBet Jonava
- 2022-2023: Pieno žvaigždės Pasvalys
- 2023–2024: Juventus Utena
- 2024–2025: Zastal Zielona Góra
- 2025–2026: Juventus Utena
- 2026–present: BC Gargždai
Medals
Men's basketball
Representing Lithuania
Summer Universiade
Gold medal – first place	2017 Taipei	Team competition

Evaldas Šaulys (born 4 March 1993) is a Lithuanian professional basketball player and the team captain for BC Gargždai of the Lithuanian Basketball League (LKL).

== Professional career ==
On July 4, 2026, Šaulys signed with BC Gargždai of the Lithuanian Basketball League (LKL).

== National team career ==
Šaulys won a gold medal with the Lithuanian team at the 2017 Summer Universiade after defeating the United States' team 74–85 in the final.
