= Jonava Sports Arena =

Indoor arena in Jonava, Lithuania

- Interactive map of Jonava Sports Arena
- Address: Žeimių St. 17, LT-55134
- Location: Jonava, Lithuania
- Coordinates: 55°4′35″N 24°16′23″E
- Owner: Jonava District Municipality
- Capacity: Concerts 2,800; Basketball 2,200

Construction
- Groundbreaking: 2010
- Opened: 22 February 2017
- Cost: 9.4 million Euro
- Architect: UAB „Projektų centras“

Tenants
- BC Jonava; Achema-KKSC

Jonava Sports Arena is an indoor arena in Jonava, Lithuania. Mostly used for basketball and volleyball games.

== History ==
Although construction works started in 2010 arena was not opened until early 2017 due lack of funding. In 2015 fire started and spread across the roof of unfinished arena which resulted in more delays.
