= Utena Arena =

Sports venue in Utena, Lithuania

- Interactive map of Utena Arena
- Address: K. Donelaičio g. 30
- Location: Utena, Lithuania
- Coordinates: 55.50425°N 25.59143°E
- Capacity: 2,750 (basketball); 3,000 (concert)
- Record attendance: 3,128 (Juventus v. Žalgiris, 30 December 2017)

Construction
- Groundbreaking: October 30 2007
- Opened: April 30 2009
- Cost: 35 million LTL

Tenants
- BC Juventus (LKL, BBL)

Utena Arena is a sport arena in Utena, Lithuania. The construction started on 30 October 2007 and was completed on 30 April 2009. It cost 35 million LTL. Utena Arena is a home arena of BC Juventus basketball team which plays its home matches of the Lithuanian Basketball League and Baltic Basketball League.

== Gallery ==
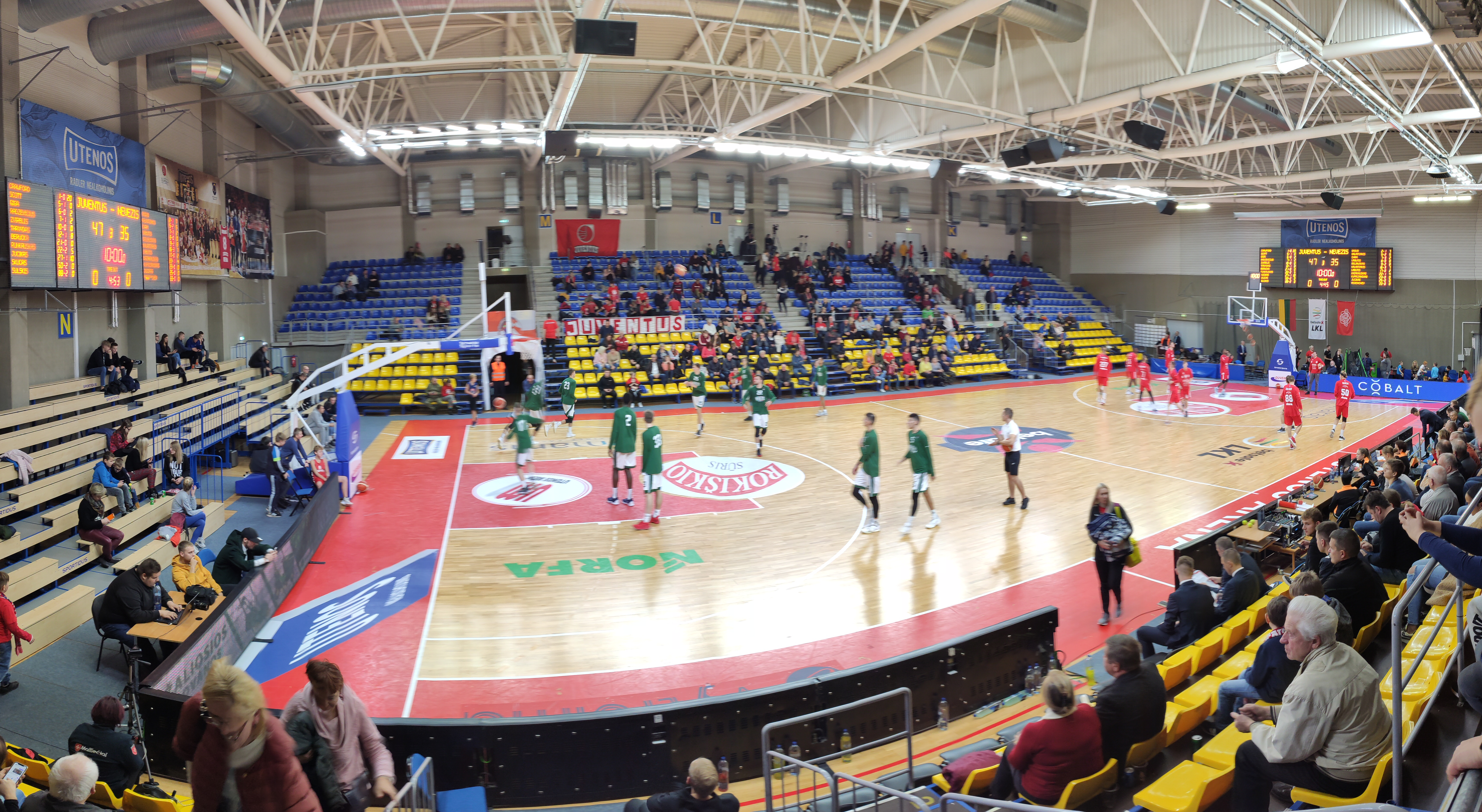
Interior of the Utena Arena during a basketball game of BC Juventus

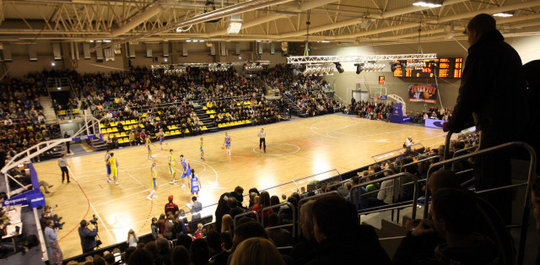
Interior of the Utena Arena during a basketball game
