= 2026–27 BC Žalgiris season =

BC Žalgiris
2026–27 season
- President: (Lithuanian Basketball Federation) Paulius Jankūnas
- Head coach: (Lithuanian Basketball Federation) Tomas Masiulis
- Arena: Žalgiris Arena
- LKL: Regular season
- EuroLeague: Regular season
- King Mindaugas Cup: Quarterfinals
- Highest home attendance: LKL: 6,746; Žalgiris 101–82 Šiauliai (27 September 2026) EuroLeague: 15,267; Žalgiris 91–93 Olympiacos (29 September 2026)
- Lowest home attendance: LKL: 2,750; Žalgiris 96–76 Tauragė (18 October 2026) EuroLeague: 14,618; Žalgiris 117–114 Bayern Munich (17 November 2026)
- Average home attendance: LKL: 4,388; EuroLeague: 14,960
- Biggest win: Žalgiris 97–68 Lietkabelis (4 October 2026)
- Biggest defeat: Žalgiris 70–85 Anadolu Efes (16 October 2026); Žalgiris 72–87 Panathinaikos AKTOR (19 November 2026)
Home	Away

The 2026–27 season is Žalgiris's 83rd in the existence of the club.

Times up to 24 October 2026 and from 28 March 2027 are EEST (UTC+3). Times from 25 October 2026 to 27 March 2027 are EET (UTC+2).

== Players ==
=== Current roster ===
Note: Flags indicate national team eligibility at FIBA-sanctioned events. Players may hold other non-FIBA nationalities not displayed.

Žalgiris roster
Players
Coaches

Pos.	No.	Nat.	Name	Ht.	Wt.	Age
G/F	0	(United States)	Brown, Sterling	1.96 m (6 ft 5 in)	99 kg (218 lb)	31 – 10 February 1995
PG	1	(United States)	Williams-Goss, Nigel (injured)	1.91 m (6 ft 3 in)	87 kg (192 lb)	32 – 16 September 1994
C	2	(Nigeria)	Akobundu-Ehiogu, Kaodirichi	2.08 m (6 ft 10 in)	110 kg (243 lb)	27 – 7 October 1999
SG	3	(United States)	Edwards, Carsen	1.84 m (6 ft 0 in)	91 kg (201 lb)	28 – 12 March 1998
PG	7	(United States)	Lee, Saben	1.88 m (6 ft 2 in)	83 kg (183 lb)	28 – 23 June 1998
PG	9	(Lithuania)	Giedraitis, Dovydas	1.93 m (6 ft 4 in)	93 kg (205 lb)	26 – 17 August 2000
F/C	10	(Lithuania)	Tubelis, Ąžuolas	2.09 m (6 ft 10 in)	111 kg (245 lb)	24 – 22 March 2002
G	12	(Germany)	Lô, Maodo	1.92 m (6 ft 4 in)	82 kg (181 lb)	33 – 31 December 1992
F/C	14	(United States)	Sleva, Dustin	2.03 m (6 ft 8 in)	102 kg (225 lb)	31 – 23 September 1995
C	17	(Lithuania)	Valančiūnas, Jonas	2.15 m (7 ft 1 in)	120 kg (265 lb)	34 – 6 May 1992
SG	21	(Lithuania)	Bulanovas, Majus	1.96 m (6 ft 5 in)	82 kg (181 lb)	19 – 15 May 2007
C	22	(Lithuania)	Blaževič, Marek	2.13 m (7 ft 0 in)	114 kg (251 lb)	25 – 1 September 2001
G	34	(United States)	Evans, Keenan	1.91 m (6 ft 3 in)	86 kg (190 lb)	30 – 23 August 1996
G/F	40	(Lithuania)	Grigonis, Marius	2.02 m (6 ft 8 in)	93 kg (205 lb)	32 – 26 April 1994
F	51	(Lithuania)	Butkevičius, Arnas	1.97 m (6 ft 6 in)	95 kg (209 lb)	34 – 22 November 1992
G/F	91	(Lithuania)	Sirvydis, Deividas	2.04 m (6 ft 8 in)	94 kg (207 lb)	26 – 10 June 2000
F	92	(Lithuania)	Ulanovas, Edgaras (C)	1.98 m (6 ft 6 in)	99 kg (218 lb)	34 – 7 January 1992

Head coach

- (Lithuania) Tomas Masiulis

Assistant coach(es)

- (Lithuania) Mantas Šernius
- (Lithuania) Renaldas Seibutis
- (Lithuania) Andrius Ulčickas
- (Denmark) Johs Andersen

Athletic trainer(s)

- (Lithuania) Žygimantas Janavičius
- (Lithuania) Justinas Grainys
- (Lithuania) Nerijus Navickas
- (Lithuania) Arnas Ikamas

Doctor(s)

- (Lithuania) Vytautas Kailius
- (Lithuania) Andrius Aukštakalnis

Physiotherapist(s)

- (Lithuania) Romas Petraitis

Legend

- (C) Team captain
- Injured

- Roster

=== EuroLeague Depth chart ===
Pos.	Starting 5	Bench 1	Bench 2	Bench 3	Inactive
C	Jonas Valančiūnas	Dustin Sleva	Kaodirichi Akobundu-Ehiogu	Marek Blaževič
PF	Ąžuolas Tubelis	Edgaras Ulanovas
SF	Arnas Butkevičius	Sterling Brown		Deividas Sirvydis
SG	Carsen Edwards	Marius Grigonis		Majus Bulanovas
PG	Keenan Evans	Saben Lee	Maodo Lô	Dovydas Giedraitis	Nigel Williams-Goss (injured)

=== LKL Depth chart ===
Pos.	Starting 5	Bench 1	Bench 2	Bench 3	Inactive
C	Marek Blaževič	Kaodirichi Akobundu-Ehiogu*	Ąžuolas Tubelis	Jonas Valančiūnas
PF	Dustin Sleva*	Edgaras Ulanovas		Arnas Butkevičius
SF	Deividas Sirvydis	Sterling Brown*		Marius Grigonis
SG	Dovydas Giedraitis	Carsen Edwards*	Majus Bulanovas
PG	Maodo Lô*	Saben Lee*		Keenan Evans*	Nigel Williams-Goss* (injured)

- In the LKL, official rules govern game-day rosters, import/foreign player limits, and registration guidelines rather than a fixed on-court substitution rotation. Up to 12 players can be listed on the official score sheet/roster for a single game. Clubs are permitted to register up to 6 non-Lithuanian players per match.

Foreign players are shown with an asterisk (*).

=== Loaned Out ===
No.	Pos.	Nat.	Name	Moving to		Type	Date	Source
	SF	(United States)	Maxwell Lewis	London Lions	(United Kingdom)	Out on loan	17 June 2026	
	SG	(Lithuania)	Mantas Rubštavičius	Tofaş	(Turkey)	Out on loan	9 November 2026	
	PG	(Lithuania)	Dominykas Grunkis	London Lions	(United Kingdom)	Out on loan	15 November 2026	

=== Squad changes for the 2026–27 season ===
==== In ====
No.	Pos.	Nat.	Name	Moving from		Type	Date	Source
2	C	(Nigeria)	Kaodirichi Akobundu-Ehiogu	Manresa	(Spain)	Transfer	2 August 2026	
3	SG	(United States)	Carsen Edwards	Virtus Bologna	(Italy)	End of contract	20 June 2026	
7	G	(United States)	Saben Lee	Anadolu Efes	(Turkey)	End of contract	16 June 2026	
0	G/F	(United States)	Sterling Brown	Partizan	(Serbia)	Transfer	7 July 2026	
17	C	(Lithuania)	Jonas Valančiūnas	Denver Nuggets	(United States)	End of contract	15 July 2026	
22	C	(Lithuania)	Marek Blaževič	Tofaş	(Turkey)	End of contract	19 June 2026	
40	G/F	(Lithuania)	Marius Grigonis	Panathinaikos	(Greece)	Parted ways	20 June 2026	
34	G	(United States)	Keenan Evans	London Lions	(United Kingdom)	Recalled off loan	23 October 2026	

==== Out ====
No.	Pos.	Nat.	Name	Moving to		Type	Date	Source
3	PG	(France) (United States)	Sylvain Francisco	Panathinaikos	(Greece)	Buyout	1 July 2026	
7	C	(United States)	Moses Wright	Olimpia Milano	(Italy)	End of contract	18 June 2026	
8	F	(Canada) (Lithuania)	Ignas Brazdeikis	Unicaja Málaga	(Spain)	End of contract	18 June 2026	
15	C	(Lithuania)	Laurynas Birutis	Basket Zaragoza	(Spain)	End of contract	18 June 2026	
17	SG	(Lithuania)	Mantas Rubštavičius	Auburn Tigers	(United States)	End of contract	15 June 2026	

== Pre-season and friendlies ==
=== Friendly matches ===
29 August 2026	Žalgiris (Lithuanian Basketball Federation)	97–85	(Latvian Basketball Association) Rīgas Zeļļi	Kaunas
18:00	Scoring by quarter: 24–15, 14–22, 34–24, 25–24
	Pts: Valančiūnas 20; Rebs: Valančiūnas 9 Asts: Giedraitis 7 PIR: Valančiūnas 28	Boxscore	Pts: Varnas 17; Rebs: Wahl 8 Asts: Perkins 3 PIR: Varnas 22	Arena: Žalgiris Arena

2 September 2026	Žalgiris (Lithuanian Basketball Federation)	82–77	(Lithuanian Basketball Federation) Juventus	Kaunas
18:00	Scoring by quarter: 18–23, 27–10, 19–26, 18–18
	Pts: Valančiūnas 14; Rebs: Valančiūnas 9 Asts: Williams-Goss 6 PIR: Valančiūnas 20	Boxscore	Pts: Hunter, Pohto 14; Rebs: Reynolds 5 Asts: Huntley-Hatfield 4 PIR: Pohto 15	Arena: Žalgiris Arena

6 September 2026	Žalgiris (Lithuanian Basketball Federation)	112–78	(Azerbaijan Basketball Federation) Sabah BC	Kaunas
18:00	Scoring by quarter: 28–20, 28–16, 29–19, 27–23
	Pts: Ulanovas 18; Rebs: Brown 8 Asts: Williams-Goss 8 PIR: Ulanovas 27	Boxscore	Pts: Manning 20; Rebs: Ballard 7 Asts: Blakes 5 PIR: Manning 19	Arena: Žalgiris Arena

10 September 2026 London Lions Invitational	Paris Basketball (French Federation of Basketball)	83–82	(Lithuanian Basketball Federation) Žalgiris	Stratford
22:30	Scoring by quarter: 21–15, 24–18, 21–28, 17–21
	Pts: Hifi 24; Rebs: Dokossi 8 Asts: Hifi 7 PIR: Hifi 28	Boxscore	Pts: Edwards 17; Rebs: Valančiūnas 13; Asts: Williams-Goss 11; PIR: Valančiūnas, Williams-Goss 22	Arena: Copper Box Arena

11 September 2026 London Lions Invitational	Śląsk Wrocław (Polish Basketball Federation)	55–86	(Lithuanian Basketball Federation) Žalgiris	Stratford
19:30	Scoring by quarter: 16–19, 16–21, 9–24, 14–22
	Pts: Robinson 15	Boxscore	Pts: Sleva 17; Rebs: Valančiūnas 7 Asts: Giedraitis, Valančiūnas 4 PIR: Valančiūnas 26	Arena: Copper Box Arena

== Competitions ==
=== Overview ===
Competition	First match	Last match	Starting round	Record							
Competition	First match	Last match	Starting round	Pld	W	D	L	PF	PA	PD	Win %
LKL	17 September 2026		Regular season	11	11	0	0	1,049	861	+188	100.00
EuroLeague	24 September 2026		Regular season	13	8	0	5	1,115	1,094	+21	61.54
King Mindaugas Cup	TBA		Quarterfinals	0	0	0	0	0	0	+0	—
Total				24	19	0	5	2,164	1,955	+209	79.17

Last updated: 22 November 2026
Source: Competitions

=== LKL ===
==== League table ====
Pos	Team	Pld	W	L	PF	PA	PD	Qualification or relegation
1	Žalgiris	11	11	0	1049	861	+188	Advance to playoffs
2	Gargždai	11	7	4	986	964	+22	Advance to playoffs
3	Rytas	10	6	4	910	865	+45	Advance to playoffs
4	Lietkabelis	11	6	5	891	926	−35	Advance to playoffs
5	Neptūnas	11	6	5	954	931	+23	Advance to playoffs

Updated to match(es) played on 22 November 2026. Source: LKL.lt

==== Results summary ====
Overall						Home					Away				
Pld	W	L	PF	PA	PD	W	L	PF	PA	PD	W	L	PF	PA	PD
11	11	0	1049	861	+188	5	0	467	371	+96	6	0	582	490	+92

Source: Competitive matches

==== Results by round ====
Round	1	2	3	4	5	6	7	8	9	10	11	12	13	14	15	16	17	18	19	20	21	22	23	24	25	26	27	28	29	30	31	32	33	34	35	36
Ground	A	A	H	H	A	H	H	A	A	H	A	H	A	H	A	A	H	H	H	A	H	A	A	H	H	H	A	A	A	H	A	A	H	A	H	H
Result	W	W	W	W	W	W	W	W	W	W	W																									
Position	1	1	1	1	1	1	1	1	1	1	1	1	1	1																						

Source: Competitive matches
A = Away; H = Home; W = Win; L = Loss; R = Rest

==== Matches ====
17 September 2026 1	Gargždai	77–98	Žalgiris	Gargždai
18:50	Scoring by quarter: 18–23, 19–21, 20–28, 20–26
	Pts: Davis 16; Rebs: Wilson 8 Asts: Davis 6 PIR: Davis, Mikalauskas 15	Boxscore	Pts: Brown 15; Rebs: Brown 6 Asts: Williams-Goss 7 PIR: Valančiūnas 16	Arena: Gargždų Arena; Attendance: 1,500; Referees: Juozas Barkauskas, Andžej Urbanovič, Ignas Kutka

20 September 2026 2	Neptūnas	69–93	Žalgiris	Klaipėda
16:50	Scoring by quarter: 18–20, 16–20, 17–21, 18–32
	Pts: Friðriksson 17; Rebs: Echodas 7 Asts: Friðriksson 6 PIR: Friðriksson 18	Boxscore	Pts: Blaževič 15; Rebs: Valančiūnas 7 Asts: Williams-Goss 7 PIR: Blaževič 21	Arena: Švyturys Arena; Attendance: 4,698; Referees: Artūras Šukys, Dovydas Kairys, Deividas Mačiulskis

27 September 2026 3	Žalgiris	101–82	Šiauliai	Kaunas
16:50	Scoring by quarter: 21–19, 27–18, 32–19, 21–26
	Pts: Edwards 19; Rebs: Blaževič 5 Asts: Giedraitis 6 PIR: Blaževič 24	Boxscore	Pts: Henderson Jr. 15; Rebs: Reid 8 Asts: McKnight 6 PIR: McKnight 16	Arena: Žalgiris Arena; Attendance: 6,746; Referees: Gytis Vilius, Aurimas Borusas, Vidmantas Rušinas

4 October 2026 4	Žalgiris	97–68	Lietkabelis	Kaunas
16:50	Scoring by quarter: 20–21, 29–19, 23–12, 25–16
	Pts: Grigonis 17; Rebs: Valančiūnas 7 Asts: Edwards 6 PIR: Valančiūnas 24	Boxscore	Pts: Schumacher 21; Rebs: Maldūnas 5 Asts: Jaramaz 4 PIR: Schumacher 22	Arena: Žalgiris Arena; Attendance: 4,115; Referees: Artūras Šukys, Saulius Račys, Gabrielius Simonavičius

11 October 2026 5	Nevėžis-Paskolų klubas	76–80	Žalgiris	Kėdainiai
17:00	'Scoring by quarter: 22–16, 18–18, 19–25, 17–21
	Pts: Andrews 15; Rebs: Wiley 7 Asts: Wiley, Zakas 4	Boxscore	Pts: Grigonis 19; Rebs: Sleva 6 Asts: Grigonis 6	Arena: Kėdainiai Arena; Referees: Gintaras Mačiulis, Gabrielius Simonavičius, Ignas Kutka

18 October 2026 6	Žalgiris	96–76	Tauragė	Kaunas
19:10	Scoring by quarter: 25–23, 18–19, 30–14, 23–20
	Pts: Valančiūnas 21; Rebs: Valančiūnas 7 Asts: Butkevičius 5 PIR: Valančiūnas 29	Boxscore	Pts: Blackmon Jr., Jackson 15; Rebs: Bratanovic 6 Asts: Jackson 5 PIR: Blackmon Jr. 17	Arena: Žalgiris Arena; Attendance: 2,750; Referees: Artūras Šukys, Jurgis Laurinavičius, Vidmantas Rušinas

25 October 2026 7	Žalgiris	86–63	Jonava Hipocredit	Kaunas
16:50	Scoring by quarter: 24–15, 17–11, 24–14, 21–23
	Pts: Sirvydis; Rebs: Four players 5 Asts: Four players 4 PIR: Sirvydis 19	Boxscore	Pts: Johnson; Rebs: Arlauskas, Lambrecht 6 Asts: Arlauskas, Lambrecht 3 PIR: Arlauskas 12	Arena: Žalgiris Arena; Attendance: 3,956; Referees: Jurgis Laurinavičius, Darius Šomka, Vidmantas Rušinas

2 November 2026 8	Rytas	89–94	Žalgiris	Vilnius
16:50	Scoring by quarter: 21–25, 28–17, 20–28, 20–24
	Pts: Marčiulionis 24; Rebs: Radzevičius 7 Asts: Devoe 6 PIR: Marčiulionis 27	Boxscore	Pts: Sleva 24; Rebs: Sleva 9 Asts: Giedraitis 4 PIR: Sleva 31	Arena: Arena Vilnius; Attendance: 8,223; Referees: Gytis Vilius, Artūras Šukys, Gvidas Gedvilas

8 November 2026 9	Juventus	85–94	Žalgiris	Utena
16:50	Scoring by quarter: 17–21, 25–27, 20–12, 23–34
	Pts: Beliauskas 21; Rebs: Hunter 6 Asts: Pagenkopf 5 PIR: Beliauskas, Hunter 23	Boxscore	Pts: Ulanovas 23; Rebs: Blaževič 10; Asts: Lee 6 PIR: Ulanovas 23	Arena: Utena Arena; Attendance: 2,968; Referees: Gvidas Gedvilas, Jurgis Laurinavičius, Ignas Jablonskas

15 November 2026 10	Žalgiris	87–82	Neptūnas	Kaunas
16:50	Scoring by quarter: 23–29, 25–14, 21–25, 18–14
	Pts: Lee 21; Rebs: Tubelis 7 Asts: Lee 5 PIR: Lee 31	Boxscore	Pts: Franke; Rebs: Echodas, Drell 9 Asts: Friðriksson 5 PIR: Franke 22	Arena: Žalgiris Arena; Attendance: 4,372; Referees: Artūras Šukys, Andžej Urbanovič, Vidmantas Rušinas

22 November 2026 11	Lietkabelis	94–123	Žalgiris	Panevėžys
16:50	Scoring by quarter: 27–33, 19–28, 30–31, 18–31
	Pts: Kennedy 24; Rebs: Kennedy, Sy 3 Asts: Schumacher 4 PIR: Kennedy 25	Boxscore	Pts: Blaževič 21; Rebs: Blaževič 8 Asts: Lee 6 PIR: Blaževič 26	Arena: Kalnapilio Arena; Attendance: 4,357; Referees: Gytis Vilius, Gvidas Gedvilas, Ignas Jablonskas

6 December 2026 12	Žalgiris	vs.	Rytas	Kaunas
16:50
		Boxscore		Arena: Žalgiris Arena

12 December 2026 13	Tauragė	vs.	Žalgiris	Tauragė
17:00
		Boxscore		Arena: Tauragė Arena

20 December 2026 14	Žalgiris	vs.	Nevėžis-Paskolų klubas	Kaunas
16:50
		Boxscore		Arena: Žalgiris Arena

26 December 2026 15	Jonava Hipocredit	vs.	Žalgiris	Jonava
16:50
		Boxscore		Arena: Jonava Arena

17 January 2027 16	Šiauliai	vs.	Žalgiris	Šiauliai
17:00
		Boxscore		Arena: Šiauliai Arena

24 January 2027 17	Žalgiris	vs.	Gargždai	Kaunas
16:50
		Boxscore		Arena: Žalgiris Arena

31 January 2027 18	Žalgiris	vs.	Juventus	Kaunas
16:50
		Boxscore		Arena: Žalgiris Arena

7 February 2027 19	Žalgiris	vs.	Tauragė	Kaunas
16:50
		Boxscore		Arena: Žalgiris Arena

14 February 2027 20	Nevėžis-Paskolų klubas	vs.	Žalgiris	Kėdainiai
19:10
		Boxscore		Arena: Kėdainiai Arena

17 February 2027 21	Žalgiris	vs.	Jonava Hipocredit	Kaunas
18:50
		Boxscore		Arena: Žalgiris Arena

7 March 2027 22	Lietkabelis	vs.	Žalgiris	Panevėžys
16:50
		Boxscore		Arena: Kalnapilio Arena

14 March 2027 23	Neptūnas	vs.	Žalgiris	Klaipėda
16:50
		Boxscore		Arena: Švyturys Arena

21 March 2027 24	Žalgiris	vs.	Rytas	Kaunas
16:50
		Boxscore		Arena: Žalgiris Arena

29 March 2027 25	Žalgiris	vs.	Šiauliai	Kaunas
16:50
		Boxscore		Arena: Žalgiris Arena

4 April 2027 26	Žalgiris	vs.	Juventus	Kaunas
16:50
		Boxscore		Arena: Žalgiris Arena

11 April 2027 27	Gargždai	vs.	Žalgiris	Gargždai
17:00
		Boxscore		Arena: Gargždų Arena

18 April 2027 28	Rytas	vs.	Žalgiris	Vilnius
16:50
		Boxscore		Arena: Arena Vilnius

22 April 2027 29	Tauragė	vs.	Žalgiris	Tauragė
18:50
		Boxscore		Arena: Tauragė Arena

25 April 2027 30	Žalgiris	vs.	Neptūnas	Kaunas
16:50
		Boxscore		Arena: Žalgiris Arena

28 April 2027 31	Jonava Hipocredit	vs.	Žalgiris	Jonava
18:50
		Boxscore		Arena: Jonava Arena

2 May 2027 32	Šiauliai	vs.	Žalgiris	Šiauliai
16:50
		Boxscore		Arena: Šiauliai Arena

5 May 2027 33	Žalgiris	vs.	Gargždai	Kaunas
18:50
		Boxscore		Arena: Žalgiris Arena

9 May 2027 34	Juventus	vs.	Žalgiris	Utena
16:50
		Boxscore		Arena: Utena Arena

12 May 2027 35	Žalgiris	vs.	Lietkabelis	Kaunas
18:50
		Boxscore		Arena: Žalgiris Arena

16 May 2027 36	Žalgiris	vs.	Nevėžis-Paskolų klubas	Kaunas
19:10
		Boxscore		Arena: Žalgiris Arena

=== EuroLeague ===
==== League table ====
Pos	Team	Pld	W	L	PF	PA	PD	Qualification
6	(Basketball Federation of Serbia) Crvena zvezda Meridianbet	13	8	5	1071	1021	+50	Qualification to playoffs
7	(Spanish Basketball Federation) Barcelona	13	8	5	1149	1122	+27	Qualification to play-in
8	(Lithuanian Basketball Federation) Žalgiris	13	8	5	1115	1094	+21	Qualification to play-in
9	(Spanish Basketball Federation) Real Madrid	13	7	6	1227	1152	+75	Qualification to play-in
10	(Israeli Basketball Association) Hapoel IBI Tel Aviv	13	7	6	1175	1138	+37	Qualification to play-in

Updated to match(es) played on 20 November 2026. Source: EuroLeague
Rules for classification: Regular season tiebreakers

==== Results summary ====
Overall						Home					Away				
Pld	W	L	PF	PA	PD	W	L	PF	PA	PD	W	L	PF	PA	PD
13	8	5	1115	1094	+21	3	3	526	531	−5	5	2	589	563	+26

Last updated: 19 November 2026.
Source: Competitive matches

==== Results by round ====
Round	1	2	3	4	5	6	7	8	9	10	11	12	13	14	15	16	17	18	19	20	21	22	23	24	25	26	27	28	29	30	31	32	33	34	35	36	37	38
Ground	A	H	A	A	A	H	H	A	H	A	A	H	H	A	H	H	A	A	H	A	H	A	H	H	A	A	H	H	A	H	H	A	H	A	H	A	A	H
Result	W	L	L	W	L	L	W	W	W	W	W	W	L																									
Position	7	8	10	8	13	14	12	10	10	10	8	5	8																									

Updated to match(es) played on 30 October 2026. Source: Competitive matches
A = Away; H = Home; W = Win; L = Loss; P = Postponed

==== Matches ====
24 September 2026 1	Crvena zvezda Meridianbet (Basketball Federation of Serbia)	77–83	(Lithuanian Basketball Federation) Žalgiris	Belgrade
21:00	Scoring by quarter: 21–28, 24–15, 12–16, 20–24
	Pts: Jones 15; Rebs: Ojeleye 7 Asts: Jones 8 PIR: Jones 25	Boxscore	Pts: Williams-Goss 14; Rebs: Tubelis 12; Asts: Williams-Goss 6 PIR: Valančiūnas 24	Arena: Belgrade Arena; Attendance: 16,420; Referees: Carlos Peruga, Alberto Baena, Guido Giovannetti

29 September 2026 2	Žalgiris (Lithuanian Basketball Federation)	91–93	(Hellenic Basketball Federation) Olympiacos	Kaunas
20:00	Scoring by quarter: 24–21, 20–23, 19–20, 28–29
	Pts: Brown 20; Rebs: Tubelis 7 Asts: Valančiūnas 7 PIR: Tubelis 22	Boxscore	Pts: Fournier 19; Rebs: Vezenkov 8 Asts: Montero 7 PIR: Vezenkov 26	Arena: Žalgirio Arena; Attendance: 15,267; Referees: Saša Pukl, Emilio Pérez, Luka Kardum

1 October 2026 3	Paris Basketball (French Federation of Basketball)	82–78	(Lithuanian Basketball Federation) Žalgiris	Paris
21:45	Scoring by quarter: 17–19, 24–19, 20–15, 21–25
	Pts: Hifi 21; Rebs: Dokossi 8 Asts: Herrera, Rhoden 4 PIR: Dokossi 17	Boxscore	Pts: Tubelis 18; Rebs: Tubelis 7 Asts: Brown, Lô 4 PIR: Tubelis 25	Arena: Adidas Arena; Attendance: 3,746; Referees: Tomislav Hordov, Tomasz Trawicki, Uroš Obrknežević

9 October 2026 4	Barcelona (Spanish Basketball Federation)	81–88	(Lithuanian Basketball Federation) Žalgiris	Barcelona
21:30	Scoring by quarter: 18–23, 23–16, 24–16, 16–33
	Pts: Robinson 20; Rebs: Nebo 6 Asts: Gibson 3 PIR: Robinson 21	Boxscore	Pts: Edwards 19; Rebs: Valančiūnas 9 Asts: Edwards 7 PIR: Edwards 21	Arena: Palau Blaugrana; Attendance: 4,346; Referees: Milan Nedović, Sašo Petek, Hugues Thépénier

13 October 2026 5	Fenerbahçe Tarfin (Turkish Basketball Federation)	99–80	(Lithuanian Basketball Federation) Žalgiris	Istanbul
20:45	Scoring by quarter: 27–14, 23–29, 28–13, 21–24
	Pts: Shields 17; Rebs: Melli, Şanlı 4 Asts: Baldwin IV 7	Boxscore	Pts: Edwards 20; Rebs: Valančiūnas 10; Asts: Lee 4	Arena: Ülker Sports and Event Hall; Referees: Juan Carlos García González, Miloš Koljenšić, Anne Panther

16 October 2026 6	Žalgiris (Lithuanian Basketball Federation)	70–85	(Turkish Basketball Federation) Anadolu Efes	Kaunas
20:00	Scoring by quarter: 12–21, 24–21, 20–25, 14–18
	Pts: Edwards 16; Rebs: Valančiūnas 7 Asts: Lee 5 PIR: Valančiūnas 15	Boxscore	Pts: Strazel 19; Rebs: Šarić 10; Asts: Loyd 6 PIR: Strazel 22	Arena: Žalgiris Arena; Attendance: 15,133; Referees: Damir Javor, Thomas Bissuel, Steve Bittner

23 October 2026 7	Žalgiris (Lithuanian Basketball Federation)	105–85	(French Federation of Basketball) LDLC ASVEL	Kaunas
20:00	Scoring by quarter: 29–20, 21–14, 31–25, 24–26
	Pts: Edwards 16; Rebs: Valančiūnas 8 Asts: Lee 7 PIR: Valančiūnas 18	Boxscore	Pts: Besson 13; Rebs: Crowder 6 Asts: Washington 4 PIR: Crowder 16	Arena: Žalgirio Arena; Attendance: 14,834; Referees: Oļegs Latiševs, Kristaps Konstantinovs, Manuel Attard

28 October 2026 8	Virtus Bologna (Italian Basketball Federation)	74–91	(Lithuanian Basketball Federation) Žalgiris	Bologna
21:30	Scoring by quarter: 22–14, 13–23, 18–28, 21–26
	Pts: Alston Jr. 18; Rebs: Diarra 6 Asts: three players 3 PIR: Alston Jr., Diarra 16	Boxscore	Pts: Valančiūnas 17; Rebs: Tubelis, Valančiūnas 11; Asts: Lee 5 PIR: Tubelis, Valančiūnas 21	Arena: PalaDozza; Attendance: 5,471; Referees: Carlos Peruga, Jakub Zamojski, Ioannis Tiganis

30 October 2026 9	Žalgiris (Lithuanian Basketball Federation)	87–80	(Basketball Federation of Serbia) Partizan Mozzart Bet	Kaunas
20:00	Scoring by quarter: 27–21, 17–19, 25–17, 18–23
	Pts: Edwards 17; Rebs: Valančiūnas 8 Asts: Evans 6 PIR: Valančiūnas 25	Boxscore	Pts: Tanasković 19; Rebs: Thompson 6 Asts: Jones 7 PIR: Tanasković, Thompson 19	Arena: Žalgirio Arena; Attendance: 14,799; Referees: Emin Moğulkoç, Jordi Aliaga, Hugues Thépénier

6 November 2026 10	Beşiktaş (Turkish Basketball Federation)	67–83	(Lithuanian Basketball Federation) Žalgiris	Istanbul
19:00	Scoring by quarter: 17–20, 14–25, 13–17, 23–21
	Pts: Omoruyi 17; Rebs: Brown 9 Asts: Dotson 5 PIR: Omoruyi 20	Boxscore	Pts: Tubelis 14; Rebs: Valančiūnas 11; Asts: Butkevičius, Lee 3 PIR: Valančiūnas 23	Arena: Basketball Development Center; Attendance: 6,350; Referees: Juan Carlos García, Emilio Pérez, Mario Majkić

12 November 2026 11	Armani Olimpia Milan (Italian Basketball Federation)	83–86	(Lithuanian Basketball Federation) Žalgiris	Assago
21:30	Scoring by quarter: 25–18, 16–27, 11–18, 31–23
	Pts: Gudurić 20; Rebs: Ricci 6 Asts: Thompson 4 PIR: Gudurić 15	Boxscore	Pts: Valančiūnas 17; Rebs: Valančiūnas 20; Asts: Evans 5 PIR: Valančiūnas 36	Arena: Unipol Forum; Referees: Carlos Cortés, Luka Kardum, Alberto Baena

17 November 2026 12	Žalgiris (Lithuanian Basketball Federation)	117–114(OT)	(German Basketball Federation) Bayern Munich	Kaunas
20:00	Scoring by quarter: 19–25, 31–32, 28–22, 23–22, Overtime: 16–13
	Pts: Edwards 32; Rebs: Sleva 10; Asts: three players 4 PIR: Edwards 21	Boxscore	Pts: Thiemann 33; Rebs: Da Silva 12; Asts: Jokubaitis 5 PIR: Thiemann 34	Arena: Žalgirio Arena; Attendance: 14,618; Referees: Tomislav Hordov, Milivoje Jovčić, Thomas Bissuel

19 November 2026 13	Žalgiris (Lithuanian Basketball Federation)	72–87	(Hellenic Basketball Federation) Panathinaikos AKTOR	Kaunas
20:00	Scoring by quarter: 17–28, 22–19, 16–12, 17–28
	Pts: Tubelis 17; Rebs: Tubelis, Valančiūnas 6 Asts: Evans 6 PIR: Tubelis 21	Boxscore	Pts: Nunn 21; Rebs: Hayes-Davis, Yabusele 6 Asts: three players 3 PIR: Nunn 24	Arena: Žalgirio Arena; Attendance: 15,110; Referees: Saša Pukl, Seffi Shemmesh, Piotr Pastusiak

25 November 2026 14	Real Madrid (Spanish Basketball Federation)	vs.	(Lithuanian Basketball Federation) Žalgiris	Madrid
21:45
		Boxscore		Arena: Movistar Arena

4 December 2026 15	Žalgiris (Lithuanian Basketball Federation)	vs.	(United Arab Emirates Basketball Association) Dubai Basketball	Kaunas
20:00
		Boxscore		Arena: Žalgiris Arena

10 December 2026 16	Žalgiris (Lithuanian Basketball Federation)	vs.	(Spanish Basketball Federation) Kosner Baskonia	Kaunas
20:00
		Boxscore		Arena: Žalgiris Arena

15 December 2026 17	Maccabi Rapyd Tel Aviv (Israeli Basketball Association)	vs.	(Lithuanian Basketball Federation) Žalgiris	Belgrade
21:05
		Boxscore		Arena: Aleksandar Nikolić Hall

17 December 2026 18	Hapoel IBI Tel Aviv (Israeli Basketball Association)	vs.	(Lithuanian Basketball Federation) Žalgiris	Sofia
20:00
		Boxscore		Arena: Arena 8888 Sofia

23 December 2026 19	Žalgiris (Lithuanian Basketball Federation)	vs.	(Spanish Basketball Federation) Valencia Basket	Kaunas
20:00
		Boxscore		Arena: Žalgiris Arena

29 December 2026 20	Partizan Mozzart Bet (Basketball Federation of Serbia)	vs.	(Lithuanian Basketball Federation) Žalgiris	Belgrade
21:30
		Boxscore		Arena: Belgrade Arena

7 January 2027 21	Žalgiris (Lithuanian Basketball Federation)	vs.	(French Federation of Basketball) Paris Basketball	Kaunas
20:00
		Boxscore		Arena: Žalgiris Arena

12 January 2027 22	LDLC ASVEL (French Federation of Basketball)	vs.	(Lithuanian Basketball Federation) Žalgiris	Décines-Charpieu
21:00
		Boxscore		Arena: LDLC Arena

14 January 2027 23	Žalgiris (Lithuanian Basketball Federation)	vs.	(Basketball Federation of Serbia) Crvena zvezda Meridianbet	Kaunas
20:00
		Boxscore		Arena: Žalgiris Arena

22 January 2027 24	Žalgiris (Lithuanian Basketball Federation)	vs.	(Italian Basketball Federation) Virtus Bologna	Kaunas
20:00
		Boxscore		Arena: Žalgiris Arena

28 January 2027 25	Kosner Baskonia (Spanish Basketball Federation)	vs.	(Lithuanian Basketball Federation) Žalgiris	Vitoria-Gasteiz
21:30
		Boxscore		Arena: Buesa Arena

2 February 2027 26	Anadolu Efes (Turkish Basketball Federation)	vs.	(Lithuanian Basketball Federation) Žalgiris	Istanbul
19:30
		Boxscore		Arena: Basketball Development Center

4 February 2027 27	Žalgiris (Lithuanian Basketball Federation)	vs.	(Turkish Basketball Federation) Beşiktaş	Kaunas
20:00
		Boxscore		Arena: Žalgiris Arena

12 February 2027 28	Žalgiris (Lithuanian Basketball Federation)	vs.	(Spanish Basketball Federation) Real Madrid	Kaunas
20:00
		Boxscore		Arena: Žalgiris Arena

4 March 2027 29	Valencia Basket (Spanish Basketball Federation)	vs.	(Lithuanian Basketball Federation) Žalgiris	Valencia
21:30
		Boxscore		Arena: Roig Arena

9 March 2027 30	Žalgiris (Lithuanian Basketball Federation)	vs.	(Spanish Basketball Federation) Barcelona	Kaunas
20:00
		Boxscore		Arena: Žalgiris Arena

12 March 2027 31	Žalgiris (Lithuanian Basketball Federation)	vs.	(Italian Basketball Federation) Armani Olimpia Milan	Kaunas
20:00
		Boxscore		Arena: Žalgiris Arena

18 March 2027 32	Panathinaikos AKTOR (Hellenic Basketball Federation)	vs.	(Lithuanian Basketball Federation) Žalgiris	Marousi
21:15
		Boxscore		Arena: Telekom Center Athens

24 March 2027 33	Žalgiris (Lithuanian Basketball Federation)	vs.	(Israeli Basketball Association) Maccabi Rapyd Tel Aviv	Kaunas
20:00
		Boxscore		Arena: Žalgiris Arena

26 March 2027 34	Bayern Munich (German Basketball Federation)	vs.	(Lithuanian Basketball Federation) Žalgiris	Munich
21:30
		Boxscore		Arena: SAP Garden

31 March 2027 35	Žalgiris (Lithuanian Basketball Federation)	vs.	(Israeli Basketball Association) Hapoel IBI Tel Aviv	Kaunas
20:00
		Boxscore		Arena: Žalgiris Arena

7 April 2027 36	Dubai Basketball (United Arab Emirates Basketball Association)	vs.	(Lithuanian Basketball Federation) Žalgiris	Dubai
19:00
		Boxscore		Arena: Coca-Cola Arena

9 April 2027 37	Olympiacos (Hellenic Basketball Federation)	vs.	(Lithuanian Basketball Federation) Žalgiris	Piraeus
21:15
		Boxscore		Arena: Peace and Friendship Stadium

15 April 2027 38	Žalgiris (Lithuanian Basketball Federation)	vs.	(Turkish Basketball Federation) Fenerbahçe Tarfin	Kaunas
20:00
		Boxscore		Arena: Žalgirio Arena

== Statistics ==
=== LKL ===
Player	GP	GS	MPG	2FG%	3FG%	FT%	RPG	APG	SPG	BPG	PPG	PIR
Sterling Brown	10	1	18:15	50%	54.5%	66.7%	2.2	2	0.3	–	9.4	8.3
Nigel Williams-Goss	2	2	17:22	75%	–	100%	2.5	7	–	0.5	6.5	15
Kaodirichi Akobundu-Ehiogu	8	0	13:25	73.3%	–	50%	2.5	0.3	0.5	1.8	3.6	6.9
Carsen Edwards	8	6	18:00	44.4%	50%	80%	1.5	2.1	0.4	–	13.3	9.1
Saben Lee	7	4	14:57	50%	63.6%	90.9%	1.4	3.4	0.6	–	7.3	9.6
Dovydas Giedraitis	10	3	17:36	52.6%	35.7%	85.7%	1.6	2.1	0.3	–	5.6	5.2
Ąžuolas Tubelis	5	4	14:20	38.7%	50%	83.3%	3.6	0.8	0.4	0.4	8	8.8
Maodo Lô	10	2	13:18	50%	34.6%	50%	1.6	1.8	0.4	–	4.9	4.5
Dustin Sleva	10	7	18:18	58.6%	48.4%	84.2%	4.2	1.5	1	–	9.5	10.3
Jonas Valančiūnas	6	6	17:48	77.3%	–	72.7%	5.7	1.3	0.3	0.8	15.3	21.7
Marek Blaževič	10	5	16:56	75%	66.7%	67.9%	4.8	1.8	0.8	0.7	10.9	15.3
Keenan Evans	3	2	14:03	50%	16.7%	100%	2.7	3.7	0.7	–	3	7.3
Marius Grigonis	10	3	18:09	76.9%	55.9%	81.8%	2.2	2.4	0.8	–	9.5	11.2
Arnas Butkevičius	10	6	17:14	60%	20%	100%	3.5	1.6	1.1	0.2	3.4	7.5
Deividas Sirvydis	9	4	19:13	70.3%	32.1%	60%	2.4	1.7	0.8	–	9.4	9
Edgaras Ulanovas	11	0	19:37	58.3%	41.2%	74.4%	3.2	2	0.4	0.1	8.4	11.3
TOTAL				61%	44.4%	75%	36.6	22.6	6.8	2.9	95.4	116.7

Source: LKL

=== EuroLeague ===
Player	GP	GS	MPG	2FG%	3FG%	FT%	RPG	APG	SPG	BPG	PPG	PIR
Sterling Brown	13	1	18:30	61%	47.1%	83.3%	2.9	1.3	0.8	0.2	10.2	10.1
Nigel Williams-Goss	2	2	18:35	35.7%	33.3%	100%	1.5	4.5	1	–	7	5.5
Kaodirichi Akobundu-Ehiogu	3	0	6:17	66.7%	–	100%	2	–	–	0.7	2	2.7
Carsen Edwards	13	13	23:02	46%	38.4%	94.6%	1.3	2.8	1	–	16.5	12.3
Saben Lee	10	5	19:02	41.7%	16.7%	83.3%	1.5	3.5	0.4	0.1	5.6	5.5
Dovydas Giedraitis	5	2	7:45	20%	–	–	0.8	0.6	–	–	0.4	-0.6
Ąžuolas Tubelis	13	10	23:39	61.9%	26.3%	71.8%	6	1.5	0.6	0.6	12.5	16.7
Maodo Lô	7	0	13:17	20%	22.2%	100%	1.9	2.3	0.3	–	3	1.9
Dustin Sleva	13	3	18:00	44.8%	43.6%	40%	3.7	0.8	0.7	0.1	6.2	5.9
Jonas Valančiūnas	13	13	21:23	53.5%	50%	76.2%	8.8	1.8	0.3	1.1	12.5	19.9
Marek Blaževič	6	0	8:08	35.7%	–	75%	2.2	0.3	0.5	–	2.2	1.5
Keenan Evans	6	4	19:24	40%	30.8%	75%	2	3.8	0.2	–	5.7	6.3
Marius Grigonis	13	0	18:14	57.7%	46%	70.6%	2.2	1.8	0.4	0.1	8.5	8.9
Arnas Butkevičius	13	11	20:01	75%	20%	81.8%	3.9	0.9	0.7	0.2	3.9	5.7
Deividas Sirvydis	3	0	8:53	40%	100%	–	1	0.7	–	–	5.3	3.7
Edgaras Ulanovas	13	1	15:11	44.4%	50%	67.7%	2.1	1.1	0.2	0.1	4.2	5.5
TOTAL				51%	38.7%	77.1%	40.4	19	5.7	2.5	87	99.5

Source: EuroLeague
