= 2026–27 BC Rytas season =

BC Rytas
2026–27 season
- Manager: (Lithuanian Basketball Federation) Mantvydas Dabašinskas
- Head coach: (Lithuanian Basketball Federation) Nedas Pacevičius
- Arena: Active Vilnius Arena; Arena Vilnius
- LKL: Regular season
- Basketball Champions League: Regular season
- King Mindaugas Cup: Quarterfinals
- FIBA Intercontinental Cup: Runners–up
- Highest home attendance: LKL: 8,223; Rytas 89–94 Žalgiris (2 November 2026) Basketball Champions League: 5,267; Rytas 102–82 Nanterre 92 (11 November 2026)
- Lowest home attendance: LKL: 2,413; Rytas 96–79 Jonava Hipocredit (15 November 2026) Basketball Champions League: 4,055; Rytas 82–73 Sabah (6 October 2026)
- Average home attendance: LKL: 4,276; Basketball Champions League: 4,575
- Biggest win: Rytas 107–66 Shanghai Sharks (24 September 2026)
- Biggest defeat: Nanterre 92 93–65 Rytas (13 October 2026)
Home	Away

The 2026–27 season is Rytas's 54th (10th as Rytas) in the existence of the club.

Times up to 24 October 2026 and from 28 March 2027 are EEST (UTC+3). Times from 25 October 2026 to 27 March 2027 are EET (UTC+2).

== Players ==
=== Current roster ===
Note: Flags indicate national team eligibility at FIBA-sanctioned events. Players may hold other non-FIBA nationalities not displayed.

BC Rytas roster
Players
Coaches

Pos.	No.	Nat.	Name	Ht.	Wt.	Age
G	0	(United States)	Devoe, Michael	1.95 m (6 ft 5 in)	83 kg (183 lb)	26 – 17 December 1999
PG	3	(Lithuania)	Marčiulionis, Augustas	1.93 m (6 ft 4 in)	91 kg (201 lb)	24 – 21 March 2002
F	4	(United States) (Panama)	Lindo, Ricky	2.03 m (6 ft 8 in)	100 kg (220 lb)	26 – 26 September 2000
G	5	(United States)	Winston, Cassius	1.85 m (6 ft 1 in)	84 kg (185 lb)	28 – 28 February 1998
G/F	7	(Lithuania)	Radzevičius, Gytis	1.97 m (6 ft 6 in)	92 kg (203 lb)	31 – 17 July 1995
C	8	(Lithuania)	Gudaitis, Artūras (C)	2.08 m (6 ft 10 in)	115 kg (254 lb)	33 – 19 June 1993
F	9	(Germany)	Bruhnke, Kay	2.06 m (6 ft 9 in)	93 kg (205 lb)	25 – 15 July 2001
F/C	14	(Lithuania)	Pleikys, Oskaras	2.02 m (6 ft 8 in)	105 kg (231 lb)	25 – 20 March 2001
G/F	16	(Lithuania)	Urbonas, Ignas	1.99 m (6 ft 6 in)	93 kg (205 lb)	19 – 22 November 2007
F/C	21	(Lithuania)	Masiulis, Gytis	2.07 m (6 ft 9 in)	99 kg (218 lb)	28 – 10 April 1998
G/F	23	(Lithuania)	Jogėla, Matas	2.01 m (6 ft 7 in)	90 kg (198 lb)	28 – 10 July 1998
G/F	77	(Lithuania)	Paliukėnas, Martynas	1.95 m (6 ft 5 in)	94 kg (207 lb)	33 – 14 September 1993

Head coach

- (Lithuania) Nedas Pacevičius

Assistant coach(es)

- (Finland) Vesa Vertio
- (Lithuania) Mindaugas Brazys
- (Lithuania) Matas Juzeliūnas

Athletic trainer(s)

- (Lithuania) Tadas Jackūnas

Physiotherapist(s)

- (Lithuania) Andrius Misiūra
- (Lithuania) Konstantinas Medvedevas

Legend

- (C) Team captain
- Injured

- Roster
Updated: July 8, 2026

=== Depth chart ===
Pos.	Starting 5	Bench 1	Bench 2
C	Artūras Gudaitis	Gytis Masiulis	Oskaras Pleikys
PF	Ricky Lindo	Kay Bruhnke
SF	Gytis Radzevičius	Ignas Urbonas
SG	Michael Devoe	Matas Jogėla	Martynas Paliukėnas
PG	Cassius Winston	Augustas Marčiulionis

=== Squad changes for/during the 2026–27 season ===
==== In ====
No.	Pos.	Nat.	Name	Moving from		Ends
—	HC	(Lithuania)	Nedas Pacevičius	Assistant coach		
—	F	(Lithuania)	Gytis Nemeikša	Hawaii	(United States)	
0	G	(United States)	Michael Devoe	Türk Telekom	(Turkey)	
4	F	(United States) (Panama)	Ricky Lindo	JL Bourg	(France)	
5	G	(United States)	Cassius Winston	Hapoel Jerusalem	(Israel)	
7	G/F	(Lithuania)	Gytis Radzevičius	Baskonia	(Spain)	
14	F/C	(Lithuania)	Oskaras Pleikys	Šiauliai	(Lithuania)	
23	G/F	(Lithuania)	Matas Jogėla	Dolomiti Energia Trento	(Italy)	

==== Out ====
No.	Pos.	Nat.	Name	Moving to	
—	HC	(Lithuania)	Giedrius Žibėnas	Free agent	
10	G	(United States)	Jerrick Harding	Türk Telekom	(Turkey)
14	C	(Lithuania)	Martynas Echodas	Neptūnas Klaipėda	(Lithuania)
19	G	(Lithuania)	Nikas Stuknys	UT Martin	(United States)
22	G/F	(Lithuania)	Gantas Križanauskas	Portland State	(United States)
24	F	(United States)	Jordan Caroline	TSG GhostHawks	(Taiwan)
41	G/F	(Lithuania) (Germany)	Simonas Lukošius	Dubai Basketball	(United Arab Emirates)
43	G/F	(Lithuania)	Ignas Sargiūnas	Fenerbahçe	(Turkey)
44	PG	(United States)	Speedy Smith	Pallacanestro Reggiana	(Italy)

==== Loaned Out ====
No.	Pos.	Nat.	Name	Moving to	
	F	(Lithuania)	Gytis Nemeikša	Lietkabelis Panevėžys	(Lithuania)

== Pre-season and friendlies ==
=== Friendly matches ===
4 September 2026	Lietkabelis (Lithuanian Basketball Federation)	84–103	(Lithuanian Basketball Federation) Rytas	Druskininkai
13:00	Scoring by quarter: 21–27, 25–17, 21–38, 17–21
	Pts: Kennedy, Schumacher 14; Rebs: Four players 3 Asts: Radžius 5 PIR: Kennedy 13	Boxscore	Pts: Bruhnke 22; Rebs: Gudaitis, Urbonas 6 Asts: Winston 9 PIR: Winston 23	Referees: Ignas Jablonskas, Melita Stalončiskaitė

8 September 2026	VEF Rīga (Latvian Basketball Association)	78–86	(Lithuanian Basketball Federation) Rytas	Riga
13:00	Scoring by quarter: 22–18, 23–19, 23–21, 10–28
	Pts: Sears 17; Rebs: Kelly 9 Asts: Sears 8 PIR: Mejeris 20	Boxscore	Pts: Devoe 17; Rebs: Devoe 11; Asts: Devoe 9 PIR: Devoe 26	Attendance: 30

12 September 2026 Satchel Cup	Rytas (Lithuanian Basketball Federation)	104–87	(Turkish Basketball Federation) Safiport Erokspor	Vilnius
19:30	Scoring by quarter: 29–19, 21–19, 25–19, 29–30
	Pts: Winston 23; Rebs: Bruhnke, Radzevičius 7 Asts: Radzevičius, Winston 6 PIR: Winston 30	Boxscore	Pts: Sow 19	Arena: Active Vilnius Arena

13 September 2026 Satchel Cup	Rytas (Lithuanian Basketball Federation)	104–95	(Israeli Basketball Association) Hapoel Tel Aviv	Vilnius
19:30
	Pts: Jogėla, Radzevičius 17; Rebs: Gudaitis, Masiulis 6 Asts: Devoe 7 PIR: Devoe 22	Boxscore		Arena: Active Vilnius Arena

== Competitions ==
=== Overview ===
Competition	First match	Last match	Starting round	Final position	Record							
Competition	First match	Last match	Starting round	Final position	Pld	W	D	L	PF	PA	PD	Win %
LKL	3 October 2026		Regular season		11	7		4	997	949	+48	63.64
Basketball Champions League	6 October 2026		Regular season		4	3		1	346	329	+17	75.00
King Mindaugas Cup	TBA		Quarterfinals		0	0		0	0	0	+0	—
FIBA Intercontinental Cup	22 September 2026	27 September 2026	Group stage	Runners–up	4	3		1	377	314	+63	75.00
Total					19	13	0	6	1,720	1,592	+128	68.42

Last updated: 22 November 2026
Source: Competitions

=== LKL ===
==== League table ====
Pos	Team	Pld	W	L	PF	PA	PD	Qualification or relegation
1	Žalgiris	11	11	0	1049	861	+188	Advance to playoffs
2	Gargždai	11	7	4	986	964	+22	Advance to playoffs
3	Rytas	11	7	4	997	949	+48	Advance to playoffs
4	Lietkabelis	11	6	5	891	926	−35	Advance to playoffs
5	Neptūnas	11	6	5	954	931	+23	Advance to playoffs

Updated to match(es) played on 22 November 2026. Source: LKL.lt

==== Results summary ====
Overall						Home					Away				
Pld	W	L	PF	PA	PD	W	L	PF	PA	PD	W	L	PF	PA	PD
11	7	4	997	949	+48	3	2	460	439	+21	4	2	537	510	+27

Source: Competitive matches

==== Results by round ====
Round	1	2	3	4	5	6	7	8	9	10	11	12	13	14	15	16	17	18	19	20	21	22	23	24	25	26	27	28	29	30	31	32	33	34	35	36
Ground	H	H	A	A	A	H	H	A	A	A	H	A	H	A	H	A	H	H	H	H	A	A	H	A	A	H	H	H	A	A	H	H	A	A	A	H
Result	L	W	W	W	W	L	W	L	W	L	W																									
Position	9	7	4	3	3	3	2	3	2	4	3																									

Source: Competitive matches
A = Away; H = Home; W = Win; L = Loss; R = Rest

==== Matches ====
3 October 2026 1	Rytas	102–105	Gargždai	Vilnius
16:50	Scoring by quarter: 25–31, 23–20, 32–27, 22–27
	Pts: Three players 20; Rebs: Radzevičius 6 Asts: Bruhnke 5 PIR: Gudaitis 25	Boxscore	Pts: Carlos 31; Rebs: Mikalauskas 7 Asts: Carlos 9 PIR: Carlos 36	Arena: Arena Vilnius; Attendance: 3,012; Referees: Saulius Račys, Dovydas Kairys, Milita Stalaučinskaitė

10 October 2026 2	Rytas	86–77	Neptūnas	Vilnius
16:50	Scoring by quarter: 18–22, 22–18, 27–21, 19–16
	Pts: Marčiulionis 17; Rebs: Gudaitis, Marčiulionis 6 Asts: Devoe 5 PIR: Devoe 20	Boxscore	Pts: Echodas, Franke 16; Rebs: Echodas, Tubutis 8 Asts: Friðriksson, Žemaitis 3 PIR: Echodas, Franke 18	Arena: Arena Vilnius; Attendance: 3,455; Referees: Gytis Vilius, Andžej Urbanovič, Ignas Jablonskas

17 October 2026 3	Šiauliai	88–95	Rytas	Šiauliai
16:50	Scoring by quarter: 27–21, 15–27, 24–28, 22–19
	Pts: Jarumbauskas 18; Rebs: Pacevičius 7 Asts: Fofana 7 PIR: Fofana 20	Boxscore	Pts: Devoe 18; Rebs: Devoe, Masiulis 5 Asts: Jogėla, Winston 4 PIR: Devoe 25	Arena: Šiauliai Arena; Attendance: 2,723; Referees: Juozas Barkauskas, Gintaras Mačiulis, Gabrielius Simonavičius

21 October 2026 4	Tauragė	71–79	Rytas	Tauragė
18:00	Scoring by quarter: 24–21, 17–12, 16–24, 14–22
	Pts: Griciūnas 15; Rebs: Griciūnas 10; Asts: Hayes, Kariniauskas 5 PIR: Griciūnas 19	Boxscore	Pts: Gudaitis, Lindo 13; Rebs: Lindo 9 Asts: Winston 8 PIR: Gudaitis 19	Arena: Tauragė Arena; Attendance: 1,800; Referees: Jurgis Laurinavičius, Darius Šomka, Ignas Kutka

25 October 2026 5	Juventus	76–94	Rytas	Utena
16:50	Scoring by quarter: 25–30, 17–21, 10–20, 24–23
	Pts: Beliauskas, Nzekwesi 18; Rebs: Pohto 7 Asts: Beliauskas, Hunter 3 PIR: Beliauskas 20	Boxscore	Pts: Gudaitis 18; Rebs: Masiulis 7 Asts: Devoe, Winston 5 PIR: Gudaitis 27	Arena: Utena Arena; Attendance: 2,244; Referees: Artūras Šukys, Gintaras Mačiulis, Deividas Mačiulskis

2 November 2026 6	Rytas	89–94	Žalgiris	Vilnius
16:50	Scoring by quarter: 21–25, 28–17, 20–28, 20–24
	Pts: Marčiulionis 24; Rebs: Radzevičius 7 Asts: Devoe 6 PIR: Marčiulionis 27	Boxscore	Pts: Sleva 24; Rebs: Sleva 9 Asts: Giedraitis 4 PIR: Sleva 31	Arena: Arena Vilnius; Attendance: 8,223; Referees: Gytis Vilius, Artūras Šukys, Gvidas Gedvilas

5 November 2026 7	Jonava Hipocredit	87–91	Rytas	Jonava
19:00	Scoring by quarter: 22–27, 22–22, 22–12, 21–30
	Pts: Johnson 24; Rebs: Lambrecht 5 Asts: Sabeckis 10; PIR: Johnson 23	Boxscore	Pts: Devoe 23; Rebs: Radzevičius 7 Asts: Winston 7 PIR: Devoe 26	Arena: Jonava Arena; Attendance: 941; Referees: Juozas Barkauskas, Vidmantas Rušinas, Tomas Stankevičius

7 November 2026 8	Lietkabelis	85–81	Rytas	Panevėžys
16:50	Scoring by quarter: 20–21, 22–25, 23–14, 20–21
	Pts: Kennedy, Schumacher 19; Rebs: Schumacher 6 Asts: Four players 2 PIR: Kennedy 22	Boxscore	Pts: Devoe 15; Rebs: Devoe 6 Asts: Devoe 4 PIR: Devoe 22	Arena: Kalnapilio Arena; Attendance: 2,136; Referees: Gytis Vilius, Andžej Urbanovič, Aurimas Borusas

15 November 2026 9	Rytas	96–79	Jonava Hipocredit	Vilnius
19:10	Scoring by quarter: 27–21, 25–25, 22–11, 22–22
	Pts: Marčiulionis 20; Rebs: Lindo 6 Asts: Marčiulionis 6 PIR: Marčiulionis 33	Boxscore	Pts: Johnson 21; Rebs: Sabeckis 6 Asts: Harrison, Johnson 3 PIR: Sabeckis 16	Arena: Arena Vilnius; Attendance: 2,413; Referees: Gvidas Gedvilas, Gabrielius Simonavičius, Ignas Kutka

18 November 2026 10	Nevėžis-Paskolų klubas	103–97	Rytas	Kėdainiai
18:50	Scoring by quarter: 23–29, 28–23, 20–14, 32–31
	Pts: Andrews 25; Rebs: Kancleris 7 Asts: Boardman-Raffet 6 PIR: Gray 25	Boxscore	Pts: Masiulis 17; Rebs: Radzevičius 8 Asts: Winston 6 PIR: Masiulis 22	Arena: Kėdainiai Arena; Attendance: 1,100; Referees: Gvidas Gedvilas, Darius Šomka, Eimantas Vasiliauskas

22 November 2026 11	Rytas	87–84	Juventus	Vilnius
19:10	Scoring by quarter: 24–16, 21–27, 23–22, 19–19
	Pts: Marčiulionis 17; Rebs: Lindo 8 Asts: Devoe, Winston 4 PIR: Bruhnke 21	Boxscore	Pts: Beliauskas 20; Rebs: Nzekwesi 6 Asts: Pagenkopf 5 PIR: Beliauskas, Nzekwesi 15	Arena: Arena Vilnius; Attendance: 3,027; Referees: Juozas Barkauskas, Aurimas Borusas, Milita Stalaučinskaitė

6 December 2026 12	Žalgiris	vs.	Rytas	Kaunas
16:50
		Boxscore		Arena: Žalgiris Arena

12 December 2026 13	Rytas	vs.	Šiauliai	Vilnius
19:10
		Boxscore		Arena: Arena Vilnius

19 December 2026 14	Gargždai	vs.	Rytas	Gargždai
16:30
		Boxscore		Arena: Gargždų Arena

27 December 2026 15	Rytas	vs.	Lietkabelis	Vilnius
16:50
		Boxscore		Arena: Arena Vilnius

16 January 2027 16	Neptūnas	vs.	Rytas	Klaipėda
16:50
		Boxscore		Arena: Švyturys Arena

24 January 2027 17	Rytas	vs.	Nevėžis-Paskolų klubas	Vilnius
19:10
		Boxscore		Arena: Arena Vilnius

30 January 2027 18	Rytas	vs.	Tauragė	Vilnius
19:10
		Boxscore		Arena: Arena Vilnius

7 February 2027 19	Rytas	vs.	Juventus	Vilnius
19:10
		Boxscore		Arena: Arena Vilnius

14 February 2027 20	Rytas	vs.	Šiauliai	Vilnius
16:50
		Boxscore		Arena: Arena Vilnius

16 February 2027 21	Nevėžis-Paskolų klubas	vs.	Rytas	Kėdainiai
19:10
		Boxscore		Arena: Kėdainiai Arena

6 March 2027 22	Gargždai	vs.	Rytas	Gargždai
16:50
		Boxscore		Arena: Gargždų Arena

13 March 2027 23	Rytas	vs.	Tauragė	Vilnius
16:50
		Boxscore		Arena: Arena Vilnius

21 March 2027 24	Žalgiris	vs.	Rytas	Kaunas
16:50
		Boxscore		Arena: Žalgiris Arena

29 March 2027 25	Lietkabelis	vs.	Rytas	Panevėžys
19:10
		Boxscore		Arena: Kalnapilio Arena

3 April 2027 26	Rytas	vs.	Jonava Hipocredit	Vilnius
16:00
		Boxscore		Arena: Arena Vilnius

11 April 2027 27	Rytas	vs.	Neptūnas	Vilnius
16:50
		Boxscore		Arena: Arena Vilnius

18 April 2027 28	Rytas	vs.	Žalgiris	Vilnius
16:50
		Boxscore		Arena: Arena Vilnius

21 April 2027 29	Jonava Hipocredit	vs.	Rytas	Jonava
18:50
		Boxscore		Arena: Jonava Arena

24 April 2027 30	Juventus	vs.	Rytas	Utena
16:50
		Boxscore		Arena: Utena Arena

28 April 2027 31	Rytas	vs.	Gargždai	Vilnius
19:00
		Boxscore		Arena: Arena Vilnius

1 May 2027 32	Rytas	vs.	Nevėžis-Paskolų klubas	Vilnius
16:00
		Boxscore		Arena: Arena Vilnius

5 May 2027 33	Neptūnas	vs.	Rytas	Klaipėda
18:50
		Boxscore		Arena: Švyturys Arena

10 May 2027 34	Šiauliai	vs.	Rytas	Šiauliai
18:50
		Boxscore		Arena: Šiauliai Arena

12 May 2027 35	Tauragė	vs.	Rytas	Tauragė
18:00
		Boxscore		Arena: Tauragė Arena

16 May 2027 36	Rytas	vs.	Lietkabelis	Vilnius
16:50
		Boxscore		Arena: Arena Vilnius

=== Basketball Champions League ===
==== Regular season ====
===== Group A =====
Pos	Team	Pld	W	L	PF	PA	PD	Pts	Qualification
1	(Lithuanian Basketball Federation) Rytas	4	3	1	346	329	+17	7	Advance to round of 16
2	(Azerbaijan Basketball Federation) Sabah	4	2	2	334	334	0	6	Advance to play-ins
3	(Turkish Basketball Federation) Trabzonspor	4	2	2	346	354	−8	6	Advance to play-ins
4	(French Federation of Basketball) Nanterre 92	4	1	3	338	347	−9	5	

Updated to match(es) played on November 11, 2026. Source: FIBA

==== Regular season matches ====
6 October 2026 1	Rytas (Lithuanian Basketball Federation)	82–73	(Azerbaijan Basketball Federation) Sabah	Arena Vilnius
19:30	Scoring by quarter: 16–20, 23–18, 22–19, 21–16
	Pts: Marčiulionis 22; Rebs: Radzevičius 12; Asts: Winston 4 PIR: Radzevičius 30	Boxscore	Pts: Fidler 19; Rebs: Perkins 11; Asts: Blakes 6 PIR: Fidler, Perkins 21	Attendance: 4,055; Referees: Ariadna Chueca, Ventsislav Velikov, Zdenko Tomasovic

13 October 2026 2	Nanterre 92 (French Federation of Basketball)	93–65	(Lithuanian Basketball Federation) Rytas	Palais des Sports Maurice Thorez
21:00	Scoring by quarter: 21–17, 14–13, 31–15, 27–20
	Pts: Castañeda, Roberts 15; Rebs: Roberts 12; Asts: Castañeda 9 PIR: Roberts 23	Boxscore	Pts: Gudaitis 10; Rebs: Gudaitis 13; Asts: Winston 7 PIR: Gudaitis 17	Referees: Castillo, Paulo Marques, Andris Aunkrogers

28 October 2026 3	Rytas (Lithuanian Basketball Federation)	97–81	(Turkish Basketball Federation) Trabzonspor	Arena Vilnius
19:30	Scoring by quarter: 25–22, 21–7, 26–28, 25–24
	Pts: Gudaitis 21; Rebs: Radzevičius 6 Asts: Winston 7 PIR: Radzevičius 21	Boxscore	Pts: Caupain 18; Rebs: Arslan 7 Asts: Keene 6 PIR: Terry 15	Attendance: 4,403; Referees: Julio Anaya, Martin Vulić, Ritvars Helmšteins

11 November 2026 4	Rytas (Lithuanian Basketball Federation)	102–82	(French Federation of Basketball) Nanterre 92	Arena Vilnius
19:30	Scoring by quarter: 32–16, 20–20, 22–25, 28–21
	Pts: Radzevičius 20; Rebs: Radzevičius 8 Asts: Jogėla 5 PIR: Radzevičius 27	Boxscore	Pts: Castañeda 18; Rebs: Saxen 7 Asts: Castañeda 5 PIR: Sene 18	Attendance: 5,267; Referees: Mihkel Männiste, Boris Krejić, Yener Yılmaz

9 December 2026 5	Trabzonspor (Turkish Basketball Federation)	vs.	(Lithuanian Basketball Federation) Rytas	Hayri Gür Arena
19:00
		Boxscore

22 December 2026 6	Sabah (Azerbaijan Basketball Federation)	vs.	(Lithuanian Basketball Federation) Rytas	National Gymnastics Arena
19:00
		Boxscore

=== FIBA Intercontinental Cup ===
==== Group stage ====
===== Group A =====
Pos	Team	Pld	W	L	PF	PA	PD	Pts	Qualification
1	(Lithuanian Basketball Federation) Rytas	2	2	0	214	155	+59	4	Advance to semifinals
2	(Rwanda Basketball Federation) RSSB Tigers	2	1	1	206	222	−16	3	Advance to semifinals
3	(Chinese Basketball Association (organisation)) Shanghai Sharks	2	0	2	181	224	−43	2	Qualification to fifth place game

Source: FIBA

==== Group stage matches ====
22 September 2026 1	Rytas (Lithuanian Basketball Federation)	107–89	(Rwanda Basketball Federation) RSSB Tigers	National Indoor Stadium
10:30	Scoring by quarter: 21–19, 26–20, 31–20, 29–30
	Pts: Bruhnke 22; Rebs: Bruhnke, Lindo 9 Asts: Devoe 8 PIR: Bruhnke 24	Boxscore	Pts: Randall 20; Rebs: Galloway 8 Asts: Jackson 6 PIR: Lenard 17	Referees: Ariadna Chueca, Ruben Woolcock, Sun Jian

24 September 2026 2	Rytas (Lithuanian Basketball Federation)	107–66	(Chinese Basketball Association (organisation)) Shanghai Sharks	National Indoor Stadium
10:30	Scoring by quarter: 25–24, 30–20, 27–7, 25–15
	Pts: Masiulis 17; Rebs: Gudaitis 13; Asts: Winston 6 PIR: Bruhnke 21	Boxscore	Pts: Wang Z.L. 14; Rebs: Cui X.L. 6 Asts: Yuan T.W. 7 PIR: Wang Z.L. 17	Referees: Takaki Kato, Alan dos Santos, Petar Pešić

==== Final round ====
26 September 2026 Semifinals	Rytas (Lithuanian Basketball Federation)	77–70	(Argentine Basketball Confederation) Boca Juniors	National Indoor Stadium
14:30	Scoring by quarter: 11–16, 22–24, 17–18, 27–12
	Pts: Devoe, Marčiulionis 14; Rebs: Masiulis 8 Asts: Devoe, Marčiulionis 4 PIR: Marčiulionis 13	Boxscore	Pts: Warren 16; Rebs: Cáffaro 8 Asts: Warren, Vildoza 3 PIR: Lema, Warren 16	Referees: Julio Anaya, Ariadna Chueca, Alan dos Santos

27 September 2026 Final	Rytas (Lithuanian Basketball Federation)	86–89	(USA Basketball) NBA G League United	National Indoor Stadium
13:30	Scoring by quarter: 18–24, 28–18, 9–26, 31–21
	Pts: Bruhnke, Jogėla 15; Rebs: Bruhnke 9 Asts: Marčiulionis 9 PIR: Bruhnke 20	Boxscore	Pts: East 19; Rebs: Wheeler 8 Asts: East 3 PIR: East 18	Referees: Julio Anaya, Ariadna Chueca, Alan dos Santos

== Statistics ==
=== LKL ===
Player	GP	GS	MPG	2FG%	3FG%	FT%	RPG	APG	SPG	BPG	PPG	PIR
Michael Devoe	10	6	23:20	67.4%	47.2%	43.8%	3.8	4	0.9	0.1	11.6	14.8
Cassius Winston	8	8	22:54	65.9%	45.5%	76.2%	2	5	0.8	–	12.5	13.3
Augustas Marčiulionis	10	1	21:04	64.3%	30%	82.4%	2.8	3.1	0.7	0.2	13.6	14.9
Ricky Lindo	10	8	20:25	66.7%	44.4%	60%	3.6	0.6	0.6	0.4	6.9	6.9
Gytis Radzevičius	10	10	27:31	60.5%	28.9%	71.9%	5.7	2.1	0.7	0.1	10.2	14.9
Artūras Gudaitis	8	8	21:46	71.4%	–	60%	4.1	1	0.4	1	13.8	16
Kay Bruhnke	8	2	21:36	57.9%	44.4%	66.7%	2.5	1.1	0.6	0.4	9	7.4
Kornelijus Snitka	2	0	3:15	–	–	–	–	–	–	–	–	-2
Oskaras Pleikys	8	2	11:56	72.7%	–	75%	2.4	0.4	0.4	0.3	3.1	4.6
Ignas Urbonas	4	0	7:19	50%	33.3%	100%	1.3	–	–	–	1.8	1.5
Gytis Masiulis	10	0	17:00	51.4%	37.9%	68.8%	4.6	0.8	0.4	0.9	9.1	11.1
Matt Thomas	1	0	13:44	–	20%	–	2	–	–	–	3	1
Matas Jogėla	9	1	18:21	80%	25%	80%	2.6	2.4	0.3	0.2	5.9	6
Martynas Paliukėnas	5	4	13:08	33.3%	46.7%	50%	1	1.4	–	–	5.2	2.6
TOTAL				64.1%	36.5%	68.4%	37.1	19.5	5.3	3.2	91	106.2

Source: LKL

=== Basketball Champions League ===
Player	GP	MPG	2FG%	3FG%	FT%	RPG	APG	SPG	BPG	PPG	PIR
Michael Devoe	4	23:18	64.3%	22.2%	54.5%	1.5	1.5	–	0.3	7.5	5
Cassius Winston	4	21:00	36.4%	28.6%	100%	0.8	4.8	0.5	–	7.5	6
Augustas Marčiulionis	4	23:12	57.9%	43.8%	72.7%	2.5	3	0.5	0.3	14.8	13
Ricky Lindo	4	19:48	60%	18.2%	66.7%	3.5	1	0.5	0.3	3.5	5.3
Gytis Radzevičius	4	30:06	65%	55.6%	77.8%	8	2.3	0.8	–	15.8	21.5
Artūras Gudaitis	4	23:48	66.7%	–	58.1%	7.8	0.8	0.3	0.8	13.5	16.3
Kay Bruhnke	4	20:30	72.7%	35.7%	75%	2.5	0.8	–	0.5	8.5	8
Oskaras Pleikys	3	5:54	–	–	87.5%	2	0.7	–	–	2.3	4
Ignas Urbonas	3	4:36	75%	00%	–	1.7	–	–	–	3	4
Gytis Masiulis	3	16:12	45.5%	50%	85.7%	2.7	1.3	0.3	0.3	8.3	9.7
Matas Jogėla	3	18:06	40%	50%	100%	2	1.7	–	–	7	6.7
Martynas Paliukėnas	2	9:06	–	–	–	–	0.5	–	–	–	-1
TOTAL			57.6%	38.9%	71.4%	38.8	17	2.8	2.3	86.5	92.8

Source: Basketball Champions League
