= Bratanovic =

Bratanovic is a surname. Notable people with the surname include:

- Elvis Bratanović (born 1992), Slovenian football player
- Haris Bratanovic (born 2001), Belgian basketball player
