= 2026–27 LKL season =

34th season of the top-tier level professional basketball league of Lithuania

Betsson-LKL
- Season: 2026–27
- Duration: 17 September 2026 – 16 May 2027 (Regular season)
- Teams: 10

Statistical leaders
Points	(United States) Nick Johnson	20.7
Rebounds	(Lithuania) Martynas Echodas	6.6
Assists	(United States) Jaquan Carlos	7.8
Index Rating	(Lithuania) Jonas Valančiūnas	22.4

Records
- Biggest home win: Žalgiris 97–68 Lietkabelis (4 October 2026)
- Biggest away win: Lietkabelis 94–123 Žalgiris (22 November 2026)
- Highest scoring: Lietkabelis 94–123 Žalgiris (22 November 2026)
- Winning streak: 11 games Žalgiris
- Losing streak: 6 games Nevėžis-Paskolų klubas
- Highest attendance: 8,223; Rytas 89–94 Žalgiris (2 November 2026)
- Lowest attendance: 664; Nevėžis-Paskolų klubas 87–76 Gargždai (2 November 2026)

Seasons
- ← 2025–26 2027–28 →

The 2026–27 Lietuvos krepšinio lyga season, also called Betsson–LKL for sponsorship reasons, is 34th season of the top-tier level professional basketball league of Lithuania, the Lietuvos krepšinio lyga (LKL). Žalgiris are the defending champions.

== Teams ==
10 teams will participate in 2026–27 season. On 30 April 2026, league's license was granted to Tauragė team.

Location of teams in 2026–27 LKL

Team	Location	Arena	Capacity	Last season
Gargždai	Gargždai	Gargždų Arena	1,400	7th
Jonava Hipocredit	Jonava	Jonava Arena	2,200	8th
Juventus	Utena	Utena Arena	2,500	2nd place, silver medalist(s)
Lietkabelis	Panevėžys	Kalnapilio Arena	5,950	4th
Neptūnas	Klaipėda	Švyturys Arena	6,200	3rd place, bronze medalist(s)
Nevėžis-Paskolų klubas	Kėdainiai	Kėdainiai Arena	2,200	9th
Rytas	Vilnius	Arena Vilnius	10,000	5th
Rytas	Vilnius	Active Vilnius Arena	2,500	5th
Šiauliai	Šiauliai	Šiauliai Arena	5,700	6th
Tauragė	Tauragė	Tauragė Arena	1,800	—
Žalgiris	Kaunas	Žalgiris Arena	15,415	1st place, gold medalist(s)

=== Personnel and kits ===
Team	Head coach	Captain	Kit manufacturer	Shirt sponsor (chest)
Gargždai	(Lithuanian Basketball Federation) Paulius Malašauskas	(Lithuania) Evaldas Šaulys	Hustle Point	7bet
Jonava Hipocredit	(Lithuanian Basketball Federation) Steponas Babrauskas	(Lithuania) Donatas Sabeckis	AGO	Dafta, Rizgonys, Jonava, Hipocredit, Casino Admiral
Juventus	(Lithuanian Basketball Federation) Laimonas Eglinskas	(Lithuania) Šarūnas Beniušis	Hustle Point	Umaras, Norfa, Utenos mėsa, Uniclub Casino
Lietkabelis	(Basketball Federation of Serbia) Nenad Čanak	(Lithuania) Gabrielius Maldūnas	AGO	Norfa, 7bet
Neptūnas	(Lithuanian Basketball Federation) Gediminas Petrauskas	(Lithuania) Mindaugas Girdžiūnas	Nike	Klaipėdos miesto savivaldybė, 7bet, Klaipėdos konteinerių terminalas (KKT), Amberton Hotel Group
Nevėžis–Paskolų klubas	(Lithuanian Basketball Federation) Evaldas Beržininkaitis	(Lithuania) Paulius Petrilevičius	AGO	Optibet, Autotoja, Paskolų klubas
Rytas	(Lithuanian Basketball Federation) Nedas Pacevičius	(Lithuania) Artūras Gudaitis	AGO	Olybet, Utenos nealkoholinis, Norfa
Šiauliai	(Lithuanian Basketball Federation) Darius Songaila	(Lithuania) Martynas Pacevičius	AGO	Šiaulių miesto savivaldybė, Norfa, Casino Admiral
Tauragė	(Lithuanian Basketball Federation) Tomas Rinkevičius	(Lithuania) Vaidas Kariniauskas	Hustle Point	7bet
Žalgiris	(Lithuanian Basketball Federation) Tomas Masiulis	(Lithuania) Edgaras Ulanovas	Puma	Topsport, PayPal, Volkswagen, Go3

=== Managerial changes ===
Team	Outgoing manager	Manner of departure	Date of vacancy	Position in table	Replaced with	Date of appointment
Nevėžis-Paskolų klubas	(Lithuanian Basketball Federation) Matas Juzeliūnas (interim)	End of caretaker spell	17 May 2026	Pre-season	(Lithuanian Basketball Federation) Evaldas Beržininkaitis	22 June 2026
Tauragė	(Lithuanian Basketball Federation) Kęstutis Naruševičius	End of contract	23 June 2026	Pre-season	(Lithuanian Basketball Federation) Tomas Rinkevičius	23 June 2026
Gargždai	(Lithuanian Basketball Federation) Tomas Rinkevičius	Terminated the contract	22 June 2026	Pre-season	(Lithuanian Basketball Federation) Paulius Malašauskas	24 June 2026
Rytas	(Lithuanian Basketball Federation) Giedrius Žibėnas	Fired	25 May 2026	Pre-season	(Lithuanian Basketball Federation) Nedas Pacevičius	24 June 2026

== Regular season ==
=== League table ===
Pos	Team	Pld	W	L	PF	PA	PD	Qualification or relegation
1	Žalgiris	11	11	0	1049	861	+188	Advance to playoffs
2	Gargždai	11	7	4	986	964	+22	Advance to playoffs
3	Rytas	11	7	4	997	949	+48	Advance to playoffs
4	Lietkabelis	11	6	5	891	926	−35	Advance to playoffs
5	Neptūnas	11	6	5	954	931	+23	Advance to playoffs
6	Šiauliai	11	5	6	927	938	−11	Advance to playoffs
7	Nevėžis-Paskolų klubas	11	4	7	867	926	−59	Advance to playoffs
8	Jonava Hipocredit	11	3	8	867	939	−72	Advance to playoffs
9	Juventus	11	3	8	939	970	−31	
10	Tauragė	11	3	8	895	968	−73	

Updated to match(es) played on 22 November 2026. Source: LKL.lt

=== Results ===
Home \ Away	GAR	JON	JUV	LIE	NEP	NEV	RYT	SIA	TAU	ZAL
Gargždai	—	13 Dec	27 Dec	83–80	87–78	6 Dec	19 Dec	90–79	103–91	77–98
Gargždai	—	13 Mar	15 May	25 Apr	6 Feb	8 May	6 Mar	22 Apr	17 Apr	11 Apr
Jonava Hipocredit	70–91	—	94–82	19 Dec	83–84	85–65	87–91	63–79	5 Dec	26 Dec
Jonava Hipocredit	11 May	—	4 Mar	10 Apr	8 May	27 Mar	21 Apr	6 Feb	1 May	28 Apr
Juventus	100–90	16 Jan	—	5 Dec	12 Dec	94–77	76–94	19 Dec	93–77	85–94
Juventus	27 Mar	17 Apr	—	1 May	13 Feb	20 Mar	24 Apr	6 May	16 Feb	9 May
Lietkabelis	17 Jan	65–71	84–82	—	99–79	13 Dec	85–81	31 Jan	85–79	94–123
Lietkabelis	13 Feb	4 May	14 Mar	—	21 Apr	27 Apr	29 Mar	18 Apr	3 Apr	7 Mar
Neptūnas	31 Jan	105–82	99–84	23 Jan	—	89–62	16 Jan	110–88	82–80	69–93
Neptūnas	2 May	21 Mar	12 May	17 Feb	—	17 Apr	5 May	3 Apr	27 Mar	14 Mar
Nevėžis-Paskolų klubas	87–76	30 Jan	91–88	72–73	27 Dec	—	103–97	76–83	17 Jan	76–80
Nevėžis-Paskolų klubas	4 Apr	24 Apr	20 Apr	7 Feb	6 Mar	—	16 Feb	13 May	4 May	14 Feb
Rytas	102–105	96–79	87–84	27 Dec	86–77	24 Jan	—	12 Dec	30 Jan	89–94
Rytas	28 Apr	3 Apr	7 Feb	16 May	11 Apr	1 May	—	14 Feb	13 Mar	18 Apr
Šiauliai	97–82	24 Jan	83–71	86–77	5 Dec	81–82	17 Oct	—	81–91	17 Jan
Šiauliai	17 Feb	16 May	10 Apr	21 Mar	29 Apr	13 Mar	10 May	—	25 Apr	2 May
Tauragė	82–102	95–90	23 Jan	73–81	20 Dec	80–76	71–79	26 Dec	—	12 Dec
Tauragė	20 Mar	13 Feb	28 Apr	9 May	15 May	11 Apr	12 May	7 May	—	22 Apr
Žalgiris	24 Jan	86–63	31 Jan	97–68	87–82	20 Dec	6 Dec	101–82	96–76	—
Žalgiris	5 May	17 Feb	4 Apr	12 May	25 Apr	16 May	21 Mar	29 Mar	7 Feb	—

Updated to match(es) played on 22 November 2026. Source: LKL.lt
Legend: Blue = home team win; Red = away team win.
Matches with lighter background shading were decided after overtime.

== Attendances to arenas ==
=== Average attendances ===
Pos	Team	Total	High	Low	Average	Change
1	Žalgiris	21,939	6,746	2,750	4,387	−7.9%
2	Rytas	17,103	8,223	2,413	4,275	+53.4%
3	Neptūnas	11,642	4,698	1,552	2,328	−0.3%
4	Šiauliai	9,959	2,723	1,574	1,991	−20.2%
5	Juventus	9,500	2,968	1,372	1,900	+15.8%
6	Tauragė	9,160	2,020	1,780	1,832	n/a^{1}
7	Gargždai	5,598	1,500	1,169	1,399	+7.1%
8	Lietkabelis	6,857	2,136	1,009	1,371	−29.7%
9	Nevėžis-Paskolų klubas	6,042	1,600	664	1,007	−24.5%
10	Jonava Hipocredit	4,767	941	712	794	−16.2%
	League total	102,567	8,223	664	2,051	−8.1%

Source: LKL.lt
Notes:
1: Team will make its debut.

== Statistics ==
As of 15 November 2026

Source: LKL.lt

=== Performance Index Rating ===
Rank	Player	Club	Games	Rating	PIR
1.	(Lithuania) Jonas Valančiūnas	Žalgiris	5	112	22.4
2.	(United States) Nick Johnson	Jonava Hipocredit	10	223	22.3
3.	(United States) Jaquan Carlos	Gargždai	10	219	21.9
4.	(Iceland) Elvar Már Friðriksson	Neptūnas	10	171	17.1
5.	(Lithuania) Artūras Gudaitis	Rytas	8	128	16.0

=== Points ===
Rank	Player	Club	Games	Points	PPG
1.	(United States) Nick Johnson	Jonava Hipocredit	10	207	20.7
2.	(United States) Jaquan Carlos	Gargždai	10	185	18.5
3.	(Switzerland) Alex Schumacher	Lietkabelis	10	166	16.6
4.	(United States) (Syria) Stanley Davis Jr.	Gargždai	10	163	16.3
5.	(Netherlands) Yannick Franke	Neptūnas	10	162	16.2

=== Rebounds ===
Rank	Player	Club	Games	Rebounds	RPG
1.	(Lithuania) Martynas Echodas	Neptūnas	10	66	6.6
2.	(Lithuania) Benas Griciūnas	Tauragė	10	65	6.5
3.	(Lithuania) Einaras Tubutis	Neptūnas	10	62	6.2
4.	(Lithuania) Martynas Pacevičius	Šiauliai	10	61	6.1
5.	(Lithuania) Jonas Valančiūnas	Žalgiris	5	29	5.8
5.	(United States) Jacob Wiley	Nevėžis-Paskolų klubas	9	52	5.8

=== Assists ===
Rank	Player	Club	Games	Assists	APG
1.	(United States) Jaquan Carlos	Gargždai	10	78	7.8
2.	(Lithuania) Vaidas Kariniauskas	Tauragė	10	56	5.6
3.	(Iceland) Elvar Már Friðriksson	Neptūnas	10	54	5.4
4.	(United States) Cassius Winston	Rytas	7	34	4.9
5.	(Lithuania) Donatas Sabeckis	Jonava Hipocredit	10	47	4.7

=== Individual game highs ===
Category	Player	Club	Opponent	Statistic
PIR	(United States) Nick Johnson	Jonava Hipocredit	Juventus (Oct 31, 2026)	39
Points	(Switzerland) Alex Schumacher	Lietkabelis	Tauragė (Nov 14, 2026)	33
Rebounds	(United States) Tevian Jones	Juventus	Šiauliai (Oct 11, 2026)	13
Assists	(United States) Jaquan Carlos	Gargždai	Lietkabelis (Oct 24, 2026)	11
Steals	(United States) Jaquan Carlos	Gargždai	Šiauliai (Sep 20, 2026)	5
Steals	(Iceland) Elvar Már Friðriksson	Neptūnas	Nevėžis-Paskolų klubas (Oct 3, 2026)	5
Blocks	(United States) Clevon Brown	Jonava Hipocredit	Juventus (Oct 31, 2026)	4

=== Other statistics ===
Category	Player	Club	Games	Average
Steals	(United States) Nick Johnson	Jonava Hipocredit	10	1.9
Blocks	(Nigeria) Kaodirichi Akobundu-Ehiogu	Žalgiris	8	1.8
Turnovers	(Lithuania) Vaidas Kariniauskas	Tauragė	10	3.1
Fouls drawn	(United States) Nick Johnson	Jonava Hipocredit	10	7.2
Minutes	(United States) Nick Johnson	Jonava Hipocredit	10	29:31
FT %	(Lithuania) Arnas Butkevičius	Žalgiris	9	100%
FT %	(Lithuania) Lukas Kreišmontas	Neptūnas	10	100%
FT %	(United States) Donovan Jackson	Tauragė	7	100%
2-Point %	(Lithuania) Normantas Juršys	Juventus	6	100%
2-Point %	(Lithuania) Simas Šarakauskas	Neptūnas	6	100%
3-Point %	(Lithuania) Normantas Juršys	Juventus	6	100%

=== Club statistics ===
Category	Club	Games	Average
PIR	Žalgiris	10	113.5
Points	Žalgiris	10	92.6
Rebounds	Gargždai	10	37.8
Assists	Žalgiris	10	22.4
Steals	Lietkabelis	10	8.9
Blocks	Neptūnas	10	3.9
Turnovers	Šiauliai	10	14.0
FT %	Neptūnas	10	76.0%
2-Point %	Rytas	9	64.6%
3-Point %	Žalgiris	10	42.4%

== Awards ==
All official awards of the 2026–27 LKL season.

=== MVP of the Month ===
Month	Player	Team	PIR	Source
2026
September–October	(United States) Jaquan Carlos	Gargždai	26.3	
November				
December				
2027
January				
February				
March				
April				
May				

== LKL clubs in international and regional competitions ==
Euroleague Basketball competitions
Team	Competition	Progress	Result	W–L
Žalgiris	EuroLeague	Regular season		8–5
Lietkabelis	EuroCup	Regular season Group D		3–5
Neptūnas	EuroCup	Regular season Group C		2–6
Šiauliai	EuroCup	Regular season Group B		3–5

FIBA competitions
Team	Competition	Progress	Result	W–L
Rytas	Champions League	Regular season Group A		3–1
Juventus	Champions League	Regular season Group E		2–2

Regional competitions
Team	Competition	Progress	Result	W–L
Jonava Hipocredit	European North Basketball League	Regular season Group A		1–2
