= 2026–27 King Mindaugas Cup =

2026–27 season of the Lithuanian basketball cup competition

2026–27 Karaliaus Mindaugo taurė
Tournament details
- Country: Lithuania
- Dates: 6 October 2026 – 23 December 2026 (Group stage); 2 January 2027 – 10 January 2027 (Quarterfinals); 20–21 February 2027 (Final four)
- Teams: 11
- Defending champions: Žalgiris

The 2026–27 King Mindaugas Cup, also known as the Citadele Karaliaus Mindaugo taurė for sponsorship purposes, is the twelfth edition of the King Mindaugas Cup. The final four will be hosted by Žalgiris Arena in Kaunas on 20–21 February 2027.

Žalgiris are seven-time defending champions

== Format ==
All 10 teams from 2026–27 LKL season and an additional team from 2026–27 NKL season will participate in this tournament. Teams that will participate in Euroleague Basketball and FIBA tournaments, as well as teams participating European North Basketball League, have received bye's to the quarterfinals stage, while the remaining teams will participate in the round-robin stage, with the top team advancing to the quarterfinals.

== Group stage ==
Pos	Team	Pld	W	L	PF	PA	PD	Qualification	GAR	NEV	JUR	TAU
1	Gargždai	4	3	1	346	327	+19	Advance to Quarterfinals	—	16 Dec	79–75	81–78
2	Nevėžis–Paskolų klubas	4	2	2	345	330	+15		86–101	—	23 Dec	90–79
3	Jurbarkas-Karys-Manvesta	4	2	2	323	334	−11		88–85	69–93	—	91–77
4	Tauragė	4	1	3	315	338	−23		9 Dec	81–76	15 Dec	—

Updated to match(es) played on 17 November 2026. Source: LKL.LT
Legend: Blue = home team win; Red = away team win.

== Quarterfinals ==
All eight quarterfinal teams will be ranked from 1st to 8th according to the results of the first round of the 2026–27 LKL season. (If the NKL representative advanced to the quarterfinal, it will automatically be ranked 8th). The quarterfinal pairs will be drawn on a sporting basis: 1st place will meet 8th, 2nd place – 7th, 3rd – 6th, and 4th – 5th. Qualified teams will face-off each other in a home-and-away format, with the overall cumulative score determining the winner of a match. The winners of each pair would then qualify for the Final four. The quarterfinal matches will take place on January 2–3 and 9–10, 2027.

== Final four ==
The final four will be hosted by Žalgiris Arena in Kaunas on 20–21 February 2027.

Semifinals; 20 February

Final; 21 February
Third place 21 February
