= Vitalijus Kozys =

Lithuanian basketball player

No. 10 – BC Tauragė
- Position: Power forward / small forward
- League: LKL

Personal information
- Born: 30 April 1999 (age 27) Kretinga, Lithuania
- Listed height: 2.01 m (6 ft 7 in)
- Listed weight: 97 kg (214 lb)

Career information
- NBA draft: 2021: undrafted
- Playing career: 2015–present

Career history
- 2015–2017: BC Kuršiai
- 2017-2021: Žalgiris
- 2017–2021: →Žalgiris-2
- 2018–2019: →Vytautas Prienai–Birštonas
- 2021–2022: CBet Jonava
- 2022–2024: BC Wolves
- 2024–2025: Nevėžis Kėdainiai
- 2025–2026: Neptūnas Klaipėda
- 2026–present: BC Tauragė
Medals
Representing Lithuania
FIBA Under-17 World Cup
Bronze medal – third place	2016 Spain	U17 National Team
FIBA Europe Under-18 Championship
Bronze medal – third place	2017 Slovakia	U18 National Team
FIBA Europe Under-16 Championship
Silver medal – second place	2015 Lithuania	U16 National Team

Vitalijus Kozys (born 30 April 1999) is a Lithuanian professional basketball player for BC Tauragė of the Lithuanian Basketball League (LKL).

== Professional career ==
On 1 August 2022, Kozys signed a two-year contract with BC Wolves of the Lithuanian Basketball League (LKL).

On 21 June 2024, Kozys signed with Nevėžis Kėdainiai of the Lithuanian Basketball League (LKL).

On 12 June 2025, Kozys signed with Neptūnas Klaipėda of the Lithuanian Basketball League (LKL) and the EuroCup.

On 20 July 2026, Kozys signed one–year contract with BC Tauragė of the Lithuanian Basketball League (LKL).

== National team career ==
Kozys was a member of the Lithuanian junior national teams. He represented Lithuania at the 2015 FIBA Europe Under-16 Championship, where he averaged 8.6 points, 4.7 rebounds and 1.3 assists, helping the team to a silver medal. He also won bronze medals at both the 2016 FIBA Under-17 World Championship, and the 2017 FIBA U18 European Championship.

== Career statistics ==
Legend
GP	Games played	GS	Games started	MPG	Minutes per game
FG%	Field-goal percentage	3P%	3-point field-goal percentage	FT%	Free-throw percentage
RPG	Rebounds per game	APG	Assists per game	SPG	Steals per game
BPG	Blocks per game	PPG	Points per game	PIR	Performance index rating
**Bold**	Career high

=== EuroCup ===
Year	Team	GP	GS	MPG	FG%	3P%	FT%	RPG	APG	SPG	BPG	PPG	PIR
2023–24	Wolves	**15**	3	9.7	**.435**	.231	**.727**	1.6	.2	**.5**	.0	2.1	**2.0**
2025–26	Neptūnas Klaipėda	**15**	**5**	**13.7**	.310	**.241**	.400	**2.3**	**.3**	.3	**.3**	**2.7**	1.5
Career		30	8	11.7	.354	.238	.516	2.0	.3	.4	.1	2.4	1.8
