= James Blackmon Jr. =

American basketball player (born 1995)

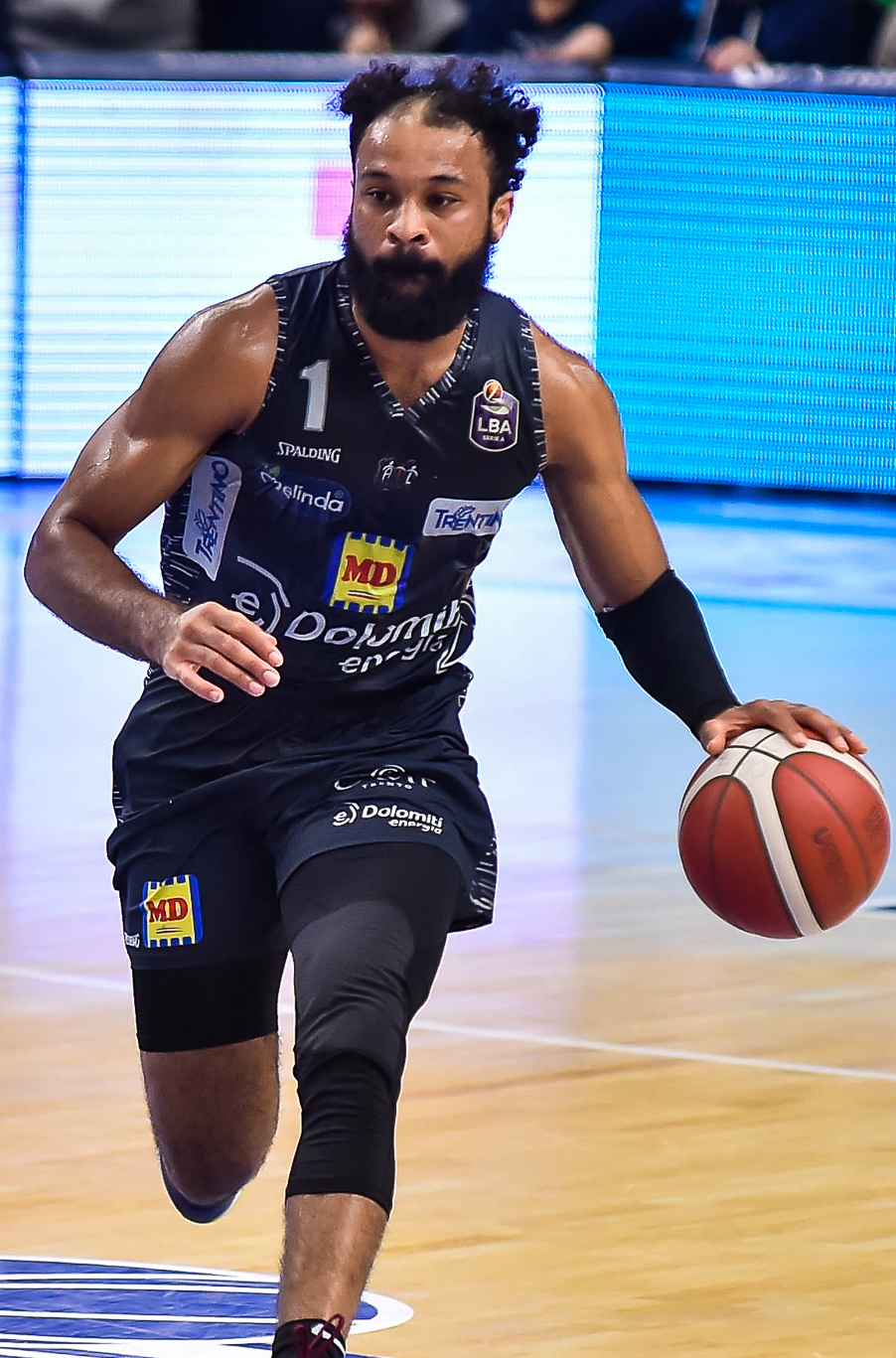
- Blackmon with Aquila Basket Trento in 2020

No. 1 – BC Tauragė
- Position: Shooting guard
- League: LKL

Personal information
- Born: April 25, 1995 (age 31) Chicago, Illinois, U.S.
- Listed height: 1.93 m (6 ft 4 in)
- Listed weight: 91 kg (201 lb)

Career information
- High school: Bishop Luers (Fort Wayne, Indiana); Marion (Marion, Indiana)
- College: Indiana (2014–2017)
- NBA draft: 2017: undrafted
- Playing career: 2017–present

Career history
- 2017–2018: Delaware 87ers
- 2018: Wisconsin Herd
- 2018–2019: VL Pesaro
- 2019–2020: Aquila Basket Trento
- 2020–2021: Beşiktaş
- 2021–2022: Pınar Karşıyaka
- 2025–2026: Leuven Bears
- 2026–present: BC Tauragė

Career highlights
- Third-team All-Big Ten (2017); Big Ten All-Freshman Team (2015); McDonald's High School All-American (2014); First-team Parade All-American (2014)
- Stats at Basketball Reference

James Kumar Blackmon Jr. (born April 25, 1995) is an American basketball player for BC Tauragė of the Lithuanian Basketball League (LKL). He played college basketball for the Indiana Hoosiers.

== High school career ==
Blackmon played three years at Bishop Luers High School and his senior year at Marion High School. In his senior season, he averaged 33.4 points and 4.2 three-pointers (47%), and broke his father's school record by scoring 54 points in a game. He ranks #9 on Indiana's all-time scoring list. He was ranked the 20th best player in the class by ESPN and was recruited heavily by Indiana, Michigan, Kentucky, Kansas, and Michigan State. He originally committed to Indiana before his freshman season, but reopened his recruitment before his senior season. His final verbal commitment to Indiana was televised live on ESPNU. He scored 13 points in the McDonald's All-American Game and won the three-point contest. He also scored 23 in the Jordan Brand Classic. He finished third in Indiana Mr. Basketball voting, behind Trey Lyles and Trevon Bluiett.

College recruiting
Name	Hometown	School	Height	Weight	Commit date
James Blackmon Jr. G	Marion, IN	Marion HS	6 ft 4 in (1.93 m)	180 lb (82 kg)	Oct 31, 2013
James Blackmon Jr. G	Recruit ratings: Scout: Rivals: 247Sports: ESPN:				
Overall recruit ranking: Scout: 32 Rivals: 22 247Sports: 12 ESPN: 20
Note: In many cases, Scout, Rivals, 247Sports, On3, and ESPN may conflict in their listings of height and weight.; In these cases, the average was taken. ESPN grades are on a 100-point scale.; Sources: "Indiana Commit List for 2014". Rivals.; "Indiana Hoosiers". ESPN.; "2014 Team Ranking". Rivals.

== College career ==
=== Freshman year ===
During Indiana's five-game preseason Canada trip, Blackmon led the team in scoring with 18.8 points, despite focusing mainly on his defense. As a freshman, he earned the starting spot in the backcourt alongside Yogi Ferrell. He averaged 15.7 points per game, the sixth best average for any freshman in the country. He ranked second on the team in both scoring and rebounding (5.3). Blackmon was a prolific three-point shooter, breaking Eric Gordon's Indiana freshman record with 77 three-point field goals made. He earned honorable mention All-Big Ten, a unanimous spot on the Big Ten All-Freshman team and was named Big Ten Freshman of the Week twice.

=== Sophomore year ===
Blackmon Jr. had a strong first two months, setting career-highs in field goal percentage (.480) and three-point field goal percentage (.463), until a right knee injury ended his season. Blackmon underwent surgery in January 2016, his second knee surgery in a span of just six months – he had surgery to repair a torn meniscus in his other knee before the season. He finished his sophomore campaign averaging 15.8 points in just thirteen total games. Indiana went 15–3 in the Big Ten season in his absence, winning an outright league title in the process.

=== Junior year ===
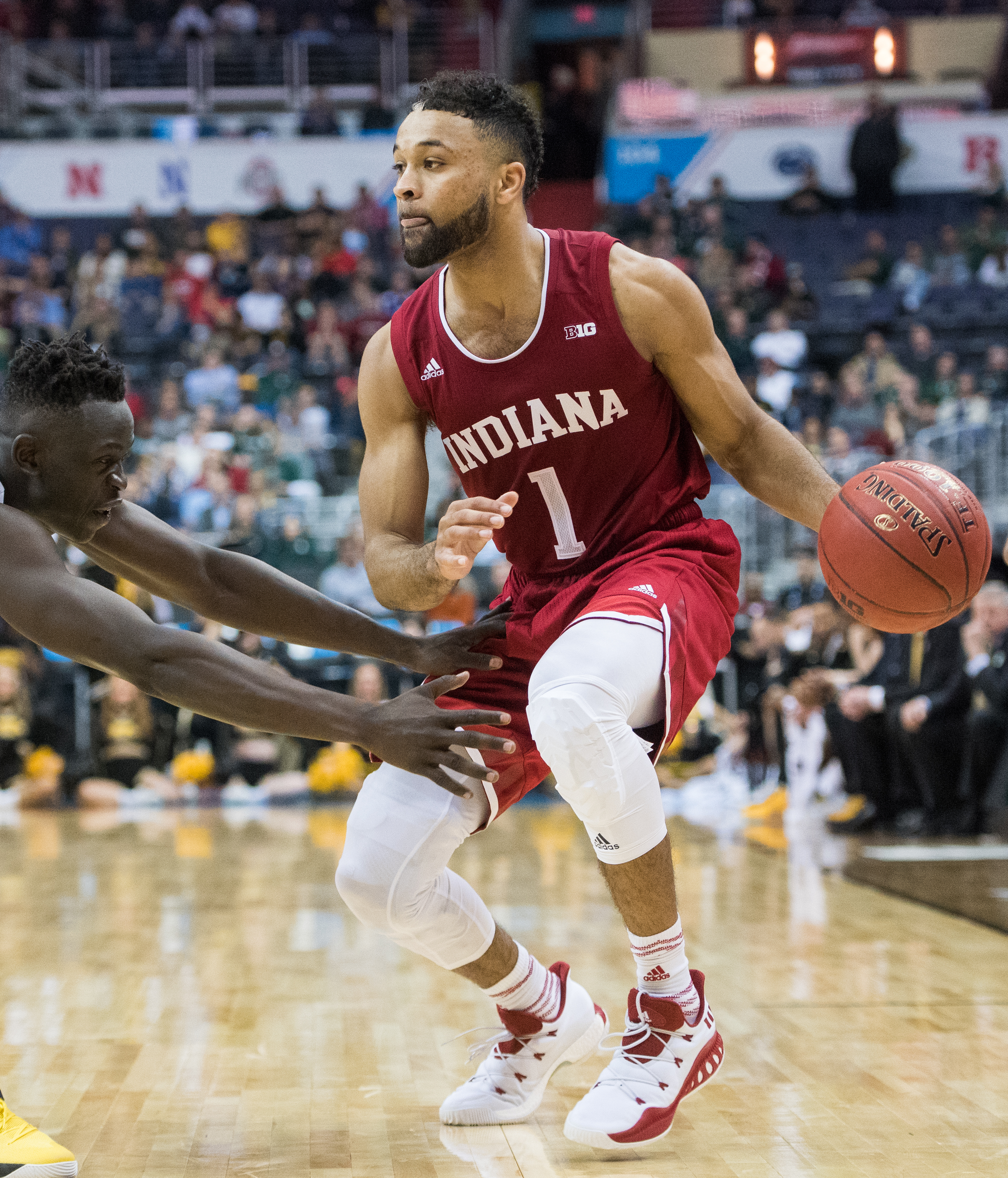
Blackmon in March 2017

On November 14, 2016, Blackmon Jr. was named National Player of the Week by NBCSports.com and Big Ten Co-Player of the Week. He averaged 17.3 points per game on a team that went 19–16. After the end of his junior year, he decided to enter the 2017 NBA draft.

=== College statistics ===
Year	Team	GP	GS	MPG	FG%	3P%	FT%	RPG	APG	SPG	BPG	PPG
2014–15	Indiana	33	33	30.0	.420	.387	.806	5.3	1.5	0.6	.1	15.7
2015–16	Indiana	13	12	24.5	.480	.463	.852	4.2	1.7	1.2	.4	15.8
2016–17	Indiana	30	30	30.5	.477	.423	.837	4.8	1.9	.7	.0	17.0
Career		76	75	29.3	.452	.415	.824	4.9	1.7	0.8	.1	16.3

== Professional career ==
Blackmon signed as an undrafted free agent with the Philadelphia 76ers on June 23, 2017. After some successful performances with the team during the 2017 NBA Summer League, he signed a training camp contract with them on August 30 that same year. He was waived in the preseason on October 14, 2017.

On January 26, 2018, Blackmon was traded by the Delaware 87ers to the Wisconsin Herd in exchange for Shannon Brown and Cameron Oliver.

He signed with VL Pesaro of the Lega Basket Serie A on August 6, 2018.

On July 19, 2019, he has signed with Aquila Basket Trento of the Italian Lega Basket Serie A (LBA).

On October 23, 2020, short after the beginning of the season, he signed a one-year contract with Beşiktaş in the Turkish League and Basketball Champions League.

On July 8, 2021, he has signed with Pınar Karşıyaka of the Turkish Super League (BSL).

On July 2, 2025, he has signed a 1-year deal with Leuven Bears of the BNXT League. 3 years after his knee injury, he will continue his career in Belgium.

On August 13, 2026, Blackmon signed one–year contract with BC Tauragė of the Lithuanian Basketball League (LKL).

== Family ==
Blackmon's father, James Blackmon Sr., was drafted into the NBA after an outstanding career at Kentucky.. He now coaches at Marion. His father is of African-American descent, while his mother Sailaja is of Telugu descent. Blackmon has two brothers: Vijay, who was a walk-on for the Indiana Hoosiers men's basketball basketball team, and now is a member of the Lindenwood University men's basketball team, and Jalen, who plays for Stetson University.
