= Ricky Lindo =

American basketball player (born 2000)

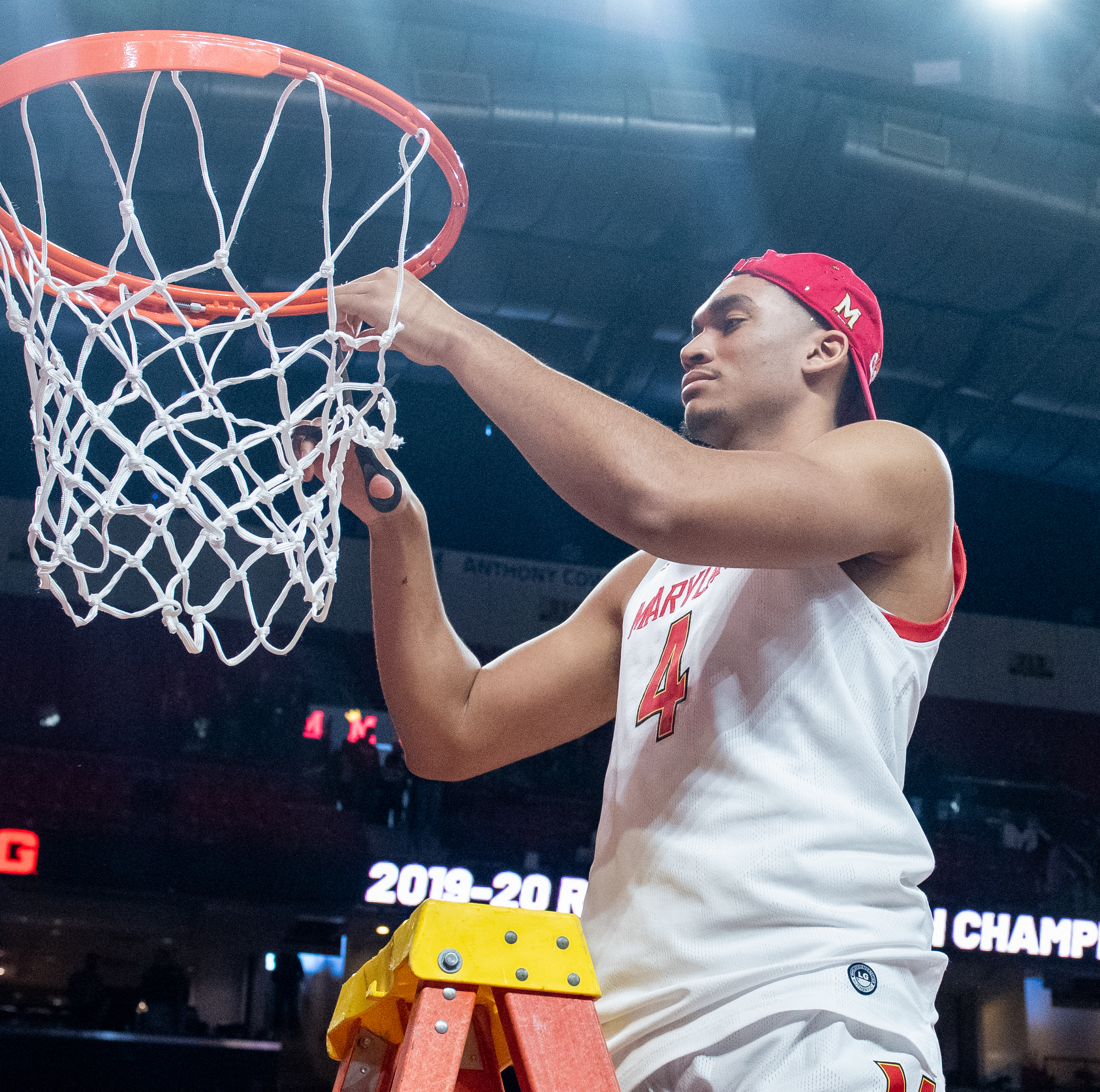
- Lindo cutting down the net for Maryland, March 2020

No. 4 – Rytas Vilnius
- Position: Forward
- League: LKL; BCL

Personal information
- Born: September 26, 2000 (age 26) Washington, D.C., U.S.
- Listed height: 6 ft 8 in (2.03 m)
- Listed weight: 220 lb (100 kg)

Career information
- High school: Woodrow Wilson (Washington, D.C.)
- College: Maryland (2018–2020); George Washington (2020–2023)
- NBA draft: 2023: undrafted
- Playing career: 2023–present

Career history
- 2023–2024: Kouvot
- 2024–2025: Ironi Nes Ziona
- 2025–2026: JL Bourg
- 2026–present: Rytas Vilnius

Career highlights
- EuroCup champion (2026)

Ricardo Lindo Jr. (born September 26, 2000) is an American-Panamanian basketball player who plays the forward position for Rytas Vilnius of the Lithuanian Basketball League (LKL) and the Basketball Champions League (BCL). He played college basketball for the University of Maryland and George Washington University. In 2023–24, he played for Kouvot in the Finnish Korisliiga. He has also played for the Panama national basketball team.

== Early and personal life ==
Lindo is the son of Ricardo and Erika Lindo who were Panamanian by birth, and has two brothers, Erik and Toby. His hometown is Washington, DC. He is a dual American-Panamanian citizen. He is 6 ft 8 in (203 cm) tall, and weighs 220 pounds (100 kg).

He attended Woodrow Wilson High School in Northwest, D.C. Playing for the basketball team, Lindo was All-Metro Honorable Mention. As he graduated, he received over 20 college offers, including from Harvard University, East Carolina University, Saint Louis University, La Salle University, and the University of Massachusetts.

== College ==
=== University of Maryland ===
Lindo attended the University of Maryland on scholarship, as a 3-star forward. In 2018-19 as a 17-year-old freshman for the Maryland Terrapins he averaged 12.2 minutes, 1.6 points, and 3.5 rebounds per game. He was the seventh man in an eight-player rotation. In 2019-20 as a sophomore he averaged 7.0 minutes, 1.7 points, and 1.9 rebounds per game, shooting 65.5% from the field. In March 2020, he entered the NCAA transfer portal.

=== George Washington University ===
He then attended George Washington University. In 2020–21 playing for the George Washington Revolutionaries, Lindo averaged 11.4 points and 10.7 rebounds per game, while shooting 52.4% from the field, in a shortened season of seven games.

In 2021–22 Lindo averaged 7.7 points, 7.8 rebounds (5th in the Atlantic 10 Conference), 1.6 blocks (8th), and 1.5 steals (8th) per game. In 2022–23 he averaged 10.6 points, 7.6 rebounds (5th in the Conference), 1.2 blocks (7th), and 1.2 steals per game, while shooting 56.2% from the field and 69.7% from 2-point range (2nd in the Conference; 15th in the NCAA), while leading the Conference with 111 personal fouls.

== NBA Summer League ==
Lindo played in the 2024 NBA Summer League for the 2024 Dallas Mavericks NBA2K Summer League team in Las Vegas, Nevada. He played in three games, averaging 4.6 minutes, 1.0 points, and 1.7 rebounds per game.

== International leagues ==
=== Kouvot ===
In 2023–24, he played for Kouvot in the Finnish Korisliiga. Lindo averaged 17.6 points (7th in the league), 10.2 rebounds (5th), 2.0 blocked shots (4th), and 1.6 steals (8th) per game, while shooting 54.1% from the field.

=== Ironi Nes Ziona ===
Beginning in 2024, Lindo has played the forward position for Ironi Nes Ziona in the Israeli Basketball Premier League. For Ironi Nes Ziona, Lindo played 24 games, averaging 12.5 points, 7.2 rebounds, and 2.3 assists per game. He reached the playoffs with Ironi Nes Ziona but lost to Maccabi Tel Aviv 0–3 in the Quatre Finals.

=== JL Bourg ===
On June 30, 2025, he signed with JL Bourg of the LNB Pro A.

=== Rytas Vilnius ===
On July 24, 2026, Lindo signed one–year contract with Rytas Vilnius of the Lithuanian Basketball League (LKL) and the Basketball Champions League (BCL).

== Representing Panama ==
Lindo represented Panama in the 2017 Centrobasket U17 Championship, in which the team took third place, as he averaged 22.5 points and 12.3 rebounds per game. He represented Panama's senior team in the 2018 Americas World Cup Qualifier (averaging 5.3 points and 5.0 rebounds per game), and the 2024 AmeriCup Qualifiers (averaging 14.0 points and 7.0 rebounds per game).
