= Matas Jogėla =

Lithuanian basketball player

- Jogėla with the Lithuania national team in 2026

No. 23 – Rytas Vilnius
- Position: Shooting guard / small forward
- League: LKL; BCL

Personal information
- Born: 10 July 1998 (age 28) Tauragė, Lithuania
- Listed height: 2.01 m (6 ft 7 in)
- Listed weight: 90 kg (198 lb)

Career information
- NBA draft: 2019: undrafted
- Playing career: 2015–present

Career history
- 2016–2019: Žalgiris Kaunas
- 2016–2018: → Žalgiris-2 Kaunas
- 2018–2019: → Dzūkija Alytus
- 2019–2023: Neptūnas
- 2023–2024: Río Breogán
- 2024–2025: Wolves Twinsbet
- 2025–2026: Dolomiti Energia Trento
- 2026–present: Rytas Vilnius

Career highlights
- Lithuanian League Most Improved Player (2023)
Medals
Men's basketball
Representing Lithuania
FIBA Europe Under-18 Championship
Silver medal – second place	2016 Turkey	National team

Matas Jogėla (born 10 July 1998) is a Lithuanian basketball player for the Rytas Vilnius of the Lithuanian Basketball League (LKL) and the Basketball Champions League (BCL). A native of Tauragė, he has competed with the Lithuania under-18 team, winning a silver medal.

== Professional career ==
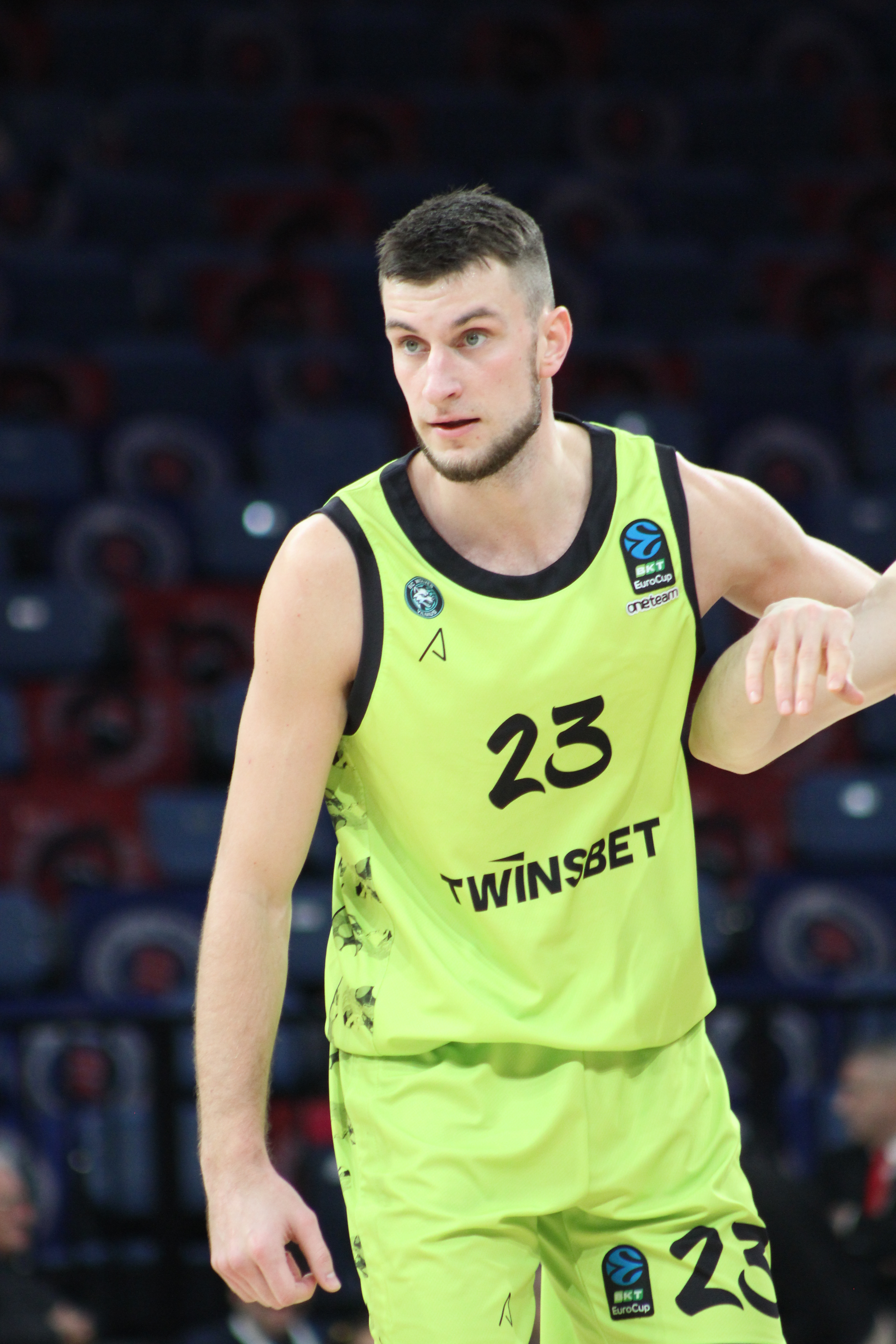
Jogėla with Wolves in 2024

Jogėla began his career with the reserve team of Lietuvos rytas Vilnius, averaging 9.3 points, 2.0 rebounds, and 1.0 assists at the Adidas Next Generation Tournament (ANGT) in 2015–16.

In his first season with Žalgiris-2 Kaunas of the National Basketball League (NKL) in 2016–17, Jogėla averaged 5.6 points, 3.6 rebounds, and 1.1 assists per game. However, a foot injury sidelined him for a large part of the season. Next year, he was one of the team's leading players, averaging 11.5 points and 5 rebounds.

On 10 April 2018, Jogėla announced his intentions to enter the 2018 NBA draft. In August, Jogėla joined Žalgiris Kaunas preseason camp, but was then loaned to Dzūkija Alytus for the rest of the 2018–19 season.

On 19 September 2019, Jogėla signed with Neptūnas Klaipėda of the Lithuanian Basketball League (LKL). Jogėla slowly rose through the ranks with Neptūnas, becoming the team leader in his final year.

On 13 June 2023, Jogėla signed a one-year deal with Río Breogán of the Spanish Liga ACB.

On 3 July 2024, Jogėla signed a two-year contract with Wolves Twinsbet of the Lithuanian Basketball League (LKL) and the EuroCup.

On 26 July 2025, Jogėla signed a two-year contract with Dolomiti Energia Trento of the Italian Lega Basket Serie A (LBA).

On 30 June 2026, Jogėla signed a two-year contract with Rytas Vilnius of the Lithuanian Basketball League (LKL) and the Basketball Champions League (BCL).

== National team career ==
Jogėla represented Lithuania at the 2016 FIBA Europe Under-18 Championship. He averaged 1.4 points, 1.6 rebounds, and 0.4 assists as his team claimed the silver medal.
