= Dovydas Giedraitis =

Lithuanian basketball player (born 2000)

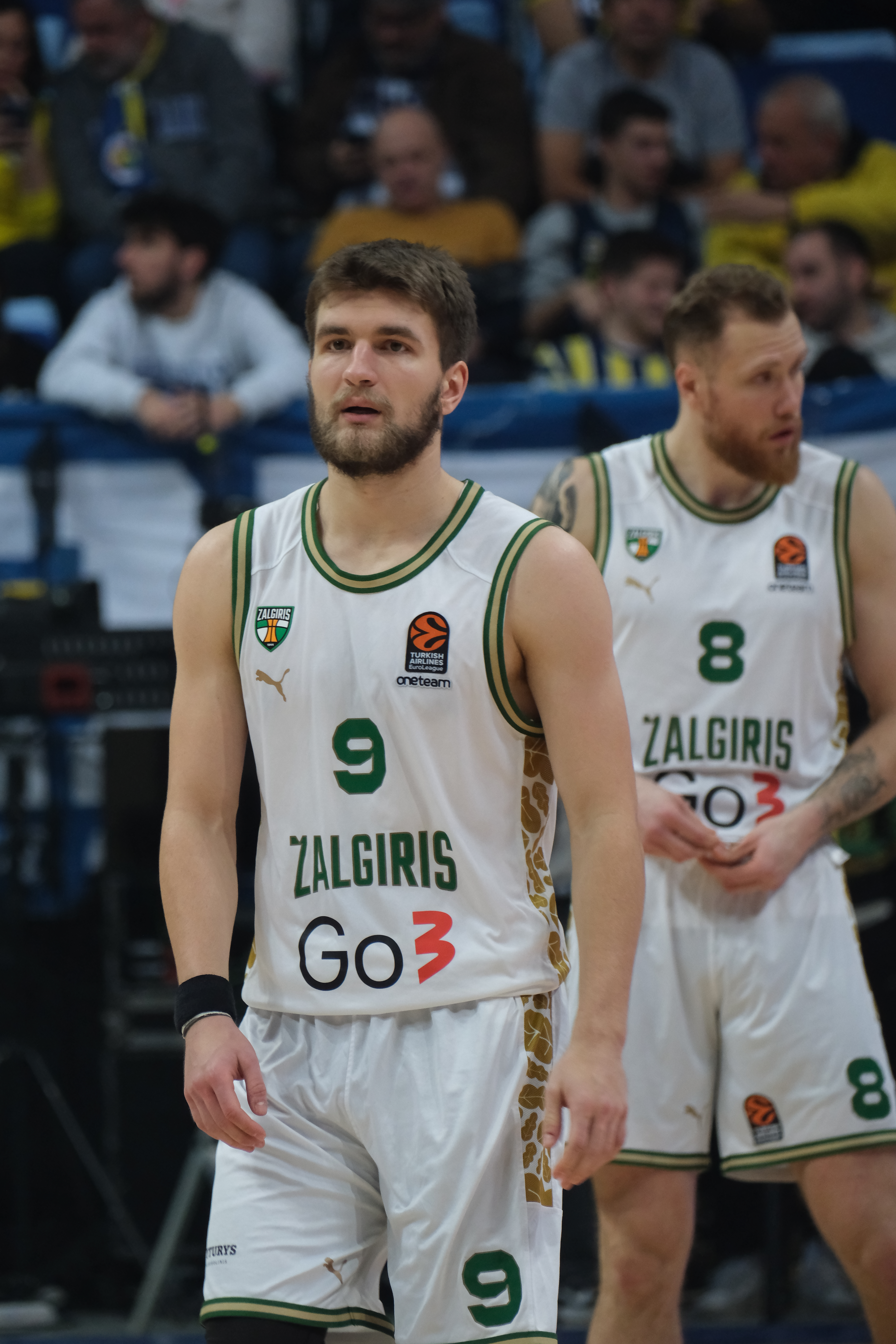
- Giedraitis with Žalgiris Kaunas in 2025

No. 9 – Žalgiris Kaunas
- Position: Point guard / shooting guard
- League: LKL; EuroLeague

Personal information
- Born: August 17, 2000 (age 26) Vilnius, Lithuania
- Listed height: 1.93 m (6 ft 4 in)
- Listed weight: 93 kg (205 lb)

Career information
- NBA draft: 2022: undrafted
- Playing career: 2016–present

Career history
- 2016–2017: Ežerūnas Molėtai
- 2017–2022: Estudiantes
- 2017–2019: →Estudiantes B
- 2021–2022: →Lietkabelis Panevėžys
- 2022–present: Žalgiris Kaunas

Career highlights
- 2× Lithuanian League champion (2023, 2025); King Mindaugas Cup winner (2023–2026)
Medals
Men's basketball
Representing Lithuania
FIBA Europe Under-16 Championship
Silver medal – second place	2016 Poland	U16 National Team

Dovydas Giedraitis (born August 17, 2000) is a Lithuanian professional basketball player for Žalgiris Kaunas of the Lithuanian Basketball League (LKL) and the EuroLeague.

== Early career ==
Giedraitis started his career in 2016, playing in the Lithuanian second-tier NKL with Ežerūnas Molėtai.

== Professional career ==
=== Estudiantes (2017–2022) ===
In August 2017, Giedraitis signed a long-term contract with Movistar Estudiantes of the Spanish Liga ACB. Under the terms of the deal, Giedraitis spent the first two seasons playing for the club's reserve U-18 team Estudiantes B in the fourth-tier Liga EBA. On 27 September 2019, Giedraitis made his Liga ACB debut with Estudiantes, scoring three points off the bench in an away loss against Saski Baskonia. On 15 July 2020, Giedraitis signed a contract extension with the club until 2023. On 3 August 2021, the deal was extended until 2024.

==== Loan to Lietkabelis (2021–2022) ====
After the team's relegation to LEB Oro in 2021, Giedraitis was loaned to Lietkabelis Panevėžys of the Lithuanian Basketball League (LKL) for the 2021–22 season on 26 July 2021.

=== Žalgiris Kaunas (2022–present) ===
On 6 August 2022, Giedraitis signed a long-term (3+2 year) deal with the Lithuanian powerhouse Žalgiris Kaunas, who bought him out of his previous contract.

== National team career ==
Giedraitis represented Lithuania at the youth level in four FIBA tournaments from 2016 to 2019, and won the silver medal during the 2016 FIBA U16 European Championship.

== Personal ==
Giedraitis was born in Vilnius, Lithuania. He is the second born child of the former Lithuanian national team guard Andrius Giedraitis. His older brother Karolis Giedraitis also professionally plays basketball.

== Career statistics ==
Legend
GP	Games played	GS	Games started	MPG	Minutes per game
FG%	Field-goal percentage	3P%	3-point field-goal percentage	FT%	Free-throw percentage
RPG	Rebounds per game	APG	Assists per game	SPG	Steals per game
BPG	Blocks per game	PPG	Points per game	PIR	Performance index rating
**Bold**	Career high

=== EuroLeague ===
Year	Team	GP	GS	MPG	FG%	3P%	FT%	RPG	APG	SPG	BPG	PPG	PIR
2022–23	Žalgiris	16	4	9.1	.429	.143	**1.000**	.5	.6	.5	—	2.1	0.8
2023–24	Žalgiris	**30**	**19**	16.6	.398	**.426**	.923	1.0	1.0	**1.1**	—	4.8	3.6
2024–25	Žalgiris	**30**	18	**24.0**	**.436**	.390	.785	**1.7**	**1.9**	.6	**.0**	**5.8**	**4.5**
Career		76	41	18.0	.420	.379	.881	1.2	1.3	.8	.0	4.6	3.3

=== EuroCup ===
Year	Team	GP	GS	MPG	FG%	3P%	FT%	RPG	APG	SPG	BPG	PPG	PIR
2021–22	Lietkabelis	14	6	25.8	.387	.404	.929	1.6	1.7	.6	.1	8.6	5.3
Career		14	6	25.8	.387	.404	.929	1.6	1.7	.6	.1	8.6	5.3
