= Haris Bratanovic =

Belgian basketball player

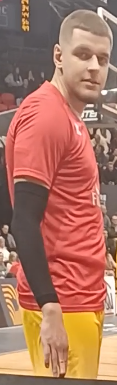
- Haris Bratanovic during a timeout on January 20, 2023

No. 16 – BC Tauragė
- Position: Center
- League: LKL

Personal information
- Born: 20 April 2001 (age 25) Ghent, Belgium
- Listed height: 209 cm (6 ft 10 in)
- Listed weight: 110 kg (243 lb)

Career history
- 2018–2020: FC Barcelona B
- 2020–2026: Oostende
- 2026–present: BC Tauragė

Career highlights
- BNXT League champion (2024); BNXT Belgian Rising Star of the Year (2022); BNXT Supercup winner (2021); 3x Belgian League champion (2021,2024, 2025); 2x Belgian Cup winner (2021, 2025)

Haris Bratanovic (born 20 April 2001) is a Belgian basketball player for BC Tauragė of the Lithuanian Basketball League (LKL) and Belgium. Standing at 2.09 m (6 ft 10 1/2 in), he plays as center.

== Early career ==
Bratanovic was born in Belgium and is of Bosnian descent. At age 17, he left his team Falco Gent to play for the youth department of FC Barcelona.

== Professional career ==
In the 2018–19 season, Bratanovic made his debut in the Spanish LEB Gold with FC Barcelona Bàsquet B. On 2 March 2020, it was announced he broke his contract with Barcelona.

On 29 April 2020, Bratanovic signed a 5-year contract with BC Oostende until 2025.

On 27 August 2026, Bratanovic signed one–year contract with BC Tauragė of the Lithuanian Basketball League (LKL).

== Honours ==
=== Club ===
Oostende

- Pro Basketball League: (2021)
- Belgian Cup: (2021)
- BNXT Supercup: (2021)

=== Individual ===
- BNXT League Belgian Rising Star of the Year: (2022)
