= Kaodirichi Akobundu-Ehiogu =

Nigerian basketball player (born 1999)

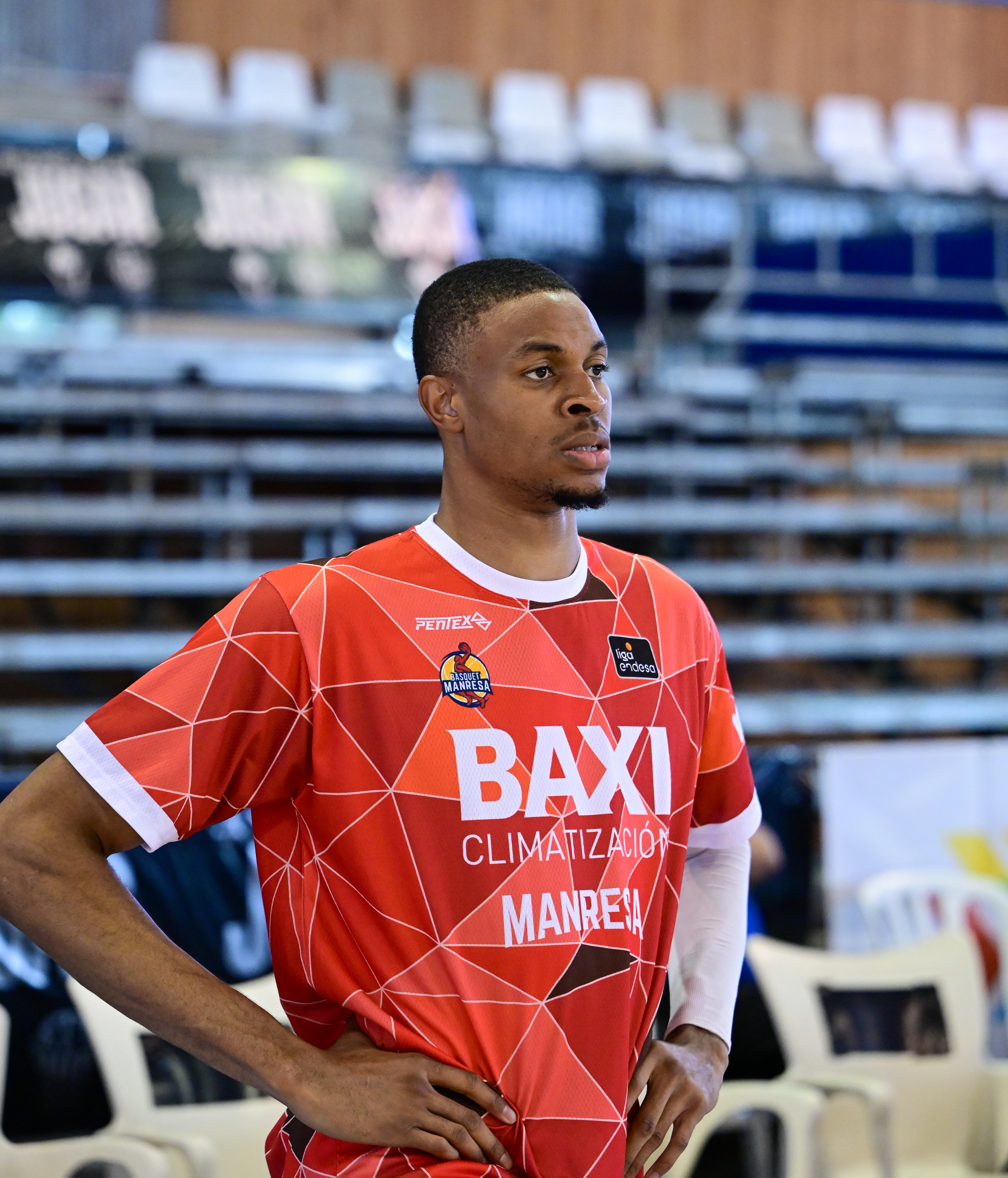
- Akobundu-Ehiogu with Manresa in 2025

No. 2 – Žalgiris Kaunas
- Position: Center
- League: LKL; EuroLeague

Personal information
- Born: October 7, 1999 (age 27) Aboh Mbaise, Nigeria
- Listed height: 2.08 m (6 ft 10 in)
- Listed weight: 110 kg (243 lb)

Career information
- High school: Poteet (Mesquite, Texas, U.S.)
- College: SAGU (2018–2019); UT Arlington (2020–2022); Memphis (2022–2023)
- NBA draft: 2023: undrafted
- Playing career: 2023–present

Career history
- 2023–2024: Tigers Tübingen
- 2024–2025: Varese
- 2025–2026: Manresa
- 2026–present: Žalgiris

Career highlights
- EuroCup blocks leader (2026)

Kaodirichi "Kao" Nkemjika Akobundu-Ehiogu (born October 7, 1999) is a Nigerian professional basketball player for Žalgiris of the Lithuanian LKL and the EuroLeague. Standing at 6 ft 10 in (2.08 m), he plays as a center. He previously played college basketball for Nelson University and the Arlington Mavericks.

== Early life and high school career ==
Born in Aboh Mbaise, Nigeria, Akobundu-Ehiogu grew up in his hometown before moving to Lagos with his siblings after the passing of his parents. He didn't start playing basketball until he moved to the United States with his family in 2012. He played high school basketball for Poteet in Mesquite, Texas.

== College career ==
In 2018, he played his first year of college basketball for Southwestern Assemblies of God University (SAGU) in Waxahachie, Texas, a member of the NAIA.

After not playing basketball for a year, he joined UT Arlington of the NCAA Division I in 2020. In two seasons with the Mavericks, Akobundu-Ehiogu recorded 134 blocks.

He played a final year of college basketball for the University of Memphis in the 2022–23 season.

== Professional career ==
After finishing his college basketball career, Akobundu-Ehiogu signed a one-season contract with German side Tigers Tübingen in August 2023. With Tübingen, he took part in the 2023–24 season of the Basketball Bundesliga.

In July 2024, he signed for Pallacanestro Varese of the Italian Serie A.

=== Bàsquet Manresa (2025–2026) ===
Akobundu-Ehiogu signed a one-season contract with Bàsquet Manresa of the Liga ACB and EuroCup in July 2025. Shortly after the start of the season, his athleticism caught the attention of Spanish media, being dubbed 'the most spectacular player in the ACB'.

On July 3, 2026, it was announced that Akobundu-Ehiogu would be participating with the Dallas Mavericks in the 2026 NBA Summer League.

=== Žalgiris (2026–present) ===
On August 2, 2026, Akobundu-Ehiogu signed with Žalgiris of the Lithuanian LKL and the EuroLeague.

== National team career ==
Akobundu-Ehiogu has represented the Nigerian national team internationally, taking part in the 2025 AfroBasket in Angola.
