= Tauragė Arena =

Indoor arena in Tauragė, Lithuania

- Tauragės arena
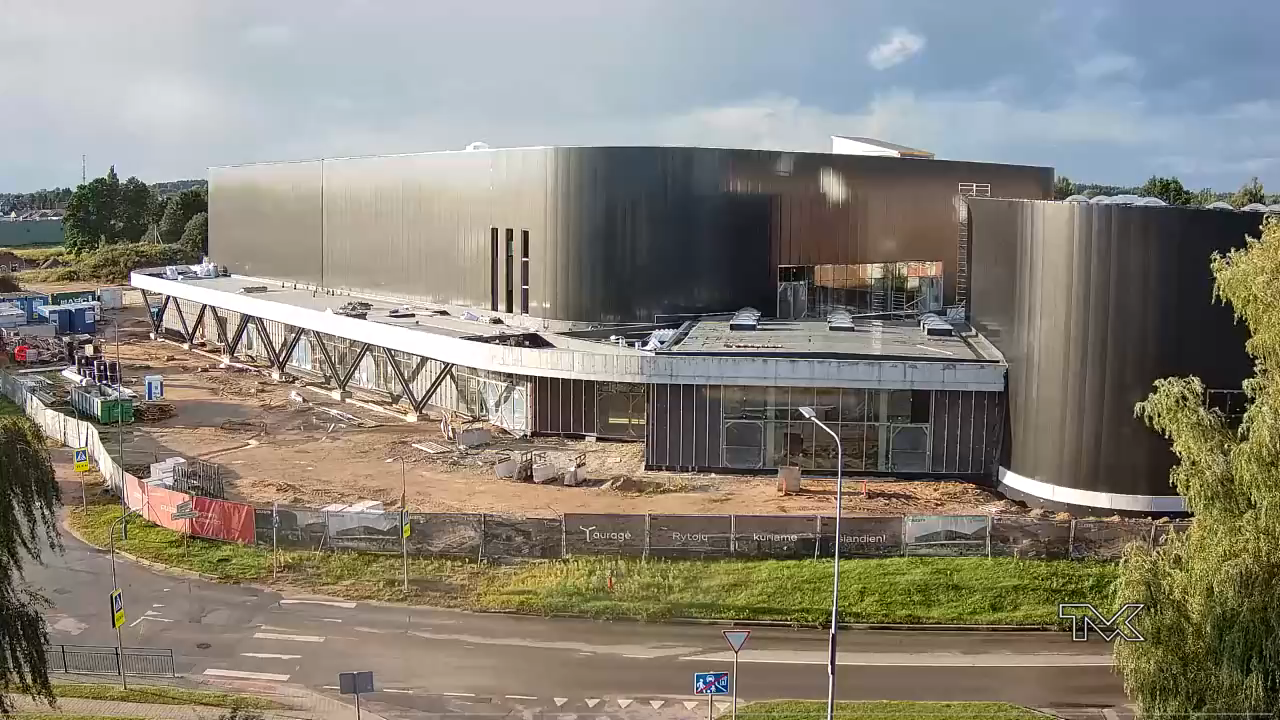
- Interactive map of Tauragė Arena
- Address: Bernotiškės St. 11, LT-72222; Tauragė; Lithuania
- Location: Tauragė, Lithuania
- Coordinates: 55.257°N 22.304°E
- Capacity: Basketball 1,510; Concerts 2,500
- Record attendance: 1,780 (Tauragė vs Jonava, 19 September 2026)

Construction
- Groundbreaking: 2023
- Built: 2023–26
- Opened: 19 September 2026
- Years active: 2026–present
- Cost: € 20.5 million
- Architect: Synergy Solutions
- Builder: Gilesta

Tenant
- BC Tauragė

Website
- tauragesarena.lt

Tauragė Arena is an indoor sports and cultural complex in Tauragė, Lithuania. The arena is designed to host major cultural events and concerts and house a multifunctional sports and cultural center. It comply requirements for basketball games and feature two multi-purpose courts, fitness and aerobics studios, and facilities for beach volleyball. Moreover, it also include a press conference room and a café-bar for visitors.

== History ==
The contract for the Tauragė Arena construction works (worth ~20 million Euro) was signed in 2023, and construction began at the end of 2023. The construction was completed in 2026.

On 19 September 2026, BC Tauragė played its first-ever Lithuanian Basketball League home game at the Tauragė Arena and achieved a 95–90 victory versus the BC Jonava.
