= Alex Schumacher =

American-Swiss basketball player (born 2001)

No. 2 – Lietkabelis Panevėžys
- Position: Point guard / shooting guard
- League: LKL; EuroCup

Personal information
- Born: February 20, 2001 (age 25) Vancouver, Washington, U.S.
- Listed height: 6 ft 3 in (1.91 m)
- Listed weight: 185 lb (84 kg)

Career information
- High school: Skyview (Vancouver, Washington)
- College: Saint Martin's (2019–2022); Seattle (2022–2024)
- NBA draft: 2024: undrafted
- Playing career: 2024–present

Career history
- 2024–2025: Windy City Bulls
- 2025–2026: Valley Suns
- 2026: Long Island Nets
- 2026–present: Lietkabelis Panevėžys

Career highlights
- CBI champion (2024); Second-team All-WAC (2024); Second-team All-GNAC (2021)
- Stats at NBA.com
- Stats at Basketball Reference

Alexander Roland Schumacher Bell (born February 20, 2001) is an American-Swiss professional basketball player for Lietkabelis Panevėžys of the Lithuanian Basketball League (LKL) and the EuroCup. He played college basketball for the Saint Martin's Saints and the Seattle Redhawks.

== High school career ==
Schumacher played basketball for Skyview High School in Vancouver, Washington where he was twice named Greater St. Helens Co-Player of the Year in his junior and senior years. Schumacher was named to the second-team All-League in his freshman and sophomore years. He averaged almost 18 points per game his junior year and 19 points per game in his senior year and finished as the all-time leader in points scored in school history.

== College career ==
Schumacher started his college career at the Division II school, Saint Martin's where in his first year, he averaged 13.4 points, 4.5 rebounds and 2.7 assists in 26 games. As a sophomore, Schumacher led the team in points (15.3), assists (2.5) and steals (1.8) while also averaging 4.4 rebounds in a COVID-shortened 12 games. The following season he averaged 14.6 points and 4.9 rebounds while leading the team to the GNAC regular season title and second-team All-GNAC honors.

Schumacher transferred to Seattle University ahead of the 2022–23 season. He played in all 32 games, starting in 30, and finished with 12.0 points, 2.7 assists and 3.7 rebounds per game. In his final season at Seattle, he played and started in all 37 games and averaged 13.5 points, 3.7 rebounds, 5.1 assists. Schumacher earned second-team All-WAC honors, where he led the conference in total assists (187) and assists per game (5.1). He scored 22 points with five rebounds and four assists in Seattle's 77–67 win over High Point in the 2024 CBI Championship.

== Professional career ==
=== Windy City Bulls (2024–2025) ===
After going undrafted in the 2024 NBA draft, Schumacher joined the Windy City Bulls training camp before making the opening night roster. He played in 24 games where he averaged 8.1 points, 2.5 rebounds and 3.1 assists per game.

=== Valley Suns (2025–2026) ===
On March 5, 2025, Schumacher was traded to the Valley Suns. He appeared in eight games, including two playoff games, where he averaged 12.5 points, 3.8 rebounds and 4.8 assists. Schumacher was named to the Phoenix Suns 2025 NBA Summer League squad. On September 4, 2025, he signed an Exhibit 10 contract with the Phoenix Suns. The following day, Schumacher was waived by the team. On October 27, 2025, he was announced as a member of the 2025-26 training camp roster for the Valley Suns. Schumacher finished his tenure with the Suns averaging 10.3 points, 2.9 rebounds and 3.0 assists, in 11 games.

=== Long Island Nets (2026–present) ===
On January 23, 2026, Schumacher was traded to the Long Island Nets for the returning player rights to Jordan Schakel and Long Island’s second round pick in the 2026 NBA G League Draft.

=== Lietkabelis Panevėžys (2026–present) ===
On July 1, 2026, he signed with Lietkabelis Panevėžys of the Lithuanian Basketball League (LKL) and the EuroCup.

== National team ==
In December 2025, Schumacher made his debut on the Swiss men's national team.

== Personal life ==
Schumacher is the nephew of J. J. Birden, who played in the National Football League as a wide receiver for seven seasons with the Kansas City Chiefs and Atlanta Falcons.
