= BC Tauragė =

Basketball team in Tauragė, Lithuania

- Leagues: Lithuanian Basketball League
- Founded: 2015; 11 years ago
- History: List: Fortūna–Agava (2015–2019) Tauragė (2019–present)
- Arena: Tauragė Arena
- Capacity: 1,800
- Location: Tauragė, Lithuania
- Team colors: White, green
- Head coach: Tomas Rinkevičius
- Website: bctaurage.lt

BC Tauragė is a Lithuanian professional basketball club based in Tauragė, Lithuania. The team competes in the Lithuanian Basketball League (LKL).

== History ==
In order to provide opportunities for local youth to play and improve, the Tauragė Fortūna–Agava club was established in 2015. In 2015–2016, the team, consisting exclusively of Tauragė residents, debuted in the third Lithuanian basketball league Regional Basketball League (RKL) B division. In the 2015–2016 season, during the awards ceremony held at the Government of Lithuania, the club was recognized for the best communication among all RKL league teams.

In 2017–2018 season, Tauragė Fortūna–Agava won third place in the RKL B division and received the right to move to a higher RKL A division.

Before the start of the 2019–2020 RKL season, the club changed its name from Tauragė Fortūna–Agava to BC Tauragė.

In 2020–2021 RKL season, BC Tauragė won bronze medals.

In 2024–2025 RKL season, BC Tauragė for the first time in the club's history played in RKL finals and won silver medals.

On 30 April 2026, Lithuanian Basketball League (LKL) board granted a participation license to BC Tauragė club for the 2026–27 LKL season. On 19 September 2026, BC Tauragė played its first-ever Lithuanian Basketball League home game at the Tauragė Arena and achieved a 95–90 victory versus the BC Jonava.

== Players ==
=== Current roster ===
BC Tauragė roster
Players
Coaches

Pos.	No.	Nat.	Name	Ht.	Wt.	Age
PG	00	(United States)	Hayes, Cam	1.91 m (6 ft 3 in)	84 kg (185 lb)	24 – 29 May 2002
G/F	1	(United States)	Blackmon Jr., James	1.93 m (6 ft 4 in)	91 kg (201 lb)	31 – 25 April 1995
PG	2	(Lithuania)	Bičkauskis, Dovis	1.91 m (6 ft 3 in)	88 kg (194 lb)	33 – 5 September 1993
G	3	(France)	Doualla, Daryl	1.95 m (6 ft 5 in)	90 kg (198 lb)	22 – 21 June 2004
F	7	(Lithuania)	Mineikis, Nojus	2.01 m (6 ft 7 in)	90 kg (198 lb)	25 – 29 November 2000
PG	8	(Lithuania)	Kariniauskas, Vaidas (C)	1.99 m (6 ft 6 in)	95 kg (209 lb)	32 – 16 November 1993
F	10	(Lithuania)	Kozys, Vitalijus	2.01 m (6 ft 7 in)	97 kg (214 lb)	27 – 30 April 1999
C	12	(Lithuania)	Griciūnas, Benas	2.10 m (6 ft 11 in)	106 kg (234 lb)	32 – 27 July 1994
C	16	(Belgium)	Bratanovic, Haris	2.09 m (6 ft 10 in)	110 kg (243 lb)	25 – 20 April 2001
F/C	17	(Ukraine)	Voinalovych, Andrii	2.05 m (6 ft 9 in)	93 kg (205 lb)	26 – 11 December 1999
G/F	24	(Lithuania)	Kiselevičius, Nojus	1.94 m (6 ft 4 in)	90 kg (198 lb)	20 – 18 March 2006
PF	27	(Lithuania)	Zikas, Kornelijus	2.02 m (6 ft 8 in)	92 kg (203 lb)	24 – 12 August 2002

Head coach

- (Lithuania) Tomas Rinkevičius

Assistant coach(es)

- (Lithuania) Kęstutis Naruševičius
- (Lithuania) Gytis Krugelevičius

Athletic trainer(s)

- (Lithuania) Lukas Leskauskas

Physiotherapist(s)

- (Lithuania) Dominykas Bručas

Legend

- (C) Team captain
- Injured

- Roster
Updated: November 2, 2026

=== Depth chart ===
Pos.	Starting 5	Bench 1	Bench 2
C	Benas Griciūnas	Haris Bratanovic
PF	Vitalijus Kozys	Andrii Voinalovych	Kornelijus Zikas
SF	Nojus Mineikis	Daryl Doualla
SG	James Blackmon Jr.	Nojus Kiselevičius
PG	Vaidas Kariniauskas	Cam Hayes	Dovis Bičkauskis

=== In ===
No.	Pos.	Nat.	Name	Moving from	
—	HC	(Lithuania)	Tomas Rinkevičius	BC Gargždai	(Lithuania)
00	PG	(United States)	Cam Hayes	SAM Massagno	(Switzerland)
1	G/F	(United States)	James Blackmon Jr.	Leuven Bears	(Belgium)
2	PG	(Lithuania)	Dovis Bičkauskis	Free agent	
3	G	(France)	Daryl Doualla	BC Gargždai (2024)	(Lithuania)
4	G	(United States)	Donovan Jackson	Astros de Jalisco	(Mexico)
7	F	(Lithuania)	Nojus Mineikis	BC Gargždai	(Lithuania)
8	PG	(Lithuania)	Vaidas Kariniauskas	Šiauliai	(Lithuania)
10	F	(Lithuania)	Vitalijus Kozys	Neptūnas Klaipėda	(Lithuania)
12	C	(Lithuania)	Benas Griciūnas	TSG GhostHawks	(Taiwan)
16	C	(Belgium)	Haris Bratanovic	Oostende	(Belgium)
17	F/C	(Ukraine)	Andrii Voinalovych	Sabah	(Azerbaijan)
27	PF	(Lithuania)	Kornelijus Zikas	LCC Moose Basketball	(Lithuania)

=== Out ===
No.	Pos.	Nat.	Name	Moving to
4	G	(United States)	Donovan Jackson	Free agent

== Season by season ==
Season	Tier	League	Pos.
2015–16	4	RKL B division	Round of 16
2016–17	4	RKL B division	Round of 16
2017–18	4	RKL B division	3rd
2018–19	3	RKL	Quarterfinals
2019–20	3	RKL	–^{1}
2020–21	3	RKL	3rd
2021–22	3	RKL	4th
2022–23	3	RKL	Quarterfinals
2023–24	3	RKL	4th
2024–25	3	RKL	2nd
2025–26	3	RKL	Quarterfinals

^1 Cancelled due to the COVID-19 pandemic in Europe.

== Head coaches ==
- (Lithuania) Tomas Rinkevičius: 2026–present
