= Experience of immigrant players to the NBA =

The initiation of immigrants in the National Basketball Association (NBA) has changed throughout the league's history and there have been many conversations on the experiences of immigrants in the league. In the NBA world, players born outside the United States, including in U.S. overseas territories, are considered and called international players. The first non-American player to play in the league was in 1946, and now more than 100 have joined seven decades later. According to Forbes, the NBA in 2021 was composed of 23% international players. This is a stark contrast from the percentage in 1992, which was only 5%. The number of international players has increased steadily from 35 in the 1999–2000 season to 80 in the 2006–2007 season, accounting for 18% of the team rosters.

Foreign-born athletes play an important role in professional basketball in America. They make up 23% of the rosters in the NBA, but are compensated for their participation in the league 20% less than native players. The NBA has one of the highest proportions of foreign-born players in professional sports, but there is a systemic issue of discrimination for foreign-born NBA players that stems from xenophobia, racism, language barriers, and cultural differences. The discrimination of foreign-born players in the NBA will be addressed through the demographics of the league, their accomplishments, stories of foreign players and their experience with discrimination, and the role of salaries in examining this topic.

== Demographics ==
According to the NBA, during the 2022–23 season, the NBA had a record 125 international players from 40 countries and six continents on opening-night rosters. To understand the influence foreign players have in the NBA, understanding the statistics of the population is essential.

- Canada is the most-represented country outside of the U.S., with 22 players in the NBA.
- Australia follows closely with 10 players, setting a record for the country.
- France has nine players in the NBA.
- Germany has six players in the NBA.
- Serbia has five players in the NBA.
- Nigeria and Turkey also have five players each.

=== European influence ===
- 64 European players are part of opening-night rosters.
- Among them, four members of the 2022-23 Kia All-NBA Team stand out:
  - Giannis Antetokounmpo (Milwaukee Bucks; Greece; ties to Nigeria): 2021 NBA champion and two-time Kia NBA Most Valuable Player (MVP).
  - Luka Dončić (Dallas Mavericks; Slovenia): Four-time NBA All-Star and All-NBA First Team member.
  - Nikola Jokić (Denver Nuggets; Serbia): 2023 NBA champion and three-time Kia NBA MVP.
  - Domantas Sabonis (Sacramento Kings; Lithuania): Three-time NBA All-Star.

=== African representation ===
- There are 15 players from Africa, including the 2022-23 Kia NBA MVP Joel Embiid (Philadelphia 76ers; Cameroon).

With the large population of foreign players in the NBA, there have been conversations about the lack of support for these players. For example, there has been a profound disregard for taking care of citizenship status' for foreign-born players which have decreased the proportion of immigrants, black, and Latino players from entering the league. The NBA helps get the players into America, but gaining a visa is difficult and involves an immigration lawyer. Many of these players do not have a wealthy support-system when they are drafted into the NBA, so navigating this journey alone with an attorney in a second language has been a difficult obstacle to overcome for these players. The lack of support for these players gaining a visa and/or citizenship is a sort of discrimination as it is an obstacle that native-born players do not have to deal with.

== Performance ==
The influx of international players has brought about a large success within the NBA. In the last 10 years, many of these international players have the highest rankings in the league and are winning awards.

Four international players have won the last seven Kia NBA MVP awards:

- Shai Gilgeous-Alexander (2024–25)
- Joel Embiid (2022–23)
- Nikola Jokić (2023-24, 2021–22, and 2020–21)
- Giannis Antetokounmpo (2019–20 and 2018–19)

No American has finished in the top 3 of NBA MVP voting since Stephen Curry finished 3rd in voting in 2020-21. In the four seasons since, from 2021-22 through the most recent season of 2024-25, all top 3 finishes in MVP voting have been international players, with Luka Doncic finishing in the top three in that span, in addition to the four international players listed above.

Fifteen international players in the NBA who are on the opening-night rosters have also been NBA All-Stars:

- Giannis Antetokounmpo, from Greece plays for the Milwaukee Bucks
- Luka Dončić, from Slovenia plays for the Dallas Mavericks
- Joel Embiid, from Cameroon plays for the Philadelphia 76ers
- Rudy Gobert, from France and plays for the Minnesota Timberwolves
- Shai Gilgeous-Alexander, from Canada and plays for the Oklahoma City Thunder
- Al Horford, from Dominican Republic and plays for the Golden State Warriors
- Kyrie Irving, from Australia and plays for the Dallas Mavericks
- Nikola Jokić, from Serbia plays for the Denver Nuggets
- Lauri Markkanen, from Finland and plays for the Utah Jazz
- Kristaps Porzingis, from Latvia and plays for the Golden State Warriors
- Domantas Sabonis, from Lithuania and plays for the Sacramento Kings
- Pascal Siakam, from Cameroon and plays for the Toronto Raptors
- Ben Simmons, from Australia and plays for the Brooklyn Nets
- Nikola Vučević, from Montenegro and plays for the Chicago Bulls
- Andrew Wiggins, from Canada and plays for the Golden State Warriors

International players have received significant recognition for their achievements in the NBA and have contributed to increasing the sport’s global visibility. Their participation has expanded international interest in basketball and has been associated with a growth in the global broadcast of NBA games.

NBA has used the players' accomplishments to its advantage and has gained a lot of popularity on the global scale due to their inclusion of players from all over the world. However, many of these players are described as "hyper-immature" if they complain about a call (e.g., a play or foul) or say something in their native language on the court. The hyper fixation on these players because of their accomplishments also puts them in a white, hot, spotlight where many of their actions and statements are criticized or analyzed, which is not as commonly seen for native players.

== Notable examples ==
=== Yao Ming ===
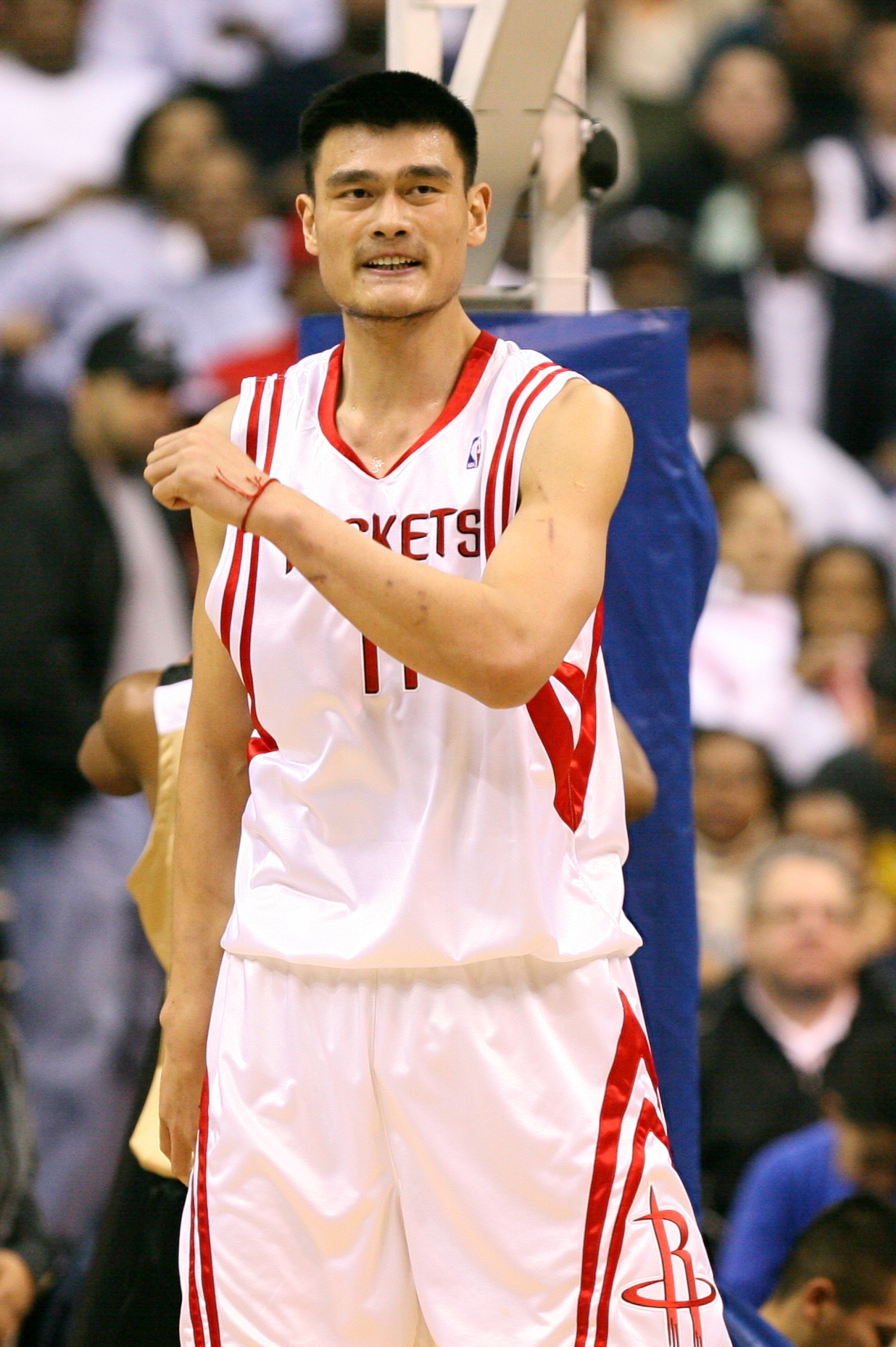
Yao Ming - Houston Rockets

Yao Ming is a former Chinese professional basketball player who played for the Houston Rockets. Ming stands at 7 feet 6 inches and was the tallest player in the NBA during his career. Ming was born in Shanghai, China and was selected by the Rockets as the first overall pick in the 2002 NBA draft. He reached the NBA playoffs four times and the Rockets won their first-round series in the 2009 postseason with his help. However, his experience in the NBA was plagued by discrimination. He suffered from hardships due to language barriers and racism for being Chinese. For example, his colleagues and the media mocked Yao Ming's Chinese. For example, Shaquille O'Neal made fun of Ming by saying, "Tell Yao Ming, 'Ching-chong-yang-wah-ah-soh.'" This was not the only time that Ming was taunted for his native language and his country of origin: during one of his games, fans of the opposing team squinted their eyes and yelled obscenities when he was playing for the Rockets. Many of these instances were brushed under the rug by the league. The NBA's decision to ignore many of these attacks and taunts on Ming's ethnicity, country of origin, and language reveals an inherent culture of discrimination in the league as they allowed for offensive and hurtful things to continue to be said as it may have affected their image if they dealt with the issue.

=== Giannis Antetokounmpo ===
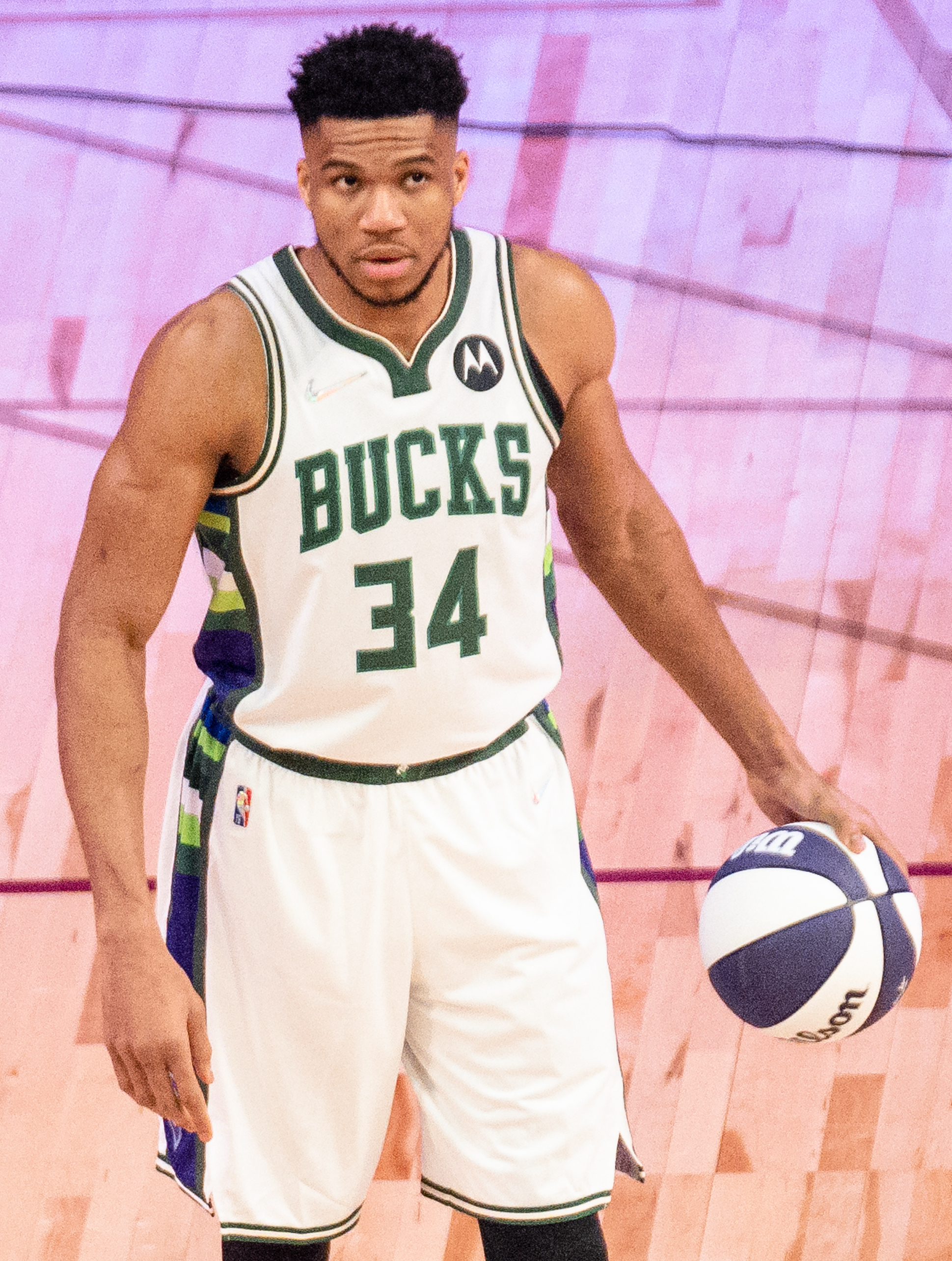
Giannis Antetokounmpo - Milwuakuee Bucks

Giannis Antetokounmpo is a Greek-Nigerian professional basketball player who currently plays for the Milwaukee Bucks in the NBA. He was given the nickname "Greek Freak" due to his size (6 feet 11 inches), speed, strength, and country of origin. Antetokounmpo was born in Athens, Greece to Nigerian immigrants who had no legal status in Greece. Due to his parents' lack of citizenship and Greek law, Giannis was not able to attain citizenship in his birth country. Despite facing challenges, he became a basketball prodigy as he has (as of July 2020), produced the most wins – a statistical measure of a player's value – during the 2019-20 NBA season. Although, Giannis has been very vocal about his experience and vulnerability to attacks by racist militants. Antetokounmpo has received threats of deportation to Nigeria and Greece and threats against his family. He only recently received his Greek citizenship. Additionally, Giannis has had to overcome language barriers and cultural differences. He has been made fun of for his English and has mentioned how American culture was a "significant adjustment for him." As an immigrant in the public eye, he has experienced a lot of racially and culturally motivated and xenophobic attacks. This is not a problem for many native-born players in the NBA as they as many are not attacked or criticized for their ability to speak English (their native language) or their citizenship status.

=== Others ===
Many other players have experienced discrimination while playing in the league. Players like Tito Horford, Al Horford, Nikola Jokic Deandre Ayton, Victor Wembanyama, and many other players in the NBA that are foreign-born have had experiences of discrimination on their respective teams, from the larger league practices, and from fans. The NBA culture that they are a part of has given these players many opportunities that they may not have had in their own countries, but it is not a "level playing field."

== Compensation of immigrant players ==
The increase in the salary of an NBA player caused by the success of the NBA.

The increase in foreign-born players has helped the NBA. The NBA has received an influx of top talent from all around the world and is increasing the league's appeal around the world. This has led to the NBA's success and popularity. However, the international players of this game are receiving discrimination in the form of unequal payment. International players who come from larger economies receive preferential labor market treatment than those that come from countries with a smaller or weaker economy. With that being said, it can be deduced that the foreign player's home country market helps in determining their salary which is beneficial for the NBA because they can pay the player less depending on where they're from. This unfairness is discrimination and unfairness based on a player's country of origin; something they could not change.

Additionally, the NBA can bargain more for the salary they pay their players when it comes to hiring foreign players. Since some of these foreign players come from developing countries or countries where basketball is not as popular of a sport, the NBA can negotiate lower-on-average salaries with international players than they would with players born in the country. In this case, international players are more inclined to accept the offer they are given by the NBA because the salary is most likely much higher than what their home countries or other basketball leagues will pay, even though their pay is much less than other players in the league.

The increase in foreign players in the NBA has helped players born in the United States because, with more players from multiple countries, the outreach of the NBA is global and has been key to the NBA's success. This has allowed for the average NBA player's salary to increase from $246,000 in 1982 and 1983 to $7.7 million in 2019–20. This has benefitted native-born players because, with the addition of foreign-born players, the NBA has gained a lot of global traction, creating more success and more money pouring into the league, which has increased their salaries. The average player salary has increased by 1,254% from 1983 to 2020.
