= Lithuania national basketball team at 2016 Olympic Games =

This page tracks the progress of the Lithuania men's national basketball team participating in 2016 Summer Olympics.

== Main roster ==
On June 8, the twenty candidates list was published, who were invited to the training camp. The list surprisingly did not included last year European vice-champion Lukas Lekavičius. On July 16, the final Olympic roster was announced, however two of the last candidates Artūras Milaknis and Vaidas Kariniauskas had to remain with the national team till the last friendly match in case if someone will get injured. Though, Milaknis left the team quickly. Following Ulanovas injury, Kariniauskas qualified into the final roster.

The following is the Lithuania roster in the men's basketball tournament of the 2016 Summer Olympics.

Lithuania men's national basketball team – 2016 Summer Olympics roster
Players
Coaches

Pos.	No.	Name	Age – Date of birth	Height	Club	Ctr.
PG	5	Mantas Kalnietis	29 – 6 September 1986	1.95 m (6 ft 5 in)	Olimpia Milano	(Italy)
G	7	Adas Juškevičius	27 – 3 January 1989	1.94 m (6 ft 4 in)	Lietuvos Rytas	(Lithuania)
SF	8	Jonas Mačiulis	31 – 10 February 1985	1.98 m (6 ft 6 in)	Real Madrid	(Spain)
SG	10	Renaldas Seibutis	31 – 23 July 1985	1.96 m (6 ft 5 in)	Žalgiris	(Lithuania)
F/C	11	Domantas Sabonis	20 – 3 May 1996	2.11 m (6 ft 11 in)	Gonzaga Bulldogs	(United States)
C	12	Antanas Kavaliauskas	31 – 19 September 1984	2.08 m (6 ft 10 in)	Lietuvos Rytas	(Lithuania)
PF	13	Paulius Jankūnas	32 – 29 April 1984	2.05 m (6 ft 9 in)	Žalgiris	(Lithuania)
C	15	Robertas Javtokas (C)	36 – 20 March 1980	2.11 m (6 ft 11 in)	Žalgiris	(Lithuania)
C	17	Jonas Valančiūnas	24 – 6 May 1992	2.13 m (7 ft 0 in)	Toronto Raptors	(Canada)
SF	19	Mindaugas Kuzminskas	26 – 19 October 1989	2.05 m (6 ft 9 in)	Unicaja Málaga	(Spain)
G/F	40	Marius Grigonis	22 – 26 April 1994	1.98 m (6 ft 6 in)	ICL Manresa	(Spain)
G	93	Vaidas Kariniauskas	22 – 16 November 1993	1.97 m (6 ft 6 in)	Kymis B.C.	(Greece)

Head coach

- (Lithuania) Jonas Kazlauskas

Assistant coach(es)

- (Lithuania) Darius Maskoliūnas
- (Lithuania) Gintaras Krapikas

Legend

- Club – describes last
  club before the tournament
- Age – describes age
  on 6 August 2016

=== Candidates that did not make it to the final team ===
#	Position	Player	Year of birth	Club	Reason	Date announced
31	Guard/Forward	Rokas Giedraitis	1990	(Lithuania) BC Šiauliai	Coaching decision	July 5
	Forward/Center	Donatas Motiejūnas	1990	(United States) Houston Rockets	Contract negotiations	July 14
18	Guard	Mindaugas Girdžiūnas	1989	(Lithuania) Neptūnas Klaipėda	Coaching decision	July 14
31	Guard/Forward	Deividas Gailius	1988	(Lithuania) Lietuvos rytas Vilnius	Coaching decision	July 14
21	Guard/Forward	Artūras Milaknis	1986	(Russia) UNICS Kazan	Coaching decision	July 16
93	Guard	Vaidas Kariniauskas	1993	(Greece) Kymi	Coaching decision	July 16
92	Forward	Edgaras Ulanovas	1992	(Lithuania) Žalgiris Kaunas	Injury, replaced by Kariniauskas	July 31

=== Depth chart ===
Pos.	Starting 5	Bench 1	Bench 2
C	Jonas Valančiūnas	Antanas Kavaliauskas	Robertas Javtokas
PF	Paulius Jankūnas	Domantas Sabonis
SF	Jonas Mačiulis	Mindaugas Kuzminskas
SG	Renaldas Seibutis	Marius Grigonis
PG	Mantas Kalnietis	Adas Juškevičius	Vaidas Kariniauskas

== Preparation matches ==
29 June 2016
18:30 EEST

Report (media)

Lithuania	88–58	New Zealand
Scoring by quarter: 28–18, 21–21, 17–14, 22–11
Pts: Ulanovas, Girdžiūnas 16; Rebs: Kavaliauskas 12; Asts: Juškevičius, Kariniauskas 4		Pts: Webster 16

Švyturys Arena, Lithuania

29 June 2016
18:30 EEST

Report (media)

Lithuania	81–56	Tunisia
Scoring by quarter: 16–9, 20–12, 32–16, 13–19
Pts: Juškevičius 17; Rebs: Javtokas, Girdžiūnas, Ulanovas, Kavaliauskas 5 Asts: Kariniauskas 5		Pts: Romdhane 15

Švyturys Arena, Lithuania

10 July 2016
18:30 EEST

Report (media)

Lithuania	84–53	Venezuela
Scoring by quarter: 28–14, 19–10, 18–13, 19–16
Pts: Juškevičius 15; Rebs: Kavaliauskas 6 Asts: Kalnietis, Jankūnas 4		Pts: Cox 12

Siemens Arena, Lithuania

12 July 2016
18:30 EEST

Report (media)

Lithuania	84–61	Netherlands
Scoring by quarter: 24–19, 18–6, 24–22, 18–14
Pts: Valančiūnas 16; Rebs: Sabonis 12; Asts: Kariniauskas 5		Pts: Kok 14

Alytus Arena, Lithuania

14 July 2016
18:30 EEST

Report (media)

Lithuania	84–51	Belarus
Scoring by quarter: 21-9, 24-20, 23-16, 16-6
Pts: Kuzminskas 14; Rebs: Sabonis 13; Asts: Kariniauskas 4		Pts: Liutyč 13

Kėdainiai Arena, Lithuania

18 July 2016
18:30 EEST

Report (media)

Lithuania	87–83 (OT)	(Spain)
Scoring by quarter: 19-20, 15-12, 20-25, 18-15, Overtime: 15-11
Pts: Kalnietis 24; Rebs: Valančiūnas 10; Asts: Kalnietis 5		Pts: Rodríguez 14

Kaunas, Lithuania

21 July 2016
21:45 EEST

Report (media)

Spain	76–78	Lithuania
Scoring by quarter: 23-15, 16-24, 20-23, 17-16
Pts: Llull 12		Pts: Valančiūnas, Kuzminskas 15; Rebs: Valančiūnas 7 Asts: Kariniauskas 5

Málaga, Spain

25 July 2016

Report (media)

Australia	0–0 (cancelled)	Lithuania

Buenos Aires, Argentina

28 July 2016
03:00 EEST

Report (media)

Argentina	86–85 (OT)	Lithuania
Scoring by quarter: 10-7, 16-23, 19-18, 23-20, Overtime: 10-10, 8-7
Pts: Scola 17		Pts: Jankūnas 17; Rebs: Sabonis 11; Asts: Juškevičius 3

Buenos Aires, Argentina

30 July 2016
18:00 EEST

Report (media)

Australia	68–81	Lithuania
Scoring by quarter: 11-21, 21-20, 14-21, 22-19
Pts: Ingles 16; Rebs: Baynes 7		Pts: Valančiūnas 19; Rebs: Valančiūnas 8 Asts: Kalnietis 7

São Paulo, Brazil

31 July 2016

Report

Brasil (Brazil)	64–62	Lithuania
Scoring by quarter: 24-19, 12-19, 11-12, 17-12
Pts: Marquinhos 14; Rebs: Nenê, Lima 7 Asts: Huertas 4		Pts: Kalnietis 13; Rebs: Valančiūnas 9 Asts: Kalnietis, Seibutis, Juškevičius, Mačiulis, Kariniauskas 2

São Paulo, Brazil

== 2016 Summer Olympics ==
=== Group phase ===
Lithuania was drawn into the Group B.

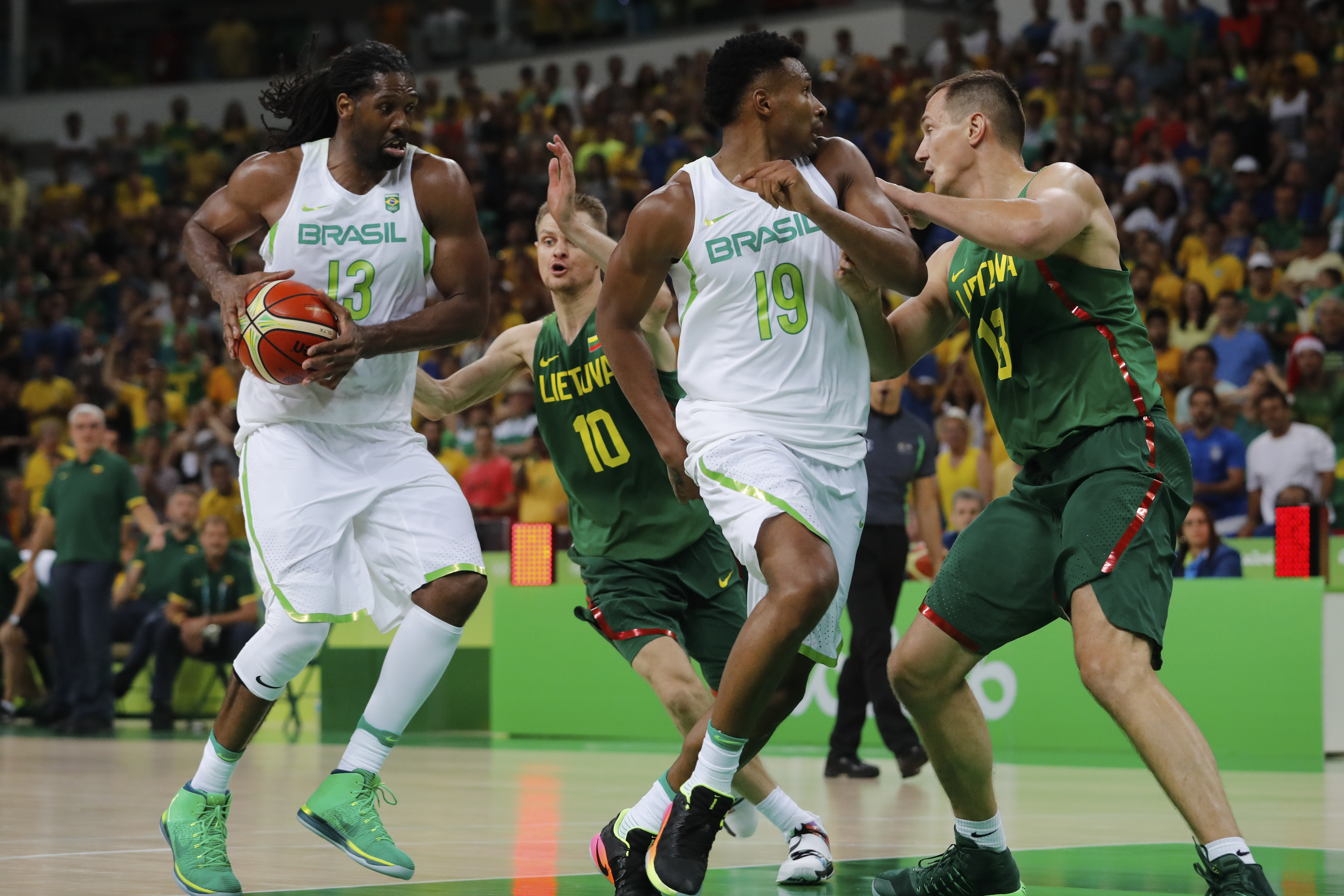
Scene from the Lithuania-Brazil game during the group phase.

Pos	Team	Pld	W	L	PF	PA	PD	Pts	Qualification
1	Croatia	5	3	2	400	407	−7	8 (Note: In games among the four teams at 3–2, Croatia and Spain were 2–1 while Argentina and Lithuania were 1–2. Croatia beat Spain 72–70, and Lithuania beat Argentina 81–73.)	Quarterfinals
2	Spain	5	3	2	432	357	+75	8	Quarterfinals
3	Lithuania	5	3	2	392	428	−36	8	Quarterfinals
4	Argentina	5	3	2	441	428	+13	8	Quarterfinals
5	Brazil (H)	5	2	3	411	407	+4	7	
6	Nigeria	5	1	4	392	441	−49	6	

Source: FIBA
Rules for classification: 1) points; 2) head-to-head points; 3) head-to-head points difference; 4) head-to-head number of points scored.
(H) Hosts
Notes:

All times are local (UTC−3).

7 August 2016
14:15

Boxscore

Brazil	76–82	Lithuania
Scoring by quarter: 17–27, 12–31, 23–12, 24–12
Pts: Barbosa 21; Rebs: Nenê 8 Asts: Huertas 3		Pts: Kalnietis 16; Rebs: Jankūnas 7 Asts: Kalnietis 8

Carioca Arena 1, Rio de Janeiro
Attendance: 7,990
Referees: Eddie Viator (FRA), Steven Anderson (USA), José Reyes (MEX)

9 August 2016
19:00

Boxscore

Lithuania	89–80	Nigeria
Scoring by quarter: 13–16, 23–25, 29–13, 24–26
Pts: Mačiulis 21; Rebs: Sabonis 7 Asts: Kalnietis 12		Pts: Diogu 19; Rebs: Diogu 7 Asts: Ere 4

Carioca Arena 1, Rio de Janeiro
Attendance: 5,785
Referees: Stephen Seibel (CAN), Robert Lottermoser (GER), Anne Panther (GER)

11 August 2016
22:30

Boxscore

Lithuania	81–73	Argentina
Scoring by quarter: 16–15, 14–12, 27–22, 24–24
Pts: Kuzminskas 23; Rebs: Valančiūnas 10; Asts: Kalnietis 7		Pts: Ginóbili 22; Rebs: Nocioni, Scola 7 Asts: Scola 4

Carioca Arena 1, Rio de Janeiro
Attendance: 11,093
Referees: Ilija Belošević (SRB), Damir Javor (SLO), Eddie Viator (FRA)

13 August 2016
19:00

Boxscore

Spain	109–59	Lithuania
Scoring by quarter: 26–11, 22–18, 36–16, 25–14
Pts: Gasol 23; Rebs: Reyes 9 Asts: Llull 6		Pts: Kuzminskas 17; Rebs: Valančiūnas 10; Asts: Mačiulis 2

Carioca Arena 1, Rio de Janeiro
Attendance: 11,045
Referees: Ilija Belošević (SRB), Roberto Vázquez (PUR), Oļegs Latiševs (LAT)

15 August 2016
22:30

Boxscore

Lithuania	81–90	Croatia
Scoring by quarter: 21–13, 20–34, 14–28, 26–15
Pts: Kalnietis 26; Rebs: Valančiūnas 6 Asts: Kalnietis 11		Pts: Bogdanović 22; Rebs: Simon 10; Asts: Simon 6

Carioca Arena 1, Rio de Janeiro
Attendance: 7,809
Referees: Borys Ryzhyk (UKR), Steven Anderson (USA), Piotr Pastusiak (POL)

=== Quarter-final ===
17 August 2016
11:00

Boxscore

Australia	90–64	Lithuania
Scoring by quarter: 26–17, 22–13, 22–13, 20–21
Pts: Mills 24; Rebs: Bogut 7 Asts: Bogut 6		Pts: Kalnietis, Kavaliauskas 12; Rebs: Valančiūnas 8 Asts: Kalnietis 5

Carioca Arena 1, Rio de Janeiro
Attendance: 9,348
Referees: Steven Anderson (USA), Stephen Seibel (CAN), Piotr Pastusiak (POL)
