= List of NBA annual rebounding leaders =

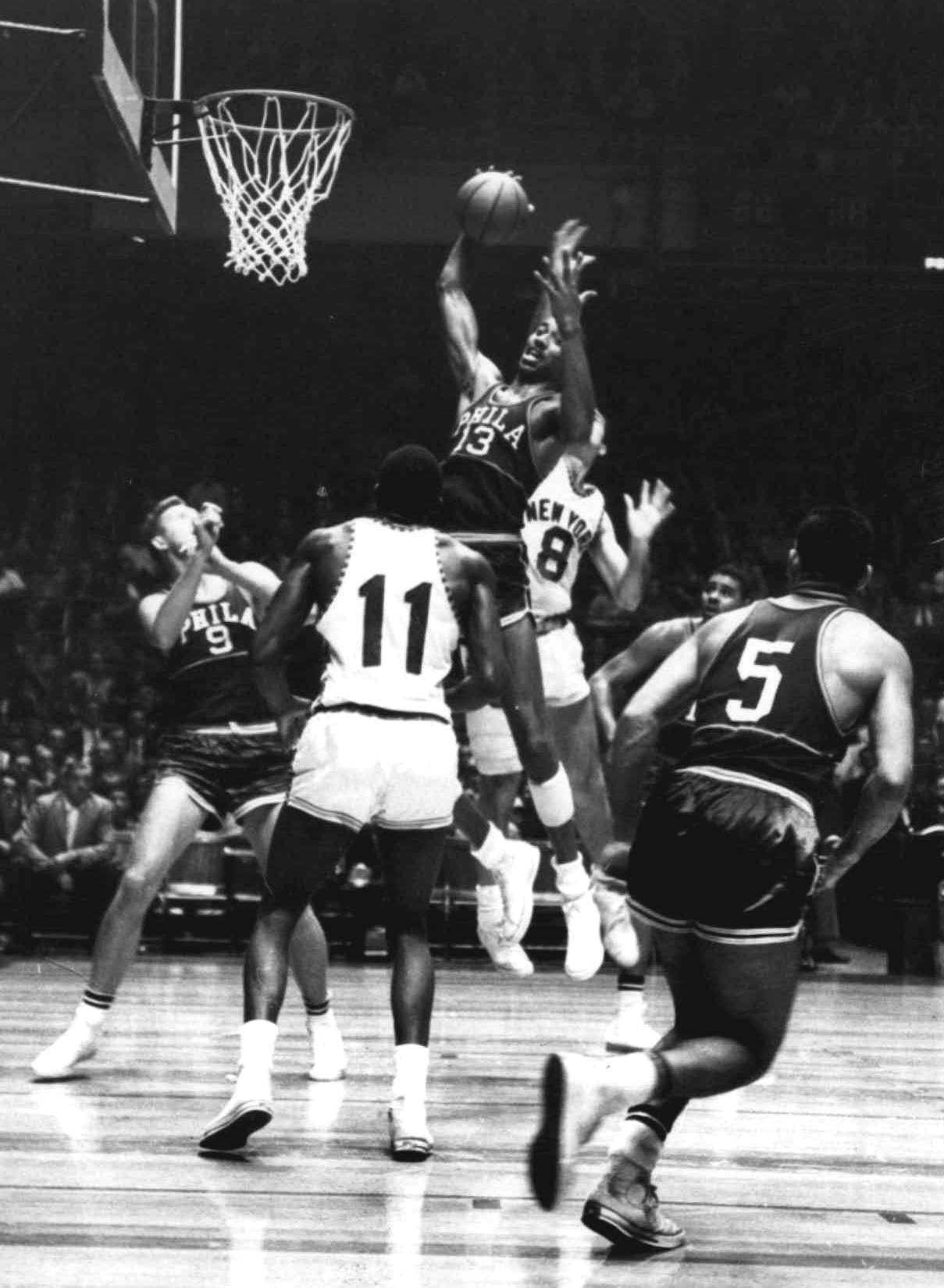
Wilt Chamberlain won a record 11 rebounding titles in his career.

In basketball, a rebound is the act of gaining possession of the ball after a missed field goal or free throw. An offensive rebound occurs when a player recovers the ball after their own or a teammate's missed shot attempt, while a defensive rebound occurs when a player recovers the ball after an opponent's missed shot attempt. The National Basketball Association's (NBA) rebounding title is awarded to the player with the highest rebounds per game average in a given season. It was first recognized in the 1950–51 season, which was the second season after the league was created in 1949 by merger of the 3-year-old BAA and 12-year-old NBL. Players who earned rebounding titles before the 1973–74 season did not record any offensive or defensive rebounds because statistics on them were not recorded before that season. To qualify for the rebounding title, a player must appear in at least 58 games (out of 82). However, a player who appears in fewer than 58 games may qualify as annual rebounding leader if his rebound total would have given him the greatest average, had he appeared in 58 games. This has been the requirement since the 2013–14 season. The rebounding title was originally determined by rebound total through the 1968–69 season, after which rebounds per game was used to determine the leader instead.

Wilt Chamberlain holds the all-time records for total rebounds (2,149) and rebounds per game (27.2) in a season; both records were achieved in the 1960–61 season. He also holds the rookie records for total rebounds, with 1,941 in the 1959–60 season. Among active players, Andre Drummond has the highest season rebound total (1,247) and the highest season rebounding average (15.99), both achieved in the 2017–18 season. At 22 years, 130 days, Dwight Howard is the youngest rebounding leader in NBA history (achieved in the 2007–08 season), while Dennis Rodman is the oldest at 36 years, 341 days (achieved in the 1997–98 season).

Chamberlain won the most rebounding titles in his career, with 11. Dennis Rodman won a record seven consecutive rebounding titles. Moses Malone won six rebounding titles. Howard won five rebounding titles. Kevin Garnett and Bill Russell won four rebounding titles each. Drummond has won four rebounding titles. Elvin Hayes, Dikembe Mutombo, Hakeem Olajuwon, Ben Wallace, DeAndre Jordan, and Domantas Sabonis are the only other players who have won the title multiple times. Six players have won the rebounding title and the NBA championship in the same season: George Mikan in 1953 with the Minneapolis Lakers; Russell in 1959, 1964, and 1965 with the Boston Celtics; Chamberlain in 1967 and 1972 with the Philadelphia 76ers and the Los Angeles Lakers, respectively; Bill Walton in 1977 with the Portland Trail Blazers; Malone in 1983 with the 76ers; and Rodman in 1996, 1997, and 1998 with the Chicago Bulls.

== Key ==
| ^ | | Denotes player who is still active in the NBA | | | |
| * | | Inducted into the Naismith Memorial Basketball Hall of Fame | | | |
| § | | 1st time eligible for Hall of Fame in 2025 | | | |
| ‡ | | Denotes player who won the Most Valuable Player award that year | | | |
| Player (X) | | Denotes the number of times the player had been the rebounding leader up to and including that season | | | |
| G | Guard | F | Forward | C | Center |

== Annual leaders ==
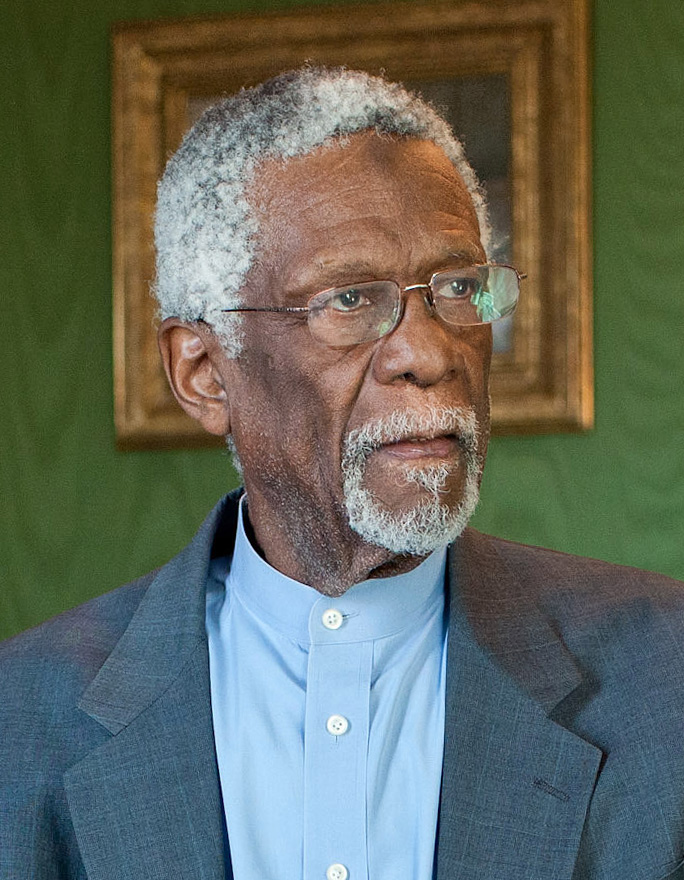
Bill Russell was the rebounding leader from 1958 to 1959 and from 1964 to 1965.

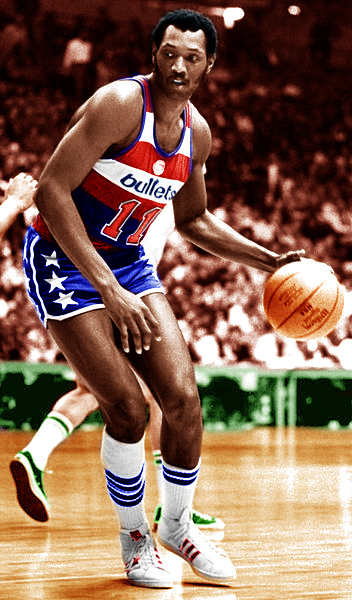
Elvin Hayes was the rebounding leader in 1970 and 1974.

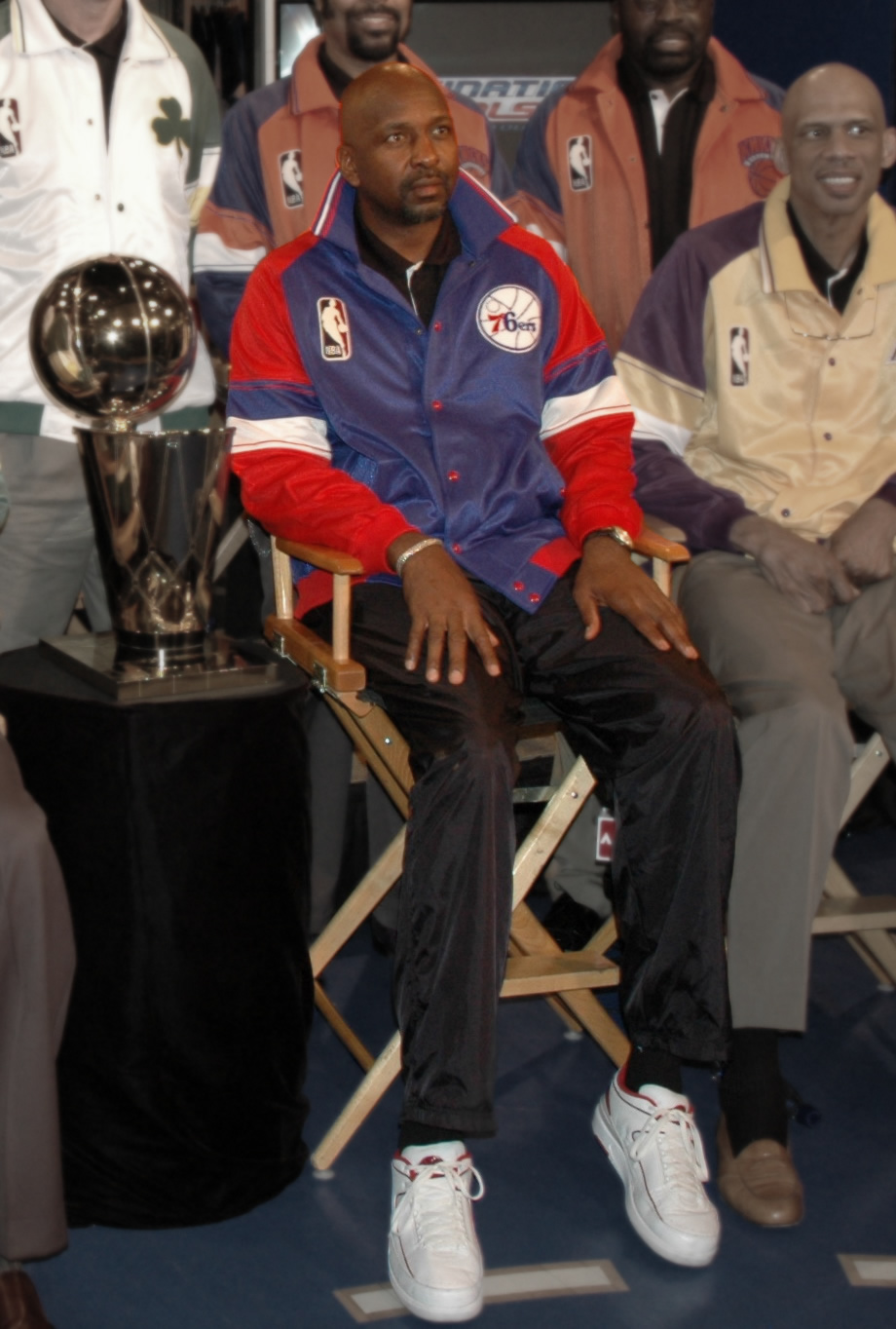
Moses Malone was the rebounding leader in 1979 and from 1981 to 1985.

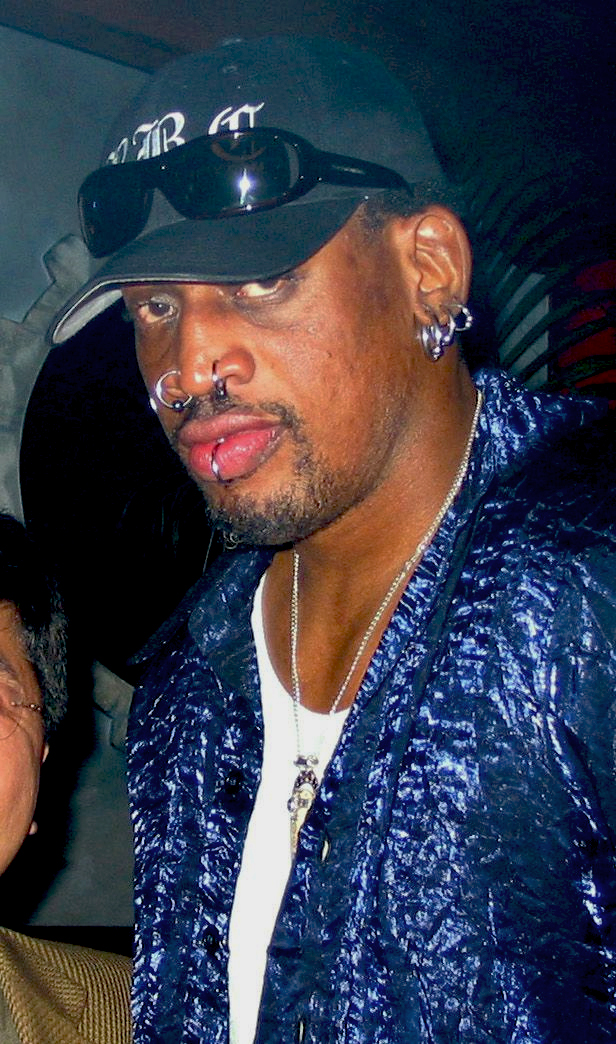
Dennis Rodman was the rebounding leader from 1991 to 1998.

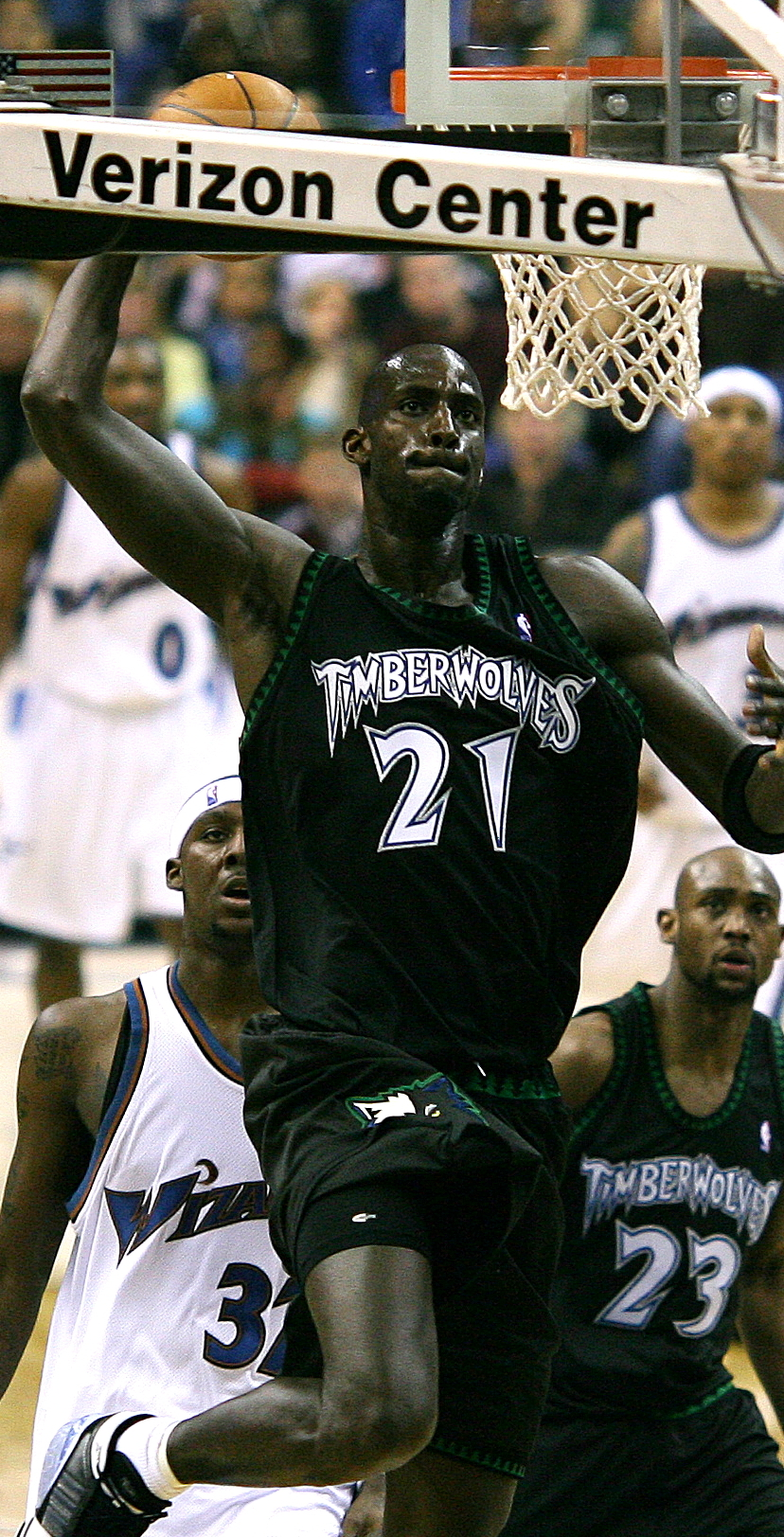
Kevin Garnett was the rebounding leader from 2004 to 2007.

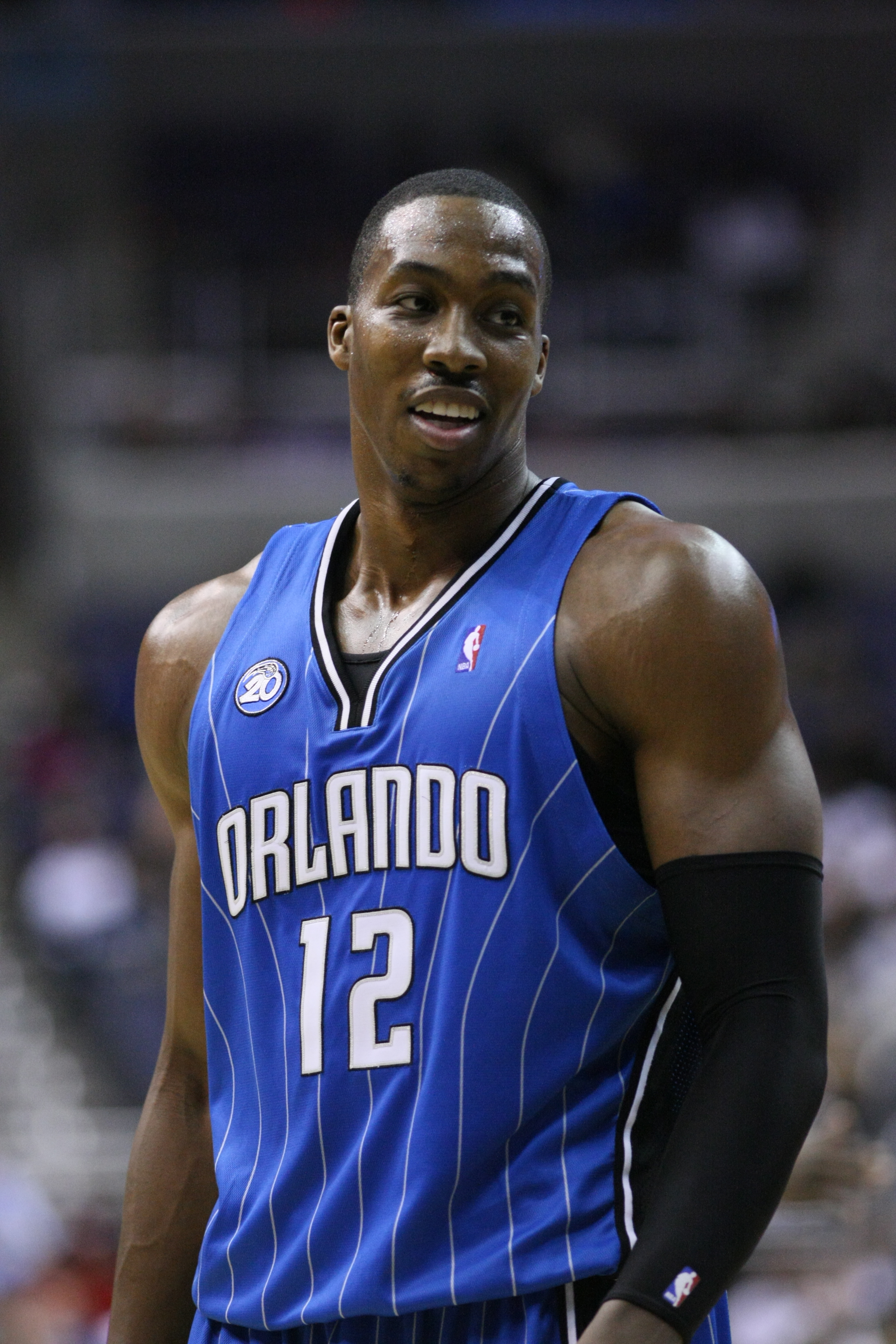
Dwight Howard was the rebounding leader from 2008 to 2010 and from 2012 to 2013.

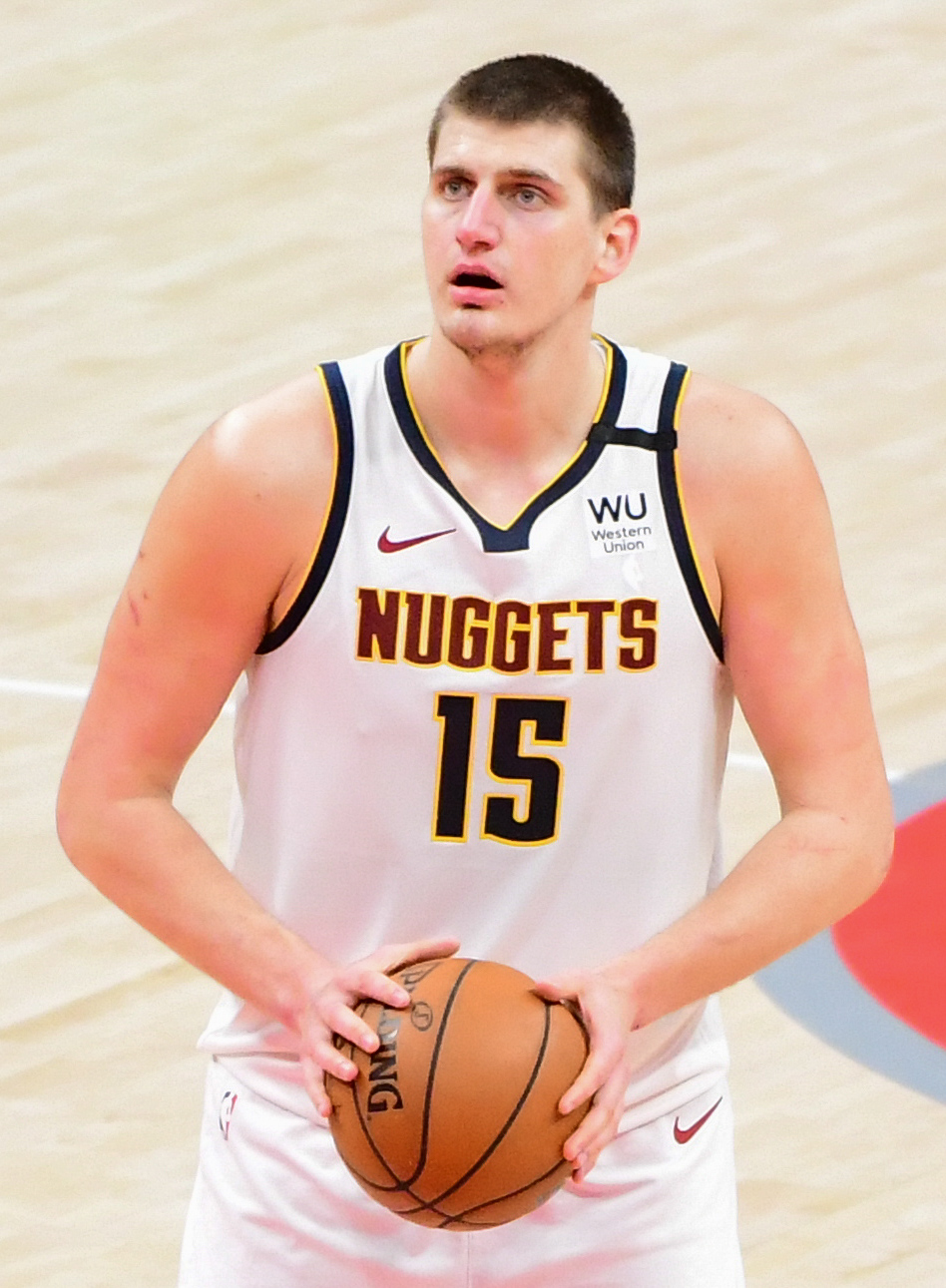
Nikola Jokić is the reigning rebounding leader in the NBA

| Season | Player | Pos. (Note: The player's primary position is listed first.) | Team | Games played | Offensive rebounds | Defensive rebounds | Total rebounds | Rebounds per game | Ref |
|---|---|---|---|---|---|---|---|---|---|
| 1950–51 | Dolph Schayes* | F/C | Syracuse Nationals | 66 | — | — | 1,080 | 16.36 | |
| 1951–52 | Larry Foust | C | Fort Wayne Pistons | 66 | — | — | 880 | 13.33 | |
| 1951–52 | Mel Hutchins | C | Milwaukee Hawks | 66 | — | — | 880 | 13.33 | |
| 1952–53 | George Mikan* | C | Minneapolis Lakers | 70 | — | — | 1,007 | 14.39 | |
| 1953–54 | Harry Gallatin* | F | New York Knicks | 72 | — | — | 1,098 | 15.25 | |
| 1954–55 | Neil Johnston* | C | Philadelphia Warriors | 72 | — | — | 1,085 | 15.07 | |
| 1955–56 ‡ | Bob Pettit* | C | St. Louis Hawks | 72 | — | — | 1,164 | 16.17 | |
| 1956–57 | Maurice Stokes* | F | Rochester Royals | 72 | — | — | 1,256 | 17.44 | |
| 1957–58 ‡ | Bill Russell* | C | Boston Celtics | 69 | — | — | 1,564 | 22.67 | |
| 1958–59 | Bill Russell* (2) | C | Boston Celtics | 70 | — | — | 1,612 | 23.03 | |
| 1959–60 ‡ | Wilt Chamberlain* (Note: Wilt Chamberlain holds the all-time rookie record for total rebounds.) | C | Philadelphia Warriors | 72 | — | — | 1,941 | 26.96 | |
| 1960–61 | Wilt Chamberlain* (2) (Note: Wilt Chamberlain holds the all-time record for total rebounds and rebounds per game in a single season.) | C | Philadelphia Warriors | 79 | — | — | 2,149 | 27.20 | |
| 1961–62 | Wilt Chamberlain* (3) | C | Philadelphia Warriors | 80 | — | — | 2,052 | 25.65 | |
| 1962–63 | Wilt Chamberlain* (4) | C | San Francisco Warriors | 80 | — | — | 1,946 | 24.32 | |
| 1963–64 | Bill Russell* (3) | C | Boston Celtics | 78 | — | — | 1,930 | 24.74 | |
| 1964–65 ‡ | Bill Russell* (4) | C | Boston Celtics | 78 | — | — | 1,878 | 24.08 | |
| 1965–66 ‡ | Wilt Chamberlain* (5) | C | Philadelphia 76ers | 79 | — | — | 1,943 | 24.59 | |
| 1966–67 ‡ | Wilt Chamberlain* (6) | C | Philadelphia 76ers | 81 | — | — | 1,957 | 24.16 | |
| 1967–68 ‡ | Wilt Chamberlain* (7) | C | Philadelphia 76ers | 82 | — | — | 1,952 | 23.80 | |
| 1968–69 | Wilt Chamberlain* (8) | C | Los Angeles Lakers | 81 | — | — | 1,712 | 21.14 | |
| 1969–70 | Elvin Hayes* | C | San Diego Rockets | 82 | — | — | 1,386 | 16.90 | |
| 1970–71 | Wilt Chamberlain* (9) | C | Los Angeles Lakers | 82 | — | — | 1,493 | 18.21 | |
| 1971–72 | Wilt Chamberlain* (10) | C | Los Angeles Lakers | 82 | — | — | 1,572 | 19.17 | |
| 1972–73 | Wilt Chamberlain* (11) | C | Los Angeles Lakers | 82 | — | — | 1,526 | 18.61 | |
| 1973–74 | Elvin Hayes* (2) | F | Capital Bullets | 81 | 354 | 1,109 | 1,463 | 18.06 | |
| 1974–75 | Wes Unseld* (Note: In the 1974–75 season, Bob McAdoo and Sam Lacey both had higher rebound totals (1,155 and 1,149 respectively) but they ranked fourth and third in rebounding average (14.1 and 14.2 respectively).) | C | Washington Bullets | 73 | 318 | 759 | 1,077 | 14.75 | |
| 1975–76 ‡ | Kareem Abdul-Jabbar* | C | Los Angeles Lakers | 82 | 272 | 1,111 | 1,383 | 16.87 | |
| 1976–77 | Bill Walton* (Note: In the 1976–77 season, Kareem Abdul-Jabbar, Moses Malone, Artis Gilmore and Elvin Hayes all had higher rebound total (1,090, 1,072, 1,070 and 1,029 respectively) but they ranked second, third, fourth and sixth in rebounding average (13.3, 13.1, 13.0 and 12.5 respectively).) | C | Portland Trail Blazers | 65 | 211 | 723 | 934 | 14.37 | |
| 1977–78 | Truck Robinson | F | New Orleans Jazz | 82 | 298 | 990 | 1,288 | 15.71 | |
| 1978–79 ‡ | Moses Malone* | C | Houston Rockets | 82 | 587 | 857 | 1,444 | 17.61 | |
| 1979–80 | Swen Nater | C | San Diego Clippers | 81 | 352 | 864 | 1,216 | 15.01 | |
| 1980–81 | Moses Malone* (2) | C | Houston Rockets | 80 | 474 | 706 | 1,180 | 14.75 | |
| 1981–82 ‡ | Moses Malone* (3) | C | Houston Rockets | 81 | 558 | 630 | 1,188 | 14.67 | |
| 1982–83 ‡ | Moses Malone* (4) | C | Philadelphia 76ers | 78 | 445 | 749 | 1,194 | 15.31 | |
| 1983–84 | Moses Malone* (5) (Note: In the 1983–84 season, Bill Laimbeer and Buck Williams both had higher rebound totals (1,003 and 1,000 respectively) but they ranked fourth and second in rebounding average (12.2 and 12.3 respectively).) | C | Philadelphia 76ers | 71 | 352 | 598 | 950 | 13.38 | |
| 1984–85 | Moses Malone* (6) | C | Philadelphia 76ers | 79 | 385 | 646 | 1,031 | 13.05 | |
| 1985–86 | Bill Laimbeer | C | Detroit Pistons | 82 | 305 | 770 | 1,075 | 13.11 | |
| 1986–87 | Charles Barkley* (Note: In the 1986–87 season, Charles Oakley and Buck Williams both had higher rebound totals (1,074 and 1,023 respectively) but they ranked second to third in rebounding average (13.1 and 12.5 respectively).) | F | Philadelphia 76ers | 68 | 390 | 604 | 994 | 14.62 | |
| 1987–88 | Michael Cage (Note: In the 1987–88 season, Charles Oakley had the highest rebound total (1,066) but was second in rebounding average (13.0).) | F | Los Angeles Clippers | 72 | 371 | 567 | 938 | 13.03 | |
| 1988–89 | Hakeem Olajuwon* (Note: When Olajuwon arrived in the United States, the University of Houston incorrectly spelled his first name "Akeem". He used that spelling until March 9, 1991, when he announced that he would add an H.) | C | Houston Rockets | 82 | 338 | 767 | 1,105 | 13.48 | |
| 1989–90 | Hakeem Olajuwon* (2) | C | Houston Rockets | 82 | 299 | 850 | 1,149 | 14.01 | |
| 1990–91 | David Robinson* | C | San Antonio Spurs | 82 | 335 | 728 | 1,063 | 12.96 | |
| 1991–92 | Dennis Rodman* | F | Detroit Pistons | 82 | 523 | 1,007 | 1,530 | 18.66 | |
| 1992–93 | Dennis Rodman* (2) | F | Detroit Pistons | 62 | 367 | 765 | 1,132 | 18.26 | |
| 1993–94 | Dennis Rodman* (3) | F | San Antonio Spurs | 79 | 453 | 914 | 1,367 | 17.30 | |
| 1994–95 | Dennis Rodman* (4) (Note: In the 1994–95 season, Dennis Rodman had only played in 49 games and ranked tenth in rebound total. Dikembe Mutombo had the highest total (1,029).) | F | San Antonio Spurs | 49 | 274 | 549 | 823 | 16.80 | |
| 1995–96 | Dennis Rodman* (5) (Note: In the 1995–96 season, David Robinson had the highest rebound total (1,000) but was second in rebounding average (12.2).) | F | Chicago Bulls | 64 | 356 | 596 | 952 | 14.88 | |
| 1996–97 | Dennis Rodman* (6) (Note: In the 1996–97 season, Dikembe Mutombo and Ervin Johnson both had higher rebound totals (929 and 913 respectively) but they ranked second and fourth in rebounding average (11.6 and 11.1 respectively).) | F | Chicago Bulls | 55 | 320 | 563 | 883 | 16.05 | |
| 1997–98 | Dennis Rodman* (7) | F | Chicago Bulls | 80 | 421 | 780 | 1,201 | 15.01 | |
| 1998–99 (Note: The 1998–99 season was shortened to 50 games due to the league's lockout. The qualification of this season's rebounding title is to appear in at least 43 games (out of 50) or to have at least 488 rebounds.) | Chris Webber* (Note: In the 1998–99 season, Dikembe Mutombo, Danny Fortson and Tim Duncan all had higher rebound totals (610, 581, and 571 respectively) but they ranked third to fifth in rebounding average (12.2, 11.6 and 11.4 respectively).) | F | Sacramento Kings | 42 | 149 | 396 | 545 | 12.98 | |
| 1999–00 | Dikembe Mutombo* | C | Atlanta Hawks | 82 | 304 | 853 | 1,157 | 14.11 | |
| 2000–01 | Dikembe Mutombo* (2) (Note: In the 2000–01 season, Ben Wallace had the highest rebound total (1,052) but was second in rebounding average (13.2).) | C | Atlanta Hawks; Philadelphia 76ers | 75 | 307 | 708 | 1,015 | 13.53 | |
| 2001–02 | Ben Wallace* (Note: In the 2001–02 season, Tim Duncan had the highest rebound total (1,042) but was second in rebounding average (12.7).) | C | Detroit Pistons | 80 | 318 | 721 | 1,039 | 12.99 | |
| 2002–03 | Ben Wallace* (2) | C | Detroit Pistons | 73 | 293 | 833 | 1,126 | 15.42 | |
| 2003–04 ‡ | Kevin Garnett* | F | Minnesota Timberwolves | 82 | 245 | 894 | 1,139 | 13.89 | |
| 2004–05 | Kevin Garnett* (2) | F | Minnesota Timberwolves | 82 | 247 | 861 | 1,108 | 13.51 | |
| 2005–06 | Kevin Garnett* (3) (Note: In the 2005–06 season, Dwight Howard had the highest rebound total (1,022) but was second in rebounding average (12.5).) | F | Minnesota Timberwolves | 76 | 214 | 752 | 966 | 12.71 | |
| 2006–07 | Kevin Garnett* (4) (Note: In the 2006–07 season, Dwight Howard had the highest rebound total (1,008) but was third in rebounding average (12.3).) | F | Minnesota Timberwolves | 76 | 183 | 792 | 975 | 12.83 | |
| 2007–08 | Dwight Howard* | C | Orlando Magic | 82 | 279 | 882 | 1,161 | 14.16 | |
| 2008–09 | Dwight Howard* (2) | C | Orlando Magic | 79 | 336 | 757 | 1,093 | 13.84 | |
| 2009–10 | Dwight Howard* (3) | C | Orlando Magic | 82 | 284 | 798 | 1,082 | 13.20 | |
| 2010–11 | Kevin Love^ | F | Minnesota Timberwolves | 73 | 330 | 782 | 1,112 | 15.23 | |
| 2011–12 (Note: The 2011–12 season was shortened to 66 games due to the league's lockout. The qualification of this season's rebounding title is to appear in at least 56 games (out of 66) or to have at least 644 rebounds.) | Dwight Howard* (4) | C | Orlando Magic | 54 | 200 | 585 | 785 | 14.54 | |
| 2012–13 | Dwight Howard* (5) (Note: In the 2012–13 season, Ömer Aşık had the highest rebound total (956) but was third in rebounding average (11.7).) | C | Los Angeles Lakers | 76 | 251 | 694 | 945 | 12.43 | |
| 2013–14 | DeAndre Jordan^ | C | Los Angeles Clippers | 82 | 331 | 783 | 1,114 | 13.59 | |
| 2014–15 | DeAndre Jordan^ (2) | C | Los Angeles Clippers | 82 | 397 | 829 | 1,226 | 14.95 | |
| 2015–16 | Andre Drummond^ | C | Detroit Pistons | 81 | 395 | 803 | 1,198 | 14.79 | |
| 2016–17 | Hassan Whiteside | C | Miami Heat | 77 | 293 | 795 | 1,088 | 14.13 | |
| 2017–18 | Andre Drummond^ (2) | C | Detroit Pistons | 78 | 399 | 848 | 1,247 | 15.99 | |
| 2018–19 | Andre Drummond^ (3) | C | Detroit Pistons | 79 | 423 | 809 | 1,232 | 15.59 | |
| 2019–20 | Andre Drummond^ (4) | C | Detroit Pistons; Cleveland Cavaliers | 57 | 250 | 614 | 864 | 15.16 | |
| 2020–21 | Clint Capela^ | C | Atlanta Hawks | 63 | 297 | 606 | 903 | 14.33 | |
| 2021–22 | Rudy Gobert^ | C | Utah Jazz | 66 | 241 | 727 | 968 | 14.67 | |
| 2022–23 | Domantas Sabonis^ | C | Sacramento Kings | 79 | 251 | 722 | 973 | 12.32 | |
| 2023–24 | Domantas Sabonis^ (2) | C | Sacramento Kings | 82 | 294 | 826 | 1,120 | 13.66 | |
| 2024–25 | Domantas Sabonis^ (3) | C | Sacramento Kings | 70 | 267 | 705 | 972 | 13.89 | |
| 2025–26 | Nikola Jokić^ | C | Denver Nuggets | 65 | 192 | 644 | 836 | 12.86 | |

== Multiple-time leaders ==
| Rank | Player | Team | Times leader | Years |
|---|---|---|---|---|
| 1 | Wilt Chamberlain | Philadelphia Warriors/San Francisco Warriors (4) / Philadelphia 76ers (3) / Los Angeles Lakers (4) | 11 | 1960, 1961, 1962, 1963, 1966, 1967, 1968, 1969, 1971, 1972, 1973 |
| 2 | Dennis Rodman | Detroit Pistons (2) / San Antonio Spurs (2) / Chicago Bulls (3) | 7 | 1992, 1993, 1994, 1995, 1996, 1997, 1998 |
| 3 | Moses Malone | Houston Rockets (3) / Philadelphia 76ers (3) | 6 | 1979, 1981, 1982, 1983, 1984, 1985 |
| 4 | Dwight Howard | Orlando Magic (4) / Los Angeles Lakers (1) | 5 | 2008, 2009, 2010, 2012, 2013 |
| 5 | Andre Drummond | Detroit Pistons (3) / Cleveland Cavaliers (1) | 4 | 2016, 2018, 2019, 2020 |
| 5 | Kevin Garnett | Minnesota Timberwolves | 4 | 2004, 2005, 2006, 2007 |
| 5 | Bill Russell | Boston Celtics | 4 | 1958, 1959, 1964, 1965 |
| 8 | Domantas Sabonis | Sacramento Kings | 3 | 2023, 2024, 2025 |
| 9 | Elvin Hayes | San Diego Rockets (1) / Capital Bullets (1) | 2 | 1970, 1974 |
| 9 | DeAndre Jordan | Los Angeles Clippers | 2 | 2014, 2015 |
| 9 | Dikembe Mutombo | Atlanta Hawks (1) / Philadelphia 76ers (1) | 2 | 2000, 2001 |
| 9 | Hakeem Olajuwon | Houston Rockets | 2 | 1989, 1990 |
| 9 | Ben Wallace | Detroit Pistons | 2 | 2002, 2003 |

== See also ==
- NBA records
- List of NBA career rebounding leaders
- List of NBA annual scoring leaders
- List of NBA annual 3-point scoring leaders
- List of NBA annual assists leaders
- List of NBA annual steals leaders
- List of NBA annual blocks leaders
