= Vaidas Kariniauskas =

Lithuanian basketball player (born 1993)

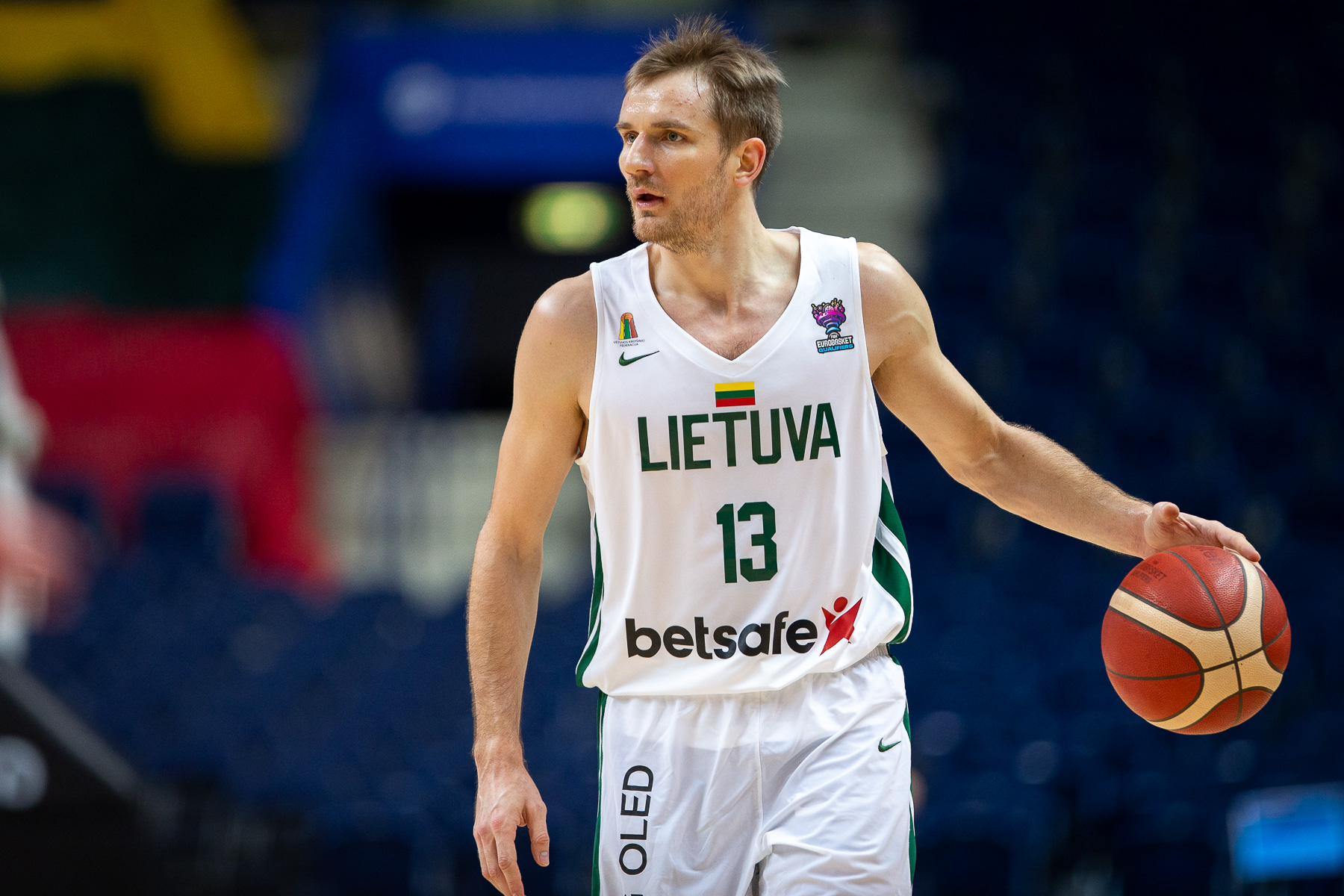
- Kariniauskas with Lithuania national team in 2021

No. 8 – BC Tauragė
- Position: Point guard
- League: LKL

Personal information
- Born: 16 November 1993 (age 32) Alytus, Lithuania
- Listed height: 198 cm (6 ft 6 in)
- Listed weight: 92 kg (203 lb)

Career information
- NBA draft: 2015: undrafted
- Playing career: 2009–present

Career history
- 2009–2015: Žalgiris
- 2009–2013: →Žalgiris-2
- 2013–2014: →Lietkabelis
- 2015–2016: Kymis
- 2016–2017: Cantù
- 2017–2018: U-BT Cluj-Napoca
- 2018: Oradea
- 2018–2019: Lietkabelis
- 2019: Kymis
- 2019–2020: Igokea
- 2020: Nevėžis Kėdainiai
- 2020–2021: Juventus Utena
- 2021–2022: Rytas Vilnius
- 2022: Brose Bamberg
- 2022–2023: Rapid București
- 2023–2025: Wolves Twinsbet
- 2025–2026: Šiauliai
- 2026–present: BC Tauragė

Career highlights
- Lithuanian League champion (2015, 2022); All-Lithuanian League Team (2021); Lithuanian League top scorer (2021); Bosnian League champion (2020); Romanian League Best Five (2018); Romanian League champion (2018); Greek 2nd Division Best Defender (2016); Greek 2nd Division champion (2016); LKF Cup winner (2015)
Medals
Men's basketball
Representing Lithuania
FIBA Europe Under-16 Championship
Silver medal – second place	2009 Lithuania	Team

Vaidas Kariniauskas (born 16 November 1993) is a Lithuanian professional basketball player and the team captain for BC Tauragė of the Lithuanian Basketball League (LKL). Standing at 1.98 m (6 ft 6 in), he primarily plays at the point guard position.

== Professional career ==
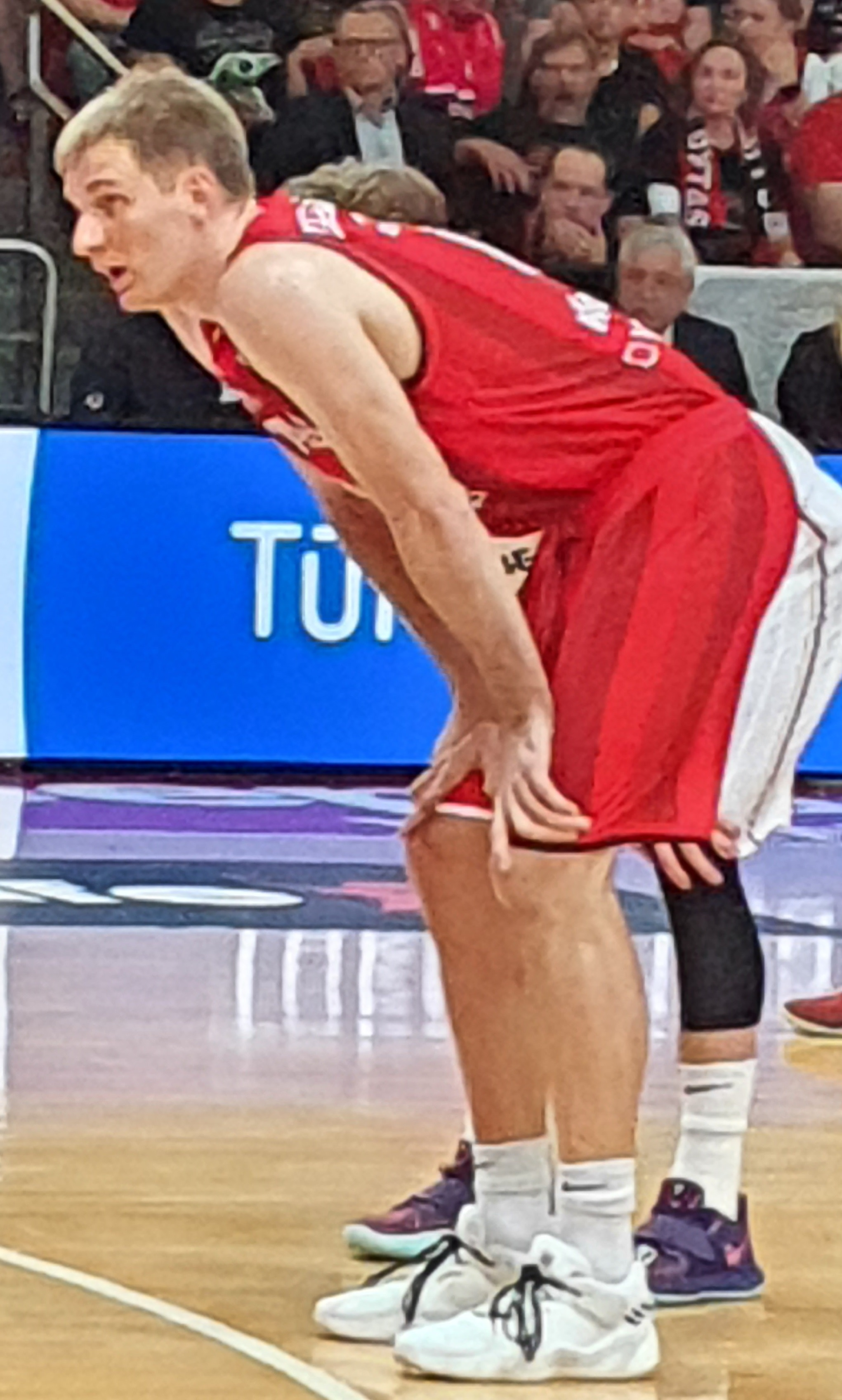
Kariniauskas with the Rytas Vilnius during the 2022 LKL Finals

Kariniauskas won the NKL bronze in 2012 and 2013 with BC Žalgiris-2. On 19 November 2013, he was loaned to BC Lietkabelis in order to get more playing time. After his loan spell, he rejoined Žalgiris for the 2014–15 season, winning the LKL league and the LKF Cup.

On 19 June 2015, Kariniauskas signed a 1+1 year deal with Kymis of the Greek A2 Basket League.

On 18 August 2016, Kariniauskas signed with Italian club Pallacanestro Cantù of the LBA. On 1 February 2017, he parted ways with Cantù. The same day, he signed with Romanian club U-BT Cluj-Napoca.

On 22 July 2021, Kariniauskas signed with Rytas Vilnius of the Lithuanian Basketball League.

On 2 August 2022, Kariniauskas signed a one-year deal with Brose Bamberg of the German Basketball Bundesliga.

On 8 December 2022, Kariniauskas signed with Rapid București of the Romanian Liga Națională.

On 14 September 2023, Kariniauskas signed a two-year contract with Wolves Twinsbet of the Lithuanian Basketball League (LKL) and the EuroCup.

On 7 August 2025, Kariniauskas signed with Šiauliai of the Lithuanian Basketball League (LKL).

On 6 July 2026, Kariniauskas signed one–year contract with BC Tauragė of the Lithuanian Basketball League (LKL).

== National team career ==
Kariniauskas was an active participant on youth competitions and won a silver medal at the 2009 European U-16 Championship. In 2015, he was included into the Lithuania men's national basketball team head coach Jonas Kazlauskas extended candidates list. Though, he was not invited to the training camp later on. He was invited to the training camp the following year. Firstly, Kariniauskas did not qualify for the Olympic roster, but later on he replaced Edgaras Ulanovas due to injury.

In 2023, Kariniauskas represented Lithuania at the 2023 FIBA Basketball World Cup. On 3 September 2023, he scored a team-high 15 points, along with four rebounds and two assists, leading Lithuania to a 110–104 win over the United States.
