= Domantas Sabonis =

Lithuanian-American basketball player (born 1996)

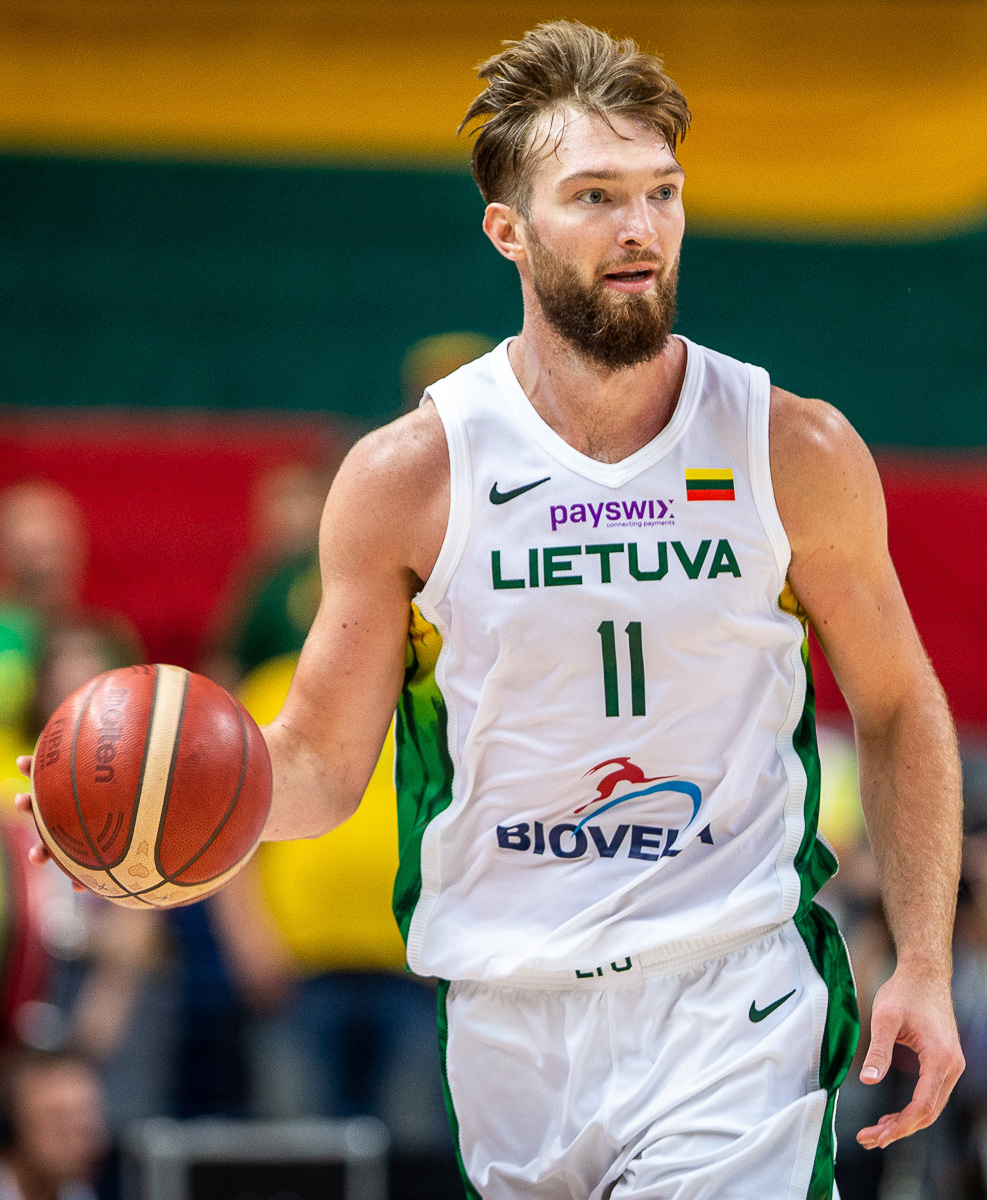
- Sabonis with the Lithuania national team in 2022

No. 11 – Sacramento Kings
- Position: Center / power forward
- League: NBA

Personal information
- Born: May 3, 1996 (age 30) Portland, Oregon, U.S.
- Listed height: 6 ft 10 in (2.08 m)
- Listed weight: 240 lb (109 kg)

Career information
- College: Gonzaga (2014–2016)
- NBA draft: 2016: 1st round, 11th overall pick
- Drafted by: Orlando Magic
- Playing career: 2012–present

Career history
- 2012–2014: Unicaja Málaga
- 2012–2013: →Clínicas Rincón
- 2016–2017: Oklahoma City Thunder
- 2017–2022: Indiana Pacers
- 2022–present: Sacramento Kings

Career highlights
- 3× NBA All-Star (2020, 2021, 2023); 2× All-NBA Third Team (2023, 2024); 3× NBA rebounding leader (2023–2025); 5× Lithuanian Basketball Player of the Year (2018–2020, 2022, 2024); AP Honorable Mention All-American (2016); Second-team Academic All-American (2016); First-team All-WCC (2016); Second-team All-WCC (2015); WCC All-Freshman Team (2015); No. 11 retired by Gonzaga Bulldogs
- Stats at NBA.com
- Stats at Basketball Reference
Medals
Men's basketball
Representing Lithuania
EuroBasket
Silver medal – second place	2015 France–Croatia–Germany–Latvia
European Youth Olympic Festival
Gold medal – first place	2011 Turkey	Team

Domantas Sabonis (Lithuanian pronunciation: [ˈdoːmɐntɐs sɐˈboːnʲɪs]; born May 3, 1996) is a Lithuanian-American professional basketball player for the Sacramento Kings of the National Basketball Association (NBA) and the Lithuanian national team. Son of the Hall of Fame player Arvydas Sabonis, Sabonis is a two-time All-NBA Team member, three-time NBA All-Star, and has led the league in rebounds thrice.

Sabonis started his career in Spain with Unicaja Málaga. He then moved to the United States and played college basketball for the Gonzaga Bulldogs. After being drafted 11th overall in the 2016 NBA draft by the Orlando Magic, Sabonis was traded to the Oklahoma City Thunder on draft night, spending his rookie season with the team before being traded to the Indiana Pacers in 2017. He played five seasons for the Pacers and was named an All-Star twice during his tenure. In 2022, Sabonis was traded to the Sacramento Kings for Tyrese Haliburton. Named to his first All-NBA team and third All-Star selection in 2023, he led the Kings alongside De'Aaron Fox to the third seed in the 2023 NBA playoffs and helped them break their NBA record 16-season playoff drought.

== Early life ==
Domantas was born on May 3, 1996, in Portland, Oregon, when his father, Arvydas Sabonis, was playing for the Portland Trail Blazers. His mother is Ingrida Mikelionytė, the first Miss Lithuania in 1988. He has two older brothers, Žygimantas (born 1991) and Tautvydas (born 1992), and a younger sister, Aušrinė (born 1997). When Arvydas was once asked if any of his sons will follow his footsteps in basketball, he singled out Domantas due to his stubbornness, and because he is left-handed.

In 2004, Domantas' father retired from basketball, and the whole family moved from Portland to Málaga, Spain.

I like a lot of things about his game. He is extremely aggressive, plays with a motor, is always going hard. Really high level rebounder, great passer, physical player, and runs and moves exceptionally well for a big guy.

— Mark Few, Gonzaga head coach.

College recruiting
Name	Hometown	School	Height	Weight	Commit date
Domantas Sabonis; PF	Kaunas, Lithuania	Sunny View School / Unicaja Málaga	6 ft 10 in (2.08 m)	210 lb (95 kg)	Apr 17, 2014
Domantas Sabonis; PF	Recruit ratings: Scout: Rivals: 247Sports: ESPN: (NR)				
Overall recruit ranking: Scout: NR Rivals: NR 247Sports: #26 ESPN: NR
Note: In many cases, Scout, Rivals, 247Sports, On3, and ESPN may conflict in their listings of height and weight.; In these cases, the average was taken. ESPN grades are on a 100-point scale.; Sources: "2014 Gonzaga Rivals Commits". Rivals.; "2014 Gonzaga Scout Commits". Scout.; "2014 Gonzaga ESPN Commits". ESPN.; "Scout.com Team Recruiting Rankings". Scout.; "2014 Team Ranking". Rivals.; "2014 Gonzaga 24/7 Sports Commits". 247Sports.

== College career ==
=== Freshman season (2014–2015) ===
Sabonis declined a Unicaja Málaga offer of a three-year $630,000 contract in order to play in the National Collegiate Athletic Association (NCAA). He committed to NCAA Division I squad Gonzaga University prior to the 2014–15 season. On November 14, 2014, Sabonis debuted by scoring 14 points, grabbing eight rebounds, and dishing two assists, along with one steal and one block in 20 minutes. On February 3, 2015, after averaging 13 points and 11 rebounds per 26 minutes he was named West Coast Conference Player of the Week. After a stellar regular season with Gonzaga, Sabonis was named to the All-WCC Second team, as well as to the WCC All-Freshman team. On March 10, Gonzaga defeated BYU 91–75 and won the WCC tournament title for the third straight time. Sabonis was one of the best players in the game with 15 points and six rebounds. During March Madness, Sabonis led Gonzaga to the Sweet 16 with 18 points and nine rebounds. Gonzaga beat UCLA to make it to the Elite Eight, Gonzaga's first regional final with Mark Few as head coach and second overall. Sabonis scored 12 points and grabbed eight rebounds during that game. The season ended with a loss to the future champions Duke and Sabonis was named to the NCAA tournament South Regional All-Tournament team. In his first NCAA season, Sabonis averaged 9.7 points, along with Gonzaga team highs of 66.8% field-goal percentage and 7.1 rebounds.

On April 4, Few told ESPN that Sabonis planned to return for his sophomore season at Gonzaga, adding that Sabonis never seriously considered declaring for the 2015 NBA draft.

=== Sophomore season (2015–2016) ===
On August 13, 2015, ESPN placed Sabonis 20th in its NCAA players rankings heading for the 2015–16 season, describing him as "one of the nation's best, and edgiest, rebounders".

No one plays harder than Gonzaga's Domantas Sabonis. The sophomore forward is a walking double-double, which could earn him third-team All-American honors.

— Jeff Goodman, ESPN.

Sabonis began his second NCAA season with an outstanding career-high performance of 26 points and he also added seven rebounds in a 91–52 win over Northern Arizona. On December 19, Sabonis set a new career high in points and rebounds, scoring 36 points and grabbing 16 rebounds as his team won 86–79 against Tennessee. The Gonzaga's head coach Mark Few said that he never had seen a monster line like that for a Gonzaga player. Two days later, Sabonis improved on another career high by dishing out six assists; he also scored 23 points, grabbed eight rebounds, and led Gonzaga to a 99–73 win over the Pepperdine. On January 2, 2016, he was just one point shy of his scoring record with 35 points; he also added 14 rebounds, four assists, and three blocks in an 102–94 overtime victory versus the San Francisco. On January 9, Sabonis once again improved his rebounds record by grabbing 17 rebounds, and adding 28 points, three steals, three blocks and four assists, his team won 85–74 over Portland. After the game, head coach Mark Few said: "Sabonis, none of us can take for granted the type of year he is having... Such consistency, it's amazing". On January 21, nearly posted a triple-double with 17 points, 13 rebounds, and a career-high seven assists in a 70–67 loss to Saint Mary's. Two days later, Sabonis grabbed a new career high of 20 rebounds, as well as 12 points and two assists in a 71–61 win over Pacific. He was named to the 35-man midseason watchlist for the Naismith Trophy on February 11. On March 1, he was included into the First-team All-WCC. Two days later, Sabonis received CoSIDA Academic All-American honors.

On March 17, Sabonis began his second March Madness appearance by leading his team past the Seton Hall Pirates 68–52 to the Round of 32, scoring 21 points, grabbing 16 rebounds and making four assists, despite having a flu. On March 19, he helped his team to advance into the Sweet 16 stage with 19 points, 10 rebounds, three assists and two steals, crushing the third-seeded Utah 82–59. Moreover, he limited his direct opponent and one of the top prospects Jakob Pöltl to just five points and four rebounds. Following it, Sabonis was the most efficient post-up player left in the NCAA tournament. Despite his yet another monster performance of 19 points, 17 rebounds (seven offensive) and five blocks on March 25, his journey was stopped by Syracuse during the final match moments, losing 63–60. In his second NCAA season Sabonis almost doubled his every single statistical line comparing with the previous season. During the March Madness, his averages were 19.6 points, 14.3 rebounds, 2.6 assists and 3.3 blocks. On March 29, Sabonis was named to the CBS College Basketball All-America Third-team, along with Ben Simmons, Brandon Ingram, Jamal Murray and Yogi Ferrell. Sabonis also was one of the finalists for the Kareem Abdul-Jabbar Award.

In early April 2016, several U.S. media reports indicated that Sabonis would declare himself eligible for the 2016 NBA draft and would hire an agent, marking the end of his career at Gonzaga. On April 20, he signed with Jason Ranne and Greg Lawrence of Wasserman Media Group for representation in the NBA draft. Prior to the draft, Sabonis rejected the offer to participate in NBA draft combine. Instead, he participated in four pre-draft workouts with the Phoenix Suns, Toronto Raptors, Boston Celtics and Utah Jazz.

== Professional career ==
=== Unicaja (2012–2014) ===
Despite being only a 16-year-old, on September 5, 2012, Sabonis debuted for Unicaja Málaga against Cibona Zagreb. He was later loaned to Clínicas Rincón for the 2012–13 season. He returned to Málaga for the 2013–14 season and debuted in the Liga ACB on October 13, 2013, becoming the youngest Unicaja player to debut in the ACB (17 years, 5 months and 10 days). On October 18, Sabonis debuted in the EuroLeague against Olympiacos Piraeus. In February 2014, he finished in the top 10 for the 2013 FIBA Europe Young Men's Player of the Year Award voting. His best ACB game came on May 3, when he scored 13 points on 100% shooting. On May 10, Sabonis helped Unicaja's junior team win the Spain Youth Basketball League silver medal. In the final game, he recorded 14 points and eight rebounds. In January 2015, he finished in the top 5 for the 2014 FIBA Europe Young Men's Player of the Year Award voting. During his time with Unicaja, he never signed a professional contract with salary in order to remain eligible for the NCAA.

=== Oklahoma City Thunder (2016–2017) ===
==== 2016–2017 season ====
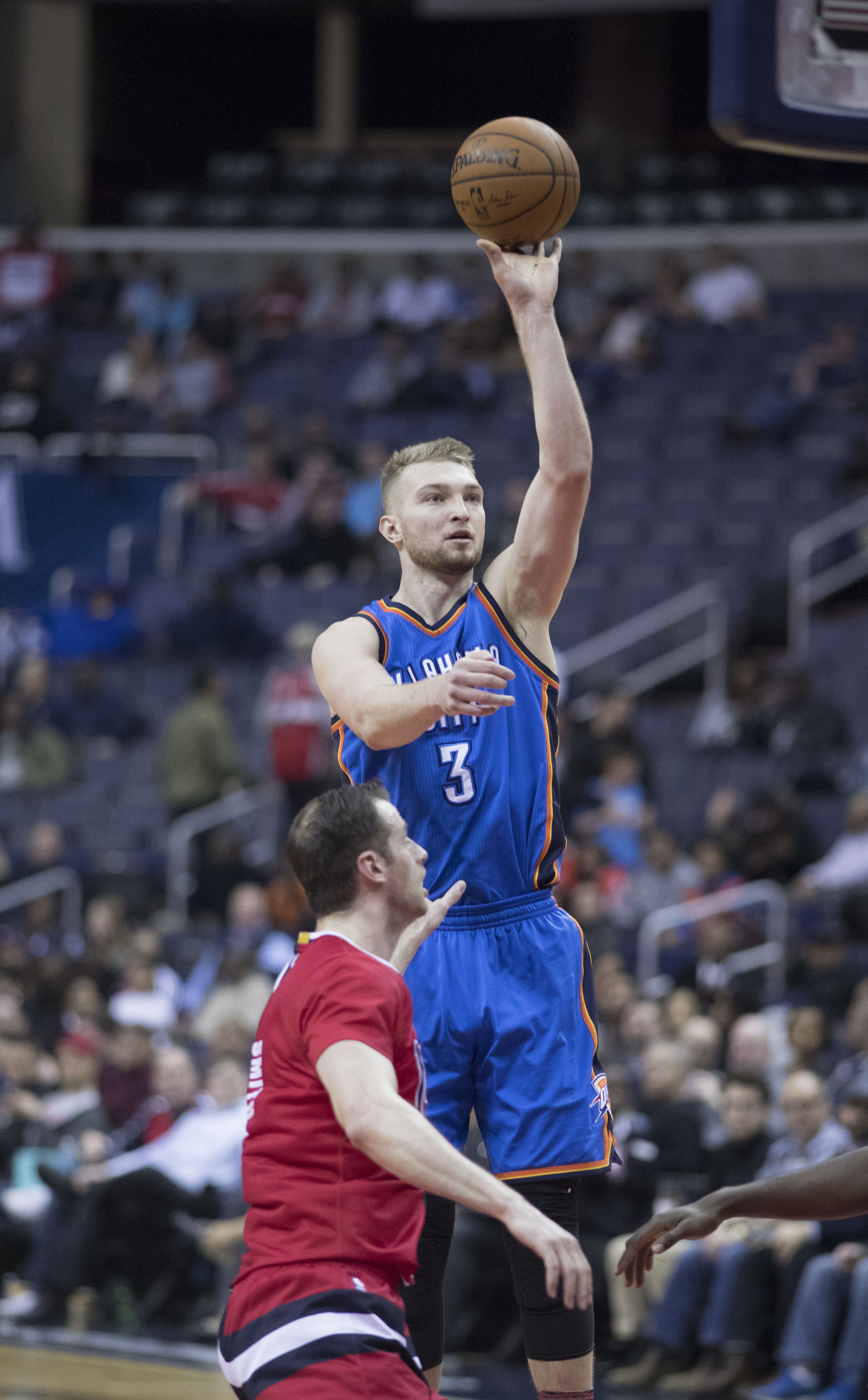
Sabonis with the Thunder in February 2017

Sabonis was selected 11th overall by the Orlando Magic in the 2016 NBA draft. He was traded to the Oklahoma City Thunder along with Ersan İlyasova and Victor Oladipo for Serge Ibaka on draft night. He did not participate in the 2016 NBA Summer League in order to join the Lithuania men's national basketball team training camp. On August 12, 2016, he signed his rookie scale contract with the Thunder. He made his debut for the Thunder in their season opener as their starting power forward on October 26, recording five points and four rebounds in 16 minutes, in a 103–97 win over the Philadelphia 76ers. He became the first Thunder player to debut as a starting five member since Kevin Durant. On November 7, he recorded season highs of 15 points and 10 rebounds in a 97–85 win over the Miami Heat. On December 23, he set a new season high with 20 points on 8-of-11 shooting in a 117–112 win over the Boston Celtics. On January 25, 2017, he was named in the World Team for the 2017 Rising Stars Challenge. Six days later, he matched his season high with 13 rebounds and had 13 points in a 108–94 loss to the San Antonio Spurs. On February 18, he scored 10 points on 5-of-8 shooting in only 12 minutes to help Team World defeat Team USA 150–141 in the Rising Stars Challenge during All-Star Weekend. Sabonis transitioned to a bench role in early March, following the acquisition of Taj Gibson at the trade deadline. In his debut season, he was a member of the starting five in 66 of 81 games. The Thunder qualified for the 2017 NBA playoffs as the sixth seed, but they were eliminated 4–1 by the Houston Rockets in the first round; Sabonis played just six minutes in the series, as he managed court time in just two of the five games. Upon concluding his rookie season, Sabonis indicated that he would participate in the 2017 NBA Summer League in preparation for EuroBasket 2017.

=== Indiana Pacers (2017–2022) ===
"Players respect me now, players depend on me. My teammates, when the game is tough they tell me, 'C'mon Domas, we need you,' and I like that, I like taking that responsibility."

— Domantas Sabonis, about his third season in the NBA.

==== 2017–18 season ====
On July 6, 2017, Sabonis was traded, along with Victor Oladipo, to the Indiana Pacers in exchange for Paul George. Due to the unexpected trade, he not only missed the 2017 NBA Summer League, but was also ruled out from representing the Lithuanian national team during EuroBasket 2017. In his debut for the Pacers in their season opener on October 18, Sabonis had 16 points and seven rebounds in a 140–131 win over the Brooklyn Nets. On October 29, he had 22 points and 12 rebounds, while going 9-of-9 from the field in a 97–94 win over the San Antonio Spurs. Two days later, he recorded a then career-high 16 rebounds, in addition to 12 points and five assists, in a 101–83 win over the Sacramento Kings. On November 2, he recorded a then career-high six assists in addition to 15 points and 12 rebounds in a 124–107 win over the Cleveland Cavaliers. On December 18, he had a career-high three blocked shots to go with 17 points and eight rebounds in a 109–97 win over the Nets. On January 3, 2018, he had a then career-high 24 points on 10-of-13 shooting in a 122–101 loss to the Milwaukee Bucks. While participating in the 2018 NBA Rising Stars Challenge, Sabonis recorded 13 points, 11 rebounds and three assists to help Team World defeat Team USA 155–124. On April 8, he scored a then career-high 30 points in a 123–117 win over the Charlotte Hornets. In game 5 of the Pacers' first-round playoff series against the Cavaliers, Sabonis scored a then-playoff career-high 22 points in a 98–95 loss.

==== 2018–19 season ====
On September 26, 2018, the Pacers picked up the team option on Sabonis' contract. On October 31, he was 12-for-12 shooting while matching his then career-high with 30 points in a 107–101 win over the New York Knicks. On November 19, he had 19 points, nine rebounds and a then career-high nine assists in a 121–94 win over the Utah Jazz. In December 2018, he was chosen as the Lithuanian Basketball Player of the Year by the Lithuanian Basketball Federation. On March 19, 2019, he tied a then career-high 16 rebounds in a 115–109 loss to the Los Angeles Clippers.

==== 2019–20 season ====
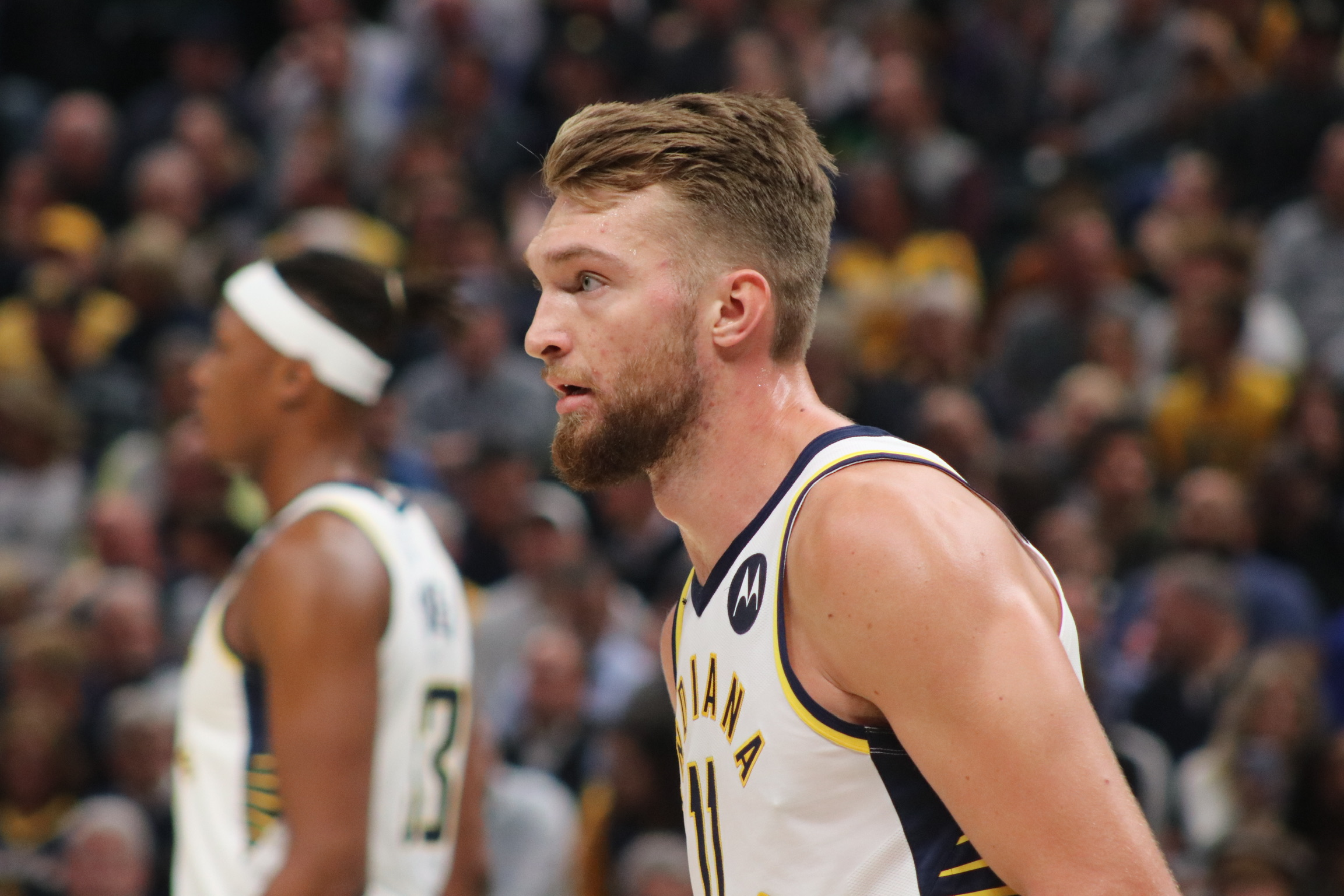
Sabonis with the Pacers in October 2019

On October 21, 2019, one day before the start of the 2019–20 season, Sabonis signed a four-year, $77 million contract extension with the Pacers. On November 1, Sabonis recorded a then career-high 17 rebounds in a 102–95 win versus the Cleveland Cavaliers. On November 18, Sabonis recorded a then career-high 18 rebounds, and helped his team to get a 115–86 victory versus the Brooklyn Nets. In December 2019, he was chosen as the Lithuanian Basketball Player of the Year for a second consecutive year. On December 15, Sabonis got his 12th consecutive double-double and improved previous Pacers record for the most consecutive double-doubles, which was held by Troy Murphy since 2009. On January 21, 2020, Sabonis became the first Lithuanian in NBA history to record a triple-double with 22 points, 15 rebounds and 10 assists as the Pacers won 115–107 over the Denver Nuggets. On January 26, he recorded his second triple-double with 27 points, 14 rebounds and a then career-high 11 assists. On January 30, Sabonis was chosen for the 2020 NBA All-Star Game after averaging 18 points, 12.8 rebounds, 4.6 assists, and became only the second Lithuanian to be chosen as an NBA All-Star, the other being Žydrūnas Ilgauskas. Sabonis also participated in the NBA All-Star Weekend Skills Challenge in 2020 and was just one shot away from the trophy, after being defeated only in the final by Bam Adebayo. During his first NBA All-Star Game appearance, Sabonis scored two points, grabbed six rebounds in 19 minutes and helped Team LeBron to win 157–155.

Sabonis participated in the NBA 2K Players Tournament during the coronavirus pandemic, playing against Montrezl Harrell, a center for the Los Angeles Clippers in an NBA 2K20 basketball game as their respective basketball teams. The Pacers finished as the fourth seed in the Eastern Conference with a 45–28 record after seeding games in the Orlando "bubble". Sabonis did not participate after leaving the team in July to treat plantar fasciitis in his left foot (after trying to play through the injury). Sabonis focused on rehab and was not added to the Pacers' active playoff roster during their 4–0 first round series loss against the Heat. Having not played a game since the NBA shutdown in March, he finished with averages of 18.5 points, 12.4 rebounds, and 5.0 assists per game. In November 2020, he was chosen as the Lithuanian Basketball Player of the Year for a third consecutive year.

==== 2020–21 season ====
On December 23, 2020, Sabonis started the 2020–21 season with a new career-high of 32 points, along with 13 rebounds, five assists, and one steal, and led his team to a 121–107 victory versus the New York Knicks. On December 27, Sabonis put up 19 points and 10 rebounds, alongside a game-winning layup, in a 108–107 win over the Boston Celtics. On January 9, 2021, Sabonis achieved his new rebounding record by having a double-double of 28 points, 22 rebounds, and four assists (this way he became the first player of the Pacers to have a double-double of at least 20 points and 20 rebounds in three quarters), but his team lost 125–117 to the Phoenix Suns. On January 22, Sabonis set a new career record of steals by having five of them, along with 18 points, 11 rebounds, and nine assists, his team won 120–118 in OT versus the Orlando Magic after he made a last shot to tie the game in the fourth quarter. On February 3, Sabonis improved his scoring record by having 33 points, 12 rebounds, and six assists in just three quarters in a 130–110 loss to the Milwaukee Bucks. On February 17, Sabonis once again improved his scoring record by having a triple-double of 36 points, 17 rebounds, and 10 assists, leading his team to a 134–128 victory versus the Minnesota Timberwolves, becoming the first player of the Pacers to have at least 30 points, 15 rebounds, and 10 assists in a single NBA game.

On February 26, he was named an All-Star, as an injury replacement to Kevin Durant. At the 2021 All-Star Game, Sabonis beat Nikola Vučević to win the Skills Challenge. On March 17, Sabonis logged his sixth triple-double of the season with 18 points, 11 rebounds and 11 assists in a 124–115 loss to the Brooklyn Nets, setting a new franchise record for the most number of triple-doubles in a season. After missing six games due to a back injury, Sabonis returned to action on May 1. He logged a triple-double in the first half and finished the game with 26 points, 19 rebounds and 14 assists across 30 minutes in a 152–95 win over the Oklahoma City Thunder, becoming the third player in league history to log a triple-double by halftime while also making history as the only player to record a 20-point triple-double at the break. In his efforts, Sabonis helped the Pacers record the biggest road win in league history and the second-biggest win in franchise history. On May 11, Sabonis logged his ninth triple-double of the season with 16 points, 13 rebounds and a then career-high 15 assists in a 103–94 win over the Philadelphia 76ers.

==== 2021–22 season ====
On January 5, 2022, Sabonis logged his fifteenth career triple-double with 32 points, 12 rebounds and 10 assists in a 129–121 loss to the Brooklyn Nets. Four days later, Sabonis scored a career-high 42 points on 18-of-22 shooting, propelling Indiana to a 125–113 win over the Utah Jazz. Moreover, it was the highest NBA scoring performance by a Lithuanian, surpassing the previous record held by Linas Kleiza since 2008.

=== Sacramento Kings (2022–present) ===
==== 2021–22 season ====
On February 8, 2022, with the Pacers looking to rebuild, Sabonis was traded along with Justin Holiday, Jeremy Lamb and a 2023 second-round pick to the Sacramento Kings in exchange for Tyrese Haliburton, Buddy Hield and Tristan Thompson. The next day, Sabonis debuted for the Kings in a 132–119 win over the Minnesota Timberwolves, logging 22 points in addition to 14 rebounds and five assists across 32 minutes of play. On February 10, Sabonis was selected as the Lithuanian Basketball Player of the Year for a fourth time. On March 9, he was suspended for one game without pay for making contact with a game official.

==== 2022–23 season ====
The triple-double he [Sabonis] had, the way he got it, I think Oscar Robertson was the only one who had a triple-double like that. To me, that's absolutely amazing. And it's not the one-off because it's not his first triple-double.

— Mike Brown, coach of the Sacramento Kings, about a historical triple-double of Sabonis.

On December 21, 2022, Sabonis recorded his 20th career triple-double with 13 points, 21 rebounds and 12 assists in a 134–120 win over the Los Angeles Lakers. The next game, Sabonis had his second consecutive triple-double with 20 points, 15 rebounds and 10 assists in a 125–111 loss against the Washington Wizards. On December 28, Sabonis scored a then season-high 31 points, along with 10 rebounds and five assists in a 127–126 win over the Denver Nuggets. The next game, Sabonis had 28 points on 12-for-12 shooting along with 11 rebounds and eight assists in a 126–125 win over the Utah Jazz.

On January 13, 2023, Sabonis recorded 19 points, 15 rebounds, and a career-high 16 assists in a 139–114 win over the Houston Rockets. Sabonis became the first player in Kings history to record at least 15 points, 15 rebounds, and 15 assists in a game since Oscar Robertson in 1965. On February 1, Sabonis scored a season-high 34 points on 15-of-20 shooting from the field, along with 11 rebounds, four assists, two steals and two blocks in a 119–109 win over the San Antonio Spurs.

On February 2, Sabonis was named to his third NBA All-Star Game as a reserve for the Western Conference. He, along with De'Aaron Fox, became the first Kings players to be named All-Stars since DeMarcus Cousins in 2016. On February 23, first game after the All-Star Weekend, Sabonis logged a triple-double with 18 points, 17 rebounds and 10 assists in a 133–116 victory over the Portland Trail Blazers. On March 13, Sabonis had 23 points, 17 rebounds and 15 assists for his 10th triple-double of the season in a 133–124 loss against the Milwaukee Bucks. He also tied Michael Jordan for 19th place in career triple-doubles with 28. On April 9, Sabonis ended the regular season as the league leader in rebounds, averaging 12.3 rebounds per game. He also achieved career-highs in field goal percentage (.615 FG%) and assists per game (7.3). On May 10, Sabonis was named to his first All-NBA team, making the third team with Kings teammate De'Aaron Fox. This is the first Sacramento-era season where multiple Kings players made the All-NBA team. On April 17, he scored a playoff career-high 24 points in the Kings' 114–106 victory against the Golden State Warriors. At one point during the game, he grabbed Draymond Green's leg and was stomped on the chest by Green afterwards. As a result, Sabonis was assessed with a technical foul. The Kings were eliminated in seven games.

On July 2, Sabonis and the Kings terminated the remaining one-season contract worth $19.4 million and signed a five-year contract extension worth $217 million. This is the most profitable contract in Lithuania's sport history.

==== 2023–24 season ====
On December 18, Sabonis logged the 35th triple-double of his career with 28 points, 13 rebounds and 12 assists in a 143–131 win over the Washington Wizards. On January 3, 2024, Sabonis recorded a triple-double with 22 points, a then season-high 23 rebounds and 12 assists in a 138–135 double overtime win over the Orlando Magic. On January 29, Sabonis scored 20 points on 10-of-11 shooting from the field, grabbed a career-high 26 rebounds and delivered five assists in a 103–94 win against the Memphis Grizzlies. He became the second player in NBA history with at least 20 points, 25 rebounds, five assists and a shooting percentage of 90% or better. The other was Wilt Chamberlain, who did it six times.

On February 13, Sabonis posted his 50th career triple-double with 35 points, 18 rebounds, 12 assists and three blocks in a 130–125 loss against the Phoenix Suns. On March 12, Sabonis recorded his 47th consecutive double-double with 22 points, 11 rebounds and eight assists in a 129–94 win over the Milwaukee Bucks. He surpassed Jerry Lucas' previous record of 46 to become the Sacramento Kings franchise leader in consecutive double-doubles in a season. On March 25, Sabonis had 11 points, 13 rebounds and 10 assists to become the fifth player in NBA history with at least 25 triple-doubles in a season, joining Nikola Jokić, Russell Westbrook, Wilt Chamberlain and Oscar Robertson. He also posted his 54th consecutive double-double, breaking a tie with Kevin Love for the longest streak since the 1976–77 merger between the NBA and ABA. On April 9, this streak would end as Sabonis had eight points and 13 rebounds in a 112–105 loss against the Oklahoma City Thunder, peaking at 61 consecutive double-doubles.

==== 2024–25 season ====
On June 14, 2024, the Sacramento Kings announced that Sabonis would switch to the No. 11 jersey to honor his father, Arvydas Sabonis, who wore the same number during his time with the Portland Trail Blazers. The Sacramento Kings had previously retired No. 11 to honor Bob Davies. However, Davies' children gave their blessing for Sabonis to use the retired number. On October 26, Sabonis posted his 59th career triple-double with 29 points, 12 rebounds, 10 assists in a 131–127 loss against the Los Angeles Lakers. He tied Larry Bird for the 10th-most triple-doubles in NBA history. On November 6, Sabonis posted a triple-double with 17 points, 13 assists, and 11 rebounds in a 122–107 win over the Toronto Raptors. He became the first player in NBA history to post a triple-double without a missed field goal, a turnover, and a foul. On December 12, Sabonis recorded a season-high 32 points and 20 rebounds on 11-of-15 shooting from the field and 9-of-9 from the free throw line in a 111–109 victory over the New Orleans Pelicans.

On January 7, 2025, Sabonis was selected as the Lithuanian Basketball Player of the Year for a fifth time. On January 10, Sabonis logged 23 points and a career-high 28 rebounds in a 114–97 win over the Boston Celtics. On February 13, Sabonis tied his career-high with 28 rebounds, along with 22 points and five assists in a 140–133 overtime loss against the New Orleans Pelicans. On April 11, Sabonis had 19 points, 16 rebounds and five assists in a 101–100 loss against the Los Angeles Clippers. He became the sixth player since the ABA/NBA merger to have 60 or more double-doubles for three consecutive seasons, joining Moses Malone, John Stockton, Tim Duncan, Kevin Garnett and Dwight Howard.

==== 2025–26 season ====
After missing the season opener on October 22, 2025, against the Phoenix Suns due to injury, Sabonis returned to the Kings' lineup in the next game on October 24. He scored 12 points, grabbed a game-high 12 rebounds, and made a put-back with 6.4 seconds remaining, securing a 105–104 victory over the Utah Jazz. On November 14, Sabonis scored a season-high 34 points and grabbed 11 rebounds in a 124–110 loss to the Minnesota Timberwolves. However, on November 19, Sabonis missed a game against the Oklahoma City Thunder due to a partially torn meniscus and was subsequently ruled out for at least three-to-four weeks. On December 19, it was announced that he would miss four-to-five more weeks in recovery. On January 16, 2026, Sabonis returned to the Kings' lineup after two months of recovery from an injury and by contributing 13 points, six rebounds, five assists helped his team to achieve a 128–115 victory over the Washington Wizards. On February 18, Sabonis underwent a season-ending surgery to repair his meniscus.

== National team career ==
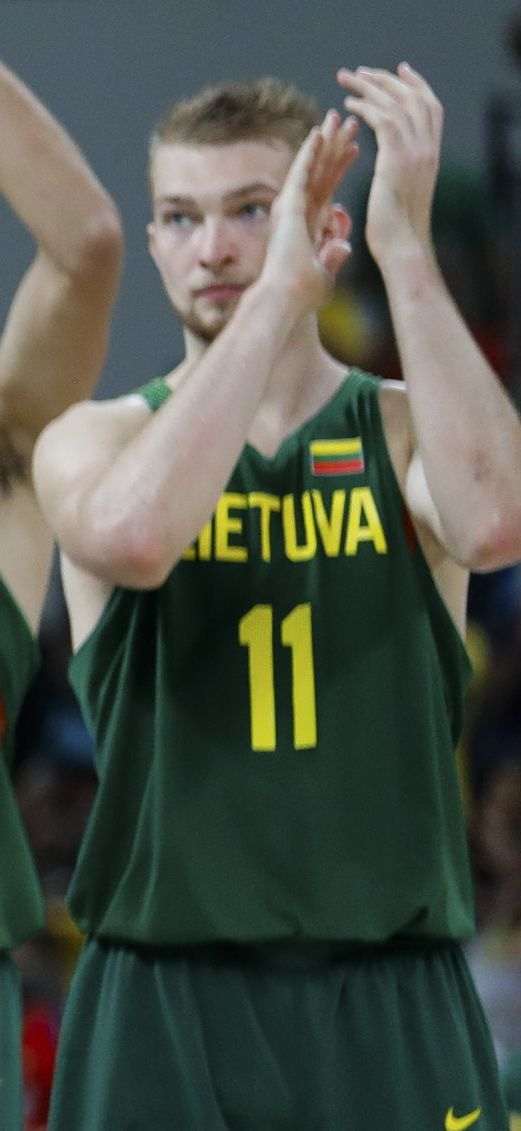
Sabonis with the Lithuanian national team during the 2016 Summer Olympics

=== Junior national team ===
I can say that another basketball star is growing. His father was uncommon and such human is one per 100 years. I was thinking that if Domantas will not interfere the national team it will be good, but when he actually helps I appreciate it very nicely.

— Jonas Kazlauskas, describing Arvydas Sabonis's son Domantas in 2015.

Sabonis made his international debut with the Lithuania U-16 national team at the 2012 FIBA U-16 European Championship, averaging 14.1 points, 14.4 rebounds and 2.4 assists per game. He grabbed a tournament-high 27 rebounds against Poland on July 27. In 2013, at 17 years of age, Sabonis played for the Lithuania U-18 team in 2013 FIBA Europe Under-18 Championship. He averaged 14 points, 11.4 rebounds and 1.4 assists per game and was tournament leader in rebounds per game. While playing against Serbia, he scored 22 points, grabbed 22 rebounds and dished out three assists. Lithuania won the game 74–70 in overtime. In 2014, coach Jonas Kazlauskas included Sabonis on the preliminary list for the Lithuania men's national basketball team. In 2014, D.Sabonis played in the FIBA Europe Under-18 Championship for the second time. This time he averaged 15.9 points, 12.0 rebounds and 3.6 assists per game. On July 9, 2015, he was invited to join the Lithuania men's national team training camp for the first time. On July 15, by participating in 2015 FIBA Europe Under-20 Championship, Sabonis achieved the tournament rebounds record by grabbing 28 against Ukraine. He led the tournament at 13.2 rebounds per game.

=== Senior national team ===
On July 29, 2015, Sabonis debuted for the Lithuania men's national team in a game against Australia, scoring four points and grabbing seven rebounds. Sabonis was the youngest player ever to play for the national team, beating Jonas Valančiūnas by a matter of days. Sabonis averaged six points and 5.9 rebounds during the preparation games phase, and was the team's second best rebounder after Valančiūnas. Sabonis played for Lithuania at EuroBasket 2015, winning a silver medal in his debut year. He also was a member of the Lithuanian Olympic national team during the 2016 Summer Olympics, where he averaged 5.5 points and 4.5 rebounds.

== Personal life ==
Sabonis married Shashana Rosen on August 15, 2021, in Saint-Jean-Cap-Ferrat, France; the wedding was officiated by a rabbi. They have three children: a son named Tiger, born on March 11, 2022, a daughter named Eleven Rose, born July 11, 2023, and a son named Tauras Levi, born in June, 2025. The family keeps Shabbat and eats only kosher food. In April 2023, his wife announced that Sabonis was in the process of converting to Judaism. Sabonis and his wife launched a wine brand in November 2024, dubbed Ones by Sabonis.

== Career statistics ==
Legend
GP	Games played	GS	Games started	MPG	Minutes per game
FG%	Field goal percentage	3P%	3-point field goal percentage	FT%	Free throw percentage
RPG	Rebounds per game	APG	Assists per game	SPG	Steals per game
BPG	Blocks per game	PPG	Points per game	**Bold**	Career high
*	Led the league

=== NBA ===
==== Regular season ====
Year	Team	GP	GS	MPG	FG%	3P%	FT%	RPG	APG	SPG	BPG	PPG
2016–17	Oklahoma City	81	66	20.1	.399	.321	.657	3.6	1.0	.5	.4	5.9
2017–18	Indiana	74	19	24.5	.514	.351	.750	7.7	2.0	.5	.4	11.6
2018–19	Indiana	74	5	24.8	.590	**.529**	.715	9.3	2.9	.6	.4	14.1
2019–20	Indiana	62	62	34.8	.540	.254	.723	12.4	5.0	.8	.5	18.5
2020–21	Indiana	62	62	**36.0**	.535	.321	.732	12.0	6.7	**1.2**	.5	**20.3**
2021–22	Indiana	47	46	34.7	.580	.324	.740	12.1	5.0	1.0	.5	18.9
2021–22	Sacramento	15	15	33.6	.554	.235	.743	12.3	5.8	.9	.3	18.9
2022–23	Sacramento	79	79	34.6	**.615**	.373	.742	12.3*	7.3	.8	.5	19.1
2023–24	Sacramento	**82**	**82***	35.7	.594	.379	.704	13.7*	**8.2**	.9	**.6**	19.4
2024–25	Sacramento	70	70	34.7	.590	.417	**.754**	**13.9***	6.0	.7	.4	19.1
2025–26	Sacramento	19	15	29.7	.543	.185	.727	11.4	4.1	.9	.2	15.8
Career		665	521	30.8	.559	.342	.729	10.7	4.9	.8	.5	16.1
All-Star		3	0	16.2	.571	—	.500	3.7	.7	.0	.0	3.3

==== Playoffs ====
Year	Team	GP	GS	MPG	FG%	3P%	FT%	RPG	APG	SPG	BPG	PPG
2017	Oklahoma City	2	0	3.0	.000	.000	**1.000**	1.0	.0	.5	.5	2.0
2018	Indiana	**7**	0	23.7	**.581**	.143	.778	4.6	.7	.1	.3	12.4
2019	Indiana	4	0	24.0	.414	**.250**	.643	7.3	4.0	.8	.3	8.5
2023	Sacramento	**7**	**7**	**34.7**	.495	.200	.571	**11.0**	**4.7**	**1.4**	**.9**	**16.4**
Career		20	7	25.6	.503	.176	.672	7.0	2.7	.8	.5	12.0

=== College ===
Year	Team	GP	GS	MPG	FG%	3P%	FT%	RPG	APG	SPG	BPG	PPG
2014–15	Gonzaga	**38**	1	21.6	**.668**	—	.664	7.1	.9	.4	.3	9.7
2015–16	Gonzaga	36	**31**	**31.9**	.611	**.357**	**.769**	**11.8**	**1.8**	**.6**	**.9**	**17.6**
Career		74	32	26.6	.632	.357	.729	9.4	1.3	.5	.6	13.5

== State awards ==
- Lithuania: Recipient of the Knight's Cross of the Order for Merits to Lithuania (2015)

== Filmography ==
Year	Title	Role	Notes
2024	Starting 5	Himself	Documentary series

== See also ==
- List of European basketball players in the United States
- List of NBA career field goal percentage leaders
- List of NBA career triple-double leaders
- List of NBA annual rebounding leaders
