= 2021–22 BC Žalgiris season =

Žalgiris Kaunas
2021–22 season
- Director: (Lithuania) Paulius Motiejūnas
- Sports director: Vacant
- Head coach: (Lithuania) Kazys Maksvytis
- Arena: Žalgiris Arena
- LKL: 3rd
- EuroLeague: 15th
- Lithuanian Cup: Champions
- Highest home attendance: 12,686; 91–84 (Spain) Barcelona (11 March 2022)
- Lowest home attendance: 1,151; 103-77 (Lithuania) Labas Gas (31 October 2021)
- Biggest win: +33; 97–64 (Lithuania) Šiauliai-7bet (17 October 2021)
- Biggest defeat: -34; 60–94 (Turkey) Anadolu Efes (29 October 2021)
Home	Away
- All statistics correct as of November 26, 2021.

The 2021–22 BC Žalgiris season is the 78th season in the existence of the club. The club has been playing in the Betsafe-LKL, King Mindaugas Cup and the EuroLeague. Coach Martin Schiller, who served as the team's head coach the previous season, was shortly after the season began replaced by Jure Zdovc in October 2021. He was then replaced by Kazys Maksvytis in early April after losing twice in a row in LKL and finishing last in Euroleague.

== Overview ==
In January 2021, The Lithuanian champions have reached a contract extension agreement with big man Joffrey Lauvergne, who has signed a 1+1 deal until the end of the 2022–23 season.

Right after the Betsafe-LKL Finals series was over, Žalgiris immediately started setting the stones for next season, extending a contract with point guard Lukas Lekavičius on a 1+1 deal.

== Players ==
Note: Flags indicate national team eligibility at FIBA-sanctioned events. Players may hold other non-FIBA nationalities not displayed.

Žalgiris roster
Players
Coaches

Pos.	No.	Nat.	Name	Ht.	Wt.	Age
G	0	(New Zealand)	Webster, Tai	1.93 m (6 ft 4 in)	89 kg (196 lb)	27 – 29 May 1995
C	1	(Lithuania)	Blaževič, Marek	2.09 m (6 ft 10 in)	114 kg (251 lb)	20 – 1 September 2001
PG	4	(Lithuania)	Lekavičius, Lukas	1.81 m (5 ft 11 in)	76 kg (168 lb)	28 – 30 March 1994
C	7	(United States)	Nebo, Josh	2.06 m (6 ft 9 in)	111 kg (245 lb)	24 – 17 July 1997
PG	9	(Lithuania)	Kalnietis, Mantas (injured)	1.96 m (6 ft 5 in)	90 kg (198 lb)	35 – 6 September 1986
PF	10	(Lithuania)	Miniotas, Regimantas	2.06 m (6 ft 9 in)	105 kg (231 lb)	26 – 14 March 1996
PF	13	(Lithuania)	Jankūnas, Paulius (C)	2.05 m (6 ft 9 in)	113 kg (249 lb)	38 – 29 April 1984
SG	16	(Lithuania)	Lukošiūnas, Karolis	1.95 m (6 ft 5 in)	92 kg (203 lb)	24 – 4 August 1997
G/F	17	(Lithuania)	Rubštavičius, Mantas	1.98 m (6 ft 6 in)	84 kg (185 lb)	20 – 6 May 2002
SG	21	(Lithuania)	Milaknis, Artūras	1.95 m (6 ft 5 in)	90 kg (198 lb)	35 – 6 June 1986
PG	26	(Lithuania)	Sargiūnas, Titas	1.90 m (6 ft 3 in)	82 kg (181 lb)	19 – 26 March 2003
G	32	(Latvia)	Strēlnieks, Jānis	1.91 m (6 ft 3 in)	88 kg (194 lb)	32 – 1 September 1989
PF	34	(United States)	Cavanaugh, Tyler	2.06 m (6 ft 9 in)	108 kg (238 lb)	28 – 9 February 1994
SF	55	(Germany)	Giffey, Niels	2.01 m (6 ft 7 in)	93 kg (205 lb)	30 – 8 June 1991
C	77	(France)	Lauvergne, Joffrey	2.11 m (6 ft 11 in)	118 kg (260 lb)	30 – 30 September 1991
SF	92	(Lithuania)	Ulanovas, Edgaras	1.98 m (6 ft 6 in)	94 kg (207 lb)	30 – 7 January 1992

Head coach

- (Lithuania) Kazys Maksvytis

Assistant coach(es)

- (Lithuania) Tautvydas Sabonis
- (Lithuania) Gintaras Krapikas
- (Lithuania) Evaldas Beržininkaitis

Athletic trainer(s)

- (Lithuania) Sigitas Kavaliauskas
- (Lithuania) Nerijus Navickas

Doctor

- (Lithuania) Vytautas Kailius

Physiotherapist(s)

- (Lithuania) Paulius Jacikas

Legend

- (C) Team captain
- Injured

- Roster
Updated: April 11, 2022

=== Depth chart ===
Pos.	Starting 5	Bench 1	Bench 2	Bench 3
C	Joffrey Lauvergne	Josh Nebo	Marek Blaževič
PF	Tyler Cavanaugh	Paulius Jankūnas	Regimantas Miniotas
SF	Edgaras Ulanovas	Niels Giffey		Mantas Rubštavičius
SG	Jānis Strēlnieks	Artūras Milaknis	Karolis Lukošiūnas	Titas Sargiūnas
PG	Lukas Lekavičius	Tai Webster		Mantas Kalnietis

=== Transactions ===
==== Players in ====
No.	Pos.	Nat.	Name	Moving from		Type	Date	Source
34	PF	(United States)	Tyler Cavanaugh	Lenovo Tenerife	(Spain)	End of contract	June 2021	
55	SF	(Germany)	Niels Giffey	Alba Berlin	(Germany)	End of contract	June 2021	
9	PG	(Lithuania)	Mantas Kalnietis	Lokomotiv Kuban	(Russia)	End of contract	June 2021	
7	F/C	(United States)	Josh Nebo	Hapoel Eilat	(Israel)	End of contract	June 2021	
92	SF	(Lithuania)	Edgaras Ulanovas	Fenerbahçe Beko	(Turkey)	End of contract	10 July 2021	
32	G	(Latvia)	Jānis Strēlnieks	CSKA Moscow	(Russia)	End of contract	29 July 2021	
8	PG	(United States)	Emmanuel Mudiay	Free agent			24 August 2021	
30	SG	(Slovenia)	Zoran Dragić	Baskonia Vitoria-Gasteiz	(Spain)	End of contract	30 October 2021	
0	G	(New Zealand)	Tai Webster	New Zealand Breakers	(New Zealand)	Released	2 November 2021	
10	PF	(Lithuania)	Regimantas Miniotas	Bilbao Basket	(Spain)	Released	18 November 2021	

==== Players out ====
No.	Pos.	Nat.	Name	Moving to		Type	Date	Source
0	G	(United States)	Thomas Walkup	Olympiacos	(Greece)	End of contract	June 2021	
10	PF	(United States)	Nigel Hayes	Barcelona	(Spain)	End of contract	June 2021	
7	G/F	(Argentina)	Patricio Garino	Nanterre 92	(France)	End of contract	July 2021	
23	C	(Lithuania)	Martinas Geben	Brose Bamberg	(Germany)	End of contract	July 2021	
24	F/C	(United States)	Augustine Rubit	Bayern Munich	(Germany)	End of contract	July 2021	
31	PG	(Lithuania)	Rokas Jokubaitis	Barcelona	(Spain)	Buyout	July 2021	
40	SG	(Lithuania)	Marius Grigonis	CSKA Moscow	(Russia)	End of contract	June 2021	
32	G/F	(United States)	Steve Vasturia	Beşiktaş	(Turkey)	End of contract	August 2021	
8	PG	(United States)	Emmanuel Mudiay	Free agent		Released	November 2021	
30	SG	(Slovenia)	Zoran Dragić	Cedevita Olimpija	(Slovenia)	Released	December 2021	

==== Players out on loan ====
No.	Pos.	Nat.	Name	Moving to		Type	Date	Source
8	F	(Lithuania)	Paulius Murauskas	Nevėžis Kėdainiai	(Lithuania)	Loan	July 2021	
33	SG	(Lithuania)	Tomas Dimša	De' Longhi Treviso	(Italy)	Loan	July 2021	

== Club ==
=== Technical staff ===
Position	Staff member
Director	(Lithuania) Paulius Motiejūnas
Sports Director	Vacant
Head Coach	(Lithuania) Kazys Maksvytis
Assistant Coaches	(Lithuania) Tautvydas Sabonis
Assistant Coaches	(Lithuania) Gintaras Krapikas
Assistant Coaches	(Lithuania) Evaldas Beržininkaitis
Athletic Coaches	(Lithuania) Sigitas Kavaliauskas
Athletic Coaches	(Lithuania) Nerijus Navickas
Physiotherapist	(Lithuania) Paulius Jacikas
Physician	(Lithuania) Vytautas Kailius
Team Manager	(Lithuania) Mindaugas Kvedaras

=== Staff transactions ===
==== In ====
Position	Staff member	Date	Source
Assistant Coach	(Austria) Stefan Grassegger	23 June 2021	
Sports Director	(France) François Lamy	24 August 2021	
Head Coach	(Slovenia) Jure Zdovc	9 October 2021	
Assistant Coach	(Lithuania) Evaldas Beržininkaitis	1 December 2021	
Head Coach	(Lithuania) Kazys Maksvytis	11 April 2022	
Assistant Coach	(Lithuania) Gintaras Krapikas	11 April 2022	

==== Out ====
Position	Staff member	Date	Source
Assistant Coach	(Lithuania) Evaldas Beržininkaitis	23 June 2021	
Head Coach	(Austria) Martin Schiller	9 October 2021	
Assistant Coaches	(Germany) Arne Woltmann	1 December 2021	
Assistant Coaches	(Austria) Stefan Grassegger	1 December 2021	
Sports Director	(France) François Lamy	2 February 2022	
Head Coach	(Slovenia) Jure Zdovc	11 April 2022	

== Pre-season games ==
Win Loss

1 September 2021 1	Žalgiris (Lithuania)	87–88	(Russia) Lokomotiv Kuban	Kaunas
18:00	Scoring by quarter: 22-22, 24-22, 21-27, 20-17
	Pts: Mudiay 21; Rebs: Lauvergne 9 Asts: Lauvergne, Mudiay 5 PIR: Mudiay 22	Boxscore	Pts: McCollum 23; Rebs: Martiuk 7 Asts: McCollum 7 PIR: McCollum 27	Arena: Kaunas Žalgiris Basketball Academy; Attendance: not available Referees: Jurgis Laurinavičius, Gytis Vilius, Artūras Šukys

3 September 2021 2	Žalgiris (Lithuania)	80–82	(Lithuania) Lietkabelis	Kaunas
18:00	Scoring by quarter: 20-14, 15-27, 25-23, 20-18
	Pts: Lekavičius 14; Rebs: Nebo 7 Asts: Kalnietis, Ulanovas 4 PIR: Nebo 16	Boxscore	Pts: Orelik 16; Rebs: Orelik 6 Asts: three players 4 PIR: Orelik 18	Arena: Sabonis Basketball Center School; Attendance: not available Referees: Gytis Vilius, Jurgis Laurinavičius, Artūras Šukys

8 September 2021 3	Žalgiris (Lithuania)	69–76	(Russia) Lokomotiv Kuban	Belek
19:00	Scoring by quarter: 18-20, 16-20, 11-19, 24-17
	Pts: Lauvergne 17; Rebs: Cavanaugh 7 Asts: Cavanaugh 3 PIR: Lauvergne 17	Boxscore	Pts: Motley 21; Rebs: Motley 12; Asts: Kidd 7 PIR: Motley 34	Arena: Gloria Sports Arena; Attendance: not available Referees: Luigi Lamonica, Mykola Ambrosov, Sébastien Clivaz

10 September 2021 4	Tofaş (Turkey)	71–57	(Lithuania) Žalgiris	Belek
16:30	Scoring by quarter: 16-23, 14-16, 18-14, 23-4
	Pts: Shepherd 18; Rebs: Cook 10; Asts: Cruz 5 PIR: Cook 21	Boxscore	Pts: Lekavičius 10; Rebs: Lauvergne 11; Asts: Lekavičius 6 PIR: Lauvergne 16	Arena: Gloria Sports Arena; Attendance: not available Referees: Borys Ryzhyk, Mykola Ambrosov, Artem Lavrukhin

12 September 2021 5	Anadolu Efes (Turkey)	82–60	(Lithuania) Žalgiris	Belek
17:00	Scoring by quarter: 22-14, 27-14, 18-17, 15-15
	Pts: Tuncer 18; Rebs: Petrušev 8 Asts: three players 5 PIR: Petrušev 20	Boxscore	Pts: Lauvergne 10; Rebs: Lauvergne 12; Asts: Ulanovas 5 PIR: Lauvergne 20	Arena: Gloria Sports Arena; Attendance: 20; Referees: Luigi Lamonica, Mykola Ambrosov, Artem Lavrukhin

== Competitions ==
=== Overview ===
Competition	Record							
Competition	Pld	W	D	L	PF	PA	PD	Win %
Betsafe-LKL	43	34	0	9	3,618	3,237	+381	79.07
EuroLeague	28	8	0	20	2,084	2,249	−165	28.57
King Mindaugas Cup	4	4	0	0	325	268	+57	100.00
Total	75	46	0	29	6,027	5,754	+273	61.33

Last updated: May 28, 2022
Source: Competitions

=== Betsafe-LKL ===
==== Regular season ====
Pos	Team	Pld	W	L	PF	PA	PD	Qualification or relegation
1	Rytas	30	26	4	2685	2257	+428	Advance to playoffs
2	Žalgiris	30	26	4	2578	2247	+331	Advance to playoffs
3	Lietkabelis	30	23	7	2522	2233	+289	Advance to playoffs
4	Cbet Jonava	30	16	14	2373	2451	−78	Advance to playoffs
5	Šiauliai–7bet	30	15	15	2459	2464	−5	Advance to playoffs

Source: LKL.lT

==== Results summary ====
Overall						Home					Away				
Pld	W	L	PF	PA	PD	W	L	PF	PA	PD	W	L	PF	PA	PD
30	26	4	2578	2247	+331	9	1	923	748	+175	17	3	1655	1499	+156

Source: Competitive matches

==== Results by round ====
Round	1	2	3	4	5	6	7	8	9	10	11	12	13	14	15	16	17	18	19	20	21	22	23	24	25	26	27	28	29	30
Ground	A	A	A	A	H	A	H	H	H	H	H	A	H	A	A	A	A	H	A	A	A	H	A	A	A	A	H	A	A	A
Result	W	W	W	W	W	W	W	W	L	W	W	W	W	W	W	W	W	W	W	W	W	W	W	L	L	W	W	W	L	W
Position	1	1	1	1	1	1	1	1	1	2	2	1	1	1	1	1	1	1	1	1	1	1	1	1	2	2	1	2	2	2

Source: Competitive matches
Ground: A = Away; H = Home; R = Rest. Result: L = Loss; W = Win; R = Rest; P = Postponed.

Win Loss

==== Matches ====
20 September 2021 1	CBet Jonava	80–86	Žalgiris	Jonava
18:50 (EEST)	Scoring by quarter: 24–27, 16–20, 18–25, 22–14
BTV; Go3	Pts: Anderson 20; Rebs: Kozys, Palacios 7 Asts: Lecomte 7 PIR: Anderson 24	Boxscore	Pts: Lekavičius 18; Rebs: Lauvergne 9 Asts: Strēlnieks, Ulanovas 4 PIR: Lekavičius 20	Arena: Jonavos sporto arena Attendance: 1700; Referees: Saulius Račys, Gvidas Gedvilas, Oleg Barkovskij

23 September 2021 2	Dzūkija	100–105(OT)	Žalgiris	Alytus
18:50 (EEST)	Scoring by quarter: 17–26, 20–14, 14–17, 30–24, Overtime: 14–14, 5–10
BTV; Go3	Pts: Furmanavičius 26; Rebs: Łapeta 10; Asts: Newkirk 5 PIR: Furmanavičius 27	Boxscore	Pts: Mudiay 32; Rebs: Jankūnas, Nebo 7 Asts: Lekavičius 7 PIR: Mudiay 44	Arena: Alytus Sports and Recreation Center; Attendance: 550; Referees: Artūras Šukys, Gintaras Vitkauskas, Gabrielius Simonavičius

27 September 2021 3	Lietkabelis	69–73	Žalgiris	Panevėžys
18:50 (EEST)	Scoring by quarter: 17–16, 20–20, 17–11, 15–26
BTV; Go3	Pts: Žemaitis 12; Rebs: Gagić 7 Asts: Radičević, Žemaitis 4 PIR: Gagić 14	Boxscore	Pts: Strēlnieks 18; Rebs: Lauvergne 7 Asts: Strēlnieks 7 PIR: Strēlnieks 25	Arena: Cido Arena; Attendance: 1951; Referees: Gytis Vilius, Jurgis Laurinavičius, Gintaras Mačiulis

3 October 2021 4	Pieno žvaigždės	69–85	Žalgiris	Pasvalys
17:20 (EEST)	Scoring by quarter: 10–22, 19–25, 23–19, 17–19
BTV; Go3	Pts: Jarumbauskas 15; Rebs: Jarumbauskas, Guščikas 7 Asts: Beručka, Danisevičius 3 PIR: Jarumbauskas 20	Boxscore	Pts: Cavanaugh 14; Rebs: Lauvergne 5 Asts: Mudiay 8 PIR: Nebo 19	Arena: Pieno žvaigždės Arena; Attendance: 750; Referees: Gintaras Vitkauskas, Vilius Mačiulaitis, Darius Šomka

10 October 2021 5	Žalgiris	98–79	Neptūnas	Kaunas
17:20 (EEST)	Scoring by quarter: 23–19, 20–23, 23–19, 32–18
BTV; Go3	Pts: Mudiay 18; Rebs: Giffey 6 Asts: Kalnietis 8 PIR: Giffey 27	Boxscore	Pts: Griciūnas 23; Rebs: Griciūnas 7 Asts: Janavičius, Jogėla 5 PIR: Griciūnas 28	Arena: Žalgiris Arena; Attendance: 2133; Referees: Tomas Jasevičius, Juozas Barkauskas, Šarūnas Gabrilavičius

17 October 2021 6	Šiauliai-7bet	64–97	Žalgiris	Šiauliai
17:00 (EEST)	Scoring by quarter: 19–21, 10–27, 21–22, 14–27
BTV; Go3	Pts: Elmore 16; Rebs: Staniulis 6 Asts: Sabeckis 7 PIR: Armwood 16	Boxscore	Pts: Cavanaugh 15; Rebs: Cavanaugh 14; Asts: Kalnietis 8 PIR: Cavanaugh 26	Arena: Šiauliai Arena; Attendance: 3118; Referees: Artūras Šukys, Andžej Urbanovič, Gabrielius Simonavičius

23 October 2021 7	Žalgiris	102–77	Nevėžis-OPTIBET	Kaunas
17:20 (EEST)	Scoring by quarter: 27–25, 22–6, 25–17, 28–29
BTV; Go3	Pts: Cavanaugh 19; Rebs: Blaževič 9 Asts: Kalnietis 12; PIR: Kalnietis 26	Boxscore	Pts: Kuksiks 16; Rebs: Sylla 5 Asts: Valinskas 7 PIR: Valinskas 18	Arena: Žalgiris Arena; Attendance: 1381; Referees: Tomas Jasevičius, Juozas Barkauskas, Aurimas Borusas

31 October 2021 8	Žalgiris	103–77	Labas Gas	Kaunas
17:20 (EET)	Scoring by quarter: 32–16, 29–24, 20–23, 22–14
BTV; Go3	Pts: Lekavičius 19; Rebs: Nebo 8 Asts: Kalnietis 6 PIR: Lekavičius 25	Boxscore	Pts: Durham 16; Rebs: Durham 6 Asts: Umipig 4 PIR: Durham 23	Arena: Žalgiris Arena; Attendance: 1151; Referees: Tomas Jasevičius, Saulius Račys, Andžej Urbanovič

7 November 2021 9	Žalgiris	75–84	Rytas	Kaunas
17:20 (EET)	Scoring by quarter: 18–21, 8–25, 21–17, 28–21
BTV; Go3	Pts: Lekavičius 23; Rebs: Nebo 8 Asts: Lekavičius 4 PIR: Lekavičius 27	Boxscore	Pts: Buva, Girdžiūnas 21; Rebs: Radzevičius 7 Asts: Smith 5 PIR: Girdžiūnas 27	Arena: Žalgiris Arena; Attendance: 5603; Referees: Gytis Vilius, Jurgis Laurinavičius, Gvidas Gedvilas

21 November 2021 10	Žalgiris	101–77	Uniclub Casino – Juventus	Kaunas
17:20 (EET)	Scoring by quarter: 18–21, 19–26, 23–11, 41–19
BTV; Go3	Pts: Cavanaugh 20; Rebs: Cavanaugh 7 Asts: Lekavičius 8 PIR: Cavanaugh 26	Boxscore	Pts: Miller 19; Rebs: Gustys 11; Asts: Miller 8 PIR: Miller 24	Arena: Žalgiris Arena; Attendance: 2401; Referees: Tomas Jasevičius, Artūras Šukys, Martynas Karaliūnas

5 December 2021 11	Žalgiris	84–70	Lietkabelis	Kaunas
17:20 (EET)	Scoring by quarter: 18–15, 19–16, 28–20, 19–19
BTV; Go3	Pts: Strēlnieks 23; Rebs: Miniotas, Ulanovas 8 Asts: Kalnietis 7 PIR: Strēlnieks 23	Boxscore	Pts: Kalaitzakis 19; Rebs: Maldūnas 6 Asts: Orelik 4 PIR: Kalaitzakis 22	Arena: Žalgiris Arena; Attendance: 2396; Referees: Jurgis Laurinavičius, Saulius Račys, Juozas Barkauskas

12 December 2021 12	Labas Gas	78–81	Žalgiris	Prienai
17:20 (EET)	Scoring by quarter: 21–20, 16–20, 16–20, 25–21
BTV; Go3	Pts: Durham 23; Rebs: Durham 11; Asts: Staniulis 6 PIR: Durham 31	Boxscore	Pts: Cavanaugh 14; Rebs: Nebo 13; Asts: Lekavičius 9 PIR: Nebo 22	Arena: Prienai Arena; Attendance: 1100; Referees: Gvidas Gedvilas, Andžej Urbanovič, Šarūnas Gabrilavičius

19 December 2021 13	Žalgiris	78–70	Dzūkija	Kaunas
17:20 (EET)	Scoring by quarter: 14–19, 18–15, 31–13, 15–23
BTV; Go3	Pts: Ulanovas 15; Rebs: Ulanovas 7 Asts: Kalnietis 9 PIR: Ulanovas 19	Boxscore	Pts: Newkirk 22; Rebs: Čepukaitis 9 Asts: Aranitović, Newkirk 4 PIR: Aranitović 20	Arena: Žalgiris Arena; Attendance: 1390; Referees: Jurgis Laurinavičius, Aurimas Borusas, Oleg Barkovskij

27 December 2021 14	Uniclub Casino – Juventus	71–78(OT)	Žalgiris	Utena
18:50 (EET)	Scoring by quarter: 16–21, 15–15, 14–15, 21–15, Overtime: 5–12
BTV; Go3	Pts: Airington 20; Rebs: three players 5 Asts: Airington 5 PIR: Airington 23	Boxscore	Pts: Cavanaugh 14; Rebs: Cavanaugh 16; Asts: Kalnietis, Strēlnieks 4 PIR: Cavanaugh 23	Arena: Utena Arena; Attendance: 1957; Referees: Gytis Vilius, Saulius Račys, Juozas Barkauskas

2 January 2022 15	Nevėžis-OPTIBET	69–77	Žalgiris	Kėdainiai
17:20 (EET)	Scoring by quarter: 24–27, 15–17, 17–17, 13–16
BTV; Go3	Pts: Smajlagić 19; Rebs: Sylla 9 Asts: Starks 6 PIR: Smajlagić 16	Boxscore	Pts: Cavanaugh 18; Rebs: Cavanaugh 11; Asts: Cavanaugh 4 PIR: Cavanaugh 29	Arena: Kėdainiai Arena; Attendance: 1322; Referees: Artūras Šukys, Aurimas Borusas, Gabrielius Simonavičius

7 January 2022 16	Šiauliai-7bet	86–89	Žalgiris	Šiauliai
18:30 (EET)	Scoring by quarter: 23–20, 23–22, 14–18, 26–29
Go3	Pts: Elmore 32; Rebs: Armwood, Paulius Danusevičius 6 Asts: Elmore 7 PIR: Elmore 34	Boxscore	Pts: Cavanaugh 26; Rebs: Cavanaugh 8 Asts: Cavanaugh 5 PIR: Cavanaugh 36	Arena: Šiauliai Arena; Attendance: 3208; Referees: Tomas Jasevičius, Gintaras Mačiulis, Darius Šomka

13 January 2022 17	Labas Gas	71–88	Žalgiris	Prienai
18:30 (EET)	Scoring by quarter: 19–20, 17–27, 20–14, 15–27
Go3	Pts: Kljajič 21; Rebs: Ivanauskas 10; Asts: Kljajič 5 PIR: Ivanauskas 21	Boxscore	Pts: Blaževič 23; Rebs: Blaževič 8 Asts: Lekavičius 5 PIR: Blaževič 30	Arena: Prienai Arena; Attendance: 416; Referees: Jurgis Laurinavičius, Aurimas Borusas, Oleg Barkovskij

23 January 2022 18	Rytas	67–72	Žalgiris	Vilnius
17:20 (EET)	Scoring by quarter: 18–17, 15–21, 17–17, 17–17
BTV; Go3	Pts: Buva 20; Rebs: Butkevičius 7 Asts: Smith 4 PIR: Butkevičius 19	Boxscore	Pts: Ulanovas 19; Rebs: Ulanovas 8 Asts: Kalnietis 4 PIR: Ulanovas 24	Arena: Jeep Arena; Attendance: 9006; Referees: Gytis Vilius, Tomas Jasevičius, Jurgis Laurinavičius

30 January 2022 19	Neptūnas	60–77	Žalgiris	Klaipėda
17:20 (EET)	Scoring by quarter: 16–25, 21–16, 13–18, 10–18
BTV; Go3	Pts: Janavičius 13; Rebs: Griciūnas, Želionis 5 Asts: Janavičius 6 PIR: Janavičius 13	Boxscore	Pts: Ulanovas 15; Rebs: Miniotas 7 Asts: Lekavičius 6 PIR: Ulanovas 23	Arena: Švyturys Arena; Attendance: 2105; Referees: Artūras Šukys, Gintaras Vitkauskas, Juozas Barkauskas

6 February 2022 20	Žalgiris	99–70	Pieno žvaigždės	Kaunas
17:20 (EET)	Scoring by quarter: 33–16, 23–21, 15–22, 28–11
Go3	Pts: Lukošiūnas 20; Rebs: Jankūnas 8 Asts: Webster 10; PIR: Jankūnas 20	Boxscore	Pts: Petrilevičius 18; Rebs: Guščikas 7 Asts: Johnson 6 PIR: Petrilevičius 20	Arena: Žalgiris Arena; Attendance: 1210; Referees: Saulius Račys, Gvidas Gedvilas, Darius Šomka

16 February 2022 21	Pieno žvaigždės	83–102	Žalgiris	Pasvalys
18:50 (EET)	Scoring by quarter: 17–25, 23–26, 23–27, 20–24
BTV; Go3	Pts: Johnson 18; Rebs: Beručka, Petrilevičius 4 Asts: Beručka, Johnson 5 PIR: Johnson 22	Boxscore	Pts: Ulanovas 24; Rebs: three players Asts: Lekavičius 7 PIR: Ulanovas 32	Arena: Pieno žvaigždės Arena; Attendance: 1000; Referees: Artūras Šukys, Juozas Barkauskas, Gabrielius Simonavičius

7 March 2022 22	Dzūkija	63–74	Žalgiris	Alytus
18:00 (EET)	Scoring by quarter: 14–17, 13–14, 25–24, 11–19
Go3	Pts: Lukauskis 12; Rebs: Aranitović 6 Asts: Aranitović, Zigmantavičius 3 PIR: Aranitović 15	Boxscore	Pts: Lekavičius 15; Rebs: Jankūnas 9 Asts: Lekavičius, Strēlnieks 5 PIR: Jankūnas 20	Arena: Alytus Sports and Recreation Center; Attendance: 780; Referees: Tomas Jasevičius, Vilius Mačiulaitis, Šarūnas Gabrilavičius

13 March 2022 23	Žalgiris	93–70	Cbet Jonava	Kaunas
17:20 (EET)	Scoring by quarter: 28–23, 24–20, 19–19, 22–8
Go3	Pts: Lauvergne 21; Rebs: Miniotas 12; Asts: Strēlnieks 6 PIR: Lauvergne 25	Boxscore	Pts: Kozys 21; Rebs: Kozys, Palacios 4 Asts: Lecomte 6 PIR: Kozys 22	Arena: Žalgiris Arena; Attendance: 1562; Referees: Gytis Vilius, Gintaras Vitkauskas, Martynas Karaliūnas

28 March 2022 24	Rytas	87–74	Žalgiris	Vilnius
18:50 (EEST)	Scoring by quarter: 17–19, 25–12, 20–26, 25–17
Go3	Pts: Buva 18; Rebs: three players 5 Asts: Smith 8 PIR: Buva 20	Boxscore	Pts: Cavanaugh 12; Rebs: Ulanovas 6 Asts: Ulanovas 5 PIR: Ulanovas 15	Arena: Avia Solutions Group Arena; Referees: Tomas Jasevičius, Artūras Šukys, Gvidas Gedvilas

10 April 2022 25	Cbet Jonava	100–97(OT)	Žalgiris	Jonava
17:20 (EEST)	Scoring by quarter: 24–24, 9–21, 24–21, 30–21, Overtime: 13–10
Go3	Pts: Lecomte 33; Rebs: Kozys, Palacios 7 Asts: Kozys 6 PIR: Lecomte 36	Boxscore	Pts: Cavanaugh 23; Rebs: Ulanovas 10; Asts: Lekavičius 7 PIR: Ulanovas 28	Arena: Jonava Arena; Attendance: 1521; Referees: Jurgis Laurinavičius, Gintaras Mačiulis, Aurimas Borusas

14 April 2022 26	Nevėžis-OPTIBET	64–72	Žalgiris	Kėdainiai
18:50 (EEST)	Scoring by quarter: 16–19, 13–15, 14–20, 21–18
Go3	Pts: Stenionis 15; Rebs: Sylla 10; Asts: Stenionis 5 PIR: Sylla 22	Boxscore	Pts: Ulanovas 12; Rebs: Cavanaugh 11; Asts: Miniotas, Webster 4 PIR: Ulanovas 20	Arena: Kėdainiai Arena; Attendance: 730; Referees: Tomas Jasevičius, Gintaras Vitkauskas, Šarūnas Gabrilavičius

16 April 2022 27	Žalgiris	90–74	Šiauliai-7bet	Kaunas
17:20 (EEST)	Scoring by quarter: 20–19, 29–24, 19–16, 22–15
Go3	Pts: Webster 14; Rebs: Ulanovas 8 Asts: Ulanovas 8 PIR: Ulanovas 24	Boxscore	Pts: Armwood 16; Rebs: Staniulis, Urbutis 6 Asts: Issuf Sanon, Martynas Varnas 4 PIR: Armwood 20	Arena: Žalgiris Arena; Attendance: 2392; Referees: Gytis Vilius, Gvidas Gedvilas, Vilius Mačiulaitis

20 April 2022 28	Neptūnas	57–77	Žalgiris	Klaipėda
18:50 (EEST)	Scoring by quarter: 19–21, 13–17, 14–19, 11–20
Go3	Pts: Gailius 16; Rebs: Griciūnas 7 Asts: Janavičius 5 PIR: Gailius 24	Boxscore	Pts: Miniotas, Ulanovas 12; Rebs: Strēlnieks 6 Asts: Lekavičius, Webster 4 PIR: Miniotas 19	Arena: Švyturys Arena; Attendance: 2262; Referees: Tomas Jasevičius, Jurgis Laurinavičius, Gabrielius Simonavičius

24 April 2022 29	Lietkabelis	85–67	Žalgiris	Panevėžys
17:20 (EEST)	Scoring by quarter: 24–16, 32–16, 17–22, 12–13
Go3	Pts: Orelik 16; Rebs: Maldūnas 7 Asts: Žemaitis 9 PIR: Kalaitzakis 22	Boxscore	Pts: Lauvergne 14; Rebs: Giffey 6 Asts: Miniotas 6 PIR: Ulanovas 17	Arena: Cido Arena; Attendance: 3124; Referees: Gytis Vilius, Saulius Račys, Gvidas Gedvilas

27 April 2022 30	Uniclub Casino – Juventus	76–84	Žalgiris	Utena
18:50 (EEST)	Scoring by quarter: 19–21, 17–14, 18–24, 22–25
Go3	Pts: Gustys 26; Rebs: Gustys 9 Asts: Vaitkus 6 PIR: Gustys 34	Boxscore	Pts: Ulanovas 16; Rebs: Cavanaugh 7 Asts: Lekavičius 6 PIR: Lekavičius 13	Arena: Utena Arena; Attendance: 1611; Referees: Artūras Šukys, Gintaras Mačiulis, Andžej Urbanovič

==== Playoffs ====
2 May 2022 Quarter-finals 1	Žalgiris	92–88 (Series: 1–0)	Neptūnas	Kaunas
18:50 (EEST)	Scoring by quarter: 22–17, 26–23, 28–14, 16–34
Go3	Pts: Lukošiūnas 23; Rebs: Ulanovas 9 Asts: Lekavičius 6 PIR: Ulanovas 27	Boxscore	Pts: Gailius 23; Rebs: Želionis 9 Asts: Janavičius 11; PIR: Gailius 23	Arena: Žalgiris Arena; Attendance: 1383; Referees: Jurgis Laurinavičius, Gintaras Mačiulis, Aurimas Borusas

4 May 2022 Quarter-finals 2	Neptūnas	70–68 (Series: 1–1)	Žalgiris	Klaipėda
18:00 (EEST)	Scoring by quarter: 15–19, 23–19, 11–10, 21–20
Go3	Pts: Janavičius 21; Rebs: Griciūnas 9 Asts: Gailius, Janavičius 6 PIR: Griciūnas 24	Boxscore	Pts: Lekavičius 17; Rebs: Miniotas, Nebo 4 Asts: Lekavičius 4 PIR: Lekavičius 28	Arena: Švyturys Arena; Attendance: 2117; Referees: Tomas Jasevičius, Gvidas Gedvilas, Juozas Barkauskas

7 May 2022 Quarter-finals 3	Žalgiris	87–71 (Series: 2–1)	Neptūnas	Kaunas
19:00 (EEST)	Scoring by quarter: 20–11, 31–22, 23–19, 13–19
Go3	Pts: Lekavičius 26; Rebs: Cavanaugh 6 Asts: Webster 5 PIR: Lekavičius 34	Boxscore	Pts: Griciūnas 14; Rebs: Griciūnas 7 Asts: Janavičius 3 PIR: Griciūnas 15	Arena: Garliavos sporto ir sveikatingumo kompleksas Attendance: 1000; Referees: Gytis Vilius, Artūras Šukys, Gintaras Vitkauskas

9 May 2022 Quarter-finals 4	Neptūnas	87–78 (Series: 2–2)	Žalgiris	Klaipėda
18:50 (EEST)	Scoring by quarter: 21–17, 20–14, 12–15, 34–32
Go3	Pts: Mineikis 23; Rebs: Griciūnas 10; Asts: Jogėla 9 PIR: Mineikis 27	Boxscore	Pts: Lekavičius 19; Rebs: Giffey, Lauvergne 6 Asts: Kalnietis 7 PIR: Lekavičius 19	Arena: Švyturys Arena; Attendance: 2578; Referees: Gytis Vilius, Saulius Račys, Gvidas Gedvilas

11 May 2022 Quarter-finals 5	Žalgiris	89–60 (Series: 3–2)	Neptūnas	Kaunas
18:50 (EEST)	Scoring by quarter: 23–14, 16–13, 33–17, 17–16
Go3	Pts: Giffey 15; Rebs: Cavanaugh, Giffey 5 Asts: Cavanaugh 4 PIR: Giffey 23	Boxscore	Pts: Gailius 15; Rebs: Griciūnas 6 Asts: five players 3 PIR: Gailius, Jucikas 11	Arena: Žalgiris Arena; Attendance: 3831; Referees: Tomas Jasevičius, Jurgis Laurinavičius, Artūras Šukys

14 May 2022 Semi-finals 1	Žalgiris	71–70 (Series: 1–0)	Lietkabelis	Kaunas
17:20 (EEST)	Scoring by quarter: 16–19, 18–17, 21–20, 16–14
BTV; Go3	Pts: Webster 14; Rebs: Nebo 7 Asts: Kalnietis, Jankūnas 4 PIR: Webster 14	Boxscore	Pts: Orelik, Gagić 19; Rebs: Orelik 7 Asts: Orelik 4 PIR: Orelik 26	Arena: Žalgiris Arena; Attendance: 3678; Referees: Tomas Jasevičius, Saulius Račys, Jurgis Laurinavičius

16 May 2022 Semi-finals 2	Lietkabelis	79–55 (Series: 1–1)	Žalgiris	Panevėžys
18:50 (EEST)	Scoring by quarter: 20–16, 28–11, 14–16, 17–12
BTV; Go3	Pts: Vytenis Lipkevičius 21; Rebs: Kalaitzakis 10; Asts: Orelik 7 PIR: Vytenis Lipkevičius 24	Boxscore	Pts: Nebo 16; Rebs: Giffey 7 Asts: Kalnietis 6 PIR: Nebo 16	Arena: Cido Arena; Attendance: 4256; Referees: Gytis Vilius, Tomas Jasevičius, Artūras Šukys

19 May 2022 Semi-finals 3	Žalgiris	69–73 (Series: 1–2)	Lietkabelis	Kaunas
18:50 (EEST)	Scoring by quarter: 21–18, 22–14, 10–16, 16–25
BTV; Go3	Pts: Strēlnieks 15; Rebs: three players Asts: Lekavičius 7 PIR: Lekavičius 14	Boxscore	Pts: Kalaitzakis 18; Rebs: Gagić 8 Asts: Giedraitis 5 PIR: Giedraitis 21	Arena: Žalgiris Arena; Attendance: 4221; Referees: Jurgis Laurinavičius, Gintaras Vitkauskas, Gintaras Mačiulis

21 May 2022 Semi-finals 4	Lietkabelis	86–75 (Series: 3–1)	Žalgiris	Panevėžys
17:20 (EEST)	Scoring by quarter: 15–17, 28–15, 24–25, 19–18
BTV; Go3	Pts: Orelik 19; Rebs: Gagić 7 Asts: Kalaitzakis 4 PIR: Orelik 20	Boxscore	Pts: Lekavičius, Cavanaugh 14; Rebs: Ulanovas 6 Asts: Kalnietis 6 PIR: Lekavičius 18	Arena: Cido Arena; Attendance: 6480; Referees: Tomas Jasevičius, Saulius Račys, Artūras Šukys

25 May 2022 Third place 1	Žalgiris	92–75 (Series: 1–0)	Šiauliai–7bet	Kaunas
18:50 (EEST)	Scoring by quarter: 28–18, 29–21, 14–19, 21–17
BTV; Go3	Pts: three players Rebs: Nebo, Cavanaugh 7 Asts: Lekavičius 7 PIR: Cavanaugh 20	Boxscore	Pts: Staniulis 17; Rebs: Staniulis 9 Asts: Sabeckis 5 PIR: Staniulis 19	Arena: Žalgiris Arena; Attendance: 1316; Referees: Tomas Jasevičius, Jurgis Laurinavičius, Saulius Račys

28 May 2022 Third place 2	Šiauliai–7bet	85–90(OT) (Series: 0–2)	Žalgiris	Šiauliai
17:20 (EEST)	Scoring by quarter: 17–26, 18–17, 27–17, 18–20, Overtime: 5–10
BTV; Go3	Pts: Varnas, Bezbradica 16; Rebs: Staniulis 9 Asts: Sabeckis 8 PIR: Bezbradica 21	Boxscore	Pts: Ulanovas 16; Rebs: Ulanovas 7 Asts: Kalnietis, Lekavičius 5 PIR: Ulanovas 20	Arena: Šiauliai Arena; Attendance: 3945; Referees: Artūras Šukys, Gvidas Gedvilas, Gintaras Vitkauskas

31 May 2022 Third place 3	Žalgiris	85–70 (Series: 3–0)	Šiauliai–7bet	Kaunas
18:50 (EEST)	Scoring by quarter: 24–15, 27–20, 14–18, 20–17
BTV; Go3	Pts: Blaževič 15; Rebs: Nebo 6 Asts: Strēlnieks; PIR: Nebo 16	Boxscore	Pts: Sabeckis 13; Rebs: Sabeckis, Staniulis 5 Asts: Sabeckis 7 PIR: Sabeckis 16	Arena: Žalgiris Arena; Attendance: 2043; Referees: Gytis Vilius, Jurgis Laurinavičius, Gintaras Mačiulis

3 June 2022 Third place 4	Šiauliai–7bet	76–89 (Series: 0–4)	Žalgiris	Šiauliai
18:50 (EEST)	Scoring by quarter: 26–23, 14–21, 15–23, 21–22
BTV; Go3	Pts: Sabeckis 23; Rebs: Issuf Sanon 6 Asts: Varnas 6 PIR: Sabeckis 19	Boxscore	Pts: Blaževič 17; Rebs: Blaževič 12; Asts: Lekavičius 6 PIR: Lekavičius 29	Arena: Šiauliai Arena; Attendance: 3878; Referees: Gytis Vilius, Jurgis Laurinavičius, Gvidas Gedvilas

=== EuroLeague ===
==== Regular season ====
Pos	Team	Pld	W	L	PF	PA	PD	Qualification
13	(Hellenic Basketball Federation) Panathinaikos OPAP	28	9	19	2089	2235	−146	
14	(French Federation of Basketball) LDLC ASVEL	28	8	20	2036	2239	−203	
15	(Lithuanian Basketball Federation) Žalgiris	28	8	20	2084	2249	−165	
16	(Russian Basketball Federation) Zenit Saint Petersburg	0	0	0	0	0	0	Excluded
17	(Russian Basketball Federation) CSKA Moscow	0	0	0	0	0	0	Excluded

Source: EuroLeague
Rules for classification: All points scored in extra period(s) were not counted in the standings, nor for any tie-break situation.

==== Results summary ====
Overall						Home					Away				
Pld	W	L	PF	PA	PD	W	L	PF	PA	PD	W	L	PF	PA	PD
28	8	20	2084	2249	−165	6	8	1080	1089	−9	2	12	1004	1160	−156

Last updated: 4 April 2022.
Source: Competitive matches

==== Results by round ====
Round	1	2	3	4	5	6	7	8	9	10	11	12	13	14	15	16	17	18	19	20	21	22	23	24	25	26	27	28	29	30	31	32	33	34
Ground	A	H	A	A	H	A	A	H	A	H	H	A	H	H	H	A	H	A	H	A	H	A	A	H	H	A	H	A	H	H	H	A	A	A
Result	L	AN	L	L	L	L	L	L	L	W	W	L	W	AN	L	AN	L	W	W	L	W	L	L	L	AN	W	W	L	W	L	L	NP	L	NP
Position	15	16	18	18	18	18	18	18	18	18	18	18	18	18	18	18	18	18	18	18	18	18	18	18	18	18	18	18	18	18	18	15	15	15

Source: Competitive matches
A = Away; H = Home; W = Win; L = Loss; AN = Annulated; NP = Not Played

==== Matches ====
1 October 2021 1	LDLC ASVEL (France)	88–76	(Lithuania) Žalgiris	Villeurbanne
20:00 (CEST)	Scoring by quarter: 19–16, 25–20, 19–19, 25–21
	Pts: Okobo 23; Rebs: Fall 9 Asts: Jones 6 PIR: Okobo 24	Boxscore	Pts: Strēlnieks 21; Rebs: Giffey 7 Asts: Cavanaugh 3 PIR: Strēlnieks 23	Arena: Astroballe; Attendance: 4215; Referees: Saša Pukl, Anne Panther, Carlos Cortés

7 October 2021 2	Žalgiris (Lithuania)	64–70	(Russia) Zenit Saint Petersburg	Kaunas
20:00 (EEST)	Scoring by quarter: 16–21, 18–19, 17–15, 13–15
	Pts: Strēlnieks 14; Rebs: Jankūnas 7 Asts: Lekavičius 6 PIR: Nebo 14	Boxscore	Pts: Loyd 19; Rebs: Mickey, Ponitka 6 Asts: Ponitka 6 PIR: Loyd 19	Arena: Žalgiris Arena; Attendance: 10153; Referees: Damir Javor, Elias Koromilas, Gentian Cici

13 October 2021 3	Crvena zvezda (Serbia)	73–61	(Lithuania) Žalgiris	Belgrade
19:00 (CEST)	Scoring by quarter: 13–14, 16–13, 17–15, 27–19
	Pts: Kalinić 15; Rebs: Mitrović 7 Asts: Wolters 7 PIR: Kalinić 19	Boxscore	Pts: Nebo 14; Rebs: Nebo 10; Asts: Strēlnieks 4 PIR: Nebo 24	Arena: Štark Arena; Attendance: 7893; Referees: Juan Carlos García González, Emin Moğulkoç, Robert Vyklický

15 October 2021 4	Olympiacos (Greece)	83–68	(Lithuania) Žalgiris	Piraeus
21:00 (EEST)	Scoring by quarter: 12–23, 24–16, 27–10, 20–19
	Pts: Sloukas 17; Rebs: Printezis 7 Asts: Walkup 4 PIR: Sloukas 19	Boxscore	Pts: Mudiay 19; Rebs: Blaževič 8 Asts: Kalnietis 7 PIR: Mudiay 16	Arena: Peace and Friendship Stadium; Attendance: 6835; Referees: Luigi Lamonica, Uroš Obrknežević, Seffi Shemmesh

21 October 2021 5	Žalgiris (Lithuania)	73–75	(Germany) Bayern Munich	Kaunas
20:00 (EEST)	Scoring by quarter: 24–13, 15–14, 16–25, 18–23
	Pts: Lekavičius 17; Rebs: Nebo 13; Asts: Kalnietis 6 PIR: Nebo 21	Boxscore	Pts: Lučić 17; Rebs: Rubit 7 Asts: Walden 5 PIR: Lučić 20	Arena: Žalgiris Arena; Attendance: 9057; Referees: Ilija Belošević, Leandro Lezcano, Josip Radojković

26 October 2021 6	Maccabi Tel Aviv (Israel)	76–62	(Lithuania) Žalgiris	Tel Aviv
21:05 (IST)	Scoring by quarter: 16–20, 23–10, 19–16, 18–16
	Pts: Williams 17; Rebs: Žižić 9 Asts: Wilbekin 6 PIR: Williams 23	Boxscore	Pts: Milaknis 17; Rebs: Nebo 9 Asts: Lekavičius, Mudiay 5 PIR: Nebo 16	Arena: Menora Mivtachim Arena; Attendance: 9745; Referees: Damir Javor, Jordi Aliaga Solé, Kristaps Konstantinovs

29 October 2021 7	Anadolu Efes (Turkey)	94–60	(Lithuania) Žalgiris	Istanbul
20:35 (TT)	Scoring by quarter: 24–17, 20–12, 25–17, 25–14
	Pts: Pleiß 17; Rebs: 3 players 7 Asts: 4 players 4 PIR: Pleiß 22	Boxscore	Pts: Lekavičius, Milaknis 14; Rebs: 3 players 4 Asts: Kalnietis 5 PIR: Milaknis 12	Arena: Sinan Erdem Dome; Attendance: 5218; Referees: Daniel Hierrezuelo Navas, Milivoje Jovčić, Elias Koromilas

5 November 2021 8	Žalgiris (Lithuania)	71–79	(Germany) ALBA Berlin	Kaunas
20:00 (EET)	Scoring by quarter: 10–22, 27–19, 15–21, 19–17
	Pts: Cavanaugh 17; Rebs: Cavanaugh, Nebo 6 Asts: Lekavičius, Strēlnieks 4 PIR: Cavanaugh 14	Boxscore	Pts: Eriksson 16; Rebs: Sikma 6 Asts: Blatt, Lô 6 PIR: Sikma 23	Arena: Žalgiris Arena; Attendance: 8170; Referees: Mehdi Difallah, Emin Moğulkoç, Sebastien Clivaz

12 November 2021 9	Real Madrid (Spain)	95–82	(Lithuania) Žalgiris	Madrid
20:45 (CET)	Scoring by quarter: 20–11, 31–34, 24–25, 20–12
	Pts: Yabusele 15; Rebs: Tavares, Yabusele 6 Asts: Heurtel 5 PIR: Poirier 23	Boxscore	Pts: Cavanaugh 14; Rebs: 3 players 4 Asts: Lekavičius 10; PIR: Lekavičius 17	Arena: WiZink Center; Attendance: 6798; Referees: Robert Lottermoser, Michele Rossi, Sergio Silva

16 November 2021 10	Žalgiris (Lithuania)	76–69	(Greece) Panathinaikos OPAP	Kaunas
20:00 (EET)	Scoring by quarter: 20–12, 23–25, 17–15, 16–17
	Pts: Milaknis 13; Rebs: Cavanaugh 9 Asts: Kalnietis 5 PIR: Ulanovas 23	Boxscore	Pts: Macon 21; Rebs: three players 6 Asts: three players 3 PIR: Macon 23	Arena: Žalgiris Arena; Attendance: 6,383; Referees: Sreten Radović, Emilio Pérez, Eduard Udyanskyy

19 November 2021 11	Žalgiris (Lithuania)	86–75	(Turkey) Fenerbahçe Beko	Kaunas
20:45 (EET)	Scoring by quarter: 16–18, 22–11, 26–30, 22–16
	Pts: Ulanovas 18; Rebs: Nebo 7 Asts: Kalnietis 11; PIR: Ulanovas 21	Boxscore	Pts: de Colo 17; Rebs: Henry 5 Asts: de Colo 5 PIR: de Colo 26	Arena: Žalgiris Arena; Attendance: 10067; Referees: Luigi Lamonica, Piotr Pastusiak, Gentian Cici

26 November 2021 12	Barcelona (Spain)	96–73	(Lithuania) Žalgiris	Barcelona
21:00 (CET)	Scoring by quarter: 24–17, 28–21, 23–20, 21–15
	Pts: Jokubaitis 15; Rebs: Oriola 9 Asts: Laprovíttola 8 PIR: Oriola 25	Boxscore	Pts: Webster 13; Rebs: Ulanovas 6 Asts: Kalnietis, Webster 4 PIR: Webster 14	Arena: Palau Blaugrana; Attendance: 4808; Referees: Matej Boltauzer, Fernando Rocha, Luka Kardum

2 December 2021 13	Žalgiris (Lithuania)	72–68	(Spain) Bitci Baskonia	Kaunas
20:00 (EET)	Scoring by quarter: 21–19, 19–13, 11–14, 21–22
	Pts: Lekavičius 13; Rebs: Cavanaugh 9 Asts: Lekavičius 9 PIR: Lekavičius 23	Boxscore	Pts: Enoch 13; Rebs: Enoch 10; Asts: Granger 6 PIR: Enoch 23	Arena: Žalgiris Arena; Attendance: 7,335; Referees: Borys Ryzhyk, Elias Koromilas, Igor Dragojević

10 December 2021 14	Žalgiris (Lithuania)	51–73	(Russia) CSKA Moscow	Kaunas
20:00 (EET)	Scoring by quarter: 18–19, 10–11, 11–27, 12–16
	Pts: Nebo 11; Rebs: Nebo 7 Asts: Lekavičius 5 PIR: Nebo 21	Boxscore	Pts: Milutinov 19; Rebs: Milutinov 12; Asts: Shengelia 4 PIR: Milutinov 36	Arena: Žalgiris Arena; Attendance: 12345; Referees: Robert Lottermoser, Emilio Pérez, Tomasz Trawicki

15 December 2021 15	Žalgiris (Lithuania)	98–107(OT)	AS Monaco	Kaunas
20:00 (EET)	Scoring by quarter: 21–22, 22–26, 27–13, 25–34, Overtime: 3–12
	Pts: Strēlnieks 22; Rebs: Cavanaugh, Nebo 9 Asts: Lekavičius 6 PIR: Strēlnieks 21	Boxscore	Pts: James 20; Rebs: Hall 8 Asts: James 14; PIR: James 31	Arena: Žalgiris Arena; Attendance: 7472; Referees: Milivoje Jovčić, Leandro Lezcano, Michele Rossi

17 December 2021 16	UNICS (Russia)	66–53	(Lithuania) Žalgiris	Kazan
19:00 (MST)	Scoring by quarter: 13–12, 13–11, 16–19, 24–11
	Pts: Hezonja 20; Rebs: Jekiri 9 Asts: Brown; PIR: Hezonja 22	Boxscore	Pts: Blaževič, Strēlnieks 9 Rebs: Nebo 7 Asts: Webster 6 PIR: Nebo 17	Arena: Basket-Hall Kazan; Attendance: 1831; Referees: Sreten Radović, Juan Carlos García González, Uroš Nikolić

11 January 2022 20	Bayern Munich (Germany)	74–65	(Lithuania) Žalgiris	Munich
20:30 (CET)	Scoring by quarter: 16–15, 18–18, 27–21, 13–11
	Pts: Ognjen Jaramaz 16; Rebs: Augustine Rubit 7 Asts: Corey Walden 5 PIR: Ognjen Jaramaz 20	Boxscore	Pts: Nebo 14; Rebs: Nebo 9 Asts: Kalnietis, Lekavičius 3 PIR: Nebo 22	Arena: Audi Dome; Attendance: 0 Referees: Damir Javor, Piotr Pastusiak, Robert Vyklický

20 January 2022 22	Fenerbahçe Beko (Turkey)	73–67	(Lithuania) Žalgiris	Istanbul
20:45 (TT)	Scoring by quarter: 7–13, 17–17, 20–21, 29–16
	Pts: Gudurić 19; Rebs: Polonara 8 Asts: Gudurić 5 PIR: Gudurić 27	Boxscore	Pts: Ulanovas 16; Rebs: Cavanaugh 13; Asts: Blaževič, Kalnietis 4 PIR: Blaževič 19	Arena: Ülker Sports and Event Hall; Attendance: 3813; Referees: Juan Carlos García González, Carmelo Paternicò, Luka Kardum

28 January 2022 23	A|X Armani Exchange Milan (Italy)	65–58	(Lithuania) Žalgiris	Milan
20:30 (CET)	Scoring by quarter: 20–20, 19–10, 15–15, 11–13
	Pts: Daniels, Hall 12; Rebs: Hines 6 Asts: Hines, Hall 4 PIR: Hines 22	Boxscore	Pts: Blaževič, Lekavičius 13; Rebs: Ulanovas 8 Asts: Lekavičius, Ulanovas 4 PIR: three players 10	Arena: Mediolanum Forum; Attendance: 3067; Referees: Borys Ryzhyk, Tomislav Hordov, Igor Dragojević

1 February 2022 24	Žalgiris (Lithuania)	78–94	(Israel) Maccabi Tel Aviv	Kaunas
20:00 (EET)	Scoring by quarter: 19–21, 28–26, 13–17, 18–30
	Pts: Blaževič 20; Rebs: Ulanovas 6 Asts: Lekavičius 9 PIR: Blaževič 26	Boxscore	Pts: Nunnally 32; Rebs: Evans, Reynolds 5 Asts: Evans, Wilbekin 6 PIR: Nunnally 38	Arena: Žalgiris Arena; Attendance: 4863; Referees: Daniel Hierrezuelo Navas, Joseph Bissang, Rain Peerandi

4 February 2022 25	Žalgiris (Lithuania)	67–76	(Russia) UNICS	Kaunas
20:00 (EET)	Scoring by quarter: 26–24, 13–21, 15–18, 13–13
	Pts: Ulanovas 16; Rebs: Ulanovas 7 Asts: Lekavičius 3 PIR: Lekavičius, Ulanovas 20	Boxscore	Pts: L. Brown 19; Rebs: J. Brown 11; Asts: L. Brown 10; PIR: J. Brown 23	Arena: Žalgiris Arena; Attendance: 5307; Referees: Luigi Lamonica, Emilio Pérez, Amit Balak

8 February 2022 17	Žalgiris (Lithuania)	70–74	(Italy) A|X Armani Exchange Milan	Kaunas
20:00 (EET)	Scoring by quarter: 18–17, 17–18, 16–18, 19–21
	Pts: Lekavičius 16; Rebs: Cavanaugh 6 Asts: Webster 6 PIR: Lekavičius 23	Boxscore	Pts: Delaney 20; Rebs: Hines, Melli 10; Asts: Hall, Rodríguez 5 PIR: Hines 21	Arena: Žalgiris Arena; Attendance: 5198; Referees: Miguel Ángel Pérez, Mehdi Difallah, Seffi Shemmesh

10 February 2022 26	AS Monaco	82–83	(Lithuania) Žalgiris	Monaco
20:00 (CET)	Scoring by quarter: 23–18, 23–18, 18–25, 18–22
	Pts: Bacon, James 18; Rebs: Motiejūnas 6 Asts: James 4 PIR: Bacon 18	Boxscore	Pts: Giffey 15; Rebs: Ulanovas 6 Asts: Lekavičius 6 PIR: Giffey 23	Arena: Salle Gaston Médecin; Attendance: 3259; Referees: Milivoje Jovčić, Jordi Aliaga Solé, Kristaps Konstantinovs

24 February 2022 27	Žalgiris (Lithuania)	68–47	(Spain) Real Madrid	Kaunas
20:00 (EET)	Scoring by quarter: 18–11, 20–18, 11–8, 19–10
	Pts: Ulanovas 15; Rebs: Nebo 9 Asts: Lekavičius 4 PIR: Ulanovas 17	Boxscore	Pts: Tavares 12; Rebs: Tavares 12; Asts: Llull 4 PIR: Tavares 20	Arena: Žalgiris Arena; Attendance: 6589; Referees: Emin Moğulkoç, Uroš Nikolić, Igor Dragojević

1 March 2022 18	Panathinaikos OPAP (Greece)	83–96	(Lithuania) Žalgiris	Athens
21:00 (EET)	Scoring by quarter: 10–29, 24–23, 27–24, 22–20
	Pts: Nedović 23; Rebs: Papagiannis 7 Asts: Macon 7 PIR: Nedović 25	Boxscore	Pts: Ulanovas 22; Rebs: Lauvergne 12; Asts: Lekavičius 5 PIR: Ulanovas 29	Arena: OAKA Altion; Attendance: 1815; Referees: Carlos Peruga Embid, Amit Balak, Luka Kardum

3 March 2022 28	ALBA Berlin (Germany)	82–74	(Lithuania) Žalgiris	Berlin
20:00 (CET)	Scoring by quarter: 24–24, 20–6, 15–20, 23–24
	Pts: Thiemann 17; Rebs: Koumadje 6 Asts: Blatt 7 PIR: Thiemann 18	Boxscore	Pts: Cavanaugh 18; Rebs: Nebo 8 Asts: Strēlnieks 9 PIR: Nebo 26	Arena: Mercedes-Benz Arena; Attendance: 2798; Referees: Oļegs Latiševs, Michele Rossi, Damir Javor

11 March 2022 29	Žalgiris (Lithuania)	91–84	(Spain) Barcelona	Kaunas
20:00 (EET)	Scoring by quarter: 9–17, 26–18, 21–28, 35–21
	Pts: Lekavičius 22; Rebs: Ulanovas 9 Asts: Lekavičius, Milaknis 4 PIR: Ulanovas 33	Boxscore	Pts: Mirotić 26; Rebs: Mirotić, Şanlı; Asts: Calathes 9 PIR: Mirotić 26	Arena: Žalgiris Arena; Attendance: 12686; Referees: Mehdi Difallah, Carmelo Paternicò, Seffi Shemmesh

15 March 2022 19	Žalgiris (Lithuania)	73–84	(Greece) Olympiacos	Kaunas
20:00 (EET)	Scoring by quarter: 20–15, 19–24, 20–19, 14–26
	Pts: Nebo 17; Rebs: Nebo 10; Asts: Ulanovas 6 PIR: Nebo, Ulanovas 25	Boxscore	Pts: Papanikolaou 18; Rebs: Martin 7 Asts: Sloukas 6 PIR: Papanikolaou 23	Arena: Žalgiris Arena; Attendance: 7369; Referees: Benjamín Jiménez Trujillo, Milivoje Jovčić, Michele Rossi

17 March 2022 30	Žalgiris (Lithuania)	71–85	(Turkey) Anadolu Efes	Kaunas
20:00 (EET)	Scoring by quarter: 19–23, 11–18, 10–24, 31–20
	Pts: Cavanaugh 22; Rebs: Nebo 8 Asts: Ulanovas 5 PIR: Cavanaugh 25	Boxscore	Pts: Micić 20; Rebs: Anderson 7 Asts: Larkin 8 PIR: Micić 21	Arena: Žalgiris Arena; Attendance: 6146; Referees: Ilija Belošević, Emilio Pérez, Josip Radojković

23 March 2022 31	Žalgiris (Lithuania)	68–72	(France) LDLC ASVEL	Kaunas
20:00 (EET)	Scoring by quarter: 17–15, 15–18, 15–16, 21–23
	Pts: Ulanovas 15; Rebs: Nebo 6 Asts: Lekavičius, Ulanovas 5 PIR: Ulanovas 18	Boxscore	Pts: Okobo 21; Rebs: Wembanyama 5 Asts: Okobo 5 PIR: Okobo 26	Arena: Žalgiris Arena; Attendance: 5289; Referees: Juan Carlos García González, Anne Panther, Luka Kardum

25 March 2022 32	CSKA Moscow (Russia)	Not played	(Lithuania) Žalgiris	Moscow
20:00 (MST)
		Boxscore		Arena: Megasport Arena

1 April 2022 33	Bitci Baskonia (Spain)	96–79	(Lithuania) Žalgiris	Vitoria-Gasteiz
20:30 (CEST)	Scoring by quarter: 35–15, 22–25, 20–10, 19–29
	Pts: Enoch 18; Rebs: Sedekerskis 8 Asts: Granger 9 PIR: Giedraitis 24	Boxscore	Pts: Lekavičius 20; Rebs: Nebo 8 Asts: Ulanovas 6 PIR: Lekavičius 22	Arena: Buesa Arena; Attendance: 6373; Referees: Luigi Lamonica, Fernando Rocha, Mario Majkić

3 April 2022 21	Žalgiris (Lithuania)	103–98(OT)	(Serbia) Crvena zvezda mts	Kaunas
20:00 (EEST)	Scoring by quarter: 23–14, 22–18, 15–35, 28–21, Overtime: 15–10
	Pts: Ulanovas 18; Rebs: Jankūnas, Ulanovas 7 Asts: Lekavičius 7 PIR: Lekavičius 26	Boxscore	Pts: Dobrić 21; Rebs: Kalinić 7 Asts: Wolters 7 PIR: Dobrić 23	Arena: Žalgiris Arena; Attendance: 10206; Referees: Sreten Radović, Hugues Thépénier, Marcin Kowalski

8 April 2022 34	Zenit Saint Petersburg (Russia)	Not played	(Lithuania) Žalgiris	Saint Petersburg
21:00 (MST)
		Boxscore		Arena: Sibur Arena
