= Smajlagić =

Smajlagić or Smailagić is a surname. Notable people with the surname include:

- Alen Smailagić (born 2000), Serbian professional basketball player
- Ervin Smajlagić (born 1976), Bosnian footballer
- Irfan Smajlagić (born 1961), Bosnian-born Croatian handball player and coach
- Semir Smajlagić (born 1998), Bosnian footballer
- Sven Smajlagić (born 1990), Croatian professional basketball player
