= 2021–22 LKL season =

29th season of the top-tier level professional basketball league of Lithuania

Betsafe-LKL
- Season: 2021–22
- Duration: 18 September 2021 – 28 April 2022 (Regular season); 1 May 2022 – 12 June 2022 (Playoffs)
- Games played: 198
- Teams: 11

Regular season
- Season MVP: (Croatia) Ivan Buva

Finals
- Champions: Rytas (6th title)
- Runners-up: Lietkabelis
- Third place: Žalgiris
- Fourth place: Šiauliai–7bet
- Finals MVP: (Lithuania) Arnas Butkevičius

Statistical leaders
Points	(United States) Patrick Miller	17.93
Rebounds	(Senegal) Amar Sylla	7.62
Assists	(Lithuania) Žygimantas Janavičius	6.84
Index Rating	(Croatia) Ivan Buva	18.41

Records
- Biggest home win: Rytas 108–68 Nevėžis–OPTIBET (13 February 2022)
- Biggest away win: Šiauliai–7bet 64–97 Žalgiris (17 October 2021)
- Highest scoring: Pieno žvaigždės 106–102 Labas Gas (27 March 2022)
- Winning streak: 14 games Žalgiris
- Losing streak: 11 games Labas Gas
- Highest attendance: 9,006; Rytas 67–72 Žalgiris (23 January 2022)
- Lowest attendance: 130; Labas Gas 63–73 Neptūnas (7 February 2022)
- Average attendance: 1,239 per match

Seasons
- ← 2020–21 2022–23 →

The 2021–22 Lietuvos krepšinio lyga, also called Betsafe-LKL for sponsorship reasons, was the 29th season of the top-tier level professional basketball league of Lithuania, the Lietuvos krepšinio lyga (LKL). Žalgiris was defending champions.

For the first time since league's inception, Žalgiris failed to reach finals, after losing semifinal series to Lietkabelis 3–1

Rytas after 12 years break won Betsafe–LKL championship and achieved their 6th title overall.

== Teams ==
=== Location and arenas ===
Location of teams in 2021-22 LKL

On 27 April 2021, during 2020–21 LKL season LKL board decided to expand the number of participating teams in tournament. The number of teams has been expanded to 11 teams. 2020-21 NKL season champions Cbet Jonava will join the other 10 LKL teams.

Team	Location	Arena	Capacity
Cbet Jonava	Jonava	Jonava Arena	2,200
Dzūkija	Alytus	Alytus Arena	5,500
Labas Gas	Prienai	Prienai Arena	1,500
Lietkabelis	Panevėžys	Cido Arena	5,950
Neptūnas	Klaipėda	Švyturys Arena	6,200
Nevėžis-OPTIBET	Kėdainiai	Kėdainiai Arena	2,200
Pieno žvaigždės	Pasvalys	Pieno žvaigždės Arena	1,500
Rytas	Vilnius	Jeep Arena	2,500
Rytas	Vilnius	Avia Solutions Group Arena	10,000
Šiauliai-7bet	Šiauliai	Šiauliai Arena	5,700
Uniclub Casino – Juventus	Utena	Utena Arena	2,000
Žalgiris	Kaunas	Žalgiris Arena	15,415

=== Managerial changes ===
Team	Outgoing manager	Manner of departure	Date of vacancy	Position in table	Replaced with	Date of appointment
Nevėžis–OPTIBET	(Lithuania) Marius Kiltinavičius	Signed by Sūduva-Mantinga	21 June 2021	Pre-season	(Lithuania) Gediminas Petrauskas	21 June 2021
Pieno žvaigždės	(Lithuania) Gediminas Petrauskas	Signed by Nevėžis–OPTIBET	21 June 2021	Pre-season	(Lithuania) Mantas Šernius	22 June 2021
Labas Gas	(Lithuania) Mantas Šernius	Signed by Pieno žvaigždės	22 June 2021	Pre-season	(Lithuania) Marius Leonavičius	16 August 2021
Dzūkija	(North Macedonia) Nikola Vasilev	Mutual consent	15 August 2021	Pre-season	(Lithuania) Ramūnas Cvirka	15 August 2021
Žalgiris	(Austria) Martin Schiller	Sacked	08 October 2021	1st (4–0)	(Slovenia) Jure Zdovc	08 October 2021
Neptūnas	(Lithuania) Tomas Gaidamavičius	Mutual consent	11 December 2021	9th (2–7)	(Lithuania) Dainius Adomaitis	18 December 2021
Uniclub Casino – Juventus	(Lithuania) Žydrūnas Urbonas	Resigned	30 March 2022	6th (11–12)		
Žalgiris	(Slovenia) Jure Zdovc	Mutual consent	11 April 2022	2nd (22–3)	(Lithuania) Kazys Maksvytis	11 April 2022

== Regular season ==
=== League table ===
Pos	Team	Pld	W	L	PF	PA	PD	Qualification or relegation
1	Rytas	30	26	4	2685	2257	+428	Advance to playoffs
2	Žalgiris	30	26	4	2578	2247	+331	Advance to playoffs
3	Lietkabelis	30	23	7	2522	2233	+289	Advance to playoffs
4	Cbet Jonava	30	16	14	2373	2451	−78	Advance to playoffs
5	Šiauliai–7bet	30	15	15	2459	2464	−5	Advance to playoffs
6	Uniclub Casino – Juventus	30	15	15	2526	2485	+41	Advance to playoffs
7	Neptūnas	30	14	16	2332	2390	−58	Advance to playoffs
8	Dzūkija	30	11	19	2291	2427	−136	Advance to playoffs
9	Pieno žvaigždės	30	9	21	2423	2615	−192	
10	Nevėžis-OPTIBET	30	7	23	2349	2635	−286	
11	Labas GAS	30	3	27	2310	2644	−334	

Source: LKL.lT

=== Results ===
Home \ Away	CBE	DZU	GAS	LTK	NEP	NEV	PIE	RYT	SIA	JUV	ZAL	CBE	DZU	GAS	LTK	NEP	NEV	PIE	RYT	SIA	JUV	ZAL
Cbet Jonava	—	85–63	93–77	74–66	64–89	88–76	77–69	79–94	58–69	86–80	80–86	—	—	100–84	—	—	—	91–82	67–91	62–79	65–71	100–97
Dzūkija	86–62	—	72–69	65–76	67–79	81–66	92–86	61–88	75–66	83–80	100–105	73–81	—	—	86–90	64–65	93–76	—	—	—	—	63–74
Labas GAS	68–81	70–77	—	65–92	62–87	93–102	79–87	68–82	88–109	80–74	78–81	—	62–72	—	—	63–73	86–97	—	—	—	88–81	71–88
Lietkabelis	88–69	94–63	87–69	—	83–62	60–67	88–70	83–80	87–76	92–89	69–73	103–71	—	82–73	—	—	—	82–87	86–90	71–66	—	85–67
Neptūnas	75–87	70–85	88–82	53–81	—	94–87	75–71	81–89	86–94	79–88	60–77	75–78	—	—	73–83	—	95–61	91–95	93–88	—	—	57–77
Nevėžis–OPTIBET	95–100	83–78	90–80	77–78	83–88	—	73–79	68–100	66–79	73–75	69–77	88–92	—	—	60–85	—	—	85–92	85–109	93–83	—	64–72
Pieno žvaigždės	76–80	75–81	78–81	97–107	69–82	87–88	—	66–76	108–90	76–90	69–85	—	101–78	106–102	—	—	—	—	—	67–89	92–84	83–102
Rytas	76–60	81–65	106–77	85–71	97–76	108–73	91–75	—	79–76	89–111	67–72	—	88–68	86–70	—	—	—	99–66	—	101–68	82–74	87–74
Šiauliai-7bet	93–87	97–85	86–80	74–97	75–77	91–77	84–62	77–89	—	80–66	64–97	—	84–83	96–93	—	84–87	—	—	—	—	91–94	86–89
Uniclub Casino – Juventus	89–86	101–84	88–75	75–92	76–64	94–77	94–82	92–103	70–79	—	71–78	—	95–78	—	93–94	82–79	96–73	—	—	—	—	76–84
Žalgiris	93–70	78–70	103–77	84–70	98–79	102–77	99–70	75–84	90–74	101–77	—	—	—	—	—	—	—	—	—	—	—	—

Source: LKL.LT
Legend: Blue = home team win; Red = away team win.
Matches with lighter background shading were decided after overtime.

== Playoffs ==
Quarterfinals and semifinals will be played in a best–of–five games format, while the finals and third place in a best–of–seven format.

=== Bracket ===
Quarterfinals
Rytas	76	73	87	92	–
Dzūkija	63	80	59	66	–
Cbet Jonava	82	66	70	65	–
Šiauliai–7bet	79	88	72	79	–
Žalgiris	92	68	87	78	89
Neptūnas	88	70	71	87	60
Lietkabelis	102	95	92	–	–
Uniclub Casino — Juventus	101	73	87	–	–

Semifinals
Rytas	97	72	94	87	–
Šiauliai–7bet	75	84	79	77	–
Žalgiris	71	55	69	75	–
Lietkabelis	70	79	73	86	–

Finals
Rytas	68	88	85	78	79	–	–
Lietkabelis	77	66	63	77	76	–	–
Third place
Žalgiris	92	90	85	89	–	–	–
Šiauliai–7bet	75	85	70	76	–	–	–

== Final standings ==
Pos	Team	Pld	W	L	Qualification or relegation
1	Rytas (C)	43	36	7	Qualification to Champions League regular season
2	Lietkabelis	42	30	12	Qualification to EuroCup
3	Žalgiris	43	34	9	Already qualified to EuroLeague
4	Šiauliai–7bet	42	19	23	Qualification to Champions League qualifying rounds
5	Cbet Jonava	34	17	17	
6	Uniclub Casino – Juventus	33	15	18	
7	Neptūnas	35	16	19	
8	Dzūkija	34	12	22	
9	Pieno žvaigždės	30	9	21	
10	Nevėžis-OPTIBET	30	7	23	
11	Labas GAS	30	3	27	

Source: LKL.lT
(C) Champions

== Attendance ==
=== Average attendances ===
Pos	Team	Total	High	Low	Average
1	Žalgiris	39,091	5,603	1,000	2,299
2	Rytas	49,141	9,006	806	2,137
3	Šiauliai–7bet	44,412	4,867	720	2,115
4	Lietkabelis	42,048	6,480	510	1,911
5	Neptūnas	17,228	2,578	355	957
6	Uniclub Casino – Juventus	14,131	1,957	378	883
7	Cbet Jonava	14,098	1,700	382	783
8	Nevėžis-OPTIBET	8,810	1,322	305	551
9	Dzūkija	6,310	780	180	371
10	Pieno žvaigždės	5,180	1,000	150	345
11	Labas GAS	4,733	1,100	130	316
	League total	245,182	9,006	130	1,239

Source: LKL.LT

== Awards ==
All official awards of the 2021-22 LKL season.

=== Regular Season MVP ===
Pos.	Player	Team	Source
C	(Croatia) Ivan Buva	Rytas	

=== LKL Finals MVP ===
Pos.	Player	Team	Source
SF\PF	(Lithuania) Arnas Butkevičius	Rytas	

=== All-LKL Team ===
Player	Team	Source
(Lithuania) Lukas Lekavičius	Žalgiris	
(United States) Jon Elmore	Šiauliai-7bet	
(Lithuania) Arnas Butkevičius	Rytas	
(Lithuania) Gediminas Orelik	Lietkabelis	
(Croatia) Ivan Buva	Rytas	

=== Coach of the Year ===
Player	Team	Source
(Lithuania) Giedrius Žibėnas	Rytas	

=== Best Defender ===
Player	Team	Source
(Lithuania) Vytenis Lipkevičius	Lietkabelis	

=== Breakthrough of the Year ===
Player	Team	Source
(Greece) Panagiotis Kalaitzakis	Lietkabelis	

=== Player of the month ===
Month	Player	Team	PIR	Source
2021
September	(United States) Jon Elmore	Šiauliai–7bet	19.7	
October	(United States) Patrick Miller	Uniclub Casino – Juventus	28	
November	(Lithuania) Giedrius Staniulis	Šiauliai-7bet	26	
December	(Serbia) Đorđe Gagić	Lietkabelis	26.3	
2022
January	(Belgium) Manu Lecomte	Cbet Jonava	28	
February	(Belgium) Manu Lecomte	Cbet Jonava	32.5	
March	(Croatia) Ivan Buva	Rytas	21	
April	(Colombia) Juan Palacios	Cbet Jonava	27.6	

== Statistics ==
=== Individual statistics ===
==== Rating ====
Rank	Name	Team	Games	Rating	PIR
1.	(Croatia) Ivan Buva	Rytas	34	626	18.41
2.	(United States) Patrick Miller	Uniclub Casino – Juventus	29	531	18.31
3.	(Senegal) Amar Sylla	Nevėžis–OPTIBET	29	498	17.17

Source: LKL.LT

==== Points ====
Rank	Name	Team	Games	Points	PPG
1.	(United States) Patrick Miller	Uniclub Casino – Juventus	29	520	17.93
2.	(Croatia) Ivan Buva	Rytas	34	560	16.47
3.	(Lithuania) Deividas Gailius	Neptūnas	31	500	16.13

Source: LKL.LT

==== Rebounds ====
Rank	Name	Team	Games	Rebounds	RPG
1.	(Senegal) Amar Sylla	Nevėžis-OPTIBET	29	221	7.62
2.	(Colombia) Juan Palacios	Cbet Jonava	24	182	7.58
3.	(Lithuania) Benas Griciūnas	Neptūnas	34	229	6.74

Source: LKL.LT

==== Assists ====
Rank	Name	Team	Games	Assists	APG
1.	(Lithuania) Žygimantas Janavičius	Neptūnas	32	219	6.84
2.	(United States) Speedy Smith	Rytas	40	229	5.73
3.	(United States) Jon Elmore	Šiauliai–7bet	30	165	5.50

Source: LKL.LT

==== Other statistics ====
Category	Player	Team	Games	Average
Steals	(United States) Randy Culpepper	Pieno žvaigždės	18	2.50
Blocks	(Senegal) Amar Sylla	Nevėžis–OPTIBET	29	2.17
Turnovers	(Lithuania) Ignas Sargiūnas	Labas Gas	30	2.87
Fouls drawn	(United States) Patrick Miller	Uniclub Casino – Juventus	29	5.24
Minutes	(Lithuania) Arnas Beručka	Pieno žvaigždės	31	33:23
FT %	(Lithuania) Mindaugas Girdžiūnas	Rytas	24	90.24%
2-Point %	(Lithuania) Edgaras Želionis	Neptūnas	32	71.32%
3-Point %	(Lithuania) Lukas Lekavičius	Žalgiris	36	47.46%

Source: LKL.LT

=== Individual game highs ===
Category	Player	Team	Opponent	Statistic
Rating	(Croatia) Ivan Buva	Rytas	Cbet Jonava (Jan 13, 2022)	49
Points	(Colombia) Juan Palacios	Cbet Jonava	Labas Gas (Apr 27, 2022)	36
Rebounds	(Colombia) Juan Palacios	Cbet Jonava	Šiauliai–7bet (Mar 6, 2022)	18
Assists	(Lithuania) Vaidas Kariniauskas	Rytas	Nevėžis–OPTIBET (Feb 13, 2022)	15
Steals	(United States) Markell Johnson	Pieno žvaigždės	Nevėžis–OPTIBET (Nov 20, 2021)	6
Steals	(United States) Randy Culpepper	Pieno žvaigždės	Labas Gas (Mar 27, 2022)	6
Steals	(Colombia) Juan Palacios	Cbet Jonava	Šiauliai–7bet (May 6, 2022)	6
Blocks	(Senegal) Amar Sylla	Nevėžis–OPTIBET	Žalgiris (Apr 14, 2022)	6

Source: LKL.LT

=== Team statistics ===
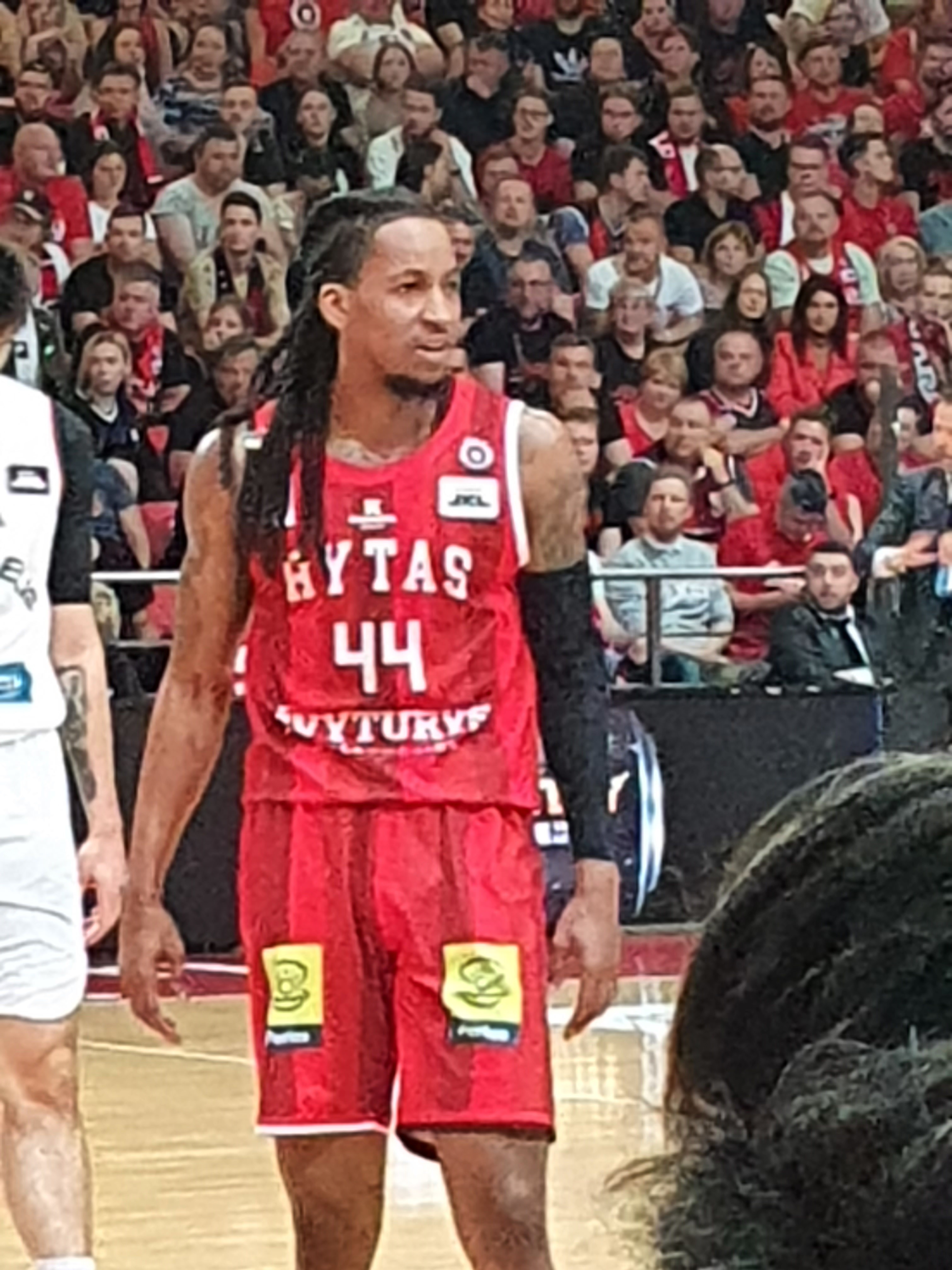
Speedy Smith during Game 5 of the 2022 LKL Finals

Category	Team	Average
Rating	Rytas	102.58
Points	Rytas	87.47
Rebounds	Neptūnas	36.63
Assists	Žalgiris	20.96
Steals	Lietkabelis	8.49
Blocks	Labas Gas	3.55
Turnovers	Neptūnas	15.77
FT %	Žalgiris	79.09%
2-Point %	Neptūnas	57.52%
3-Point %	Žalgiris	39.36%

Source: LKL.LT

== Lithuanian clubs in European competitions ==
Team	Competition	Progress
Žalgiris	EuroLeague	Regular Season
Lietkabelis	EuroCup	Eighthfinals
Rytas	Champions League	Round of 16
Juventus	Champions League	Qualifying rounds
