= Amar Sylla =

Senegalese basketball player

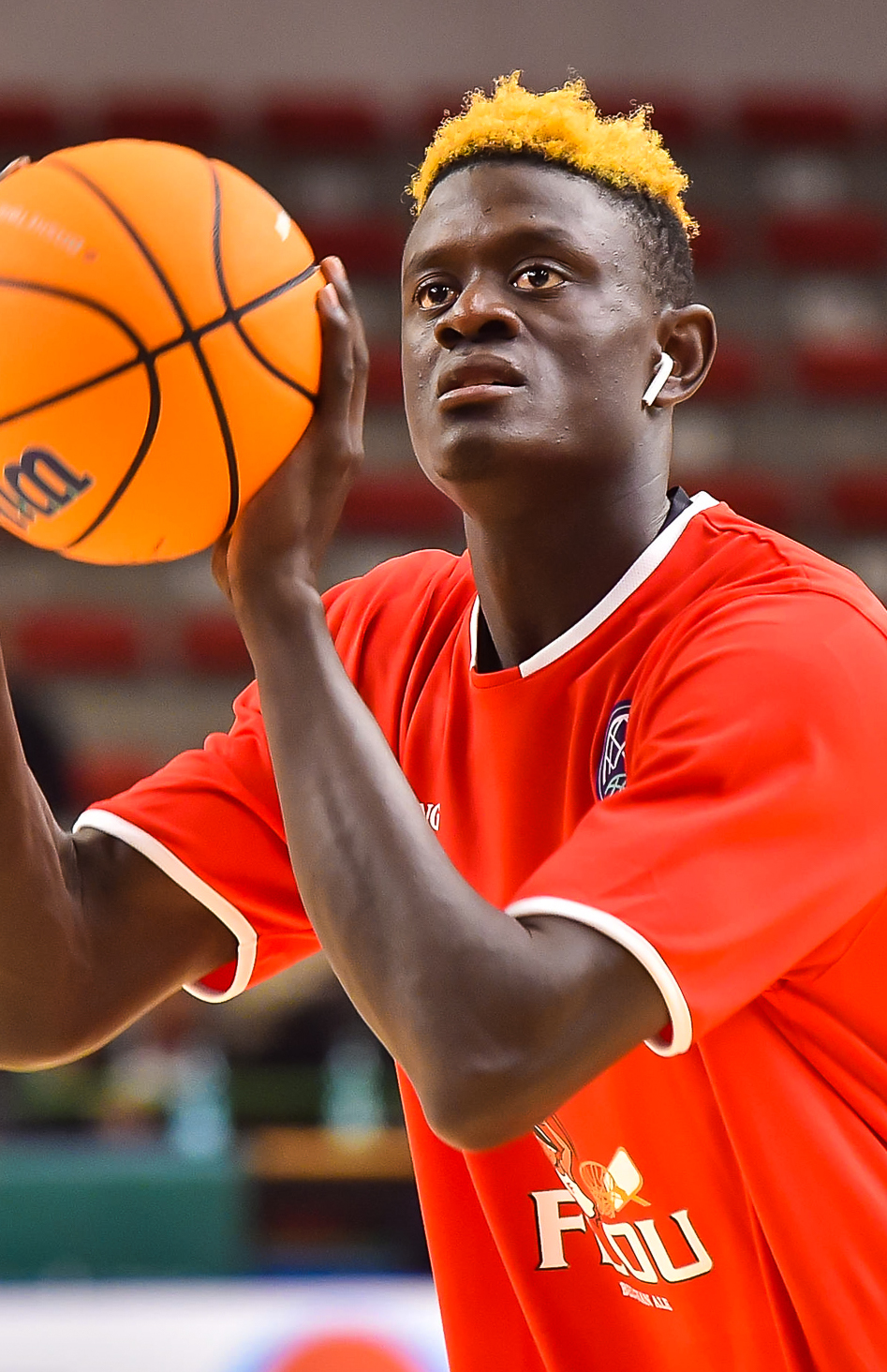
- Sylla in 2019

No. 20 – Bilbao Basket
- Position: Power forward / center
- League: Liga ACB

Personal information
- Born: 1 October 2001 (age 25) Dakar, Senegal
- Listed height: 2.05 m (6 ft 9 in)
- Listed weight: 86 kg (190 lb)

Career information
- NBA draft: 2021: undrafted
- Playing career: 2017–present

Career history
- 2017–2019: Real Madrid B
- 2019–2021: Oostende
- 2021–2022: Nevėžis
- 2022–2023: Real Betis
- 2023–2024: Löwen Braunschweig
- 2024–present: Bilbao Basket

Career highlights
- 2× FIBA Europe Cup champion (2025, 2026); Lithuanian League rebounding leader (2022); 2× PBL champion (2020, 2021); Belgian Cup champion (2021); Next Generation Tournament champion (2019)
Medals
Men's basketball
Representing Senegal
AfroBasket
Bronze medal – third place	2025 Angola
FIBA Africa U18 Championship
Silver medal – second place	2018 Mali	National team

Amar Sylla (born 1 October 2001) is a Senegalese professional basketball player who plays for Bilbao Basket of the Liga ACB. He also plays for the Senegalese national under-18 team.

== Early life and career ==
Sylla was born in Dakar, Senegal. Growing up, he preferred football but began playing basketball at the SEED Academy in Thiès because of his height. In 2015, after taking part in a basketball camp in Kébémer organized by NBA player Gorgui Dieng, Sylla moved to Spain to pursue the sport.

At Munich qualifiers for the 2019 Adidas Next Generation Tournament, Sylla averaged 14.5 points, 7.8 rebounds, and three blocks per game. He led the event in blocked shots and was named to the All-Tournament Team. In four games at the final tournament in Vitoria-Gasteiz, Spain, Sylla averaged 10.3 points, 8.5 rebounds, and 3.3 blocks per game. He helped the Real Madrid junior team win the championship.

== Professional career ==
On 15 July 2019, Sylla signed with Filou Oostende of the Belgian Pro Basketball League (PBL) and European competition Basketball Champions League (BCL). He signed a three-year contract with an NBA opt-out clause. He played for the Orlando Magic in the 2021 NBA Summer League.

In August 2021, Sylla signed with Lithuanian club Nevėžis. He averaged 11.1 points and 7.7 rebounds over 30 games in the season. He played in the 2022 NBA Summer League with the Cleveland Cavaliers.

On 4 August 2022, he signed a one-year contract with Real Betis of the Spanish Liga ACB.

== National team career ==
Sylla played for the Senegalese national under-18 team at the 2018 FIBA Under-18 African Championship in Bamako, Mali, including in the qualifiers. In seven games, he averaged 13.4 points, 9.4 rebounds, and 2.3 assists per game, leading Senegal to second place.

In February 2022, Sylla was selected for the Senegal national team to play in the qualifiers of the 2023 FIBA Basketball World Cup.
