= Ivan Buva =

Croatian basketball player

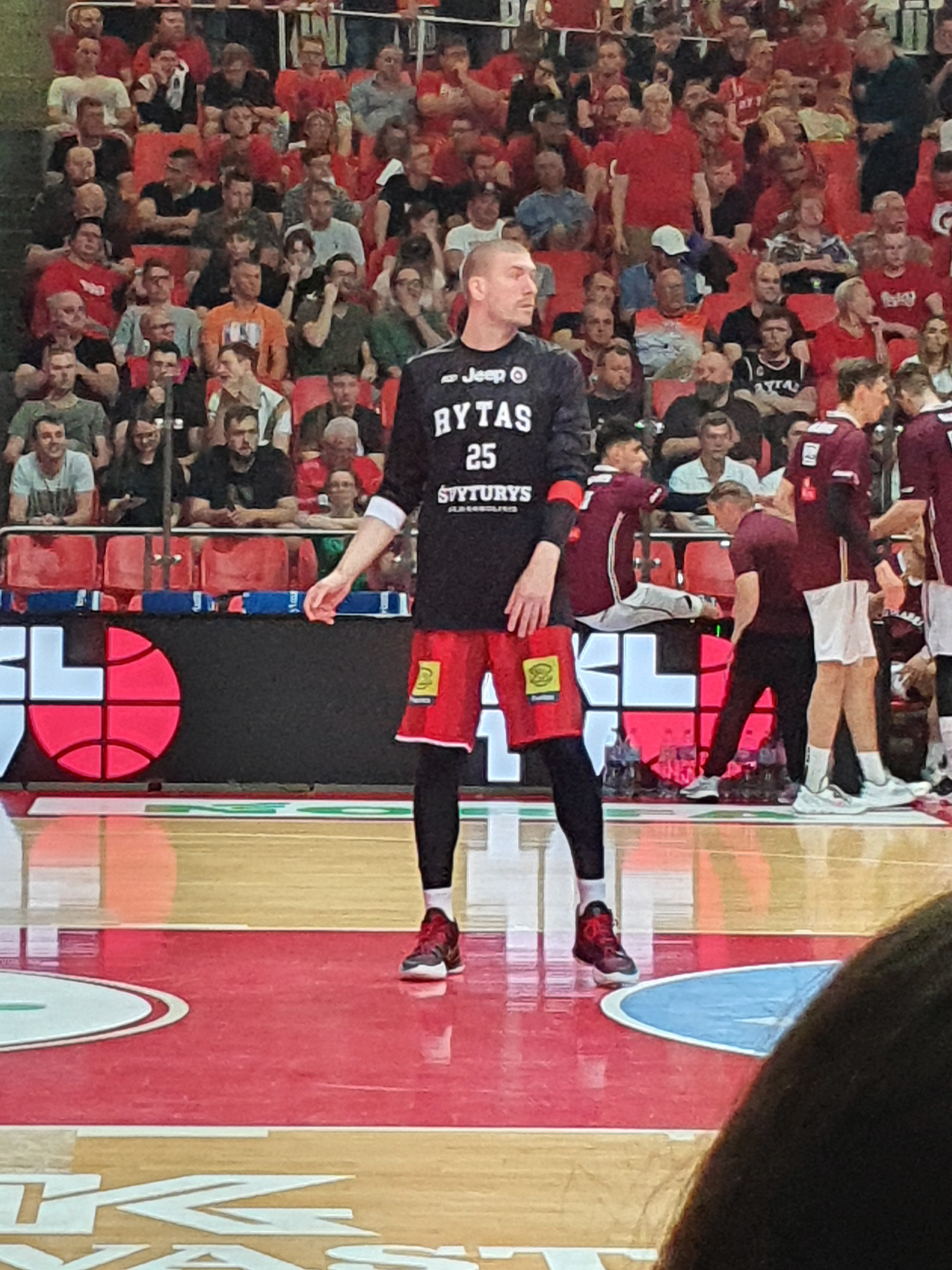
- Buva with Rytas Vilnius during the 2022 LKL Finals

No. 25 – Pistoia Basket 2000
- Position: Center
- League: Serie A2

Personal information
- Born: May 6, 1991 (age 35) Zagreb, SR Croatia, SFR Yugoslavia
- Listed height: 6 ft 10 in (2.08 m)
- Listed weight: 250 lb (113 kg)

Career information
- NBA draft: 2013: undrafted
- Playing career: 2011–present

Career history
- 2011–2012: Križevci
- 2012–2013: Cedevita
- 2013–2014: Široki
- 2014–2015: Cantù
- 2015–2016: Felice Scandone
- 2016–2017: Bilbao
- 2017–2018: İstanbul BB
- 2018: Valencia
- 2018: Anhui Dragons
- 2018–2019: Beşiktaş
- 2019: AS Monaco Basket
- 2019–2020: Gaziantep Basketbol
- 2021: JL Bourg Basket
- 2021–2022: Rytas Vilnius
- 2022–2023: Shiga Lakes
- 2023–2024: Toyama Grouses
- 2024: Scaligera Basket Verona
- 2024–2025: Tabiat Eslamshahr
- 2025: Al Riyadi Beirut
- 2026–present: Pistoia Basket 2000

Career highlights
- Lithuanian League champion (2022); Bosnian Cup winner (2014); Lithuanian League MVP (2022); All-LKL Team (2022); All-Champions League Second Team (2022)

Ivan Buva (born May 6, 1991) is a Croatian professional basketball player for Pistoia Basket 2000 of the Serie A2. Standing at 2.08 m, he plays at the center position.

== Professional career ==
During his career, Buva has played in Croatia, Bosnia and Herzegovina, Italy, Spain, China and Turkey.

On May 3, 2018, Buva signed with Valencia Basket in Spain for the rest of the 2017–18 season.

On July 31, 2018, Buva signed a lucrative contract with Anhui Dragons in China.

In September 2018 Buva signed a one-year deal with the Turkish side Beşiktaş Sompo Japan Istanbul.

On September 30, 2019, he has signed with Monaco of the LNB Pro A.

On October 29, 2019, he has signed with Gaziantep Basketbol of the Turkish Basketball Super League (BSL).

On January 12, 2021, he signed with JL Bourg Basket of the French League. After playing seven matches for Bourg, in February 2021, he signed with Rytas Vilnius of the Lithuanian League. He helped Rytas win the Lithuanian championship in 2022 - the first since 2010.

On 17 September 2024, Buva joined the Tabiat Eslamshahr of the Iranian Basketball Super League.

On July 23 2025, Buva joined Al Riyadi Club Beirut of the Lebanese Basketball League.
