= Irfan Smajlagić =

Croatian handball player (born 1961)

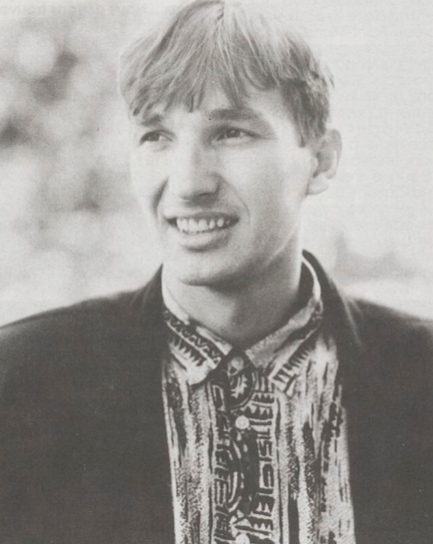

Personal information
- Full name: Irfan Smajlagić
- Born: 16 October 1961 (age 65) Banja Luka, PR Bosnia-Herzegovina, FPR Yugoslavia
- Height: 1.88 m (6 ft 2 in)

Sport
- Sport: Handball
- Position: Right wing

Youth career
- Years: Team
- 1975–1978: Borac Banja Luka

Senior clubs
- Years: Team
- 1978–1987: Borac Banja Luka
- 1987–1990: Medveščak Zagreb
- 1990–1993: US Ivry
- 1993–1994: USAM Nîmes
- 1994–1996: Badel 1862 Zagreb
- 1996–1997: RK Zamet
- 1997–1999: Medveščak Zagreb
- 1999–2000: Livry-Gargan
- 2000–2001: Girondins de Bordeaux
- 2001–2002: Livry-Gargan
National team
Years	Team		
1987–1991	Yugoslavia		
1992–2000	Croatia	93	(290)

Teams managed
- 2002–2003: RK Čakovec
- 2003–2006: Croatia (assistant)
- 2005–2007: Croatia U-21
- 2007–2009: Egypt
- 2009–2011: Bosna Sarajevo
- 2012–2013: RK Zamet
- 2013–2014: Lokomotiva Zagreb
- 2015–2016: Iran
- 2022–2024: Bosnia and Herzegovina
- 2023–: Borac Banja Luka
Medal record
Men's handball
Representing Yugoslavia
Olympic Games
Bronze medal – third place	1988 Seoul	Team
Representing Croatia
Olympic Games
Gold medal – first place	1996 Atlanta	Team
World Championship
Silver medal – second place	1995 Iceland	Team
European Championship
Bronze medal – third place	1994 Portugal	Team
Mediterranean Games
Gold medal – first place	1993 Languedoc-Roussillon	Team

Irfan "Pipe" Smajlagić (born 16 October 1961) is a Bosnian-born Croatian former handball player and the current coach of Borac Banja Luka. He competed in the 1988 Summer Olympics for Yugoslavia and in the 1996 Summer Olympics for Croatia.

In 1988, he was part of the Yugoslav national team, which won the bronze medal at the 1988 Olympics. He played five matches and scored 14 goals.

Eight years later, he won the gold medal with the Croatian national team at the 1996 Olympics. He played six matches and scored 31 goals.

He was inducted in the European Handball Hall of Fame in 2023.

== Personal life ==
His son Sven is a professional basketball player.

== Honours ==
=== Player ===
Borac Banja Luka

- Yugoslav First League: 1980–81
- Yugoslav Cup: 1979

Medveščak Zagreb

- Yugoslav Cup: 1988–89, 1989–90

USAM Nîmes

- Coupe de France: 1994

Badel 1862 Zagreb

- Croatian First League: 1994–95, 1995–96
- Croatian Cup: 1995, 1996
- EHF Champions League runner-up: 1994–95

Yugoslavia

- 1988 Summer Olympics – 3rd place

Croatia

- 1993 Mediterranean Games – 1st place
- 1994 European Championship – 3rd place
- 1995 World Championship – 2nd place
- 1996 Summer Olympics – 1st place

Individual

- Best right wing at the 1995 World Championship
- 1995 World Championship Dream Team
- Best Croatian handballer of 1995 by the HRS
- Best Croatian handballer of 1995 by Sportske novosti
- Best right wing at the 1996 Summer Olympics
- 1996 Summer Olympics Dream Team
- Franjo Bučar State Award for Sport: 1996
- LNH Division 1 top goalscorer: 1999–00 – 174 goals
- LNH Division 1 top goalscorer: 2001–02 – 185 goals

=== Coach ===
Croatia (assistant)

- 2003 World Championship – 1st place
- 2004 Summer Olympics – 1st place
- Franjo Bučar State Award for Sport: 2004
- 2005 World Championship – 2nd place

Egypt

- 2008 African Championship – 1st place

Bosna Sarajevo

- Bosnian First League: 2009–10, 2010–11
- Bosnian Cup: 2009–10

Lokomotiva Zagreb

- Croatian First League: 2013–14
- Croatian Cup: 2013–14

== Orders ==
- Order of Danica Hrvatska with face of Franjo Bučar – 1995, 2004
