= Isaiah Armwood =

American basketball player (born 1990)

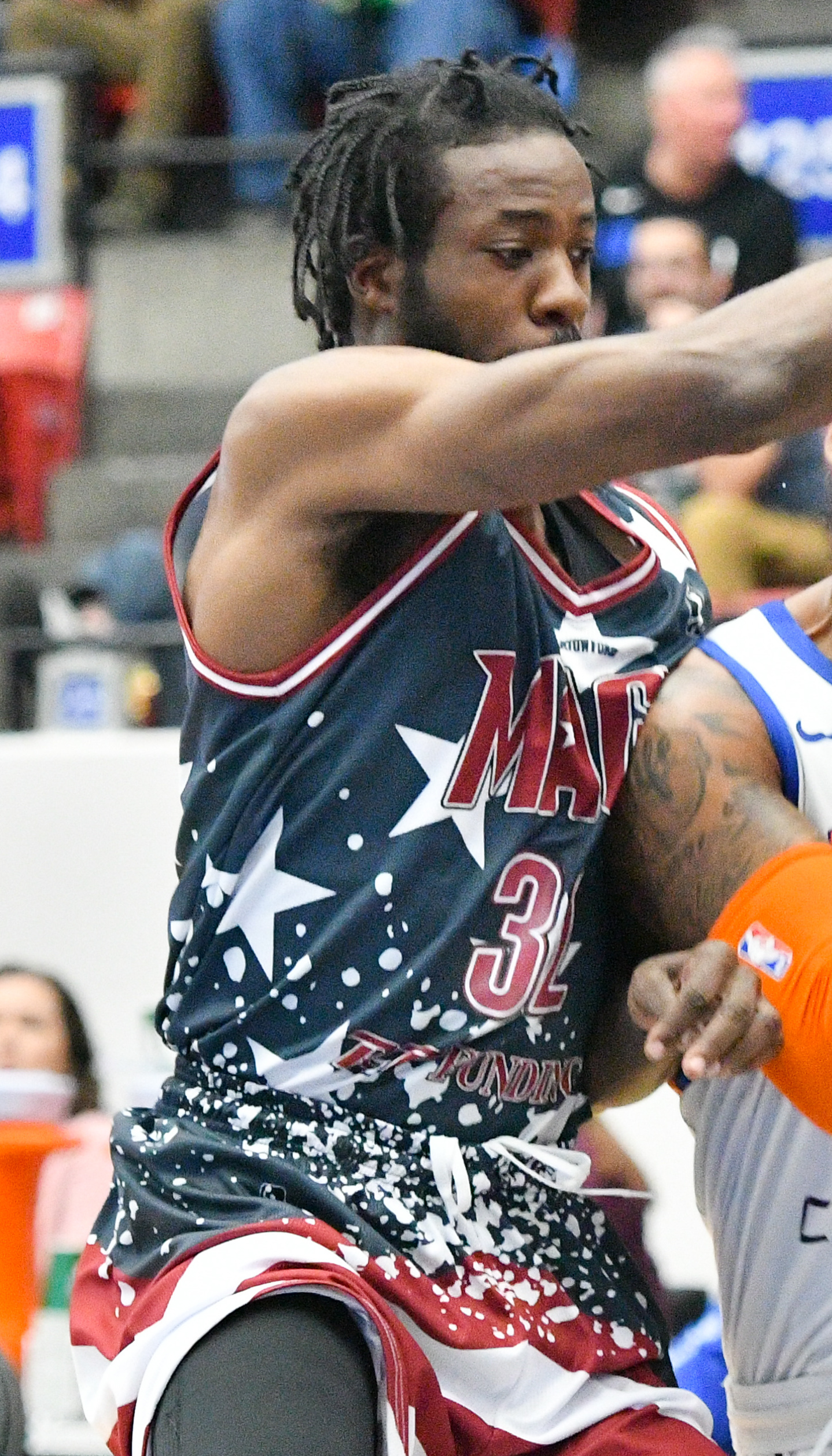
- Armwood playing for the Lakeland Magic

Free agent
- Position: Power forward / center

Personal information
- Born: December 28, 1990 (age 35) Baltimore, Maryland, U.S.
- Listed height: 6 ft 9 in (2.06 m)
- Listed weight: 215 lb (98 kg)

Career information
- High school: Montrose Christian School (Rockville, Maryland)
- College: Villanova (2009–2011); George Washington (2012–2014)
- NBA draft: 2014: undrafted
- Playing career: 2014–present

Career history
- 2014–2016: Dolomiti Energia Trento
- 2016–2017: Rizing Zephyr Fukuoka
- 2017–2018: DEAC
- 2018–2019: Capital City Go-Go
- 2019: DEAC
- 2020: Lakeland Magic
- 2020–2021: CS Dinamo București
- 2021–2022: BC Šiauliai
- 2022–2023: Sporting CP
- 2023–2024: Kobe Storks
- 2024–2025: Sporting CP

Career highlights
- Second-team All-Atlantic 10 (2014); Atlantic 10 All-Defensive Team (2014)

Gerald Isaiah Armwood (born December 28, 1990) is an American basketball player for the Sporting CP of the Liga Portuguesa de Basquetebol. A 6'9 power forward, Armwood played college basketball at Villanova and George Washington.

== College career ==
Coming out of Montrose Christian School, Armwood was the 41st ranked recruit according to ESPN. Armwood began his collegiate career at Villanova, where he averaged 2.3 points and 2.1 rebounds per game as a freshman. He improved those numbers to 2.5 points and 3.6 rebounds per game as a sophomore. Due to not receiving much playing time, he decided to transfer to George Washington University and had to sit out the 2011–12 season as a redshirt. George Washington coach Mike Lonergan called Armwood "the first impact recruit we really had." Armwood chose George Washington after mulling his options at Maryland, Iowa, and Texas Tech.

"It was harder than I expected," Armwood said of his redshirt year. "I thought it was going to be kind of easy – just work out every day on my game, but it was a lot harder. I wasn't used to sitting out." In his junior season, Armwood led the Colonials in scoring (11.9 points per game), rebounding (8.8 per game) and blocked shots (2.3 per game). He nearly posted a triple double with 12 points, 10 rebounds and seven blocks in a game against Kansas State. As a senior, Armwood teamed with fellow transfer Maurice Creek in leading George Washington to a 24–9 record and NCAA Tournament berth. In the Round of 64 against Memphis, Armwood tallied 21 points and 5 rebounds in a 71–66 loss to the Tigers. He averaged 12.7 points, 8.4 rebounds, and 1.5 blocks per game and was named Second Team All-Atlantic 10.

== Professional career ==
In August 2014, he signed with Dolomiti Energia Trento in Italy's Lega Basket Serie A.

On August 11, 2017, Armwood was announced by Hungarian side DEAC, that just promoted to the top division Nemzeti Bajnokság I/A.

For the 2017–18 season, Armwood was named to the training camp roster of the Capital City Go-Go of the NBA G League.

On January 7, 2020, Armwood was acquired by the Lakeland Magic in the NBA G League after being acquired from the Go-Go in late December. On January 16, he had 14 points, eight rebounds, three steals and two assists off the bench in a win over the Windy City Bulls. Armwood averaged 6.4 points, 6.2 rebounds, 2.0 assists, 1.2 blocks and 1.1 steals per game. He signed with CS Dinamo București of the Liga Națională on November 18. Armwood averaged 14.6 points and 7.2 rebounds per game. On July 31, 2021, he signed with BC Šiauliai of the Lithuanian Basketball League.

== The Basketball Tournament (TBT) ==
In the summer of 2017, Armwood competed in The Basketball Tournament on ESPN for Supernova; a team composed of Villanova University basketball alum. In two games, he averaged 4.5 points and 6.0 rebounds per game to help number two seeded Supernova advance to the second-round where they were defeated 82–74 by Team Fancy.
