= Sven Smajlagić =

Croatian basketball player

Cibona
- Position: Shooting guard
- League: Croatian League; ABA League

Personal information
- Born: 5 June 1990 (age 36) Zagreb, SR Croatia, SFR Yugoslavia
- Listed height: 6 ft 5 in (1.96 m)
- Listed weight: 200 lb (91 kg)

Career information
- NBA draft: 2012: undrafted
- Playing career: 2009–present

Career history
- 2009–2010: Novi Grad
- 2010–2011: Cibona
- 2011: → Zabok
- 2011–2012: Bosna
- 2012–2013: Banská Bystrica
- 2013–2014: Nitra
- 2014–2015: Iskra Svit
- 2016: Šenčur
- 2016: Zagreb
- 2016: Zabok
- 2017: Psychiko
- 2017: Zabok
- 2017: ALM Évreux Basket
- 2018–2019: Zrinjski Mostar
- 2019–2020: Zabok
- 2020–2021: Cedevita Junior
- 2021–2022: Nevėžis
- 2022–2023: Cibona
- 2023–2024: Basket Mestre
- 2024– present: Cibona

Career highlights
- Bosnian League champion (2018); Croatian Cup winner (2023)
Medals
Men's basketball
Representing Croatia
European U-18 Championship
Bronze medal – third place	2008 Greece	U-18 Team

Sven Smajlagić (born 5 June 1990) is a Croatian professional basketball player for Cibona Zagreb in the Croatian League and the ABA League. He has played also professionally in Lithuania, France, Greece, Bosnia and Herzegovina, Slovakia and Slovenia. In 2010–11 he played in the Euroleague with Cibona.

== National team ==
Smajlagić has played for the Croatia's Under-16 and Under-18 national team.

== Personal life ==
Smajlagić is the son of former handball player Irfan Smajlagić who won the gold medal at the 1996 Summer Olympics with Croatia.

== External sites ==
- Sven Smajlagić at FIBA.basketball
- Sven Smajlagić at FIBA.com (archived)
- Sven Smajlagić at EuroLeague
- Sven Smajlagić at Eurobasket.com
- Sven Smajlagić at RealGM
- Sven Smajlagić at Proballers
- Sven Smajlagić – Basketball-Reference.com international player profile
