= 2017 King Mindaugas Cup =

Basketball competition in Lithuania

2017 Karaliaus Mindaugo taurė
- The Žalgiris Arena hosted the tournament.

Tournament details
- Arena: Žalgiris Arena; Kaunas, Lithuania
- Dates: 14–19 February 2017

Final positions
- Champions: Žalgiris (1st title)
- Runners-up: Lietkabelis
- Third place: Juventus
- Fourth place: Vytautas

Awards and statistics
- MVP: (Lithuania) Edgaras Ulanovas

The 2017 Karaliaus Mindaugo taurė, also known as KIDY Tour – Karaliaus Mindaugo taurė for sponsorship purposes, was the second edition of the Lithuanian King Mindaugas Cup. On 18 February 2016 it was announced that Kaunas would host the tournament.

Lietuvos rytas were the defending champion, but were eliminated in the quarter-finals by Juventus.

Žalgiris won their first title, beating Lietkabelis 84–63 in the final. Juventus won bronze medals, defeating Vytautas. Žalgiris forward Edgaras Ulanovas was awarded as MVP of the tournament.

== Format changes ==
Tournament format was slightly changed before 2017. Quarterfinals were separated from final matches and played in home team arenas. Due to these changes tournament length was extended from 3 to 6 days.

== Qualified teams ==
Eight highest ranked teams after the first half of the 2016–17 LKL regular season qualified to the tournament.

Pos	Team	Pld	W	L	PF	PA	PD	Qualification
1	Žalgiris	18	17	1	1537	1228	+309	Seeded teams
2	Lietkabelis	18	14	4	1493	1363	+130	Seeded teams
3	Lietuvos rytas	18	13	5	1464	1283	+181	Seeded teams
4	Vytautas	18	10	8	1382	1283	+99	Seeded teams
5	Neptūnas	18	8	10	1375	1333	+42	Non-seeded teams
6	Pieno žvaigždės	18	8	10	1381	1402	−21	Non-seeded teams
7	Juventus	18	8	10	1437	1475	−38	Non-seeded teams
8	Dzūkija	18	5	13	1199	1380	−181	Non-seeded teams

Source: LKL

== Draw ==
The draw of the 2017 Karaliaus Mindaugo taurė was held on 9 January 2017 at 14:00 EET in Town Hall of Kaunas. The seeded teams were paired with the non-seeded teams for the quarterfinals. The location of these matches was determined by the luck of the draw.

== Bracket ==
Quarterfinals; 14–15 February
Žalgiris	81
Neptūnas	58
Pieno žvaigždės	75
Vytautas	90
Dzūkija	80
Lietkabelis	86
Juventus	87
Lietuvos rytas	84

Semi-finals; 18 February
Žalgiris	76
Vytautas	55
Lietkabelis	75
Juventus	70

Final; 19 February
Žalgiris	84
Lietkabelis	63

== Three-Point Contest ==
Contestants
Pos.	Player	Team	Height	Weight	First round	Second round	Final round
G/F	Arvydas Čepulis	Šiauliai	1.96	87	20	18	22
F	Saulius Kulvietis	Vytautas	2.06	100	21	16 (7)	17
F	Ignas Vaitkus	Nevėžis	1.97	93	17 (7)	16 (2)	—
G	Paulius Valinskas	Žalgiris	1.91	85	19	14	—
G	Tadas Rinkūnas^{REP}	Lietkabelis	1.95	80	17 (6)	—	—
G/F	Deividas Gailius^{REP}	Lietuvos rytas	2.00	92	16	—	—
G	Gediminas Navickas	Dzūkija	1.80	71	15	—	—
G	Derrick Low	Pieno žvaigždės	1.88	85	12	—	—
G/F	Gytis Sirutavičius	Juventus	1.95	87	11	—	—
G	Laurynas Beliauskas	Neptūnas	1.91	78	11	—	—
F/C	Kšyštof Lavrinovič	Lietkabelis	2.09	105	11	—	—

^REP Deividas Gailius was selected as Margiris Normantas replacement.
^REP Tadas Rinkūnas was selected as Ben Magden replacement.

== Slam Dunk Contest ==
Contestants
Pos.	Player	Team	Height	Weight	First round	Final round
–	Gediminas Žitlinskas	Street artist	1.75	74	93 (50+43)	149 (49+50+50)
G/F	Aaron Best	Juventus	1.93	84	91 (50+41)	148 (50+50+48)
F/C	Martynas Echodas	Šiauliai	2.06	102	83 (39+44)	—
F	Rytis Pipiras^{REP}	Šiauliai	2.03	93	80 (35+45)	—
F	Donatas Tarolis	Lietkabelis	2.02	91	55 (20+35)	—
F	Isaiah Hartenstein^{INJ}	Žalgiris	2.10	113	—	—

^REP Rytis Pipiras was selected as Drew Gordon replacement.
^INJ Isaiah Hartenstein was unable to participate due to an injury
