= Arijus Pašakarnys =

Lithuanian basketball player (born 1997)

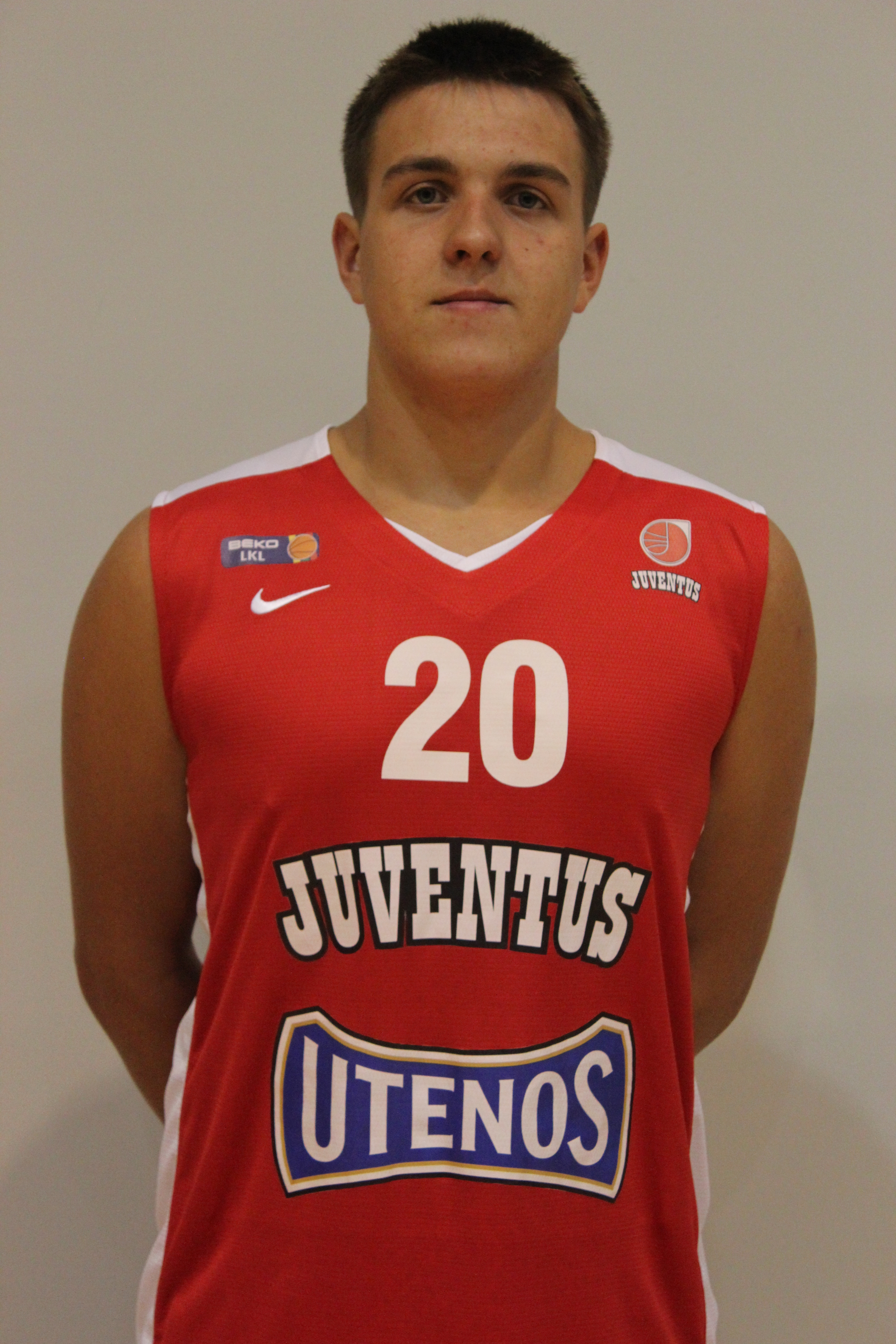
- Pašakarnys with Juventus Utena in 2014

No. 20 – Juventus Utena
- Position: Small forward
- League: Lithuanian Basketball League

Personal information
- Born: October 1, 1997 (age 29) Utena, Lithuania
- Listed height: 195 cm (6.40 ft)
- Listed weight: 90 kg (200 lb)

Career information
- Playing career: 2013–present

Career history
- 2013–present: Juventus Utena (LKL)

Arijus Pašakarnys (born October 1, 1997) is a professional Lithuanian basketball player. He plays for small forward position.
