= Paulius Valinskas =

Lithuanian basketball player (born 1995)

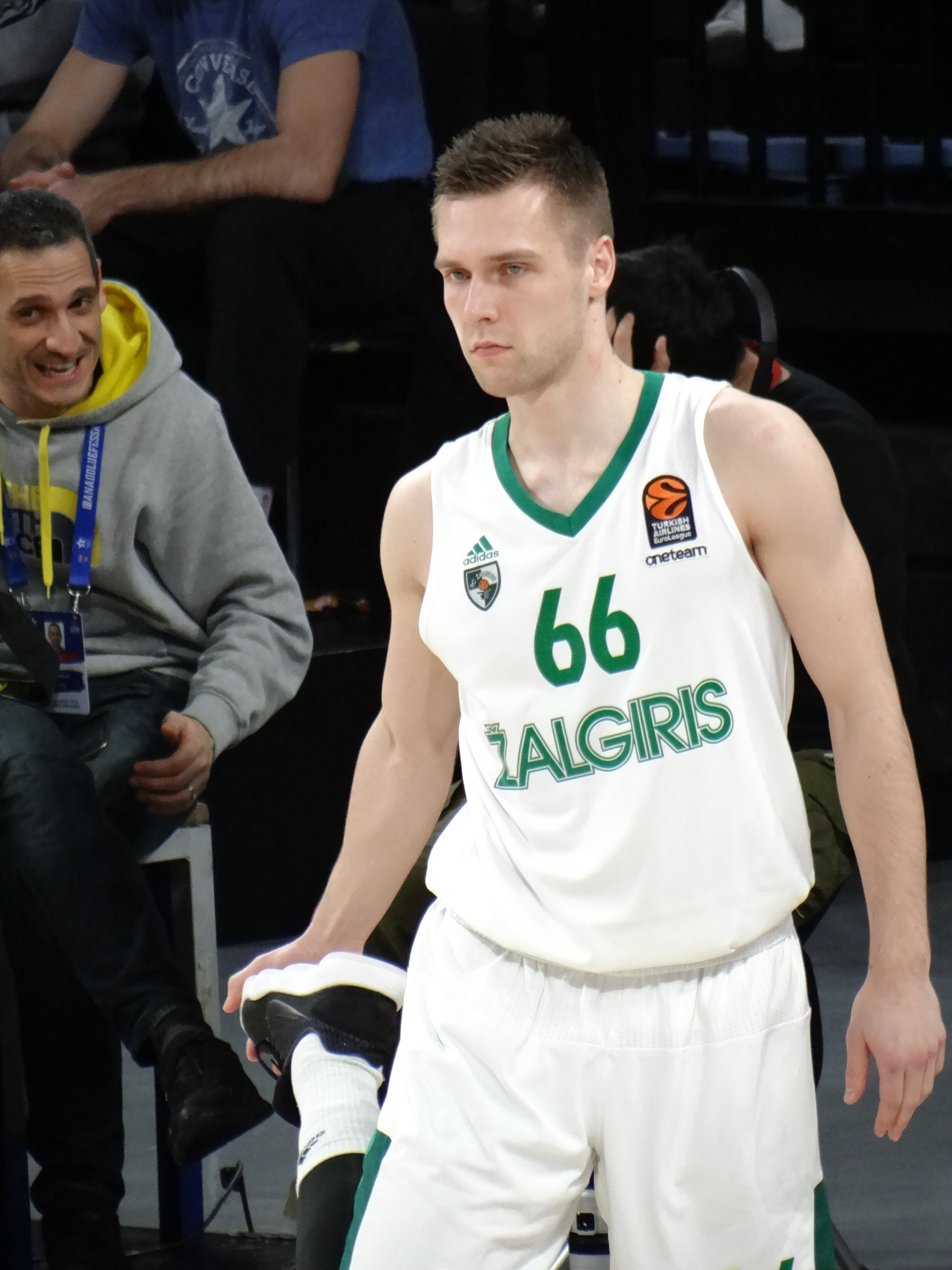
- Valinskas with Žalgiris Kaunas in 2018

No. 66 – Juventus Utena
- Position: Point guard / shooting guard
- League: LKL; BCL

Personal information
- Born: 9 December 1995 (age 30) Kaunas, Lithuania
- Listed height: 1.91 m (6 ft 3 in)
- Listed weight: 85 kg (187 lb)

Career information
- NBA draft: 2017: undrafted
- Playing career: 2013–present

Career history
- 2013–2019: Žalgiris Kaunas
- 2013–2016: →Žalgiris-2
- 2018–2019: →Lietkabelis Panevėžys
- 2019: →Orléans Loiret
- 2019–2021: Lietkabelis Panevėžys
- 2021–2022: Okapi Aalst
- 2022–2023: FMP
- 2023–2024: Lietkabelis Panevėžys
- 2024–2025: Borac Čačak
- 2025–present: Juventus Utena

Career highlights
- 2× LKL champion (2017, 2018); 2× King Mindaugas Cup winner (2017, 2018); NKL most improved player (2016)

Paulius Valinskas (born 9 December 1995) is a Lithuanian professional basketball player for Juventus Utena of the Lithuanian Basketball League (LKL) and the Basketball Champions League (BCL). He is a 1.91 m (6 ft 3 in) tall combo guard.

== Early career ==
During the 2015–16 season with BC Žalgiris-2, Valinskas won the National Basketball League silver medals after losing to BC Sūduva in the final. He averaged 14.5 points and 3.2 assists in 29 minutes of action and got the 2015–16 Most Improved Player Award.

== Professional career ==
After a breakout season with Žalgiris-2, Valinskas was invited into the main Žalgiris team in the summer of 2016. During his first two years, he saw little playing time. In the 2017–18 season, he averaged 4.7 points in the LKL and 2.8 points in the Euroleague. On 3 November 2017, during an away game against CSKA Moscow, Valinskas scored a career high 11 points, making 3 of his 4 three-pointers.

On 6 August 2018, Valinskas was loaned to Lietkabelis Panevėžys. In 55 games played during the season (both in the LKL and the Champions League), Valinskas averaged 11.9 points, 3.3 assists and 2.6 rebounds, shooting 46% from the field overall.

On 2 August 2019, he went on loan to French club Orléans Loiret Basket of the LNB Pro A.

On 12 August 2021, Valinskas signed with Okapi Aalst of the Belgian BNXT League.

On 4 August 2022, Valinskas signed a two-year contract for FMP of the Basketball League of Serbia and the ABA League. On 13 April 2023, he mutually parted ways with the Serbian club. In 21 games played, he averaged 14.4 points, 1.8 rebounds and 4.7 assists per game.

On 9 September 2023, Valinskas returned to Lietkabelis Panevėžys for a third stint, signing a one-year contract. He parted ways with the club on 30 April 2024.

On 12 July 2024, Valinskas was announced as the new player of KK Borac Mozzart.

On 8 September 2025, Valinskas signed with Juventus Utena of the Lithuanian Basketball League (LKL).

== Career statistics ==
Legend
GP	Games played	GS	Games started	MPG	Minutes per game
FG%	Field-goal percentage	3P%	3-point field-goal percentage	FT%	Free-throw percentage
RPG	Rebounds per game	APG	Assists per game	SPG	Steals per game
BPG	Blocks per game	PPG	Points per game	PIR	Performance index rating
**Bold**	Career high

=== EuroLeague ===
Year	Team	GP	GS	MPG	FG%	3P%	FT%	RPG	APG	SPG	BPG	PPG	PIR
2016–17	Žalgiris	5	0	1.7	**.667**	.000	.100	.0	.4	.0	.0	1.2	1.2
2017–18	Žalgiris	**25**	**1**	**8.9**	.371	**.310**	**.750**	**1.1**	**.7**	**.2**	.0	**2.6**	**2.5**
Career		30	1	7.45	.519	.310	.673	1.9	2.3	.4	.0	2.5	2.3

=== EuroCup ===
Year	Team	GP	GS	MPG	FG%	3P%	FT%	RPG	APG	SPG	BPG	PPG	PIR
2020–21	Lietkabelis	**9**	**7**	**26.1**	.425	.455	.667	**2.2**	1.2	**.4**	.0	11.0	5.8
2023–24	Lietkabelis	7	5	26.1	**.509**	**.483**	**.774**	1.6	**3.8**	.3	.0	**13.1**	**10.6**
Career		16	12	26.9	.466	.468	.727	1.9	2.5	.4	.0	11.9	8.7
