= Gintautas Matulis =

Lithuanian basketball player (born 1986)

No. 6 – Juventus Utena
- Position: Small forward
- League: LKL; BCL

Personal information
- Born: 6 December 1986 (age 39) Rokiškis, Lithuanian SSR, Soviet Union
- Listed height: 1.97 m (6 ft 6 in)
- Listed weight: 94 kg (207 lb)

Career information
- NBA draft: 2008: undrafted
- Playing career: 2008–2023, 2024–present

Career history
- 2008–2014: Juventus Utena
- 2014–2015: Ežerūnas-Karys Molėtai
- 2015–2017: Sūduva-Mantinga Marijampolė
- 2017–2018: Nevėžis Kėdainiai
- 2018: Þór Þorlákshöfn
- 2018–2019: Nevėžis Kėdainiai
- 2019–2020: Sūduva-Mantinga Marijampolė
- 2020–2023: Juventus Utena
- 2024–2026: Jurbarkas-Karys
- 2026–present: Juventus Utena

Career highlights
- BBL Challenge Cup champion (2011); 2× NKL champion (2016, 2017)
Medals
Men's 3x3 basketball
Representing Lithuania
Olympic Games
Bronze medal – third place	2024 Paris	Team
FIBA 3x3 World Cup
Silver medal – second place	2022 Antwerp	Team

Gintautas Matulis (born 6 December 1986) is a Lithuanian professional basketball player for Juventus Utena of the Lithuanian Basketball League (LKL) and the Basketball Champions League (BCL). He plays at the small forward position.

== Professional career ==
Matulis spent the 2017–18 season with Nevėžis Kėdainiai in the Lithuanian Basketball League and FIBA Europe Cup. On 5 July 2018, he signed with Þór Þorlákshöfn of the Icelandic Úrvalsdeild karla. He left the team in November due to injuries after averaging 9.8 points and 5.0 rebounds in 4 games.

On 13 June 2020, Matulis returned to Juventus Utena.

On 17 July 2026, Matulis once again returned to Juventus Utena of the Lithuanian Basketball League (LKL) and the Basketball Champions League (BCL).

== Post-playing career ==
On 13 April 2023, Matulis became the general manager of Juventus Utena.

== National 3x3 team ==
As a member of the Lithuania men's national 3x3 team, Matulis won a bronze medal at the 2024 Summer Olympics and a silver medal at the 2022 FIBA 3x3 World Cup.
