= Džiugas Slavinskas =

Lithuanian basketball player

No. 7 – Juventus Utena
- Position: Power forward / Small forward
- League: LKL; BCL

Personal information
- Born: 11 November 1998 (age 28) Pasvalys, Lithuania
- Listed height: 2.02 m (6 ft 8 in)
- Listed weight: 97 kg (214 lb)

Career information
- NBA draft: 2020: undrafted
- Playing career: 2014–present

Career history
- 2014–2017: Neptūnas-Akvaservis
- 2017: Gran Canaria B
- 2018: Neptūnas-Akvaservis
- 2018–2021: Neptūnas Klaipėda
- 2021–2022: Inter Bratislava
- 2022–2023: Geosan Kolín
- 2023–2024: Lietkabelis Panevėžys
- 2024–2025: Mladost Zemun
- 2025: Lietkabelis Panevėžys
- 2025: BC Gargždai
- 2025–2026: Jonava Hipocredit
- 2026–present: Juventus Utena
Medals
Men's basketball
Representing Lithuania
FIBA Europe Under-18 Championship
Silver medal – second place	2016 Turkey	U-18 National Team

Džiugas Slavinskas (born 11 November 1998) is a Lithuanian professional basketball player for Juventus Utena of the Lithuanian Basketball League (LKL) and the Basketball Champions League (BCL). He can play both small forward and power forward positions.

== Professional career ==
Slavinskas started his professional career when he signed with Neptūnas-Akvaservis in summer 2014.

For the 2022–23 season, Slavinskas signed with Geosan Kolín of the Czech National Basketball League (NBL) on 10 August 2022.

On 21 July 2023, Slavinskas signed a one-year deal with Lietkabelis Panevėžys of the Lithuanian Basketball League (LKL) and the EuroCup.

On 9 September 2025, Slavinskas signed with BC Gargždai of the Lithuanian Basketball League (LKL). However, on 9 October 2025, Slavinskas left BC Gargždai club and signed a new contract until the end of the 2025–26 season with Jonava Hipocredit of the Lithuanian Basketball League (LKL).

On 28 October 2026, Slavinskas signed contract until 1 January 2027 with Juventus Utena of the Lithuanian Basketball League (LKL) and the Basketball Champions League (BCL).
