= Cameron Reynolds =

American basketball player (born 1995)

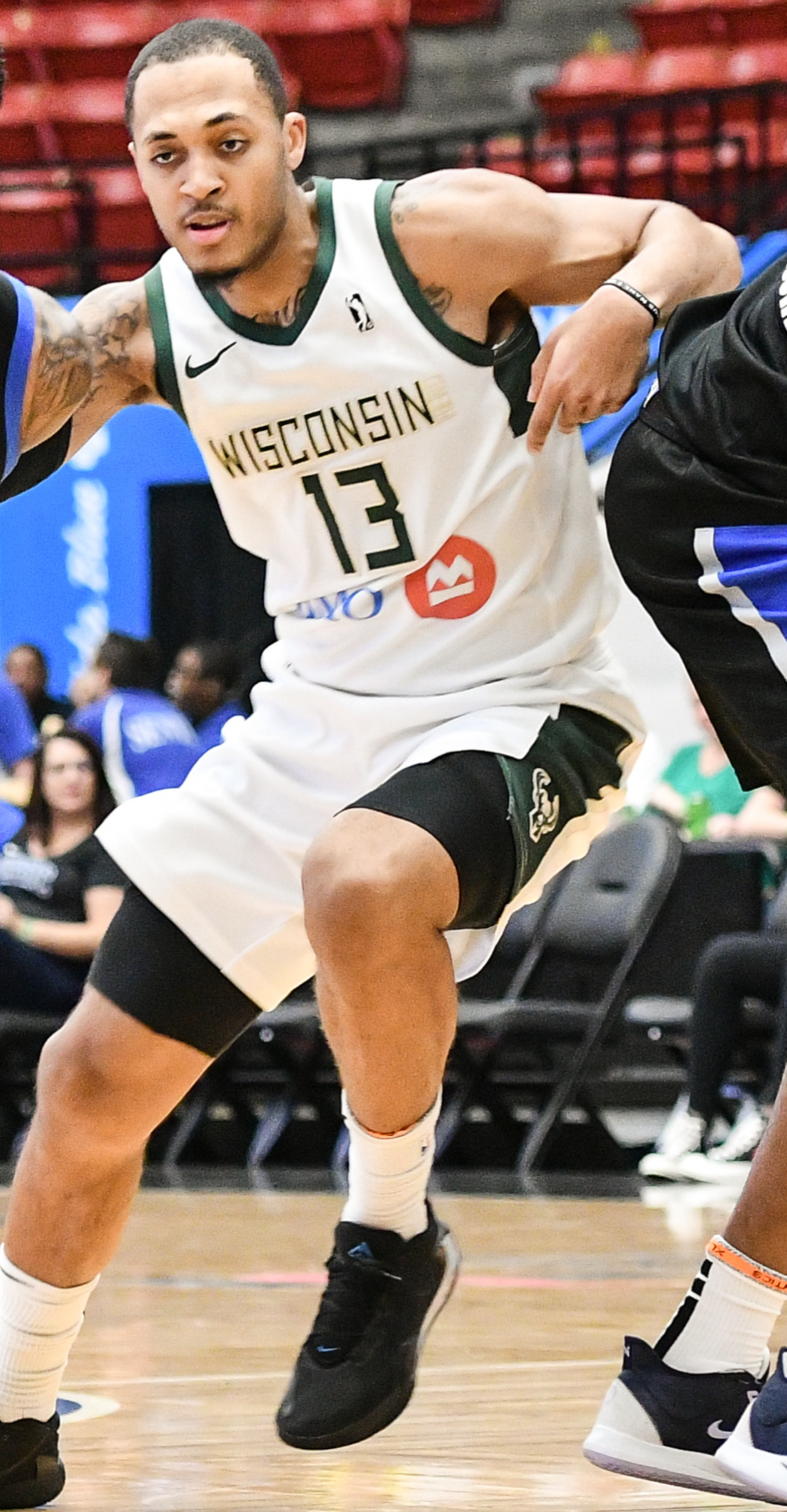
- Reynolds with the Wisconsin Herd in 2019

No. 23 – Juventus Utena
- Position: Small forward / power forward
- League: LKL; BCL

Personal information
- Born: February 7, 1995 (age 31) Pearland, Texas, U.S.
- Listed height: 6 ft 7 in (2.01 m)
- Listed weight: 225 lb (102 kg)

Career information
- High school: Pearland (Pearland, Texas)
- College: Tulane (2013–2018)
- NBA draft: 2018: undrafted
- Playing career: 2018–present

Career history
- 2018–2019: Stockton Kings
- 2019: Minnesota Timberwolves
- 2019–2020: Wisconsin Herd
- 2020–2021: Austin Spurs
- 2021: San Antonio Spurs
- 2021: Houston Rockets
- 2021–2022: Aquila Basket Trento
- 2022–2023: Budućnost
- 2023–2024: Promitheas Patras
- 2024–2026: Maroussi
- 2026–present: Juventus Utena

Career highlights
- Montenegrin League champion (2023); Montenegrin Cup winner (2023); AAC Most Improved Player (2017)
- Stats at NBA.com
- Stats at Basketball Reference
Medals
Men's basketball
Representing the United States
FIBA AmeriCup
Bronze medal – third place	2025 Managua

Cameron Reynolds (born February 7, 1995) is an American professional basketball player for Juventus Utena of the Lithuanian Basketball League (LKL) and the Basketball Champions League (BCL). He played college basketball for the Tulane Green Wave.

== College career ==
Reynolds was named American Athletic Conference Most Improved Player as a junior. He averaged 17 points and 6.8 rebounds per game. As a senior at Tulane, Reynolds averaged 15.1 points and 6.3 rebounds per game.

== Professional career ==
=== Stockton Kings (2018–2019) ===
After going undrafted in the 2018 NBA draft, Reynolds signed with the Stockton Kings of the NBA G League. He averaged 16.0 points per game in 33 appearances.

=== Minnesota Timberwolves (2019) ===
Reynolds was signed to a 10-day contract by the Minnesota Timberwolves on February 27, 2019. He made his NBA debut on March 3, 2019, scoring two points in two minutes of play in a 121–135 loss to the Washington Wizards. On March 15, 2019, Reynolds signed a multi-year deal with the Timberwolves, but was later waived by the Timberwolves on June 28, 2019.

=== Milwaukee Bucks/Wisconsin Herd (2019–2020) ===
Reynolds signed a two-way contract with the Milwaukee Bucks on July 26, 2019. In the deal he will split time between the Bucks and their NBA G League affiliate, the Wisconsin Herd. Reynolds did not ending up appearing in any games for the Bucks.

=== Austin Spurs (2020–2021) ===
On December 2, 2020, Reynolds was included in the training camp roster of the San Antonio Spurs, but was later waived by the Spurs on December 19 after appeared in one pre-season game. He ultimately landed on the roster of the Spurs' G League affiliate, the Austin Spurs, appearing in 14 games and averaging 16.1 points, 4.6 rebounds and 1.5 assists in 29.0 minutes.

=== San Antonio Spurs (2021) ===
On March 26, 2021, the San Antonio Spurs signed Reynolds to a 10-day contract.

=== Houston Rockets (2021) ===
On May 14, 2021, the Houston Rockets signed Reynolds to a 10-day contract.

=== Dolomiti Energia Trento (2021–2022) ===
On July 3, 2021, he has signed with Dolomiti Energia Trento of the Italian Lega Basket Serie A (LBA). On February 21, 2022, Reynolds' NBA G League rights were traded from the Austin Spurs to the Agua Caliente Clippers in exchange for Ky Bowman.

=== KK Budućnost (2022–2023) ===
On July 14, 2022, he signed with Budućnost VOLI of the Montenegrin First League.

=== Promitheas Patras (2023–2024) ===
On September 27, 2023, Reynolds signed with Greek club Promitheas Patras.

=== Maroussi (2024–2026) ===
In July 2024, Reynolds signed with the Greek club Maroussi B.C. of the Greek Basket League. On July 7, 2025, he renewed his contract with Maroussi for one more season.

=== Juventus Utena (2026–present) ===
On August 7, 2026, Reynolds signed with Juventus Utena of the Lithuanian Basketball League (LKL) and the Basketball Champions League (BCL).

== Career statistics ==
Legend
GP	Games played	GS	Games started	MPG	Minutes per game
FG%	Field goal percentage	3P%	3-point field goal percentage	FT%	Free throw percentage
RPG	Rebounds per game	APG	Assists per game	SPG	Steals per game
BPG	Blocks per game	PPG	Points per game	**Bold**	Career high

=== NBA ===
==== Regular season ====
Year	Team	GP	GS	MPG	FG%	3P%	FT%	RPG	APG	SPG	BPG	PPG
2018–19	Minnesota	**19**	0	13.6	**.423**	**.412**	**.889**	1.6	.7	**.3**	**.1**	5.0
2020–21	San Antonio	3	0	2.0	.500	–	–	.0	.0	.0	.0	0.7
2020–21	Houston	2	0	**17.0**	.313	.250	–	**2.5**	**1.0**	.0	.0	**6.5**
Career		24	0	12.5	.406	.381	.889	1.5	.6	.3	.1	4.6

=== College ===
Year	Team	GP	GS	MPG	FG%	3P%	FT%	RPG	APG	SPG	BPG	PPG
2013–14	Tulane	**34**	1	17.7	.261	.260	.543	2.1	.5	.3	.2	3.8
2014–15	Tulane	9	0	13.2	**.447**	.294	.000	2.9	1.2	.4	.0	5.2
2015–16	Tulane	30	8	20.6	.349	.267	**.824**	3.4	.6	.6	.2	6.6
2016–17	Tulane	31	29	35.2	.424	**.388**	.796	**6.8**	1.5	**.8**	.5	**17.0**
2017–18	Tulane	31	**31**	**36.0**	.408	.353	.703	6.3	**2.2**	**.8**	**.6**	15.1
Career		135	69	26.3	.387	.334	.716	4.5	1.2	.6	.3	10.1
