= Gediminas Petrauskas =

Lithuanian basketball coach (born 1985)

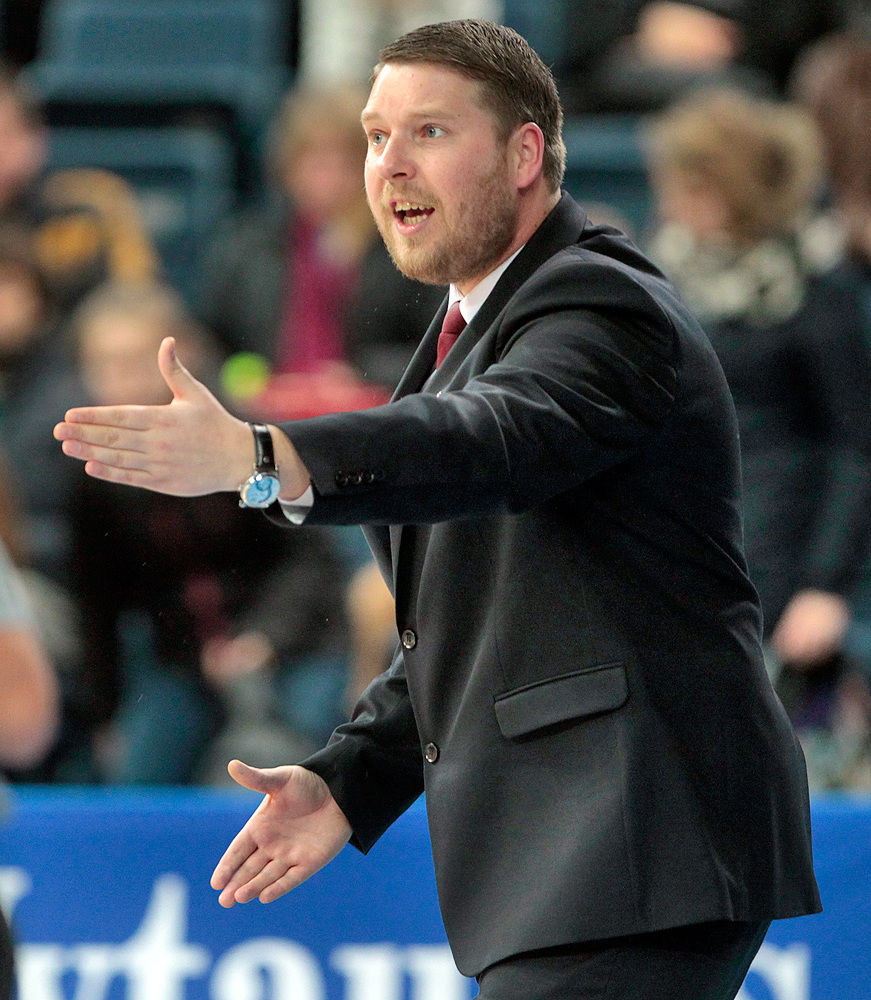
- Gediminas Petrauskas as BC Šiauliai head coach, 2015

Neptūnas Klaipėda
- Position: Head coach
- League: LKL

Personal information
- Born: 3 April 1985 (age 41) Kaunas, Lithuanian SSR, USSR

Career history

Coaching
- 2010–2011: Palanga
- 2011–2012: Kėdainiai Triobet
- 2012–2016: Šiauliai
- 2016–2017: Atomerőmű SE
- 2017: Juventus
- 2017–2021: Pieno žvaigždės
- 2021–2025: Nevėžis–OPTIBET
- 2025–present: Neptūnas Klaipėda

Career highlights
- As coach: LKF Cup bronze medal (2012); 3× BBL champion (2014, 2015, 2016)
Medals
Men's basketball
Head coach for Lithuania
FIBA U18 European Championship
Bronze medal – third place	2017 Slovakia	Team
FIBA Europe Under-16 Championship
Silver medal – second place	2015 Lithuania	National team

Gediminas Petrauskas (born 3 April 1985 in Kaunas, Lithuania) is a Lithuanian basketball coach. He is the head coach of Neptūnas Klaipėda.

== Lithuanian national team ==
Petrauskas was the head coach of the Lithuanian U-16 National Team during the 2015 FIBA Europe Under-16 Championship. The team won silver medals that year. He also was the head coach of the Lithuanian U-18 National Team during the 2017 FIBA U18 European Championship and won bronze medals.
