= Vaidas Čepukaitis =

Lithuanian basketball player (born 1989)

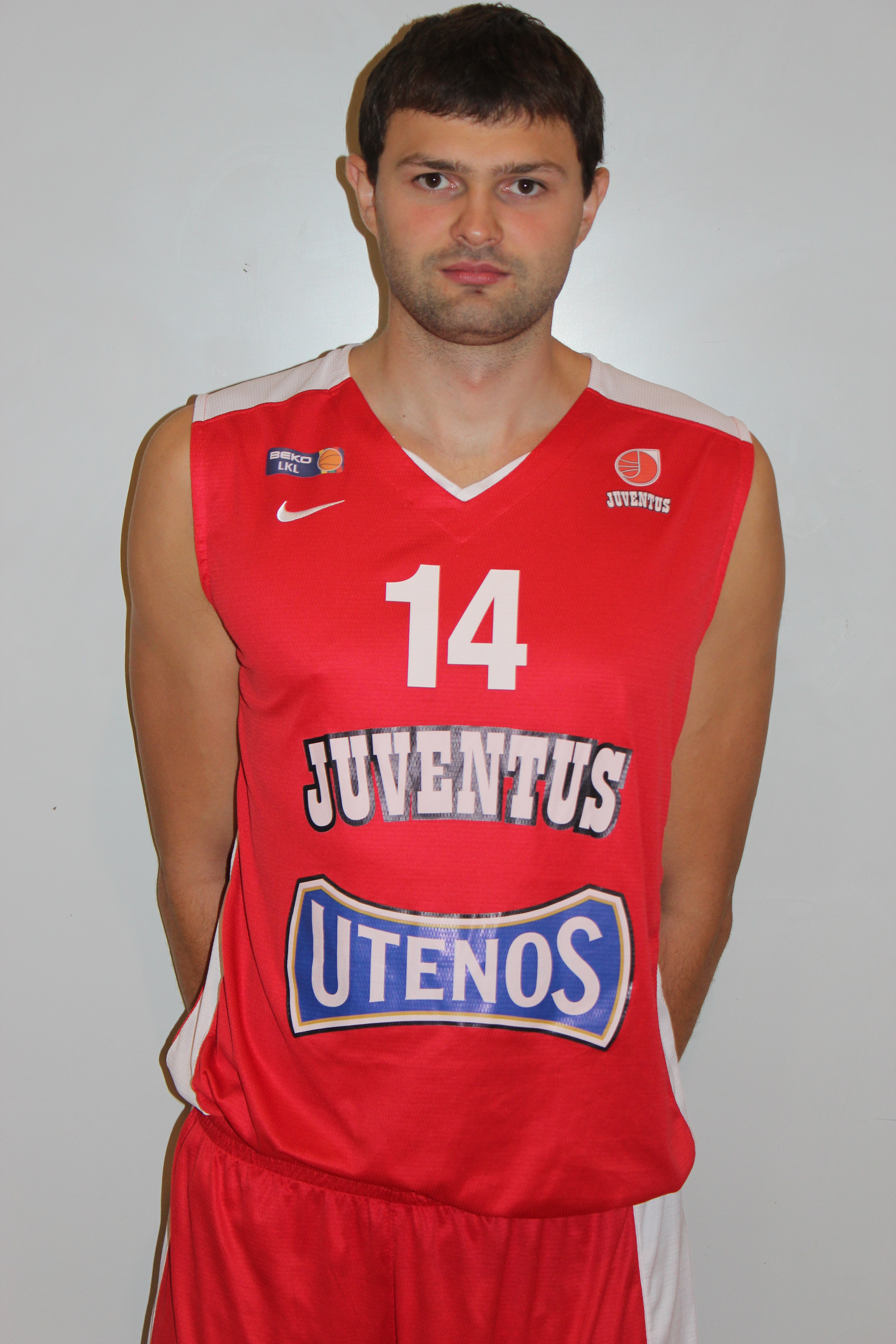
- Čepukaitis with Dzūkija Alytus in 2021

Ukmergės Stekas
- Position: Center
- League: NKL

Personal information
- Born: May 16, 1989 (age 37) Alytus, Lithuania
- Listed height: 2.07 m (6.8 ft)
- Listed weight: 107 kg (236 lb)

Career information
- Playing career: 2007–2007

Career history
- 2007–2009: Žalgiris-2
- 2008–2009: Triobet/Aisčiai Kaunas
- 2010–2011: Žalgiris-2
- 2011: Baltai Kaunas
- 2011–2012: Techasas Panevėžys
- 2012–2013: Pieno žvaigždės Pasvalys
- 2013–2014: TonyBet Prienai
- 2014–2015: Juventus Utena
- 2015–2016: Vytautas Prienai-Birštonas
- 2016–2017: Juventus Utena
- 2017–2018: Lietkabelis Panevėžys
- 2018–2019: Juventus Utena
- 2019–2020: CBet Prienai
- 2020–2021: Nevėžis Kėdainiai
- 2021: Juventus Utena
- 2021–2022: Alytus Dzūkija
- 2022: BC Wolves
- 2022–2024: Cáceres Ciudad del Baloncesto
- 2024-present: Ukmergės Stekas

Career highlights
- Lithuanian League blocks leader (2016)
Medals
Men's basketball
Representing Lithuania
FIBA Europe Under-20 Championship
Silver medal – second place	2008 Latvia	U-20 Team
FIBA Europe Under-18 Championship
Silver medal – second place	2006 Greece	U-18 Team

Vaidas Čepukaitis (born May 16, 1989) is a professional Lithuanian basketball player. He primarily plays the center and power forward positions.
