= Laurynas Beliauskas =

Lithuanian basketball player

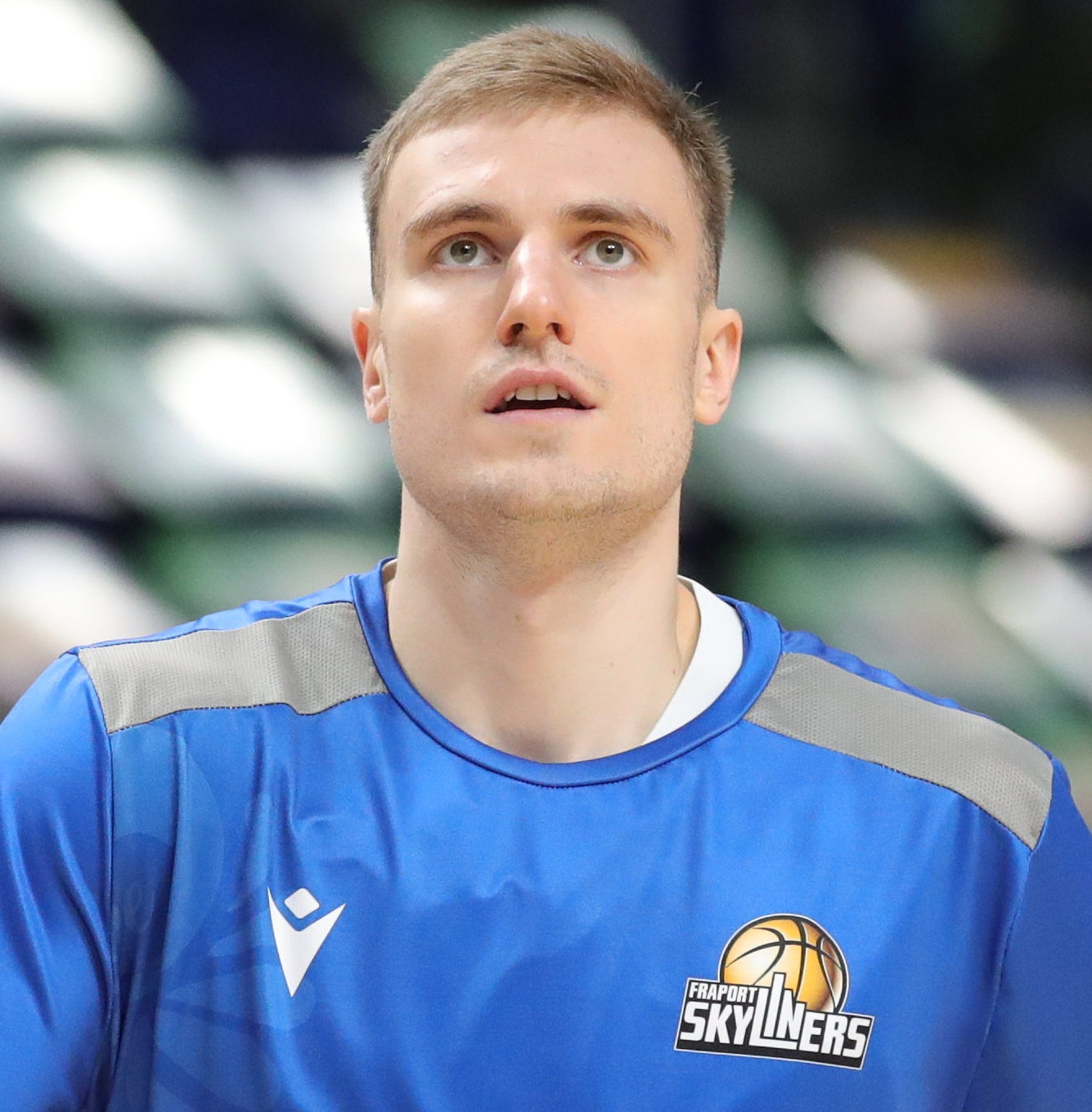
- Beliauskas with Skyliners Frankfurt in 2023

No. 9 – Juventus Utena
- Position: Shooting guard / point guard
- League: LKL; BCL

Personal information
- Born: 2 March 1997 (age 29) Klaipėda, Lithuania
- Listed height: 1.92 m (6 ft 4 in)
- Listed weight: 84 kg (185 lb)

Career information
- NBA draft: 2019: undrafted
- Playing career: 2014–present

Career history
- 2014–2019: Neptūnas Klaipėda
- 2014–2015: → Žalgiris-2 Kaunas
- 2015–2016: → Nafta-Uni-Akvaservis Klaipėda
- 2019–2020: Nevėžis Kėdainiai
- 2020–2022: Obradoiro
- 2022–2023: Skyliners Frankfurt
- 2023–2024: PAOK Thessaloniki
- 2024: Stal Ostrów Wielkopolski
- 2024–2025: Juventus Utena
- 2025–2026: Dinamo Sassari
- 2026–present: Juventus Utena

Career highlights
- Greek All-Star Game 3 Point Shootout Champion (2023)

Laurynas Beliauskas (born 2 March 1997) is a Lithuanian professional basketball player for Juventus Utena of the Lithuanian Basketball League (LKL) and the Basketball Champions League (BCL).

== Professional career ==
Beliauskas made his debut with Neptunas Klaipeda during the 2014–15 season. He played in 2014–15 Euroleague Basketball Next Generation Tournament for BC Žalgiris youth. Although his team didn't make to the final, he won the three-point shootout contest.

On 9 August 2023, Beliauskas signed with Greek club PAOK. On January 26, 2024, he requested to be released from the team. He was averaging 8.6 points and 2.9 rebounds per game, shooting with 36.7% from the three-point line.

On 2 February 2024, he signed with Stal Ostrów Wielkopolski of the Polish Basketball League (PLK). He averaged 17.4 points, 3.4 rebounds and 4.9 assists per game, shooting 44.7% from beyond the arc.

On 12 June 2024, Beliauskas signed a one-year deal with Juventus Utena of the Lithuanian Basketball League (LKL).

On 29 July 2025, he signed with Dinamo Sassari of the Lega Basket Serie A (LBA).

On 11 August 2026, Beliauskas signed with Juventus Utena of the Lithuanian Basketball League (LKL) and the Basketball Champions League (BCL).

== National team career ==
He won bronze medals with the Lithuania national team in 2015 FIBA Europe Under-18 Championship.
