= BC Nevėžis =

Basketball team in Kėdainiai, Lithuania

Nevėžis–Paskolų klubas
- Leagues: Lithuanian Basketball League
- Founded: 1992; 34 years ago
- History: BC Nevėžis (1992–2011); BC Kėdainiai Triobet (2011–2012); BC Nevėžis (2012–2020); Nevėžis-OPTIBET (2020–2025); Nevėžis–Paskolų klubas (2025–present)
- Arena: Kėdainiai Arena
- Capacity: 2,200
- Location: Kėdainiai, Lithuania
- Team colors: Green, black and white
- Team manager: Mindaugas Arlauskas
- Head coach: Evaldas Beržininkaitis
- Team captain: Vacant
- Championships: LKAL Champions (2002); BBL Challenge Cup (2008); BBL Cup (2013)
- Website: www.kknevezis.lt
Home	Away

BC Nevėžis (Lithuanian: Krepšinio klubas Nevėžis), commonly known as Nevėžis Kėdainiai, also known as Nevėžis–Paskolų klubas due to sponsorship reasons, is a professional basketball club based in Kėdainiai, Lithuania. The club currently competes in the Lithuanian Basketball League (LKL).

== History ==
BC Nevėžis was founded in 1992 by Stasys Mickevičius. In 1993 BC Nevėžis was renamed to KK Notra because of the club supporters UAB Notra. In 1999 because of the supporters changes, BC Notra was renamed to BC Nevėžis again until now. Club name came from the Nevėžis River, flowing through Kėdainiai city. Nevėžis first played in the second division LKAL (now - National Basketball League (Lithuania)), winning the title in 2002 and qualifying to the Lithuanian Basketball League. Nevėžis became a constant playoff contender, with the highest achievements being reaching the semifinals of the LKL in 2006, even taking future champion BC Lietuvos rytas to the limit, losing the series 1:2. They also reached the Baltic Basketball League semifinals in 2006, and won the BBL Challenge Cup in 2008. Nevėžis also won 3rd place in the LKF Cup in 2007 and 2012.

In 2017, after defeating the AEK Larnaca during the last qualification stage, Nevėžis qualified to the 2017–18 FIBA Europe Cup season, their first-ever European competition.

== Players ==
=== Current roster ===
Note: Flags indicate national team eligibility at FIBA-sanctioned events. Players may hold other non-FIBA nationalities not displayed.

Nevėžis–Paskolų klubas roster
Players
Coaches

Pos.	No.	Nat.	Name	Ht.	Wt.	Age
F	1	(United States)	Gray, Aaron	2.01 m (6 ft 7 in)	98 kg (216 lb)	25 – 28 November 2000
F/C	2	(United States)	Wiley, Jacob	2.03 m (6 ft 8 in)	95 kg (209 lb)	28 – 16 September 1998
PG	3	(United States)	Hopkins, Javontae	1.83 m (6 ft 0 in)	75 kg (165 lb)	25 – 6 July 2001
G	4	(United States)	Andrews, Dylan	1.90 m (6 ft 3 in)	81 kg (179 lb)	24 – 24 October 2002
PF	5	(Lithuania)	Kancleris, Modestas	2.06 m (6 ft 9 in)	88 kg (194 lb)	25 – 1 June 2001
PG	7	(Lithuania)	Sabutis, Neilas	1.83 m (6 ft 0 in)	75 kg (165 lb)	18 – 7 September 2008
F/C	8	(Lithuania)	Klimavičius, Mikalojus	2.02 m (6 ft 8 in)	108 kg (238 lb)	19 – 27 August 2007
G/F	9	(Lithuania)	Zakas, Jonas	1.90 m (6 ft 3 in)	85 kg (187 lb)	29 – 14 October 1997
PG	10	(Lithuania)	Bukauskas, Nojus	1.84 m (6 ft 0 in)	80 kg (176 lb)	21 – 12 August 2005
G/F	11	(Lithuania)	Montvila, Nedas	1.94 m (6 ft 4 in)	91 kg (201 lb)	24 – 15 September 2002
F/C	14	(Lithuania)	Petrilevičius, Paulius (C)	2.00 m (6 ft 7 in)	96 kg (212 lb)	35 – 23 March 1991
F/C	35	(Lithuania)	Lavrinovičius, Danielius	2.06 m (6 ft 9 in)	105 kg (231 lb)	27 – 22 January 1999
G/F	77	(United Kingdom)	Boardman-Raffet, Flynn	1.96 m (6 ft 5 in)	95 kg (209 lb)	24 – 26 February 2002

Head coach

- (Lithuania) Evaldas Beržininkaitis

Assistant coach(es)

- (Lithuania) Aistis Pilauskas
- (Lithuania) Liucijus Biekša

Athletic trainer(s)

- (Lithuania) Mantas Vasiliauskas

Legend

- (C) Team captain
- Injured

- Roster
Updated: 10 October 2026

=== Depth chart ===
Pos.	Starting 5	Bench 1	Bench 2
C	Paulius Petrilevičius	Jacob Wiley	Mikalojus Klimavičius
PF	Danielius Lavrinovičius	Aaron Gray
SF	Flynn Boardman-Raffet	Jonas Zakas
SG	Dylan Andrews	Nedas Montvila
PG	Javontae Hopkins	Nojus Bukauskas	Neilas Sabutis

=== Squad changes for/during the 2026–27 season ===
==== In ====
No.	Pos.	Nat.	Name	Moving from	
—	HC	(Lithuania)	Evaldas Beržininkaitis	Alvark Tokyo	(Japan)
1	F	(United States)	Aaron Gray	BC Komárno	(Slovakia)
2	F/C	(United States)	Jacob Wiley	Gence BC	(Azerbaijan)
3	PG	(United States)	Javontae Hopkins	Sloga	(Serbia)
4	G	(United States)	Dylan Andrews	Boise State	(United States)
5	PF	(Lithuania)	Modestas Kancleris	Nuova Pallacanestro Vigevano 1955	(Italy)
7	PG	(Lithuania)	Neilas Sabutis	Kėdainių sporto centras	(Lithuania)
8	F/C	(Lithuania)	Mikalojus Klimavičius	Kėdainių sporto centras	(Lithuania)
14	PF	(Lithuania)	Paulius Petrilevičius	BC Gargždai	(Lithuania)
35	F/C	(Lithuania)	Danielius Lavrinovičius	Lietkabelis Panevėžys	(Lithuania)
77	G/F	(United Kingdom)	Flynn Boardman-Raffet	Leicester Riders	(United Kingdom)

==== Out ====
No.	Pos.	Nat.	Name	Moving to	
2	G/F	(United States)	Jarred Godfrey	Free agent	
3	G	(Lithuania)	Justinas Ramanauskas	Sūduva	(Lithuania)
4	G	(United States)	Josh Jefferson	CSM Oradea	(Romania)
5	G/F	(Angola)	Selton Miguel	GTK Gliwice	(Poland)
7	F/C	(Lithuania)	Lukas Valantinas	CBet Jonava	(Lithuania)
11	F/C	(Sweden)	Kenny Pohto	Juventus Utena	(Lithuania)
17	F	(Lithuania)	Justinas Marcinkevičius	Free agent	(Lithuania)
21	C	(Canada) (Republic of the Congo)	J.D. Muila	Vienna	(Austria)
22	F/C	(Lithuania)	Ignas Vaitkus	Free agent	
24	G/F	(United States)	Trenton McLaughlin	Split	(Croatia)

== Logos ==
Nevėžis new logo (2020–2025)

Nevėžis–Paskolų klubas logo (2025–present)

== Season by season ==
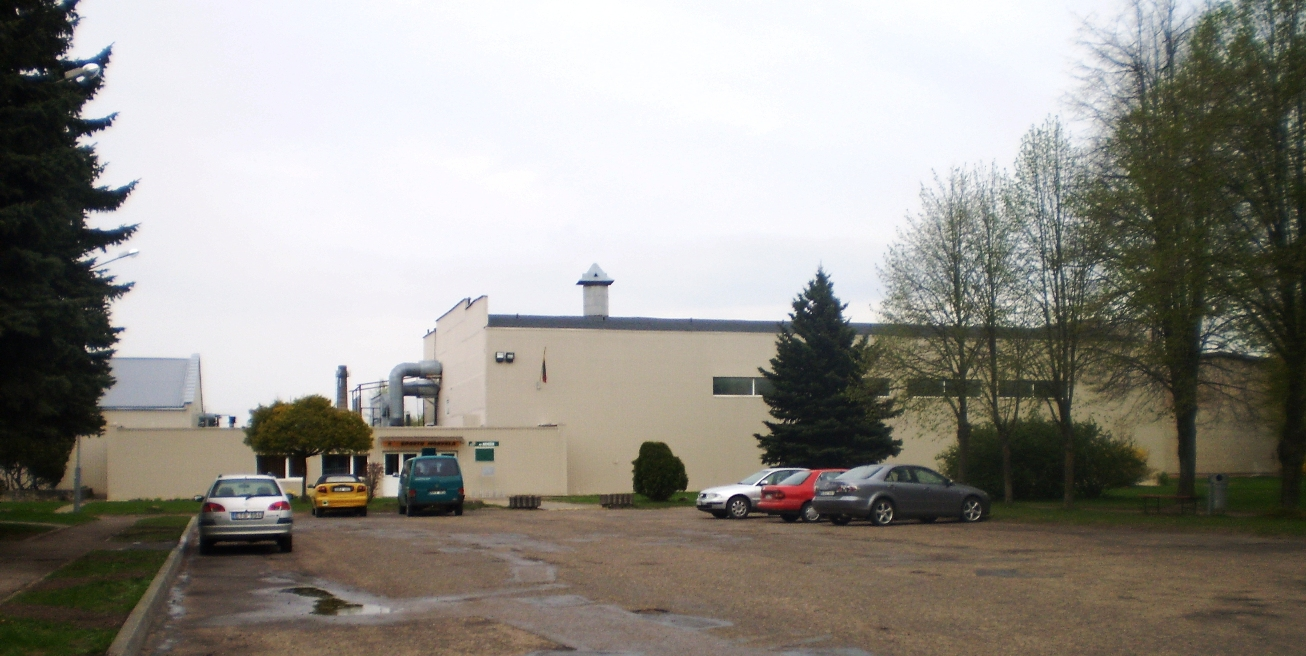
Kėdainiai Sports School in Vilainiai is the place where BC Nevėžis previously played its home matches.

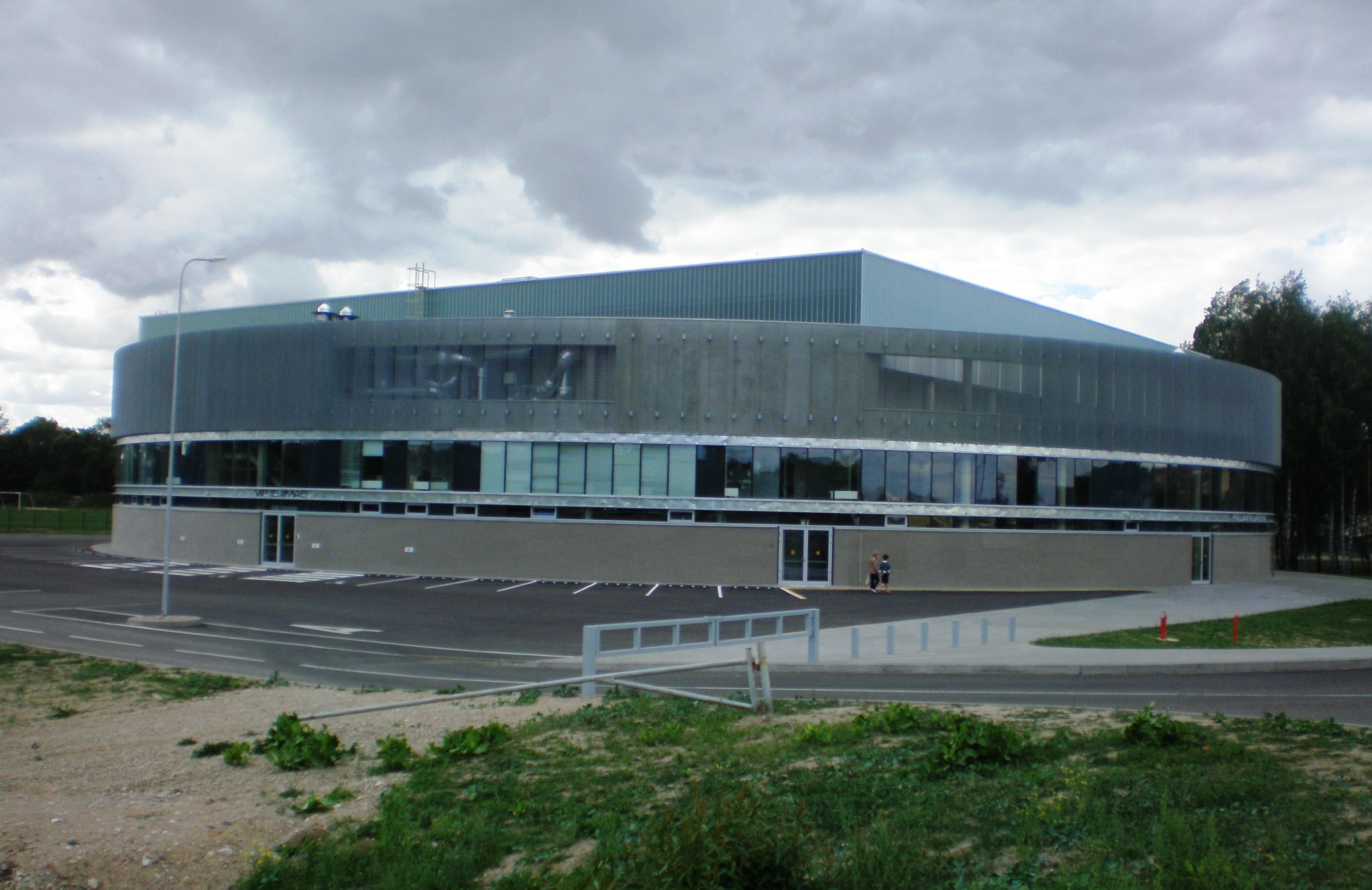
BC Nevėžis moved to the newly built Kėdainiai Arena in 2013.

Season	Tier	League	Pos.	National cup	Baltic League	Pos.	European competitions	
2000–01	2	LKAL	5th					
2001–02	2	LKAL	1st					
2002–03	1	LKL	10th					
2003–04	1	LKL	7th					
2004–05	1	LKL	6th		Challenge Cup	3rd		
2005–06	1	LKL	4th		Elite Division	4th		
2006–07	1	LKL	5th	Third qualified	Elite Division	10th		
2007–08	1	LKL	6th		Challenge Cup	1st		
2008–09	1	LKL	5th	Quarterfinalist	Elite Division	10th		
2009–10	1	LKL	12th	Fourth qualified	Elite Division	10th		
2010–11	1	LKL	9th	Third round	Elite Division	8th		
2011–12	1	LKL	7th	Third qualified	Elite Division	7th		
2012–13	1	LKL	8th	Semifinalist	Regular season			
2013–14	1	LKL	8th	Fifth round	Quarterfinalist			
2014–15	1	LKL	10th		Group stage			
2015–16	1	LKL	9th	Quarterfinalist	Quarterfinalist			
2016–17	1	LKL	9th		Quarterfinalist			
2017–18	1	LKL	8th				4 FIBA Europe Cup	R2
2018–19	1	LKL	9th	Second round				
2019–20	1	LKL	10th	Second round				
2020–21	1	LKL	10th	Second round				
2021–22	1	LKL	10th	First round				
2022–23	1	LKL	8th	Quarterfinalist				
2023–24	1	LKL	9th	Eightfinal			4 FIBA Europe Cup	QT
2024–25	1	LKL	9th	Quarterfinals				
2025–26	1	LKL	9th	Quarterfinals				

Detailed information of former rosters and results.

== Head coaches ==
- (Lithuania) Stasys Mickevičius: 1993–1998
- (Lithuania) Saulius Gaurilčikas: 1998–2002
- (Lithuania) Rūtenis Paulauskas: 2002–2004
- (Lithuania) Gintaras Leonavičius: 2004–2009, 2012–2014
- (Lithuania) Nerijus Zabarauskas: 2009
- (Lithuania) Kastytis Kundrotas: 2009–2010
- (Lithuania) Rimas Girskis: 2010
- (Lithuania) Gintaras Krapikas: 2010–2011
- (Lithuania) Valerijus Kuprijanovas: 2011–2012
- (Lithuania) Darius Sirtautas: 2012
- (Lithuania) Virginijus Sirvydis: 2014
- (Lithuania) Mindaugas Budzinauskas: 2014–2015
- (Lithuania) Ramūnas Cvirka: 2015–2016, 2017–2018, 2019
- (Lithuania) Paulius Juodis: 2016–2017
- (Lithuania) Darius Dimavičius: 2018–2019
- (Lithuania) Marius Kiltinavičius: 2019–2020, 2021
- (United States) David Gale: 2020–2021
- (Lithuania) Gediminas Petrauskas: 2021–2025
- (Lithuania) Laimonas Eglinskas: 2025–2026
- (Lithuania) Evaldas Beržininkaitis: 2026–present

== Notable players ==
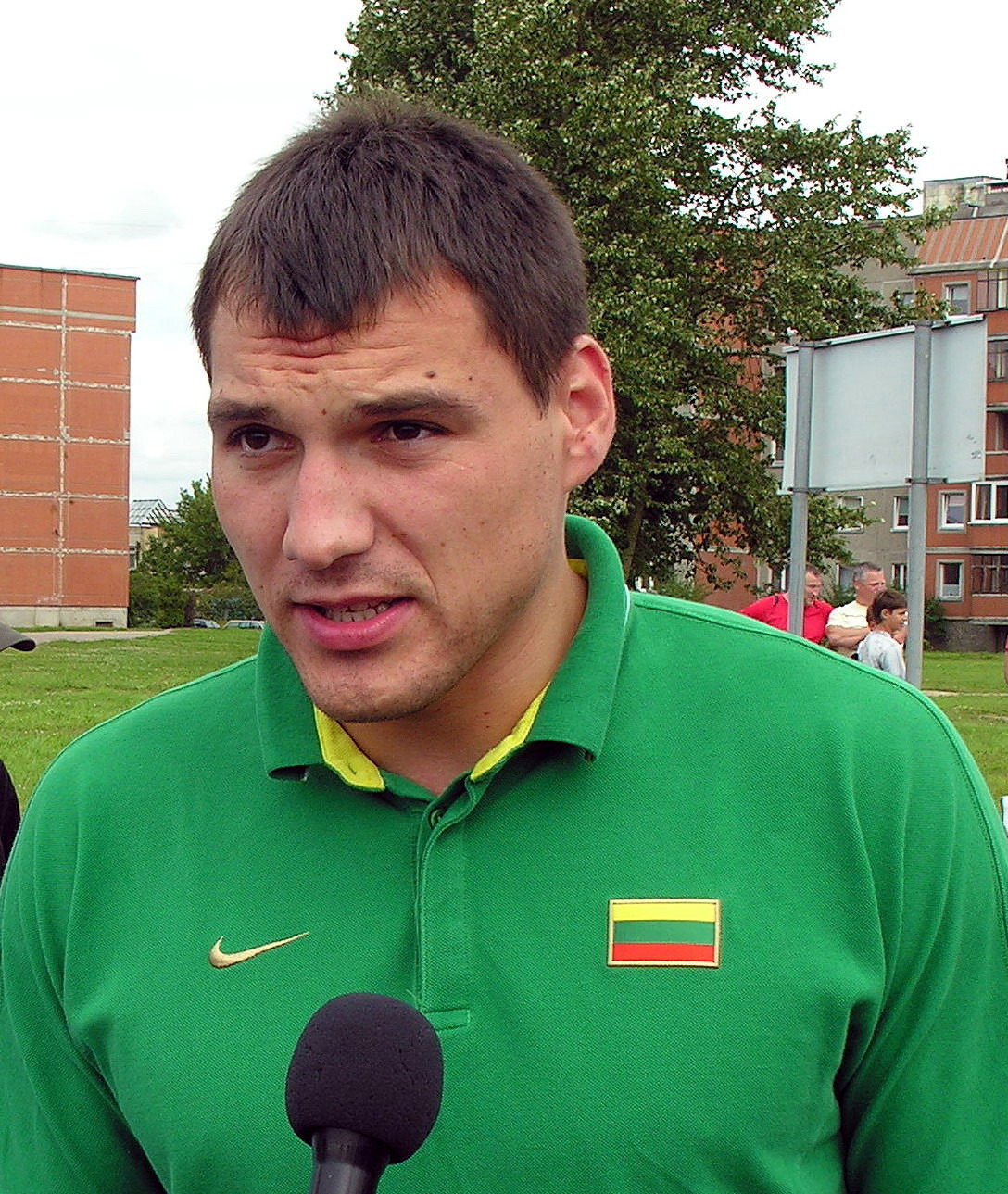
Jonas Mačiulis was a Nevėžis team leader in the 04–05 season.

- Lithuania:
  - (Lithuania) Jonas Mačiulis 2004–2005
  - (Lithuania) Simonas Serapinas 2003
  - (Lithuania) Darius Šilinskis 2004–2005, 2008–2010, 2012–2014
  - (Lithuania) Gytis Sirutavičius 2005–2007, 2012–2013
  - (Lithuania) Benas Veikalas 2007–2009
  - (Lithuania) Gintaras Leonavičius 2007–2009, 2013–2014
  - (Lithuania) Darius Gvezdauskas 2009–2010, 2015–2016
  - (Lithuania) Vytenis Čižauskas 2010–2011, 2021–2022
  - (Lithuania) Vidas Ginevičius 2011–2012, 2013–2014
  - (Lithuania) Vytenis Jasikevičius 2011–2013
  - (Lithuania) Mindaugas Girdžiūnas 2012–2013
  - (Lithuania) Vilmantas Dilys 2013–2014
  - (Lithuania) Tauras Jogėla 2013–2014
  - (Lithuania) Simas Buterlevičius 2013–2014, 2018–2019
  - (Lithuania) Žydrūnas Kelys 2013–2014
  - (Lithuania) Arvydas Šikšnius 2013–2014
  - (Lithuania) Vaidotas Volkus 2014–2016, 2016–2018
  - (Lithuania) Justas Tamulis 2014–2015, 2017–2018, 2019–2020
  - (Lithuania) Mindaugas Kupšas 2015–2016
  - (Lithuania) Justas Sinica 2016–2017
  - (Lithuania) Karolis Petrukonis 2016–2017
  - (Lithuania) Ignas Vaitkus 2016–2017, 2023–now
  - (Lithuania) Giedrius Staniulis 2017–2018
  - (Lithuania) Margiris Normantas 2017–2018
  - (Lithuania) Tadas Sedekerskis 2017–2018
  - (Lithuania) Gabrielius Maldūnas 2017–2019
  - (Lithuania) Gintautas Matulis 2017–2019
  - (Lithuania) Regimantas Miniotas 2018–2019
  - (Lithuania) Martynas Varnas 2018–2019
  - (Lithuania) Laurynas Beliauskas 2019–2020
  - (Lithuania) Arminas Urbutis 2019–2020
  - (Lithuania) Kristupas Žemaitis 2019–2020
  - (Lithuania) Julius Kazakauskas 2019–2021
  - (Lithuania) Vaidas Kariniauskas 2020
  - (Lithuania) Vaidas Čepukaitis 2020–2021
  - (Lithuania) Paulius Murauskas 2021–2022
  - (Lithuania) Marius Valinskas 2021–2023
  - (Lithuania) Danielius Lavrinovičius 2021–2023

- Latvia
  - (Latvia) Rihards Kuksiks 2017–2018, 2021–2022
  - (Latvia) Artūrs Žagars 2022–2023
- Greece
  - (Greece) Georgios Kalaitzakis 2019–2020
  - (Greece) Panagiotis Kalaitzakis 2019–2021
- France
  - (France) Daryl Doualla 2021–2023
- Germany
  - (Germany) Ariel Hukporti 2020–2021
- Italy
  - (Italy) Abramo Canka 2020–2021
- Senegal
  - (Senegal) Amar Sylla 2021–2022
- Belgium
  - (Belgium) Tim Lambrecht 2022–2023
- Ukraine
  - (Ukraine) Oleksandr Kolchenko 2015–2016
  - (Ukraine) Vladislav Korenyuk 2017–2018
- Croatia
  - (Croatia) Toni Prostran 2016–2017
  - (Croatia) Sven Smajlagic 2021–2022
  - (Croatia) Lovre Basic 2023
- Serbia
  - (Serbia) Ivan Smiljanić 2016–2017
- United States
  - (United States) Brad Davison 2022–2023
  - (United States) Sedrick Barefield 2020–2021
  - (United States) E.J Montgomery 2020–2021
  - (United States) T.J Starks 2021–2022
  - (United States) Brevin Galloway 2023
  - (United States) Sean McNeil 2023-
  - (United States) Zane Waterman 2023-
- Russia
  - (Russia) Alexander Klyuev 2014–2015
  - (Russia) Alexander Zakharov 2017–2018
  - (Russia) Valery Likhodey 2017–2018
  - (Russia) Zakhar Vedischev 2019
- Brasil
  - (Brazil) Rafael Luz 2021
