= BC Juventus =

Basketball team in Utena, Lithuania

Juventus Utena
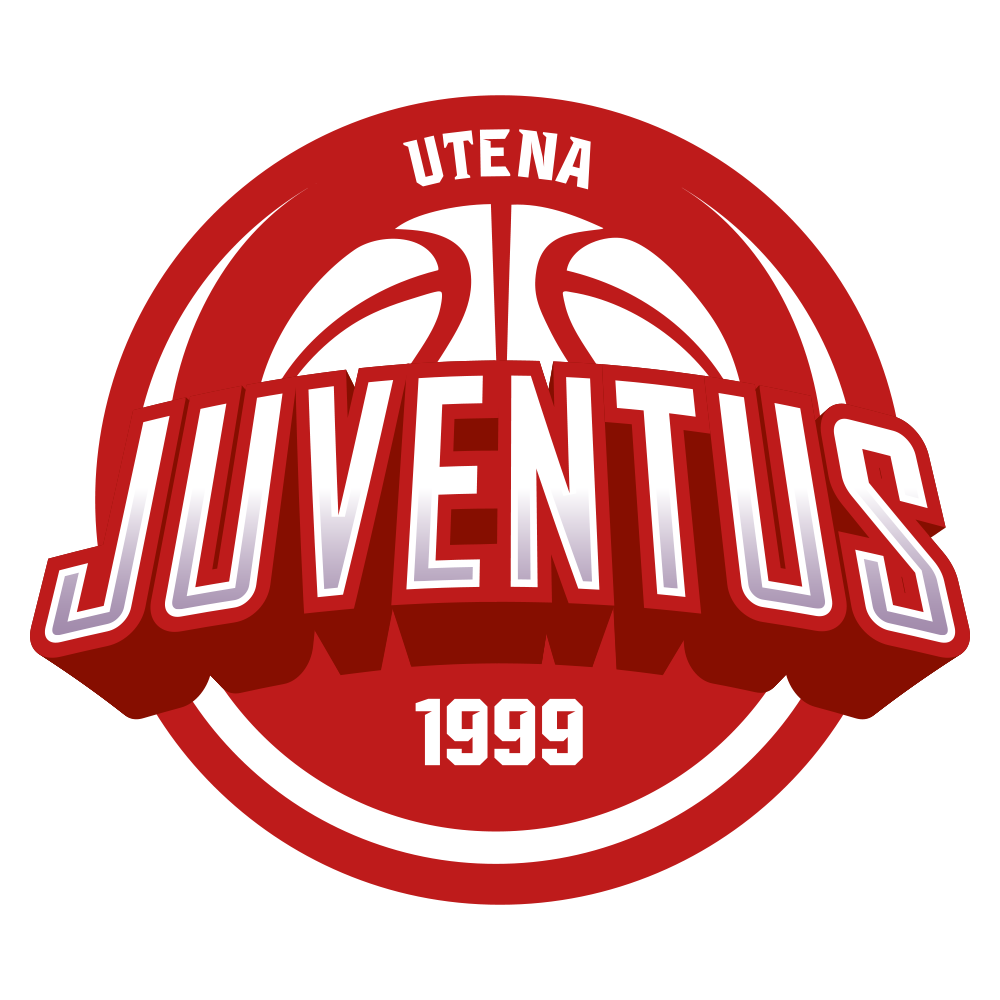
- Nickname: Juvė
- Leagues: LKL; Champions League
- Founded: 1999
- History: Juventus (1999–2004); Juventus LKSK (2004–2009); Juventus (2009–2021); Uniclub Casino Juventus (2021–2024); Uniclub Bet Juventus (2024–2025); Juventus (2025–present)
- Arena: Utena Arena; Arena Vilnius (For BCL games)
- Capacity: 2,500; 10,000
- Location: Utena, Lithuania
- Team colors: Red, white and black
- Team manager: Eimantas Skersis
- Head coach: Laimonas Eglinskas
- Team captain: Šarūnas Beniušis
- Championships: 1 LKBL; 1 RKL; 1 BBL Challenge Cup
- Website: utenosjuventus.lt
Home	Away

BC Juventus (Lithuanian: Krepšinio klubas Juventus), commonly known as Juventus Utena is a professional basketball club based in Utena, Lithuania. Founded in 1999, the team plays domestically in the Lithuanian Basketball League (LKL) and internationally in the Basketball Champions League.

== History ==
=== 2000–2007: foundation and participation in RKL ===
Juventus basketball club was founded in 1999 and debuted in Naujametinis Utenos rajono Mero taurės turnyras (Utena's new year's mayor's cup tournament) and took third place. First team roster consisted of other sports players: football players and one handball player. First team captain, which also founded Juventus basketball team was football player Nerijus Kuzmickas (played in Kauno Inkaras team), now Šiauliai football academy, child and teenage coach. In the debut Juventus season also played: Egidijus Varnas (FK Ekranas), Tomas Keraitis, Tomas Karvelis and others.

In 2003–2004 season, Juventus basketball team was coached by Rimvydas Vaitkus. Juventus debuted in Lithuania basketball B league and in their debut season, BC Juventus took sixth place.

After year, in 2004–2005 season, Juventus basketball team was coached by Mindaugas Kildišius. Juventus basketball team first time in the club history won LKBL championship (same like RKL) and won right to participate in the LKAL championship (same like NKL). But because of various bureaucracy barriers, Juventus basketball team wasn't permitted to debut in the second-tier Lithuania basketball league.

During 2005–2006 season, BC Juventus took third place in RKL tournament. One season later, Juventus won RKL championship once again and in transition match to the NKL championship, BC Juventus won against Kauno LKKA-Atletas basketball team. But this wasn't the end for Juventus in the 2006–2007 season as BC Juventus went until third Lithuania basketball federation (LKF) stage and only there, after two unremitting matches lost to Klaipėdos Neptūnas. Same year, team coach Mindaugas Kildišius, was named the best RKL championship coach.

=== 2007–2009: NKL ===
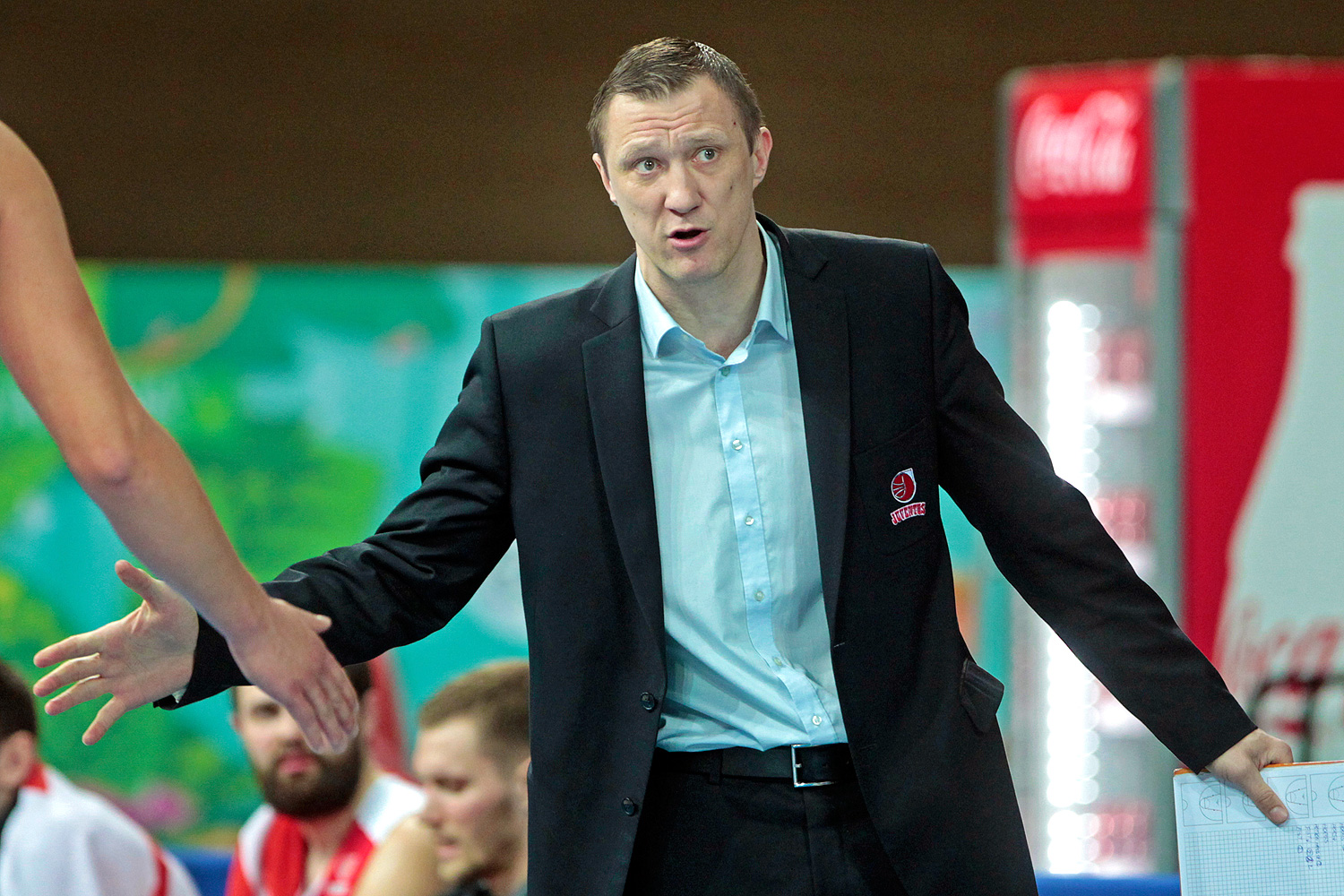
Žydrūnas Urbonas joined Juventus in 2009 and later became president of the club.

In 2007–2008 season Utena's basketball team debuted in the NKL championship and won regular season (25 wins and 7 losses), however in the final standings BC Juventus took only fourth place. In the end of 2007, Juventus guard Raimondas Ambrulaitis was named "Lithuania basketball discovery of the year", team coach Mindaugas Kildišius was named the best 2007–2008 NKL season coach.

One year later, Juventus basketball team won NKL regular season once again and participated in NKL championship semi-finals. In 2009, Juventus wasn't able to participate in the NKL finals, because of that team coach Mindaugas Kildišius retired from his position. Also because of that, Mindaugas Kildišius assistant Rolandas Urkis coached Juventus basketball team until the end of the season. On 15 June 2009 LKF decided to let Juventus basketball team participate in the Lithuania super basketball league LKL because of the commercial principles. For the permission to participate in the Lithuanian Basketball League (LKL), Juventus basketball team had to pay 350 thousand LTL.

=== 2009–present: LKL ===
==== 2009–2010 season ====
On 20 August 2009 Gintaras Kručkauskas became main Juventus basketball team coach. The 2009–2010 Lithuanian Basketball League (LKL) season Juventus basketball team took fourth place in the LKL championship.

On 7 July 2010 Robertas Giedraitis became main BC Juventus coach.

==== 2010–2011 season ====
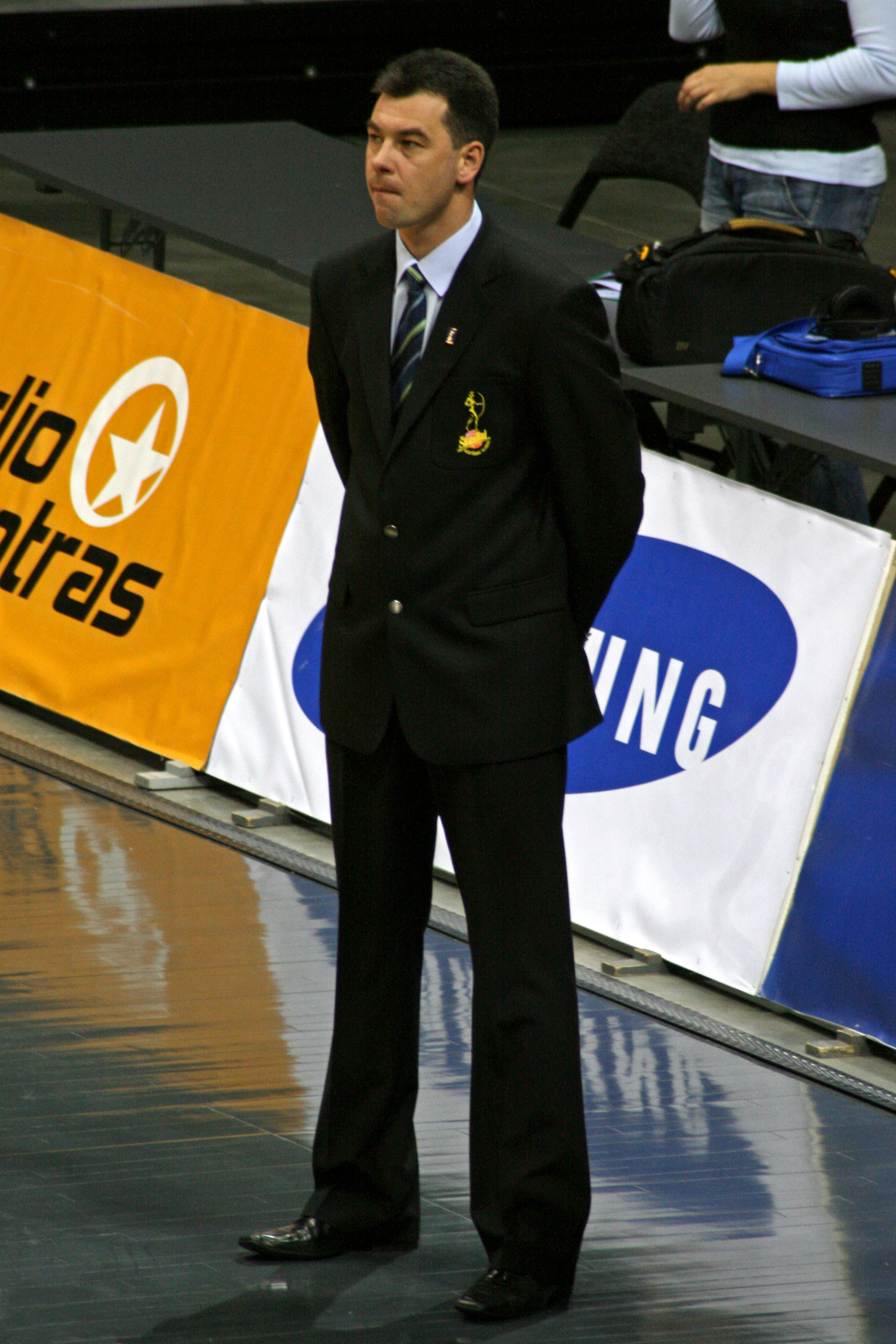
Robertas Giedraitis, a head coach of Juventus in 2010–2012

During 2010–2011 season, BC Juventus first time in the club history became Baltic Basketball League Challenge Cup champions. Also BC "Juventus" made a huge surprise as they eliminated 7-time LKL Bronze streaker Šiauliai in the first round of LKL playoffs (first game: 105:94, second game: 91:81). After eliminating Šiauliai in quarter-final, BC Juventus reached LKL semi finals and met Lithuania basketball powerhouse Žalgiris. On 27 April 2011 BC Juventus lost first game at Kaunas Sports Hall against Žalgiris with result 63–95, the second match took place on 29 April 2011 in Utena. Juventus lost the second game too and had to fight for LKL Bronze against Rūdupis. Juventus lost first Bronze game at Prienai with result 65–79, the second game was unsuccessful for Juventus too as they lost it in their home arena in Utena with result 73–98. The third game took place in Prienai, which Juventus team lost with result 83–84, because of that they lost Bronze series 0–3 against Rūdupis and took fourth place in the LKL championship that season.

==== 2011–2012 and 2012–2013 seasons ====
In the 2011–2012 and 2012–2013 seasons, Juventus did not accomplish anything notable. After the 2011–2012 season, where Juventus missed the playoffs entirely, Robertas Giedraitis was fired as head coach. After Rytis Vaišvila was hired as head coach, Juventus made the playoffs in 2013, and fought valiantly against Lietuvos rytas, though losing the series 0–2.

==== 2013–2014 season ====
In the 2013–2014 season, Juventus replaced coach Vaišvila with former longtime Žalgiris player, coach and sports director Vitoldas Masalskis. Despite high hopes, the season started poorly, and coach Masalskis was replaced with Virginijus Sirvydis, former longtime player in the LKL. The move helped the team regroup and reach the playoffs, but lost to TonyBet Prienai 0:2. The team also played in the BBL Elite division, but didn't make the playoff stage for two straight seasons.

==== 2014–2015 season ====
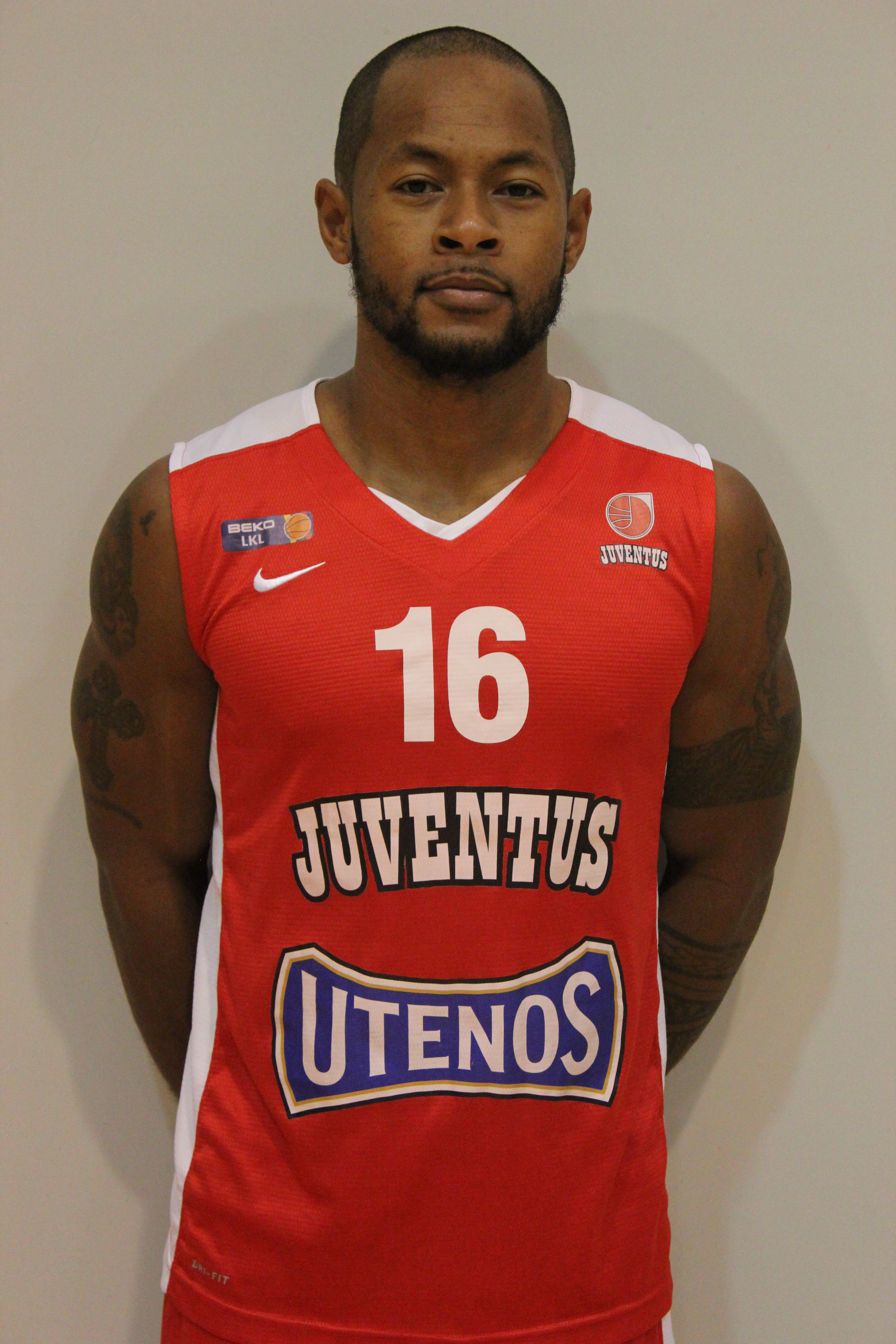
Rashaun Broadus, the star of the team in the 2014–15 season

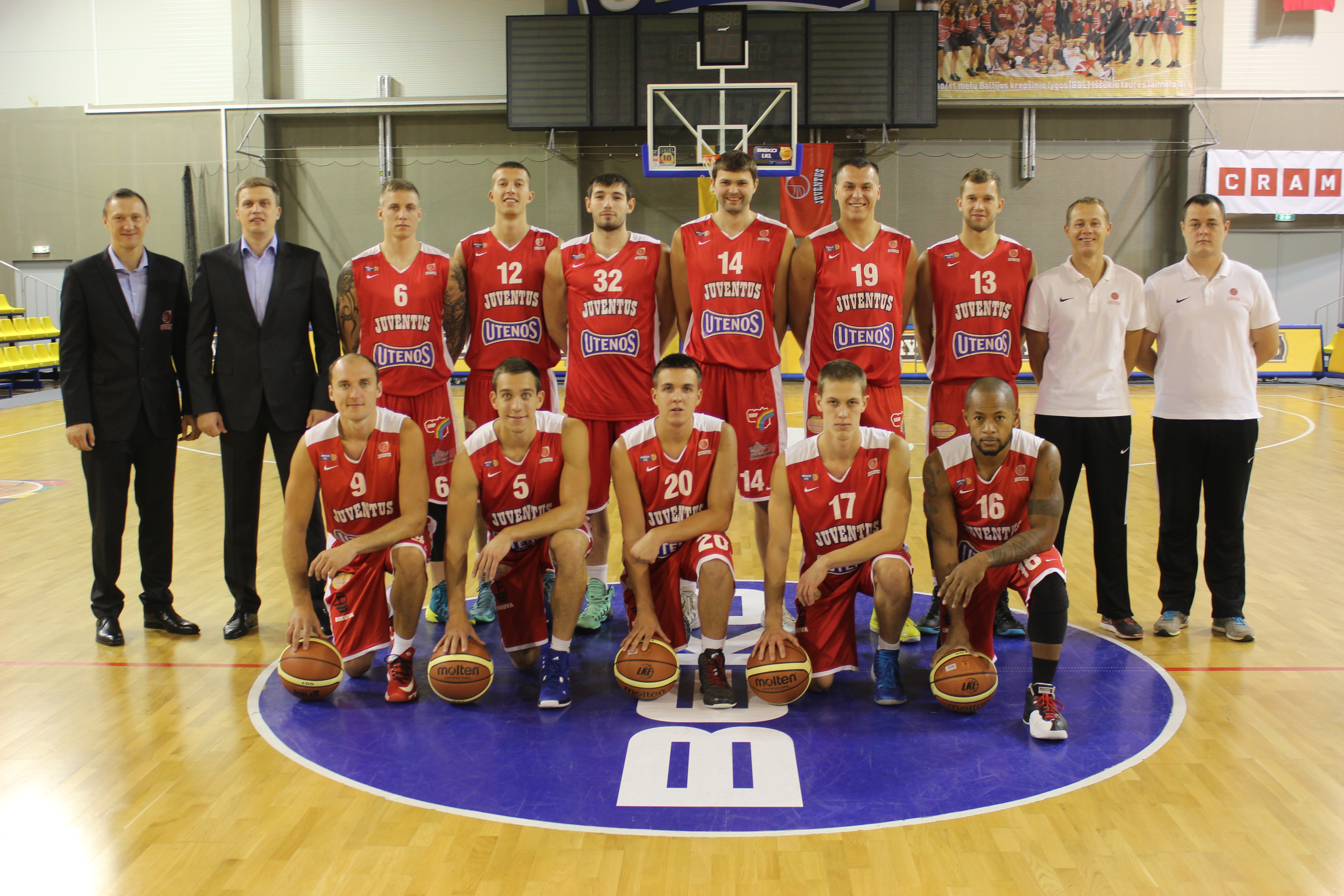
BC Juventus, prior the 2014–15 season (LKL bronze medalists)

In 2014–15 LKL season the club reached new highs. Before the season, the well-known Rashaun Broadus was signed, and quickly became the leader of the team. The team took 5th place during the regular LKL season and in the quarterfinals they met the 4th seed Pieno žvaigždės. After the impressive series, Juventus overcome Pieno žvaigždės 3–2 and qualified into the LKL semifinals for the third time in club's history. Despite having a regular season victory over BC Žalgiris, Juventus was no match for BC Žalgiris in the semifinals, losing the series 0:3. Though, Juventus shockingly defeated EuroLeague participant Neptūnas 3:2 and won LKL bronze medals for the first time in club's history. Rashaun Broadus led the team with 25 points and 10 assists in the crucial game. His comment following the game was: "We don't care what anybody thinks about us. We played hard every game. Everybody told us that we will be down 3–0 and now we won medals". Juventus also finished 4th in the LKF Cup, as well as winning the bronze medals in the BBL, capping off the most successful season in club history.

==== 2015–2016 season ====
In 2015–2016 season Utenos Juventus was invited compete in EuroCup for the first time in the club history as LKL bronze medalists. Though, they decided to choose the FIBA Europe Cup version instead. By preparing for their debut in the first-ever European competition, BC Juventus signed with former Lithuania men's national basketball team head coach Antanas Sireika to replace the LKL bronze medals winning Dainius Adomaitis, who signed with Neptūnas Klaipėda. Juventus qualified into the second stage of the FIBA Europe Cup by being the second-best team among teams which took third place in their groups. After successfully playing at the Round of 32 where they took first place in the group, Juventus advanced into the playoffs but there they were immediately eliminated by the Croatian powerhouse Cibona Zagreb after two close games (78–83, 84–87). In the LKL playoffs, Juventus defeated Vytautas in the quarterfinals 3–2, but lost to Žalgiris in the semifinal sweep 0–3. In the bronze medal game, Juventus lost to BC Lietuvos rytas 0–3.

==== 2016–2017 season ====
In 2016–2017 season Juventus qualified into the Basketball Champions League after crushing FC Porto 77–59 on 29 September 2016. In the Champions League group stage, Juventus qualified to the playoffs, finishing 4th in the group with an 8–6 record. In the playoffs, Juventus faced the legendary AEK team, and were eliminated, losing both at home 77:78, and away 54:75. In February, Juventus also delivered the biggest shock in the King Mindaugas Cup tournament, eliminating champion BC Lietuvos rytas 87:84 in the quarterfinals. In the tournament semifinals, Juventus lost a hard-fought game to another favorite, Lietkabelis, 70:75, but won the 3-rd place game against rival Vytautas 70:61. In the 2017 LKL Playoffs, Juventus faced Neptūnas in the quarterfinals – they were no match for Neptūnas, who swept the series 3:0 in dominating fashion, with a 19-point average.

==== 2017–2018 season ====
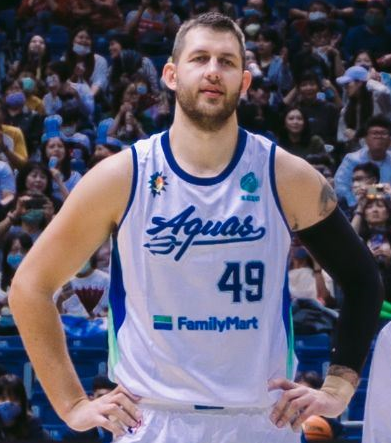
Mindaugas Kupšas, the most efficient player of Juventus in the 2024–2025 LKL season

Before the 2017–2018 season, team star and LKL MVP Jamar Diggs left to play in France and coach Sireika returned to BC Šiauliai. Juventus signed strong players like Anthony Ireland, LaRon Dendy, Jonte Flowers and the stars of the 2015 season in which Juventus won 3rd place, Arvydas Šikšnius and Simas Buterlevičius. Coach Gediminas Petrauskas was signed to replace Sireika. Juventus qualified for the Basketball Champions League by defeating PBC Academic 82:81 and 86:79. After this, Juventus had a horrible streak – after starting 0–7 in the LKL, coach Petrauskas resigned, and longtime player, assistant coach and team president Žydrūnas Urbonas took over as head coach. The team greatly improved, both in the LKL, and the Champions League. In the King Mindaugas Cup quarterfinals, Juventus faced BC Lietuvos rytas in a previous season rematch, losing in overtime 88:91. In the Champions League, Juventus finished the regular season with a 4–10 record, but a win against UCAM Murcia 70:56 in the last game of the regular season helped the team qualify for the 2017–18 FIBA Europe Cup playoffs. Juventus defeated Alba Fehérvár on aggregate 163:152 (87:74 at home and 76:78 away) in the Round of 16, qualifying for the quarterfinals. Juventus lost to Sidigas Avellino in the quarterfinals, on aggregate 145:162 (77:77 at home and 68:85 away). Jonte Flowers was replaced by Dino Pita during the season. By the end of the season, injuries, disciplinary issues and release of one of the team's leaders LaRon Dendy caused the team to go on a 5-game losing streak in the LKL, plummeting in the standings and finishing only in 7th place. Juventus faced Lietuvos rytas in the playoffs, losing the series 0:3, though came very close to winning the second game in Utena, losing in the final seconds after erasing an 18-point deficit.

==== 2018–2019 season ====
Martinas Geben, a LKL Most Valuable Player of the 2018–2019 LKL regular season

In the 2018–2019 season, Juventus didn't play in European competitions, because of money troubles from the previous season. Team leaders Ireland and Kupšas left the team, being replaced by Alex Hamilton and the returning Vaidas Čepukaitis. Dovis Bičkauskis, Kenny Gaines and Šikšnius remained with the team, while Urbonas remained as head coach. Martinas Geben, who Juventus loaned from BC Žalgiris, became the first player from Juventus to get an invitation for the Lithuania men's national basketball team, playing in the World Cup qualification. After a 2–5 start, Juventus also signed Marius Runkauskas and Tomas Dimša to strengthen the team. Hamilton, the team leader, left in December. Juventus recovered, and in February, the heavily improved Bičkauskis became the second player from Juventus to get an invitation to the national team. In the King Mindaugas Cup, Juventus eliminated the NKL champions BC Neptūnas-Akvaservis and BC Nevėžis in the first two rounds, before facing BC Rytas for the third straight season in the quarterfinals – this time, in a two-game series decided on aggregate. Juventus lost the controversial first match in Vilnius, 85–87, after questionable calls in the final minutes, including the ejection of head coach Urbonas. In the rematch, Juventus started poorly, but recovered and led for most of the game – before Urbonas received a technical foul with minutes left, and Rytas, led by Seeley and Bendžius, took control and won the game, 76–65, winning the series on aggregate, 163:150, and eliminating Juventus from the competition. Juventus finished with a 15–21 record in the LKL, in 6th place. Geben was named the MVP of the LKL for the regular season. Juventus faced Rytas in the LKL quarterfinals, and nearly created one of the biggest upsets in LKL history – in the first game, in Vilnius, Juventus lost, 91–93, after a last-second three-pointer by Gerben missed. In the second game, Juventus finally beat Rytas, 92–83, to tie the series at 1–1, giving Rytas their first ever loss in the quarterfinals. In the decisive game, Juventus lost, 63–84, losing the series, 1–2, but earning praise for their amazing efforts.

==== 2019–2020 season ====
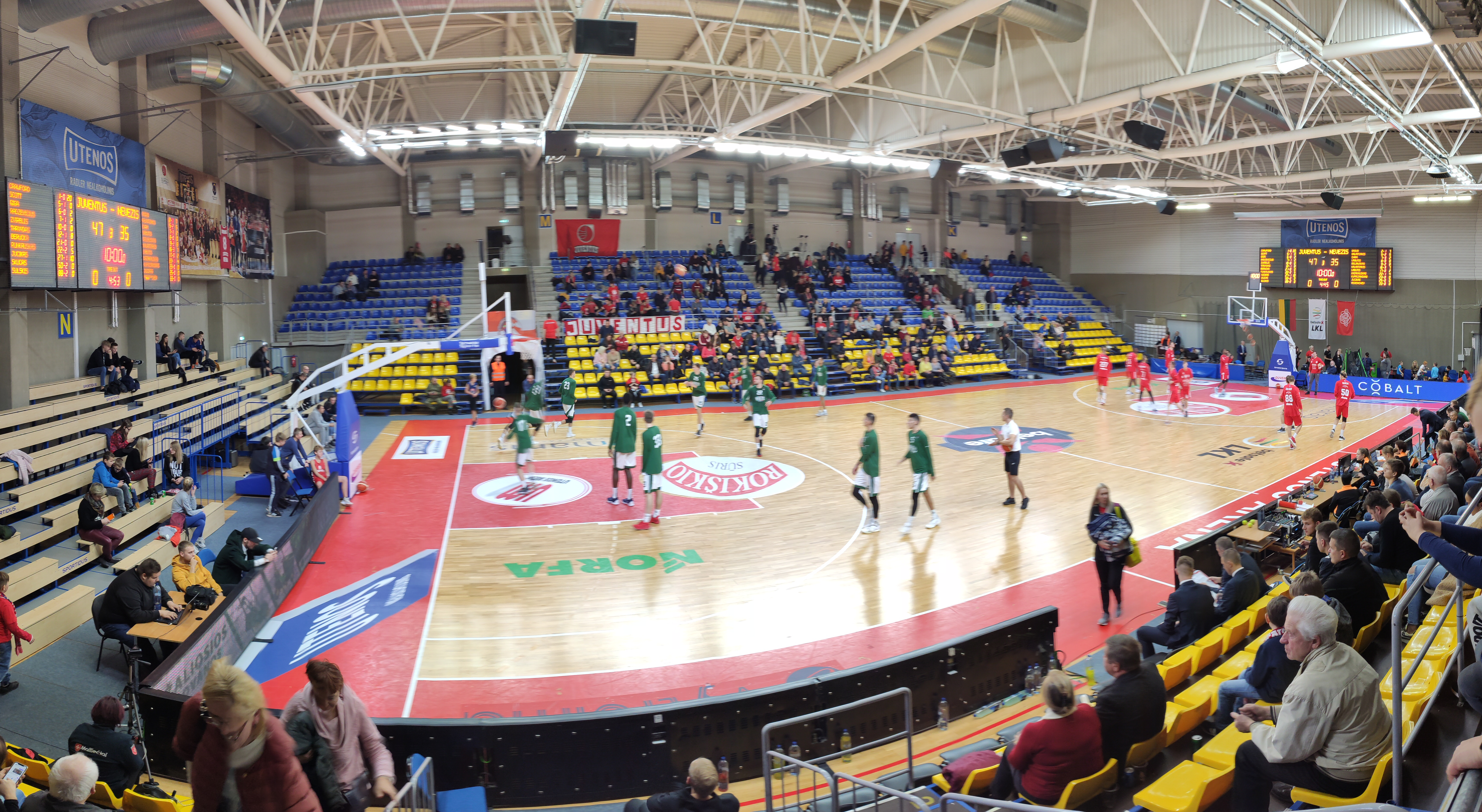
BC Juventus playing home game at Utena Arena in 2019

Celebrating their 20th anniversary, BC Juventus announced a new club logo for the upcoming 2019–20 season. The biggest losses during the summer where Martinas Geben returning to Žalgiris, Bičkauskis leaving to sign with Rytas, and Tomas Dimša leaving to sign with BC Lietkabelis. Juventus signed Julius Jucikas, Bryant Crawford, Shannon Scott, Žygimantas Skučas and the returning former LKL MVP Vytautas Šulskis to strengthen the team. During the season, Juventus continued their war with Rytas Vilnius, once again facing Rytas in the King Mindaugas Cup – after winning their first match at home 85:81, Juventus lost a controversial rematch 94:103 in Vilnius, with Rytas advancing to the semifinals. In the LKL, Juventus was fighting for the 4th place in the standings against BC Neptūnas, with the strength of the new signings to the club and the improved Gytis Radzevičius, playing the best season of his career. Due to the coronavirus outbreak, the season ended early, and Juventus, one win behind Neptūnas, finished the season in 5th place. Juventus also played in the Lithuanian 3x3 championship during the summer, winning the tournament.

==== 2020–2021 season ====
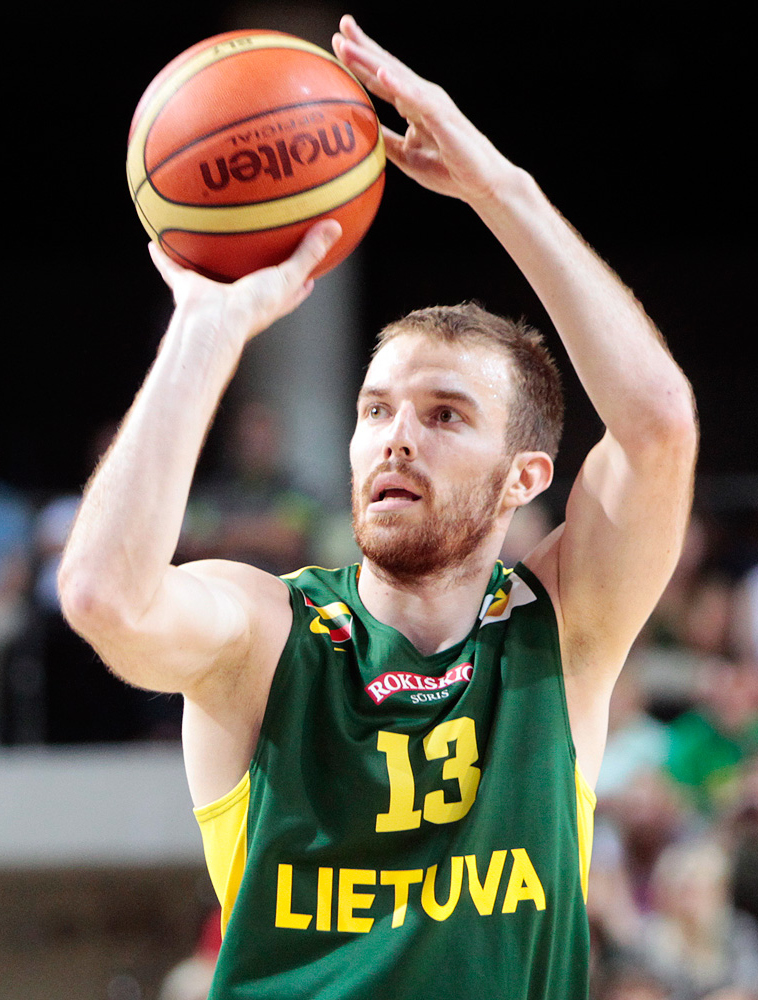
Martynas Gecevičius, two times EuroLeague champion and 2010 FIBA World Championship bronze medalist, joined Juventus in 2020 and played there until the end of the 2022–2023

Juventus quickly became one of the better teams of the LKL of the 2020–2021 season. Under coach Urbonas, and led by their 3x3 championship, in particular Skučas, winning team, Crawford, the returning Mindaugas Kupšas and former Rytas player Martynas Gecevičius, and late season signing Vaidas Kariniauskas, Juventus shocked everyone by defeating Rytas in the King Mindaugas Cup, winning both at home 89:87 and away 105:78, getting sweet revenge from the previous season's controversial losses. Juventus, having lost in the semifinals to Lietkabelis, won the KMT bronze medals by defeating BC Neptūnas. Juventus also participated in FIBA 3x3 tournaments during the season, having much success and becoming one of the best teams in the world. In the LKL, Juventus managed to reach the LKL semifinals with a win over CBet Prienai 2–0 in the quarterfinals. Juventus lost 0–3 to BC Žalgiris in the semifinals. Facing EuroCup team BC Lietkabelis in the bronze medal series, Juventus took the series to the limit, but lost the deciding game 63:84 in Panevėžys, and lost the series 2–3. Juventus finished the LKL season 4th.

==== 2021–2022 season ====
Success in the 2020–2021 season resulted in Juventus earning a bid in the 2021–22 Basketball Champions League qualification. While Juventus lost Kariniauskas and Skučas during the off-season, much of the previous season team remained. Juventus signed Tomas Lekūnas to replace Skučas. At point guard, Juventus signed Patrick Miller to replace Kariniauskas at point guard. Juventus also signed Rokas Gustys and Norbertas Giga to strengthen the team. In the Basketball Champions League qualification, Juventus managed to reach the final stage, by beating the Kapfenberg Bulls 90:68 in the quarterfinals, and multiple time German champions and past EuroLeague participant Brose Bamberg 83:79 in the semifinals, thanks to strong play from Miller. In the finals, Juventus lost to Kalev/Cramo 81:86 in the finals, not qualifying for the Basketball Champions League regular season. In the LKL, Juventus started strong, thanks to strong play from Miller, fighting for the third spot in the standings, including a memorable 111:89 win over BC Rytas in Vilnius. By the start of 2022, Juventus started struggling. Adreian Payne, the heavily hyped signing at center to replace the departed Kupšas, arrived not ready to play, had multiple conflicts with coach Urbonas and left the team in February. It would turn out to be his final team. The team started falling apart – injuries, losses in the LKL, a shock exit against BC Šiauliai in the King Mindaugas Cup quarterfinals, even some fan protests, resulted in head coach Žydrūnas Urbonas resigning in April. Juventus, left with the assistant Nedas Pacevičius at the helm, finished the LKL regular season in 6th place. In the LKL quarterfinals, Juventus faced and lost to BC Lietkabelis, who swept Juventus 3:0 in the series, an anti-climatic end to the season.

==== 2022–2023 season ====
Jon Davis, one of Juventus leaders in 2023

Juventus had a turbulent summer – nearly the entire team left during the summer. Juventus signed ex-Rytas coach Donaldas Kairys as the new head coach for the season. Much of the new signings came weeks before the new season was set to start – Juventus signed back Skučas, returning after a one-season absence, and signed back Alex Hamilton, who had a brief tenure with the team in the 2018–2019 season. Other signings included Juwan Ewans, Justin Alston, who, along with Hamilton, quickly became leaders of the new team. Juventus started the season slow, with a 0–3 start in the LKL, before winning the next 11 out of 12 games, and reaching as far the third place in the LKL standings. Juventus also signed Reggie Lynch as the center later during the season, forming a formidable front-court with Alston. Martynas Paliukėnas also had his best season with Juventus in the LKL. The biggest win in the LKL came in February, with Juventus beating LKL champions BC Rytas in Vilnius, 88:77, in Kairys first match back in Vilnius, where he was heavily jeered all game by Rytas fans. Ewans and Hamilton later left the team during the season, and were replaced by Brandon Brown and Jon Davis, with Davis in particular quickly adapting and becoming the team leader. Juventus participated in the King Mindaugas Cup, losing to BC Lietkabelis in the quarterfinals. In the LKL, Juventus finished the regular season in 6th place, and in the quarterfinals, once again faced Lietkabelis. Lietkabelis beat Juventus in the first game, 85:73, in Panevėžys, before Juventus fought back and beat Lietkabelis in Utena, 86:77, tying the series. The third and decisive game proved to be a classic – Juventus fought and led most of the way, before Lietkabelis regained the lead, and in the final minutes, pulled out a 101:99 win over Juventus, winning the series 2:1. Immediately after the season, long time coach and team president Urbonas left the team. Gintautas Matulis took over as the new sporting director in the club, starting a new era for the team.

==== 2023–2024 season ====
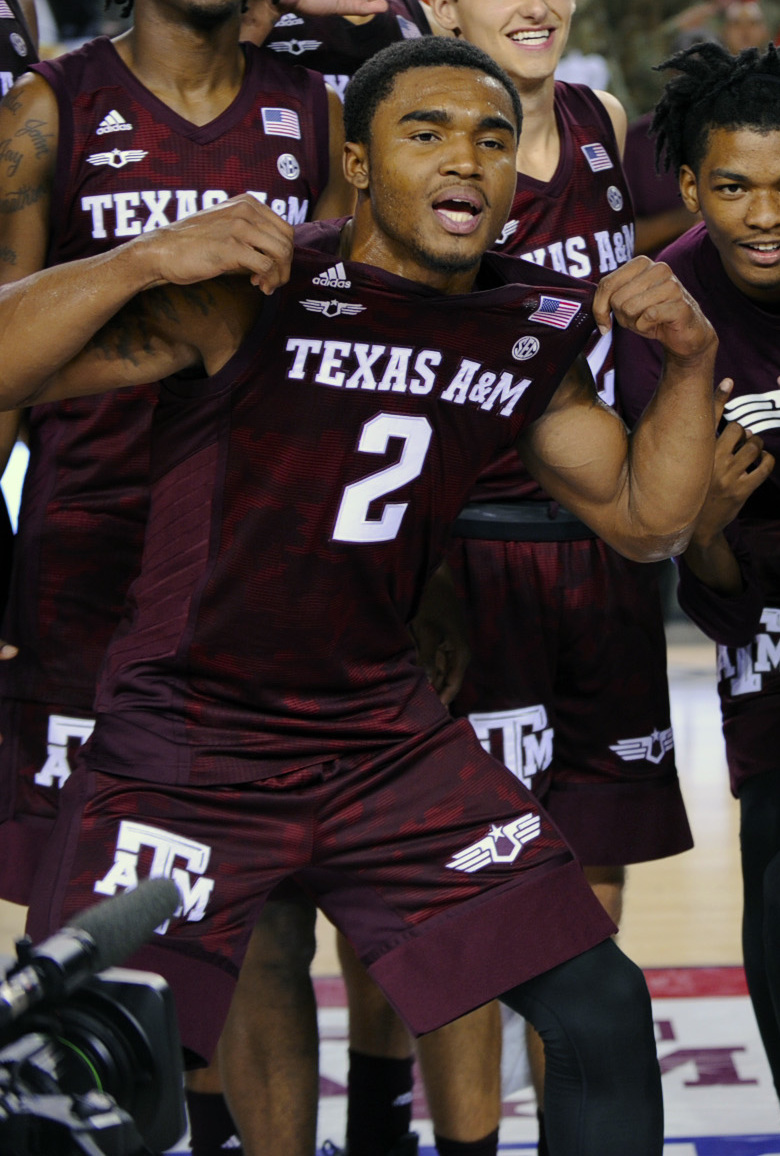
TJ Starks, a late season addition who became Juventus leader in 2024

Juventus replaced Kairys with Oliver Kostić, a former assistant coach in BC Žalgiris and at the time the assistant coach in the Serbia national basketball team, during the summer, and only Skučas and Ernestas Sederevičius remaining with Juventus from the previous team. For the first half of the season, Juventus was led by Brae Ivey, who departed Juventus in December. Signings like point guard Scoochie Smith, the front court of Ajdin Penava and Ivan Vraneš led the team in scoring. Late season signing TJ Starks in particular sparked the team, quickly becoming the new team leader in the absence of Ivey, while Evaldas Šaulys, Marius Valinskas and center Šarūnas Beniušis, along with Skučas and Sederevičius, also noteworthy contributed to victories. Juventus returned to European competitions, participating in the 2023–24 European North Basketball League. For most of the season, Juventus remained strong – Juventus had dominated the King Mindaugas Cup group stage, with a 4–2 record, and also beating BC Nevėžis in the play-in, with a 107:90 win in Kėdainiai, losing at home 101:113 but winning on aggregate, to advance to the quarterfinals – in the quarterfinals, Juventus faced off long time rivals, BC Rytas – Rytas took a big win over Juventus in Utena, 98:86, and finished off Juventus with a 104:67 win in Vilnius. In the European North Basketball League, Juventus had dominated the group stage, advancing to the playoffs with a 6–1 record, and heavy favorites against Belgian club Royal Liege Basket – who had been easily beaten in by other Lithuanian club, BC Šiauliai, now coached by former Juventus president and coach Žydrūnas Urbonas. Juventus had been considered to win the whole tournament, suffered a stunner when Liege went on to win the first game 95:84 at home. In the rematch, Juventus went on to win 96:87, however, with the win not being enough, as Liege shockingly eliminated Juventus from the competition. Meanwhile BC Šiauliai, along with Urbonas, went on to advance to the competition's semifinals. In the LKL, however, Juventus had shined all season long – winning the season series against 7-Bet Lietkabelis and a sweet win in Utena in May over Rytas helped Juventus get home-court advantage for the first time for the LKL playoffs since 2021, with an 18–12 record and 4th place in the standings – one of the best finishes ever for Juventus. Coach Kostić was named the LKL Coach of the Year for the season. The home-court advantage, however, proved to be irrelevant as Juventus faced off Lietkabelis again in the quarterfinals. Juventus lost the opening thriller in Utena, as Lietkabelis won 84:77, before beating Lietkabelis in Panevėžys, 89:88, as the series was tied at 1:1 heading in the deciding clash in Utena. Lietkabelis led nearly the entire game, before Juventus made a mircale comeback and erased a deficit to force overtime. In overtime, both teams traded shots, before a shot by Smith put Juventus up by 1 in closing seconds. Lietkabelis, however, made their move and a tip-in by Gabrielius Maldūnas gave Lietkabelis a 100:99 lead, followed by a costly turnover by Juventus – Lietkabelis won the series 2:1. Juventus fans gave the team a standing ovation after the game, for a great season.

==== 2024–2025 season ====
Laurynas Beliauskas (pictured) and Sukhmail Mathon were the most efficient players of Juventus in the 2024–2025 LKL

Matulis left the position as the team's sporting director during the off-season, having chosen to renew his playing career in the National Basketball League. Assistant coach Vytautas Buzas took over as the new sporting director, as well as replacing Kostić as the team's new head coach. Juventus also rebuilt the team, as Smith, Penava, Vraneš, Starks, Valinskas, Šaulys, all key players and team leaders, departed Juventus. Juventus signed former Lietkabelis leader Gediminas Orelik, as well as long time Žalgiris player Karolis Lukošiūnas, Laurynas Beliauskas, Justinas Ramanauskas, Joe Chealey, Dominic Green, former Šiauliai leader L.J. Thorpe, Ian Miller and Puerto Rico national team center Arnaldo Toro were signed to contracts, while Beniušis, Skučas and Sederevičius remained with Juventus, with experts calling the new Juventus team as the strongest in club history. In the 2024-25 Basketball Champions League qualification, Juventus beat KK Spartak Subotica 87:84 in the first round, but were defeated by Italian side Dinamo Sassari, who won the game 77:73, to eliminate Juventus from the competition. In the LKL, Juventus started the season with a 3-5 record, a massive disappointment for the team. Juventus was also surprisingly eliminated in the King Mindaugas Cup group stage, unable to reach the playoffs for the first time in competition's history. Many changes were made as Juventus released Miller and Chealey from contracts, Orelik departed from Juventus to play in the EuroCup Basketball competition, and Kęstutis Kemzūra, former Lithuanian national team long time coach, replacing Buzas as the new head coach for Juventus – with Buzas returning to his old position as assistant coach. While under Kemzūra, the play started to improve – while Juventus still at times struggled, in particular a 61 point home loss to Žalgiris Kaunas in the final game of 2024, Juventus also had win streaks, and also had wins over rivals and EuroCup playoff contenders 7-Bet Lietkabelis and Wolves-Twinsbet. Green and Beliauskas became the new team leaders, with strong games from late additions point guard Tookie Brown and center Sukhmail Mathon (replacement for the released Toro). Juventus also underwent much roster changes, with many players also underperforming (in particular Lukošiūnas), as well as changes in management – with Rolandas Jarutis, former Rytas director, taking over as the new director for Juventus. Under coach Kemzūra, Juventus finished the regular season in 6th place – while a much better result than what Juventus was showing before Kemzūra's hiring, but still disappointing given the big hype pre-season. In the 2025 LKL Playoffs, Juventus faced Lietkabelis once again – while competitive games, Lietkabelis beat Juventus in Panevėžys, 83:77, and in Utena, 93:90, to again eliminate Juventus from the LKL Playoffs with a 2:0 series win, ending a rather lackluster season for Juventus.

==== 2025–2026: The Miracle Juventus season ====
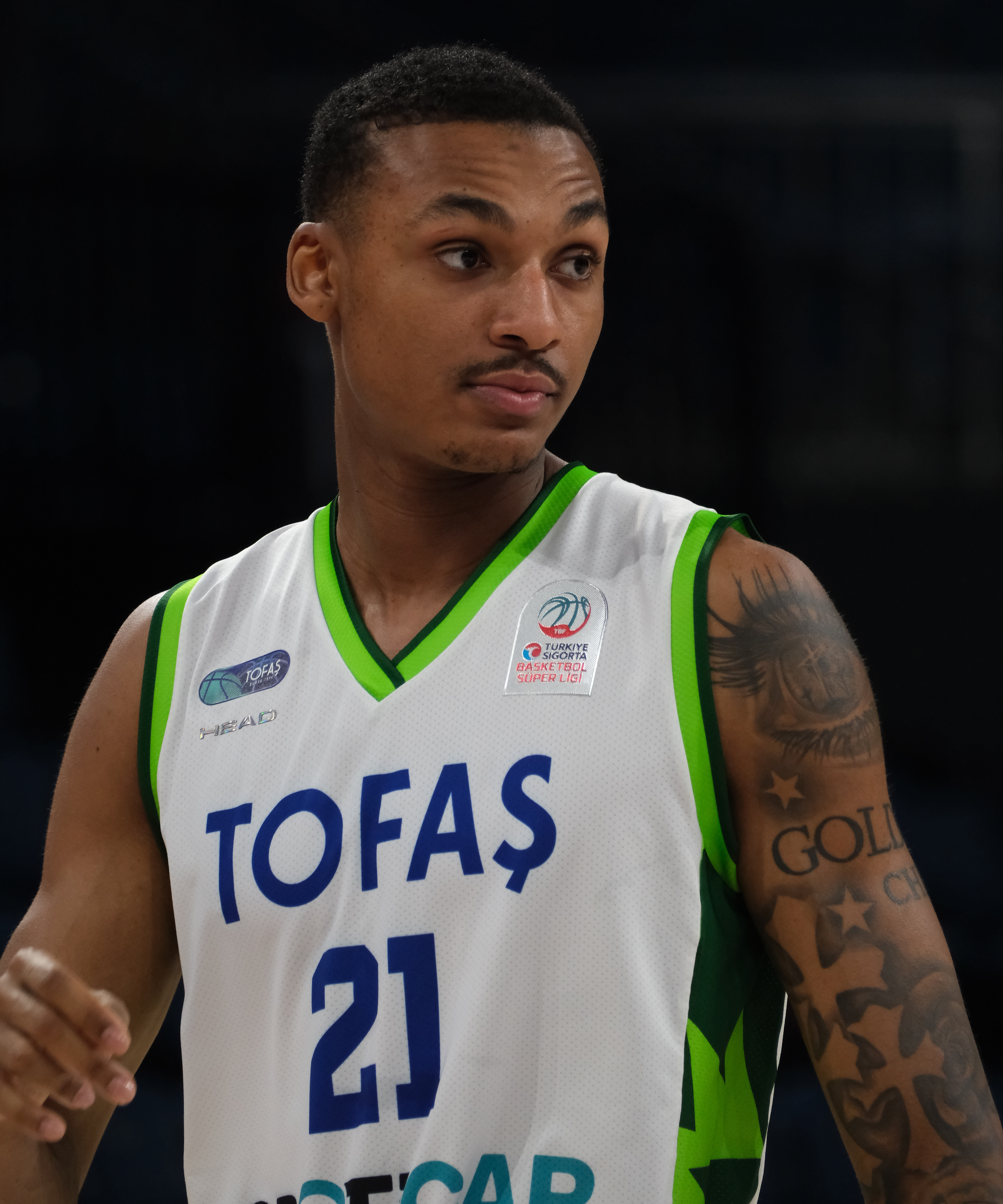
Maxwell Lewis, leader of Juventus in the historic 2025–2026 season

Kemzūra remained with Juventus during the summer. Juventus changed up much of the roster, as the budget had decreased after the disappointing previous season, with the biggest signings during the summer being former Rytas and Žalgiris players Lukas Uleckas and Paulius Valinskas, Erikas Venskus, coming of a career-season with BC Jonava, and shooting guard Devon Daniels, who quickly established himself as the new leader during his time with Juventus. Ivan Vraneš returned to Juventus to strengthen the front court. Juventus once again participated in the qualification for the Basketball Champions League, beating Karhu Kauhajoki 103:89 in the first round, but losing to UCAM Murcia in the second round, with Murcia winning 81:71. Juventus declined to participate in the FIBA Europe Cup. In the LKL, Juventus started 0-3, but by January, had climbed back up as high up as fourth in the standings. Juventus also had a much better showing in the King Mindaugas Cup, qualifying, but losing to familiar foe Lietkabelis Panevėžys (76:73 at home, 68:81 away, on aggregate). By February-April, Juventus collapsed - a club record 11 game losing streak resulted in a rift inside the team between Kemzūra and his players, most notably point guard Malik Johnson, resulted in Kemzūra resigning. Searching for a new coach, Juventus signed Laimonas Eglinskas, a long time assistant for Lietkabelis, and most recently, the head coach for the similarly struggling BC Nevėžis. The move was largely panned by many experts and fans, with questions raised if Juventus can even qualify for the LKL playoffs in the remaining games. Juventus defied the expectations - winning four of the remaining six games, including a win over Nevėžis in the return game for Eglinskas after his acrimonious departure, Juventus qualified for the 2026 LKL Playoffs, as the 7th seed. Valinskas, Uleckas, former UConn Hassan Diarra, Maxwell Lewis - both late season additions - all whom struggled under Kemzūra, all became leaders for Juventus under Eglinskas.

In the 2026 LKL Playoffs, the comeback of Juventus became complete - just a month after barely struggling to a playoff position, Juventus upset the Basketball Champions winners Rytas Vilnius 2:0 (92:84 home and 101:95 away) in the quarterfinals, in the biggest shocker ever in LKL history, and beat Neptūnas Klaipėda, a EuroCup playoff contender, 3:1 (96:83 away, 87:83 at home, 84:102 away and 103:90 at home) - winning both series without any home-court advantage, and qualifying for the LKL Finals for the first time in club history. The miracle team broke numerous attendance records in the Utena Arena. In the LKL Finals, Juventus faced Žalgiris Kaunas - Žalgiris had dominated the LKL to the point the series was considered a mere formality. Juventus was no match for Žalgiris - Žalgiris won 3:0 (107:75 away, 100:69 home and 95:77 away) to win the LKL championship for the second consecutive year. Despite losing, it was Juventus who returned to Utena as heroes, greeted by thousands of fans. The miracle run of Juventus during the LKL playoffs also helped Juventus qualify for the 2026-27 Basketball Champions League group phase - Juventus finally returning to the competition for the first time since 2018. Lewis, Diarra, Valinskas and Uleckas all had career-best years with Juventus.

== Players ==
External videos
- Official Juventus basketball club anthem

=== Retired numbers ===
Juventus Utena retired numbers
No.	Nat.	Player	Position	Tenure	Ceremony Date
8	(Lithuania)	Žydrūnas Urbonas	SF, PF	2009–2012	29 September 2012

=== Current roster ===
Juventus Utena roster
Players
Coaches

Pos.	No.	Nat.	Name	Ht.	Wt.	Age
G	2	(Lithuania)	Juršys, Normantas	1.90 m (6 ft 3 in)	85 kg (187 lb)	18 – 20 June 2008
G	3	(United States)	Hunter, Chase	1.93 m (6 ft 4 in)	92 kg (203 lb)	25 – 8 April 2001
F	4	(Lithuania)	Furmanavičius, Justas (injured)	1.97 m (6 ft 6 in)	94 kg (207 lb)	32 – 14 September 1994
F	5	(United States)	Jones, Tevian	2.01 m (6 ft 7 in)	100 kg (220 lb)	26 – 29 June 2000
F	6	(Lithuania)	Matulis, Gintautas	1.97 m (6 ft 6 in)	94 kg (207 lb)	40 – 6 October 1986
F	7	(Lithuania)	Slavinskas, Džiugas	2.02 m (6 ft 8 in)	97 kg (214 lb)	27 – 11 November 1998
G	9	(Lithuania)	Beliauskas, Laurynas	1.92 m (6 ft 4 in)	84 kg (185 lb)	29 – 2 March 1997
PG	10	(United States)	Pagenkopf, Jack	1.90 m (6 ft 3 in)	86 kg (190 lb)	29 – 22 July 1997
F/C	11	(Sweden)	Pohto, Kenny	2.09 m (6 ft 10 in)	105 kg (231 lb)	24 – 18 July 2002
C	14	(Lithuania)	Beniušis, Šarūnas (C)	2.06 m (6 ft 9 in)	108 kg (238 lb)	33 – 16 April 1993
F/C	15	(Netherlands)	Nzekwesi, Emmanuel	2.03 m (6 ft 8 in)	109 kg (240 lb)	29 – 5 September 1997
F	23	(United States)	Reynolds, Cameron (injured)	2.03 m (6 ft 8 in)	102 kg (225 lb)	31 – 7 February 1995
G	66	(Lithuania)	Valinskas, Paulius (injured)	1.91 m (6 ft 3 in)	85 kg (187 lb)	30 – 9 December 1995

Head coach

- (Lithuania) Laimonas Eglinskas

Assistant coach(es)

- (Lithuania) Paulius Juodis
- (Lithuania) Ugnius Nikitinas

Athletic trainer(s)

- (Lithuania) Mindaugas Saulevičius

Physiotherapist(s)

- (Lithuania) Aurimas Tilindis

Team manager

- (Lithuania) Eimantas Skersis

Legend

- (C) Team captain
- Injured

- Roster
Updated: 2 November 2026

=== Depth chart ===
Pos.	Starting 5	Bench	Inactive
C	Šarūnas Beniušis	Emmanuel Nzekwesi
PF	Kenny Pohto	Gintautas Matulis	Cameron Reynolds (injured)
SF	Tevian Jones	Džiugas Slavinskas	Justas Furmanavičius (injured)
SG	Laurynas Beliauskas	Normantas Juršys	Paulius Valinskas (injured)
PG	Jack Pagenkopf	Chase Hunter

=== Squad changes for/during the 2026–27 season ===
==== In ====
No.	Pos.	Nat.	Name	Moving from	
1	F/C	(United States)	Brandon Huntley-Hatfield	Keravnos B.C.	(Greece)
2	G	(Lithuania)	Normantas Juršys	Vilniaus Krepšinio Mokykla	(Lithuania)
3	G	(United States)	Chase Hunter	Birmingham Squadron	(United States)
4	F	(Lithuania)	Justas Furmanavičius	Lietkabelis Panevėžys	(Lithuania)
5	F	(United States)	Tevian Jones	Brampton Honey Badgers	(Canada)
6	F	(Lithuania)	Gintautas Matulis	Jurbarkas-Karys	(Lithuania)
7	F	(Lithuania)	Džiugas Slavinskas	Free agent	
9	G	(Lithuania)	Laurynas Beliauskas	Dinamo Sassari	(Italy)
10	PG	(United States)	Jack Pagenkopf	Science City Jena	(Germany)
11	F/C	(Sweden)	Kenny Pohto	Nevėžis Kėdainiai	(Lithuania)
15	F/C	(Netherlands)	Emmanuel Nzekwesi	CSM Oradea	(Romania)
23	F	(United States)	Cameron Reynolds	Maroussi	(Greece)

==== Out ====
No.	Pos.	Nat.	Name	Moving to	
0	G	(United States)	Kenny Chery	Free agent	
1	PG	(United States)	Malik Johnson	Rilski Sportist	(Bulgaria)
1	F/C	(United States)	Brandon Huntley-Hatfield	Free agent	
5	G/F	(Lithuania)	Evaldas Šaulys	BC Gargždai	(Lithuania)
6	PG	(Lithuania)	Titas Didžgalvis	Free agent	
10	F	(Lithuania)	Lukas Uleckas	Básquet Coruña	(Spain)
11	G	(United States)	Hassan Diarra	Iraklis Thessaloniki	(Greece)
13	C	(Croatia)	Ivan Vraneš	Free agent	
21	F/C	(Lithuania)	Erikas Venskus	BC Šiauliai	(Lithuania)
22	F	(United States)	Maxwell Lewis	Žalgiris Kaunas	(Lithuania)
23	G/F	(Lithuania)	Mintautas Mockus	CBet Jonava	(Lithuania)

== Honours ==
Utena Arena, where BC Juventus plays its home games since 2009

=== Domestic competitions ===
- LKBL

Winners (1): 2005

- RKL

Winners (1): 2007

- Lithuanian Basketball League

2nd place (1): 2026
3rd place (1): 2015

- King Mindaugas Cup

3rd place (2): 2017, 2021

=== Regional competitions ===
- BBL Challenge Cup

Winners (1): 2011

== Season by season ==
Season	Tier	League	Pos.	Baltic League	Pos.	LKF Cup / King Mindaugas Cup	European competitions	
2003–04	3	LKBL	6th					
2004–05	3	LKBL	1st					
2005–06	3	RKL	3rd					
2006–07	3	RKL	1st					
2007–08	2	NKL	4th					
2008–09	2	NKL	4th			Fourth round		
2009–10	1	LKL	4th	Challenge Cup	5th	First round		
2010–11	1	LKL	4th	Challenge Cup	1st	Second round		
2011–12	1	LKL	9th	Elite Division	11th	Second round		
2012–13	1	LKL	7th	Elite Division	9th	Second round		
2013–14	1	LKL	7th	Elite Division	13th	Second round		
2014–15	1	LKL	3rd	Elite Division	3rd	Fourth place		
2015–16	1	LKL	4th			Quarterfinalist	3 FIBA Europe Cup	R16
2016–17	1	LKL	5th			Third place	3 Champions League	POQ
2017–18	1	LKL	7th			Quarterfinalist	3 Champions League	RS
2017–18	1	LKL	7th			Quarterfinalist	4 FIBA Europe Cup	QF
2018–19	1	LKL	6th			Quarterfinalist		
2019–20	1	LKL	5th			Quarterfinalist		
2020–21	1	LKL	4th			Third place		
2021–22	1	LKL	6th			Quarterfinalist	3 Champions League	QR
2022–23	1	LKL	6th			Quarterfinalist		
2023–24	1	LKL	5th	ENBL	QF	Quarterfinalist		
2024–25	1	LKL	6th			Group stage	3 Champions League	QR
2025–26	1	LKL	2nd			Quarterfinals	3 Champions League	QR

Detailed information of former rosters and results.

== Logos ==
Juventus logo (1999–2004, 2009–2019)

Juventus LKSK (2004–2009)

Anniversary logo (2019–2021)

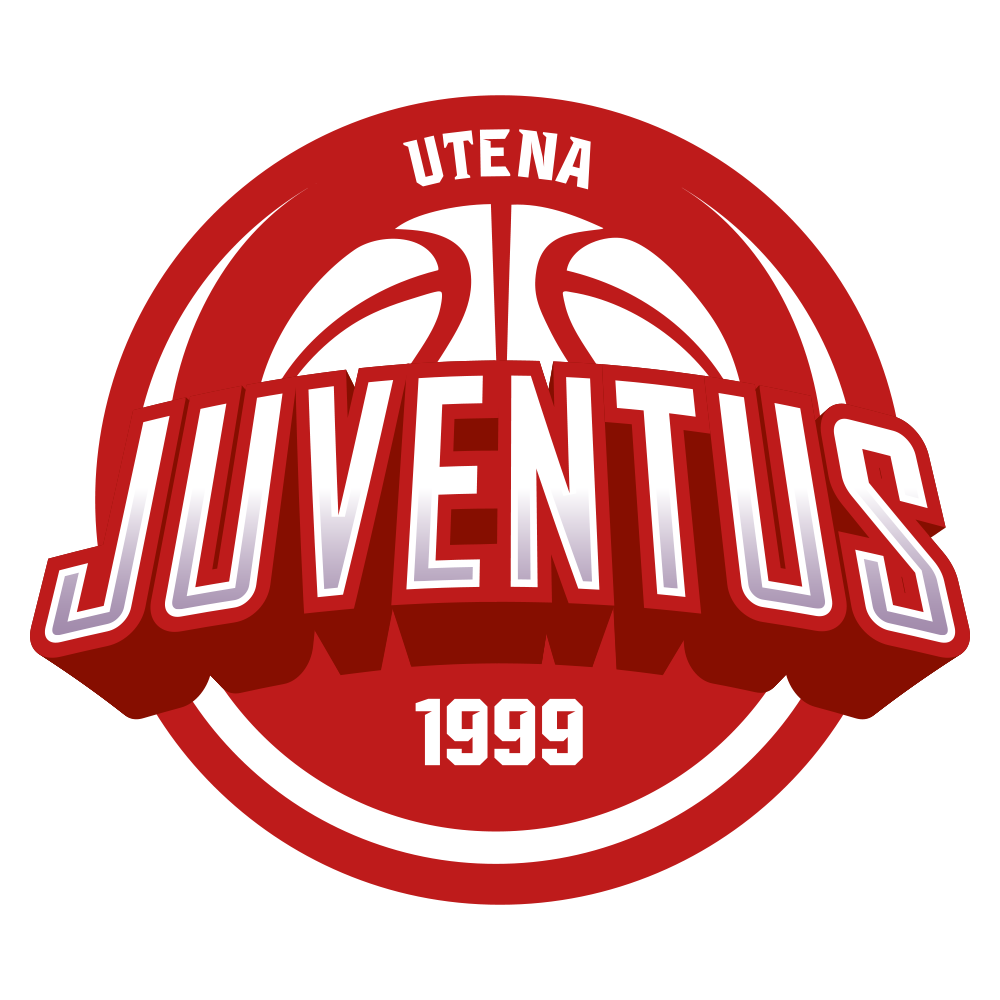
Current Juventus logo (2025–present)

== Club name changes ==
- 1999–2004: Utenos Juventus
- 2004–2009: Utenos Juventus LKSK (Lithuanian: Lietuvos kariuomenės sporto klubas, English: Lithuania military sports club)
- 2009–2021: Utenos Juventus
- 2021–2024: Uniclub Casino Juventus
- 2024–2025: Uniclub Bet Juventus
- 2025–present: Utenos Juventus

== Head coaches ==
- (Lithuania) Gintaras Kručkauskas (2009–2010)
- (Lithuania) Robertas Giedraitis (2010–2012)
- (Lithuania) Rytis Vaišvila (2012–2013)
- (Lithuania) Vitoldas Masalskis (2013)
- (Lithuania) Virginijus Sirvydis (2013–2014)
- (Lithuania) Dainius Adomaitis (2014–2015)
- (Lithuania) Antanas Sireika (2015–2017)
- (Lithuania) Gediminas Petrauskas (2017)
- (Lithuania) Žydrūnas Urbonas (2017–2022)
- (Lithuania) Nedas Pacevičius (interim) (2022)
- (Lithuania) Donaldas Kairys (2022–2023)
- (Serbia) Oliver Kostić (2023–2024)
- (Lithuania) Vytautas Buzas (2024)
- (Lithuania) Kęstutis Kemzūra (2024–2026)
- (Lithuania) Laimonas Eglinskas (2026–present)

== Notable players ==
- (Lithuania) Virginijus Praškevičius (2009–2010)
- (Lithuania) Aurimas Kieža (2010–2011)
- (Lithuania) Marius Prekevičius (2010–2011)
- (Lithuania) Žydrūnas Urbonas (2009–2012)
- (Nigeria) Ejike Ugboaja (2013)
- (United States) Jeremy Hazell (2013–2014)
- (United States) Rashaun Broadus (2014–2015)
- (Lithuania) Ovidijus Galdikas (2016–2017)
- (Lithuania) Dainius Šalenga (2016–2017)
- (United States) Jamar Diggs (2016–2017)
- (United States) Spencer Butterfield (2016–2017)
- (Finland) Carl Lindbom (2017)
- (Lithuania) Dovis Bičkauskis (2016–2019)
- (Lithuania) Gytis Radzevičius (2018–2020)
- (Lithuania) Tomas Dimša (2018–2019)
- (Lithuania) Martinas Geben (2018–2019)
- (Lithuania) Norbertas Giga (2019–2020)
- (United States) Jamel Artis (2020)
- (Lithuania) Marius Runkauskas (2018–2021)
- (Lithuania) Žygimantas Skučas (2019–2021, 2022–2025)
- (United States) Alex Hamilton: (2018–2019,2022-2023)
- (United States) Patrick Miller (2021–2022)
- (Lithuania) Vytautas Šulskis (2016–2017, 2019–2022)
- (Lithuania) Mindaugas Kupšas (2017–2018, 2020–2021)
- (Lithuania) Martynas Gecevičius (2020–2023)
- (United States) Bryant Crawford (2019–2021)
- (United States) Adreian Payne (2021–2022)
- (Lithuania) Rokas Gustys (2021–2022)
- (Lithuania) Tomas Delininkaitis (2021–2022)
- (United States) Jawun Evans (2022)
- (United States) Reggie Lynch (2023)

== Mascot ==
The official mascot of BC Juventus is named Juvis. Introduced in 2012, Juvis is a red cartoon devil wearing blue sneakers, who usually carries a golden trident. It bears resemblance to BSD Daemon, an operating system mascot.
