= 2016–17 LKL season =

Tete-a-Tete Casino-LKL
- Season: 2016–17
- Duration: 21 September 2016 – 9 June 2017
- Games played: 220 (regular season)
- Teams: 10

Regular season
- Season MVP: (United States) Jamar Diggs (Juventus)

Finals
- Champions: Žalgiris (19th title)
- Runners-up: Lietkabelis
- Third place: Lietuvos rytas
- Fourth place: Neptūnas
- Finals MVP: (Lithuania) Edgaras Ulanovas (Žalgiris)

Statistical leaders
Points	(Poland) David Logan	15.6
Rebounds	(Lithuania) Julius Kazakauskas	7.8
Assists	(Croatia) Toni Prostran	7.0

Records
- Average attendance: 2,286

The 2016–17 Lietuvos krepšinio lyga was the 24th season of the top-tier level professional basketball league of Lithuania, the Lietuvos krepšinio lyga (LKL). The season started on 21 September 2016, and ended on 9 June 2017.

Žalgiris was the defending champion, and successfully defended its title. The title was the seventh consecutive championship for Žalgiris.

== Competition format ==
During the regular season, all teams played 36 games. The top eight teams, after playing 36 games each, joined the playoffs, in the quarterfinals, that was played in a best-of-three games format. The semifinals were also played in that format.

The final round was played between the two winners of the semifinals. The final series for the first place was played in a best-of-seven format, while the series for the third place was played in a best-of-five format.

== Teams ==
Location of teams in 2016–17 LKL

Team	Location	Arena	Capacity
Dzūkija	Alytus	Alytus Arena	5,500
Juventus	Utena	Utena Arena	2,000
Lietkabelis	Panevėžys	Cido Arena	7,000
Lietuvos rytas	Vilnius	Lietuvos rytas Arena Siemens Arena	2,500 11,000
Neptūnas	Klaipėda	Švyturys Arena	6,500
Nevėžis	Kėdainiai	Kėdainiai Arena	2,200
Pieno žvaigždės	Pasvalys	Pieno žvaigždės Arena	1,500
Šiauliai	Šiauliai	Šiauliai Arena	5,900
Vytautas	Prienai-Birštonas	Prienai Arena	1,500
Žalgiris	Kaunas	Žalgiris Arena	15,500

== Regular season ==
In the regular season, teams played against each other four times, home-and-away, in double a round-robin format. The six first qualified teams advanced to the playoffs. The regular season started on 21 September 2016.

=== Table ===
Pos	Team	Pld	W	L	PF	PA	PD	Qualification
1	Žalgiris	36	33	3	3033	2424	+609	Advance to Play-offs
2	Lietuvos rytas	36	26	10	2951	2622	+329	Advance to Play-offs
3	Lietkabelis	36	25	11	2904	2728	+176	Advance to Play-offs
4	Neptūnas	36	21	15	2790	2623	+167	Advance to Play-offs
5	Juventus	36	19	17	2941	2915	+26	Advance to Play-offs
6	Vytautas	36	18	18	2782	2735	+47	Advance to Play-offs
7	Pieno žvaigždės	36	15	21	2810	2898	−88	Advance to Play-offs
8	Dzūkija	36	10	26	2471	2769	−298	Advance to Play-offs
9	Nevėžis	36	7	29	2664	2994	−330	
10	Šiauliai	36	6	30	2551	3189	−638	

Source: LKL

=== Results ===
==== Rounds 1 and 2 ====
Home \ Away	DZŪ	JUV	LTK	LRY	NEP	NEV	PŽV	ŠIA	VYT	ŽAL
Dzūkija		75–73	67–87	59–79	56–80	66–63	52–67	94–64	49–68	61–94
Juventus	77–62		76–85	81–74	91–97	81–72	97–92	98–79	73–76	66–90
Lietkabelis	94–77	77–84		93–85	93–74	85–81	69–88	75–62	71–66	90–86
Lietuvos rytas	73–62	98–81	68–66		78–75	89–70	94–57	83–74	77–53	66–74
Neptūnas	64–58	75–60	67–77	79–78		70–63	55–61	95–67	76–79	67–95
Nevėžis	82–85	88–74	79–86	68–81	94–90		77–73	81–74	80–68	68–81
Pieno žvaigždės	79–72	91–95	70–72	68–86	70–67	92–72		71–59	75–70	82–86
Šiauliai	78–82	65–76	66–101	60–104	62–110	99–92	85–84		60–97	45–98
Vytautas	79–58	89–84	75–85	79–83	74–67	83–69	96–77	109–57		55–63
Žalgiris	79–64	90–70	76–65	84–68	77–67	89–62	98–84	98–82	79–66	

Legend: Blue = home team win; Red = away team win.

==== Rounds 3 and 4 ====
Home \ Away	DZŪ	JUV	LTK	LRY	NEP	NEV	PŽV	ŠIA	VYT	ŽAL
Dzūkija		74–76	89–80	73–78	66–69	83–73	82–92	69–51	79–65	64–79
Juventus	87–66		74–72	85–87	83–98	98–79	91–97	81–67	81–75	71–73
Lietkabelis	70–62	94–90		86–77	74–61	100–69	90–59	80–85	63–69	79–77
Lietuvos rytas	76–72	75–76	92–60		82–62	86–78	93–86	87–63	109–60	72–79
Neptūnas	69–60	70–79	86–61	85–78		90–53	59–54	85–78	72–60	77–81
Nevėžis	70–79	74–102	71–95	56–92	70–72		90–94	86–56	87–96	54–82
Pieno žvaigždės	82–53	76–81	76–84	79–88	81–93	89–88		85–74	92–89	56–63
Šiauliai	85–64	78–86	78–98	81–82	65–100	84–74	98–87		94–100	71–93
Vytautas	91–69	95–87	82–85	68–73	96–89	56–72	86–74	83–61		70–81
Žalgiris	96–68	90–76	84–62	90–60	69–78	80–59	94–70	101–50	84–59	

Legend: Blue = home team win; Red = away team win.

== Playoffs ==
Quarter-finals
1 Žalgiris	80	87	96
8 Dzūkija	73	74	40
4 Neptūnas	93	78	87
5 Juventus	75	57	69
2 Lietuvos rytas	106	89	107
7 Pieno žvaigždės	73	80	51
3 Lietkabelis	77	84	83
6 Vytautas	75	71	67

Semi-finals
1 Žalgiris	83	70	83	69
4 Neptūnas	54	73	60	53
2 Lietuvos rytas	96	73	73	77
3 Lietkabelis	85	90	81	86

Final
1 Žalgiris	73	83	97	72	73
2 Lietkabelis	67	86	58	59	68

Third place
3 Lietuvos rytas	79	70	71	65	75
4 Neptūnas	60	83	54	70	66

== Attendance data ==
Attendance data included playoff games:

Pos	Team	Total	High	Low	Average	Change
1	Neptūnas	104,170	5,970	2,210	4,340	+9.6%
2	Žalgiris	100,047	11,841	1,705	4,002	+4.2%
3	Lietkabelis	89,334	7,013	1,914	3,722	+147.1%
4	Lietuvos rytas	60,081	9,930	780	2,403	−5.2%
5	Dzūkija	33,927	3,156	731	1,786	−22.8%
6	Juventus	27,481	2,216	820	1,446	+1.2%
7	Šiauliai	24,340	2,800	300	1,352	−14.1%
8	Nevėžis	15,918	1,785	450	884	−1.1%
9	Vytautas	13,394	1,500	270	715	+3.3%
10	Pieno žvaigždės	11,470	1,100	150	604	+8.4%
	League total	480,362	11,841	150	2,287	+12.7%

Updated to games played on 10 June 2017
Source: LKL

== Awards ==
=== MVP of the Month ===
Month	Player	Team	PIR	Source
2016
October	(Lithuania) Kšyštof Lavrinovič	Lietkabelis	25.3	
November	(Lithuania) Vaidas Čepukaitis	Juventus	23	
December	(United States) Derrick Low	Pieno žvaigždės	24.5	
2017
January	(Lithuania) Vytautas Šulskis	Juventus	19.5	
February	(Lithuania) Saulius Kulvietis	Vytautas	23.3	
March	(Lithuania) Vytenis Lipkevičius	Vytautas	26.3	
April	(Lithuania) Artūras Gudaitis	Lietuvos rytas	18.7	

== Clubs in European competitions ==
Team	Competition	Progress
Žalgiris	EuroLeague	10th
Lietuvos rytas	EuroCup	Top 16
Lietkabelis	EuroCup	Top 16
Neptūnas	Champions League	Round of 16
Juventus	Champions League	Round of 32
Vytautas	FIBA Europe Cup	Second round
Šiauliai	FIBA Europe Cup	Regular season

== Clubs in regional competitions ==
Team	Competition	Progress
Vytautas	Baltic Basketball League	Champion
Pieno žvaigždės	Baltic Basketball League	Finalist
Nevėžis	Baltic Basketball League	Quarterfinals
