= 2020–21 King Mindaugas Cup =

Basketball competition in Lithuania

2020–21 Karaliaus Mindaugo taurė
Tournament details
- Country: Lithuania
- City: Panevėžys
- Venue(s): Cido Arena
- Dates: 6 October 2020 – 14 February 2021
- Teams: 16
- Defending champions: Žalgiris

Final positions
- Champions: Žalgiris (4th title)
- Runners-up: Lietkabelis
- Third place: Juventus

Awards
- MVP: (France) Joffrey Lauvergne

The 2020–21 King Mindaugas Cup, also known as Citadele Karaliaus Mindaugo taurė for sponsorship purposes, was the sixth edition of the Lithuanian King Mindaugas Cup basketball competition. Žalgiris successfully defended the title after defeating Lietkabelis in the final 76–69.

== Format ==
The top four placed teams from the LKL 2019–20 season, gained an automatic bye to the 2021 Karaliaus Mindaugo taurė quarterfinals. While the six lower placed teams from the 2019–20 LKL season along with six other NKL teams, playing in first round, competing for the other four quarterfinals places.

== Draw ==
The first round draw of the 2021 Karaliaus Mindaugo taurė, was held on 23 September 2020. LKL teams were paired with the NKL teams. The drawing ceremony was held in half time of BC Žalgiris against BC Dzūkija in LKL TV studio. Brothers Kšyštof Lavrinovič and Darjuš Lavrinovič were guests who helped to draw pairs.

== Qualified teams ==
Location of teams in 2021 Karaliaus Mindaugo taurė

Team	Location	Tier
CBet Prienai	Prienai	LKL
Dzūkija	Alytus	LKL
Juventus	Utena	LKL
Lietkabelis	Panevėžys	LKL
Neptūnas	Klaipėda	LKL
Nevėžis-OPTIBET	Kėdainiai	LKL
Pieno žvaigždės	Pasvalys	LKL
Rytas	Vilnius	LKL
Šiauliai	Šiauliai	LKL
Žalgiris	Kaunas	LKL
Sūduva-Mantinga	Marijampolė	NKL
Vytis	Šakiai	NKL
Šilutė	Šilutė	NKL
Neptūnas-Akvaservis	Klaipėda	NKL
Žalgiris-2	Kaunas	NKL
CBet Jonava	Jonava	NKL

== Notable events ==
- On 12 October 2020, LKL announced that due to the confirmed coronavirus in the Neptūnas-Akvaservis the 13 October 2020 match between Neptūnas-Akvaservis and Šiauliai have been postponed.
- On 19 October 2020, the 20 October 2020 match between Neptūnas-Akvaservis and Šiauliai have been postponed one more time.
- On 20 October 2020, Juventus defeated their opponents Sūduva-Mantinga and entered King Mindaugas Cup quarter-finals.
- On 27 October 2020, due to confirmed coronavirus in NKL league team, against which Šilutė played, the match between Alytus Dzūkija and Šilutė is postponed to November 3, 2020.
- On 27 October 2020, Cbet Prienai after winning against their opponents Žalgiris-2 enters King Mindaugas Cup quarter-finals.
- On 27 October 2020 Nevėžis-OPTIBET, after winning against their opponents, enters second round of the King Mindaugas Cup.
- On 12 November 2020, after the draw ceremony of the second round of the King Mindaugas Cup, it became clear which teams would have to compete for their place in the quarterfinals.
- On 1 December 2020, Šiauliai enters the second stage of the King Mindaugas Cup after defeating their opponents Neptūnas-Akvaservis.
- On 3 December 2020, Pieno žvaigždės after defeating their opponents Nevėžis-OPTIBET, enters King Mindaugas Cup quarter–finals.
- On 6 December 2020, the draw ceremony of the King Mindaugas Cup quarter-finals took place.
- On 5 January 2021, after the victory over Alytaus Dzūkija, Šiauliai enters the King Mindaugas Cup quarter–finals.
- On 16 January 2021, Juventus Utena advance to the King Mindaugas Cup final four after a series of 2-0 against Rytas Vilnius.
- On 16 January 2021, Lietkabelis Panevėžys advance to the King Mindaugas Cup final four after a series of 2-0 against Cbet Prienai.
- On 17 January 2021, Neptūnas Klaipėda advance to the King Mindaugas Cup final four after a series of 1-1 (91–76, 77–88) against Šiauliai.
- On 18 January 2021, Žalgiris Kaunas advance to the King Mindaugas Cup final four after a series of 2–0 against Pieno žvaigždės Pasvalys.
- On 13 February 2021, Lietkabelis Panevėžys enters to the King Mindaugas Cup finals after winning the semifinals against Juventus Utena with the result 84-73. Žalgiris Kaunas also enters to the King Mindaugas Cup finals after winning the semifinals against Neptūnas Klaipėda with the result 84–72
- On 14 February 2021, Juventus Utena finishes the King Mindaugas Cup by winning against Neptūnas Klaipėda 86-69 and winning third place.
- On 14 February 2021, a three-point contest was held and the contest won Rytas player Andrew Goudelock.
- On 14 February 2021, Žalgiris Kaunas defended its King Mindaugas Cup title and became the 2021 King Mindaugas Cup champions. This is the fourth King Mindaugas Cup title of Žalgiris Kaunas.

== Round 1 ==
5–10 ranked teams from 2019 to 2020 LKL season and six 2020–21 NKL season teams faced-off each other in a home-and-away format, with the overall cumulative score determining the winner of a match. The winners advanced to the next round.

Team 1	Agg.	Team 2	1st leg	2nd leg
Juventus	163–142	Sūduva-Mantinga	74–74	89–68
Cbet Prienai	195–146	Žalgiris-2	87–84	108–62
Pieno žvaigždės	180–153	Cbet Jonava	89–77	91–76
Nevėžis-Optibet	151–137	Vytis	66–81	85–56
Šiauliai	161–152	Neptūnas-Akvaservis	82–87	79–65
Dzūkija	174–137	Šilutė	76–71	98–66

== Round 2 ==
Two highest ranked pair winners from 2019 to 2020 LKL season received bye's into Quarterfinals, while the remaining teams faced-off each other in a home-and-away format, with the overall cumulative score determining the winner of a match. The winners earned the remaining quarterfinals spots.

Team 1	Agg.	Team 2	1st leg	2nd leg
Juventus	Bye	N/A	—	—
Cbet Prienai	Bye	N/A	—	—
Pieno žvaigždės	168–128	Nevėžis-Optibet	79–57	89–71
Šiauliai	172–170	Dzūkija	71–96	101–74

== Quarterfinals ==
Top four teams from 2019–20 LKL season have received bye's to quarterfinals stage. Those teams are:

- Žalgiris
- Rytas
- Lietkabelis
- Neptūnas

All qualified teams will be drawn into pairs, where they will face-off each other in a home-and-away format, with the overall cumulative score determining the winner of a match. The winners of each pair would then qualify for the Final four.

Team 1	Agg.	Team 2	1st leg	2nd leg
Žalgiris	201–159	Pieno žvaigždės	98–82	103–77
Neptūnas	168–164	Šiauliai	91–76	77–88
Rytas	165–194	Juventus	87–89	78–105
Lietkabelis	183–158	Cbet Prienai	87–68	96–90

== Final four ==
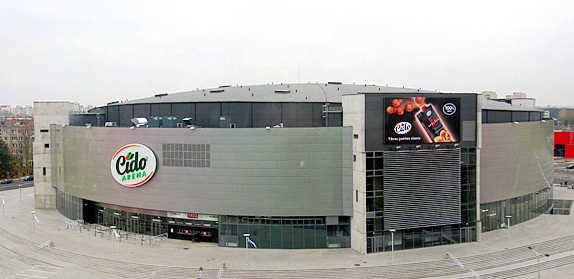
Cido Arena in Panevėžys, Lithuania

The final four was hosted by the Cido Arena in Panevėžys on 13–14 February 2021.

Semifinals; 13 February
Žalgiris	84
Neptūnas	72
Juventus	73
Lietkabelis	84

Final; 14 February
Žalgiris	76
Lietkabelis	69
Third place 14 February
Neptūnas	69
Juventus	86

=== Semifinals ===
13 February 2021	Žalgiris	84–72	Neptūnas	Panevėžys
16:30 (EET)	Scoring by quarter: 15–21, 23–14, 17–18, 29–19
	Pts: Lauvergne 28; Rebs: Lauvergne 10; Asts: Walkup 6 PIR: Lauvergne 32	Boxscore	Pts: Giga 16; Rebs: Giga 7 Asts: Giga 5 PIR: Giga 24	Arena: Cido Arena; Referees: Tomas Jasevičius, Gintaras Vitkauskas, Juozas Barkauskas

13 February 2021	Juventus	73–84	Lietkabelis	Panevėžys
14:00 (EET)	Scoring by quarter: 11―16, 23―30, 20―20, 19―18
	Pts: Kupšas 24; Rebs: Kupšas 6 Asts: Kariniauskas 9 PIR: Kupšas 27	Boxscore	Pts: Gagić 18; Rebs: Lipkevičius 10; Asts: Vinales 6 PIR: Maldūnas 22	Arena: Cido Arena; Referees: Jurgis Laurinavičius, Gytis Vilius, Artūras Šukys

=== Third place ===
14 February 2021	Neptūnas	69–86	Juventus	Panevėžys
14:45 (EET)	Scoring by quarter: 11―21, 22―19, 18―25, 18―21
	Pts: Slavinskas 17; Rebs: Griciūnas 11; Asts: Janavičius, Slavinskas 5 PIR: Slavinskas 23	Boxscore	Pts: Kupšas 19; Rebs: Kupšas 8 Asts: Kariniauskas 6 PIR: Kupšas 22	Arena: Cido Arena; Referees: Jurgis Laurinavičius, Gintaras Vitkauskas, Gvidas Gedvilas

=== Final ===
14 February 2021	Žalgiris	76–69	Lietkabelis	Panevėžys
17:50 (EET)	Scoring by quarter: 19―8, 18―20, 21―13, 18―28
	Pts: Walkup 18; Rebs: Jankūnas 6 Asts: Walkup 8 PIR: Walkup 26	Boxscore	Pts: Vinales 17; Rebs: Maldūnas 9 Asts: Maldūnas, Vinales 4 PIR: Maldūnas 20	Arena: Cido Arena; Referees: Gytis Vilius, Tomas Jasevičius, Artūras Šukys

2020–21 King Mindaugas Cup champions
Žalgiris
(4th title)
