= Laurynas Mikalauskas =

Lithuanian basketball player (born 1985)

Klaipėdos Neptūnas-Akvaservis
- Position: Power forward

Personal information
- Born: 2 October 1985 (age 41) Vilnius, Lithuanian SSR, Soviet Union
- Listed height: 2.05 m (6 ft 9 in)
- Listed weight: 110 kg (243 lb)

Career information
- High school: Blue Ridge School (Saint George, Virginia)
- College: Virginia (2005–2008)
- Playing career: 2008–present

Career history
- 2008–2009: Kavala
- 2010–2011: Naglis Palanga
- 2011: Nevėžis Kėdainiai
- 2011: BBC Monthey
- 2011: Naglis Palanga
- 2011–2013: Neptūnas Klaipėda
- 2013–2014: Rakvere Tarvas
- 2015: Dzūkija Alytus
- 2015–2016: R.B.C. Verviers-Pepinster
- 2016: Sūduva-Mantinga Marijampolė
- 2017–2018: Nevėžis Kėdainiai
- 2018–2020: BC Gargždai-SC
- 2020-2022: Palangos Kuršiai
- 2022-2023: BC Telšiai
- 2023-present: Klaipėdos Neptūnas-Akvaservis

Career highlights
- Lithuanian League leading scorer (2012)

Laurynas Mikalauskas (born 2 October 1985 in Palanga) is a Lithuanian professional basketball player. He plays for power forward position.

Mikalauskas played high school and college basketball in the United States, for the Blue Ridge School in Saint George, Virginia and at the University of Virginia.
