= Rytis Vaišvila =

Lithuanian basketball player and coach (born 1971)

Personal information
- Born: May 23, 1971 (age 55) Klaipėda, Lithuanian SSR, Soviet Union
- Listed height: 6 ft 6 in (1.98 m)
- Listed weight: 220 lb (100 kg)

Career information
- Playing career: 1990–2007
- Position: Shooting guard
- Coaching career: 2007–present

Career history

Playing
- 1990–1996: Atletas Kaunas
- 1996–1999: Alita Alytus
- 1999–2000: Teamware Topo Helsinki
- 2000–2002: Ural Great
- 2002–2004: Szolnoki Olaj
- 2004: BK Skonto
- 2004–2005: SPU Nitra
- 2005–2007: Kecskemét
- 2007: Puntukas Anykščiai

Coaching
- 2007–2008: Nafta-Uni-Laivitė Klaipėda
- 2008–2009: Neptūnas Klaipėda
- 2009–2010: Qianjiang Tan Tan
- 2010: Neptūnas Klaipėda
- 2012: Gargždų Bremena-Gargždai
- 2012–2013: Juventus Utena
- 2013–2017: Nafta-Uni-Akvaservis Klaipėda
- 2017–2019: Sūduva
- 2019-2023: BC Telšiai
- 2023-2024: Klaipėdos Neptūnas-Akvaservis
- 2024-2025: BC Šilutė
Medals
Representing Lithuania
Men's basketball
Summer Olympics
Bronze medal – third place	1996 Atlanta	{{{2}}}

Rytis Vaišvila (born May 23, 1971) is a retired Lithuanian basketball player and current coach. He last worked as head coach of BC Šilutė.

== National team career ==
Vaišvila was a member of the Lithuanian national team which won bronze medals at the 1996 Olympic Games.
