= 2024–25 LKL season =

32nd season of the top-tier level professional basketball league of Lithuania

Betsafe-LKL
- Season: 2024–25
- Duration: 21 September 2024 – 21 May 2025 (Regular season); 24 May 2025 – 21 June 2025 (Playoffs)
- Games played: 205
- Teams: 10

Regular season
- Season MVP: (United States) Anthony Cowan Jr.

Finals
- Champions: Žalgiris (25th title)
- Runners-up: Rytas
- Third place: 7Bet–Lietkabelis
- Fourth place: Cbet
- Finals MVP: (France) Sylvain Francisco

Statistical leaders
Points	(United States) Joseph Girard III	21
Rebounds	(Lithuania) Martynas Pacevičius	8
Assists	(Israel) Amit Ebo	8.5
Index Rating	(United States) Ed Croswell	20

Records
- Biggest home win: Cbet 116–55 M Basket-Delamode (16 April 2025)
- Biggest away win: Uniclub Bet – Juventus 67–128 Žalgiris (29 December 2024)
- Highest scoring: Rytas 118–109 Šiauliai–Casino Admiral (26 October 2024)
- Winning streak: 30 games Žalgiris
- Losing streak: 21 games M Basket-Delamode
- Highest attendance: 14,417; Žalgiris 76–69 Rytas (21 June 2025)
- Lowest attendance: 335; M Basket-Delamode 86–107 Cbet (6 May 2025)

Seasons
- ← 2023–24 2025–26 →

The 2024–25 Lietuvos krepšinio lyga season, also called Betsafe–LKL for sponsorship reasons, was the 32nd season of the top-tier level professional basketball league of Lithuania, the Lietuvos krepšinio lyga (LKL). Rytas were defending champions, however, they finished as a runners-up, losing finals series to eventual champions Žalgiris, who won their 25th champioship.

== Teams ==
10 teams participated in the 2024–25 season. Despite the announcement that no team will be relegated after 2023–24 due to Gargždai bankruptcy, last place finishers Pieno žvaigždės decided to withdraw from the league due to struggles to meet league's budget requirements. Due to decreased number of teams, the league's format was changed, with the format being same as 2020–21 season, where 10 teams faced-off each other 4 times with top 8 teams advancing into Playoffs.

Location of teams in 2024–25 LKL

Team	Location	Arena	Capacity
7Bet–Lietkabelis	Panevėžys	Kalnapilio Arena	5,950
Cbet	Jonava	Jonava Arena	2,200
M Basket-Delamode	Telšiai	Telšiai sports arena	1,000
Neptūnas	Klaipėda	Švyturys Arena	6,200
Nevėžis–Optibet	Kėdainiai	Kėdainiai Arena	2,200
Rytas	Vilnius	Twinsbet Arena	10,000
Rytas	Vilnius	Active Vilnius Arena	2,500
Šiauliai–Casino Admiral	Šiauliai	Šiauliai Arena	5,700
Uniclub Bet – Juventus	Utena	Utena Arena	2,000
Wolves Twinsbet	Vilnius	Twinsbet Arena	10,000
Žalgiris	Kaunas	Žalgiris Arena	15,415

=== Personnel and kits ===
Team	Head coach	Captain	Kit manufacturer	Shirt sponsor (chest)
7Bet–Lietkabelis	(Serbia) Nenad Čanak	(Lithuania) Vytenis Lipkevičius	AGO	Lietkabelis, Norfa
Cbet	(Lithuania) Mantas Šernius	(Lithuania) Aurimas Majauskas	AGO	Litas, Talga
M Basket-Delamode	(Lithuania) Marius Kiltinavičius	(Lithuania) Donatas Sabeckis	Adikopas	Delamode Baltics, Saurida
Neptūnas	(Lithuania) Vidas Ginevičius	(Lithuania) Deividas Gailius	AGO	Amberton Hotel Group, Solorina
Nevėžis–Optibet	(Lithuania) Gediminas Petrauskas	(Lithuania) Ignas Vaitkus	AGO	Autotoja, Optibet
Rytas	(Lithuania) Giedrius Žibėnas	(Lithuania) Margiris Normantas	AGO	Norfa, Švyturys
Šiauliai–Casino Admiral	(Lithuania) Darius Pakamanis	(Lithuania) Saulius Kulvietis	AGO	AdmiralBet, Norfa
Uniclub Bet – Juventus	(Lithuania) Kęstutis Kemzūra	(Lithuania) Žygimantas Skučas	Hustle Point	Umaras, Uniclub Bet, Utenos mėsa, Utenos nealkoholinis
Wolves Twinsbet	(Italy) Alessandro Magro	(Lithuania) Regimantas Miniotas	Adikopas	Twinsbet
Žalgiris	(Italy) Andrea Trinchieri	(Lithuania) Edgaras Ulanovas	Puma	Go3, Topsport

=== Managerial changes ===
Team	Outgoing manager	Manner of departure	Date of vacancy	Position in table	Replaced with	Date of appointment
Wolves Twinsbet	(Lithuania) Nedas Pacevičius	End of contract	11 June 2024	Pre-season	(Italy) Alessandro Magro	1 July 2024
Uniclub Bet – Juventus	(Serbia) Oliver Kostić	Mutual agreement	28 May 2024	Pre-season	(Lithuania) Vytautas Buzas	28 May 2024
Cbet	(Lithuania) Virginijus Šeškus	Mutual agreement	15 July 2024	Pre-season	(Lithuania) Mantas Šernius	15 July 2024
M Basket-Delamode	(North Macedonia) Nikola Vasilev	Mutual agreement	12 August 2024	Pre-season	(Lithuania) Virginijus Šeškus	12 August 2024
Uniclub Bet – Juventus	(Lithuania) Vytautas Buzas	Appointed as assistant	10 November 2024	8th (3–5)	(Lithuania) Kęstutis Kemzūra	10 November 2024
M Basket-Delamode	(Lithuania) Virginijus Šeškus	Mutual agreement	22 November 2024	10th (1–8)	(Lithuania) Marius Kiltinavičius	22 November 2024
Neptūnas	(Greece) Georgios Vovoras	Sacked	3 April 2025	8th (9–14)	(Lithuania) Vidas Ginevičius (interim coach)	3 April 2025
Šiauliai–Casino Admiral	(Lithuania) Žydrūnas Urbonas	Mutual agreement	12 May 2025	7th (13–20)	(Lithuania) Darius Pakamanis (interim coach)	12 May 2025

== Regular season ==
=== League table ===
Pos	Team	Pld	W	L	PF	PA	PD	Qualification or relegation
1	Žalgiris	36	34	2	3286	2644	+642	Advance to playoffs
2	Rytas	36	29	7	3350	3033	+317	Advance to playoffs
3	7Bet–Lietkabelis	36	20 (Note: 7Bet–Lietkabelis are ahead of Wolves Twinsbet on head-to-head record: 7Bet–Lietkabelis 4–0 Wolves Twinsbet.)	16	3006	2921	+85	Advance to playoffs
4	Wolves Twinsbet	36	20	16	3253	3209	+44	Advance to playoffs
5	Cbet	36	19	17	3221	3240	−19	Advance to playoffs
6	Uniclub Bet – Juventus	36	16	20	3073	3157	−84	Advance to playoffs
7	Šiauliai–Casino Admiral	36	14 (Note: Šiauliai–Casino Admiral are ahead of Neptūnas on head-to-head record: Šiauliai–Casino Admiral 4–0 Neptūnas.)	22	3267	3417	−150	Advance to playoffs
8	Neptūnas	36	14	22	3050	3186	−136	Advance to playoffs
9	Nevėžis–Optibet	36	11	25	3268	3267	+1	
10	M Basket-Delamode	36	3	33	2845	3545	−700	

Source: LKL.lt
Rules for classification: 1) Win–loss record; 2) Percentage of wins; 3) Head–to–head record; 4) Head–to–head percentage of wins; 5) Head–to–head point difference; 6) Head–to–head points scored; 7) Point difference; 8) Points scored; 9) Lottery draw (Note: Head–to–head record is used only after all the matches between the teams in question have been played)

=== Results ===
Home \ Away	LIE	JON	MAZ	NEP	NEV	RYT	SIA	JUV	WOL	ZAL
7Bet–Lietkabelis	—	86–88	82–78	81–89	93–82	67–84	93–76	90–98	83–81	85–89
7Bet–Lietkabelis	—	72–68	90–69	84–79	71–79	82–75	92–73	94–89	78–64	76–88
Cbet	84–82	—	103–83	86–82	87–110	74–94	104–93	93–98	91–94	72–93
Cbet	92–87	—	116–55	93–98	96–89	99–104	106–101	78–72	81–77	81–91
M Basket–Delamode	93–87	72–83	—	107–96	77–98	83–93	93–95	46–91	86–95	82–88
M Basket–Delamode	65–96	86–107	—	77–96	71–101	81–113	74–102	85–94	86–106	80–105
Neptūnas	56–63	90–87	99–63	—	94–107	76–94	80–90	63–74	89–74	70–97
Neptūnas	72–91	97–98	85–79	—	96–90	92–82	90–95	100–88	85–97	67–80
Nevėžis–Optibet	78–85	93–105	93–87	74–83	—	83–93	106–90	74–78	85–90	76–89
Nevėžis–Optibet	97–82	80–102	109–80	81–83	—	101–105	92–104	105–74	106–107	80–84
Rytas	90–78	84–80	109–98	84–90	89–69	—	118–109	90–76	71–82	91–88
Rytas	90–72	112–82	102–69	103–85	99–98	—	103–96	90–75	92–88	76–83
Šiauliai–Casino Admiral	96–92	103–93	103–107	108–103	95–91	79–89	—	98–100	110–89	63–91
Šiauliai–Casino Admiral	89–104	90–94	122–96	91–78	96–92	82–102	—	86–68	85–92	66–71
Uniclub Bet – Juventus	70–79	79–80	92–72	92–99	91–84	78–86	101–88	—	100–110	67–128
Uniclub Bet – Juventus	74–75	109–115	80–77	100–94	101–91	90–104	102–79	—	94–86	75–96
Wolves Twinsbet	82–97	103–90	95–94	102–86	103–102	84–88	103–93	67–72	—	100–82
Wolves Twinsbet	88–92	91–87	109–85	96–84	94–99	89–102	100–84	87–83	—	69–81
Žalgiris	73–66	101–64	101–46	91–75	88–86	78–67	111–81	84–67	97–84	—
Žalgiris	79–83	89–62	109–63	84–49	105–88	97–79	98–56	84–81	89–75	—

Source: LKL.lt
Legend: Blue = home team win; Red = away team win.
Matches with lighter background shading were decided after overtime.

== Playoffs ==
Quarterfinals will be played in a best–of–three format, while the semifinals, third place game and final in a best-of-five format.

=== Bracket ===
Quarterfinals
Žalgiris	88	98	—
Neptūnas	75	70	—
Wolves Twinsbet	102	98	—
Cbet	103	102	—
Rytas	127	110	—
Šiauliai–Casino Admiral	81	84	—
7Bet–Lietkabelis	83	93	—
Uniclub Bet – Juventus	77	90	—

Semifinals
Žalgiris	73	98	86	—	—
Cbet	61	74	78	—	—
Rytas	86	73	87	76	94
7Bet–Lietkabelis	82	76	86	87	70

Finals
Žalgiris	89	83	80	84	76
Rytas	97	79	86	83	69
Third place
Cbet	90	85	78	73	—
7Bet–Lietkabelis	83	104	92	81	—

2024–25 LKL champions
Žalgiris
(25th title)

== Final standings ==
Pos	Team	Pld	W	L	Qualification or relegation
1	Žalgiris (C)	46	42	4	Already qualified to EuroLeague
2	Rytas	48	36	12	Qualification to Champions League regular season
3	7Bet–Lietkabelis	47	27	20	Qualification to EuroCup
4	Cbet	45	22	23	
5	Wolves Twinsbet	38	20	18	
6	Uniclub Bet – Juventus	38	16	22	Qualification to Champions League qualifying rounds
7	Šiauliai–Casino Admiral	38	14 (Note: Šiauliai–Casino Admiral are ahead of Neptūnas on head-to-head record: Šiauliai–Casino Admiral 4–0 Neptūnas.)	24	
8	Neptūnas	38	14	24	Qualification to EuroCup
9	Nevėžis–Optibet	36	11	25	
10	M Basket-Delamode	36	3	33	

Source: LKL.lt
(C) Champions

== Attendances to arenas ==
=== Average attendances ===
Pos	Team	Total	High	Low	Average	Change
1	Žalgiris	125,812	14,417	1,665	5,242	+5.6%
2	Rytas	83,395	9,310	1,054	3,474	−7.7%
3	Wolves Twinsbet	47,906	7,139	1,153	2,521	−21.7%
4	Neptūnas	43,293	4,889	1,197	2,278	+9.2%
5	Šiauliai–Casino Admiral	42,816	4,757	1,416	2,253	+22.6%
6	7Bet–Lietkabelis	45,707	4,096	952	1,987	−12.2%
7	Uniclub Bet – Juventus	26,492	2,827	627	1,394	−2.1%
8	Cbet	28,142	2,116	796	1,279	+26.9%
9	Nevėžis–Optibet	20,845	1,792	400	1,158	+6.0%
10	M Basket-Delamode	10,820	1,103	295	601	−21.5%
	League total	475,228	14,417	295	2,318	+6.5%

Source: LKL.lt

== Statistics ==
Source: LKL.lt
Last updated: 21 June 2025

=== Performance Index Rating ===
Rank	Player	Club	Games	Rating	PIR
1.	(United States) Ed Croswell	Nevėžis–Optibet	25	499	20
2.	(United States) Anthony Cowan	Wolves Twinsbet	35	692	19.8
3.	(United States) Joseph Girard III	Nevėžis–Optibet	35	646	18.5
4.	(France) Sylvain Francisco	Žalgiris	41	748	18.2
5.	(Israel) Amit Ebo	Nevėžis–Optibet	26	469	18

=== Points ===
Rank	Player	Club	Games	Points	PPG
1.	(United States) Joseph Girard III	Nevėžis–Optibet	35	734	21
2.	(United States) Brandon Childress	Cbet	33	597	18.1
3.	(United States) Gerry Blakes	Šiauliai–Casino Admiral	34	604	17.8
4.	(United States) Anthony Cowan	Wolves Twinsbet	35	575	16.4
5.	(Israel) Amit Ebo	Nevėžis–Optibet	26	426	16.4

=== Rebounds ===
Rank	Player	Club	Games	Rebounds	RPG
1.	(Lithuania) Martynas Pacevičius	Neptūnas	32	255	8
2.	(Puerto Rico) Arnaldo Toro	Uniclub Bet–Juventus	25	193	7.7
3.	(Lithuania) Paulius Danusevičius	7Bet–Lietkabelis	34	224	6.6
4.	(United States) Ed Croswell	Nevėžis–Optibet	25	164	6.6
5.	(United States) Sukhmail Mathon	Uniclub Bet–Juventus	29	176	6.1

=== Assists ===
Rank	Player	Club	Games	Assists	APG
1.	(Israel) Amit Ebo	Nevėžis–Optibet	26	222	8.5
2.	(United States) Desure Buie	Neptūnas	37	231	6.2
3.	(United States) Anthony Cowan	Wolves Twinsbet	35	205	5.9
4.	(Lithuania) Donatas Sabeckis	M Basket–Delamode	18	102	5.7
5.	(France) Sylvain Francisco	Žalgiris	41	224	5.5

=== Individual game highs ===
Category	Player	Club	Opponent	Statistic
PIR	(United States) Anthony Cowan	Wolves Twinsbet	Nevėžis–Optibet (May 7, 2025)	47
Points	(United States) Anthony Cowan	Wolves Twinsbet	Nevėžis–Optibet (May 7, 2025)	37
Rebounds	(Lithuania) Martynas Pacevičius	Neptūnas	Wolves Twinsbet (Oct 12, 2024)	17
Assists	(Lithuania) Donatas Sabeckis	M Basket–Delamode	Šiauliai–Casino Admiral (Sep 29, 2024)	13
Assists	(United States) Desure Buie	Neptūnas	Cbet (Apr 5, 2025)	13
Steals	(United States) Brandon Childress	Cbet	7Bet–Lietkabelis (Jun 11, 2025)	8
Blocks	(Lithuania) Artūras Gudaitis	Rytas	7Bet–Lietkabelis (May 30, 2025)	5

=== Other statistics ===
Category	Player	Club	Games	Average
Steals	(United States) Brandon Childress	Cbet	33	1.8
Blocks	(Lithuania) Artūras Gudaitis	Rytas	26	1.1
Turnovers	(Israel) Amit Ebo	Nevėžis–Optibet	26	4.4
Fouls drawn	(United States) Anthony Cowan	Wolves Twinsbet	35	6.4
Minutes	(United States) Dominic Green	Uniclub Bet–Juventus	38	29:09
FT %	(Lithuania) Modestas Babraitis	Cbet	26	93.3%
FT %	(United States) Desure Buie	Neptūnas	37	93.3%
2-Point %	(Lithuania) Laurynas Birutis	Žalgiris	46	74.6%
3-Point %	(Lithuania) Artūras Gudaitis	Rytas	27	100%

=== Club statistics ===
Category	Club	Average
PIR	Žalgiris	107.8
Points	Rytas	92
Rebounds	Rytas	38.7
Assists	Wolves Twinsbet	20.5
Steals	Cbet	7.9
Blocks	Rytas	3.1
Turnovers	M Basket–Delamode	15.8
FT %	Wolves Twinsbet	80.4%
2-Point %	Žalgiris	61.9%
3-Point %	Wolves Twinsbet	38%

== Awards ==
All official awards of the 2024–25 LKL season.

=== Regular Season MVP ===
Pos.	Player	Team	Source
PG	(United States) Anthony Cowan Jr.	Wolves Twinsbet	

=== LKL Finals MVP ===
Pos.	Player	Team	Source
PG	(France) Sylvain Francisco	Žalgiris	

=== Breakthrough of the Year ===
Player	Team	Source
(Lithuania) Martynas Pacevičius	Neptūnas	

=== Coach of the Year ===
Coach	Team	Source
(Lithuania) Mantas Šernius	Cbet	

=== All-LKL Team ===
Pos.	Player	Team	Source
PG	(France) Sylvain Francisco	Žalgiris	
PG	(United States) Brandon Childress	Cbet	
SG	(Lithuania) Mantas Rubštavičius	7Bet–Lietkabelis	
SF	(Lithuania) Gytis Radzevičius	Rytas	
C	(Lithuania) Laurynas Birutis	Žalgiris	

=== Player of the month ===
Month	Player	Team	PIR	Source
2024
September–October	(United States) Anthony Cowan Jr.	Wolves Twinsbet	19.3	
November	(Germany) Kay Bruhnke	M Basket–Delamode	24	
December	(United States) Chauncey Collins	M Basket–Delamode	29	
2025
January–February	(Israel) Amit Ebo	Nevėžis–Optibet	24.8	
March	(Lithuania) Gytis Radzevičius	Rytas	27.3	
April	(United States) Dominic Brewton	Cbet	21.6	

== LKL clubs in international competitions ==
Euroleague Basketball competitions
Team	Competition	Progress	Result	W–L
Žalgiris	EuroLeague	Regular season	13th place out of 18 teams	15–19
Wolves Twinsbet	EuroCup	Regular season Group A	4th place out of 10 teams (11–8)	11–9
Wolves Twinsbet	EuroCup	Eightfinals	Loss vs. (Romania) U-BT Cluj-Napoca	11–9
7Bet–Lietkabelis	EuroCup	Regular season Group B	9th place out of 10 teams	5–13

FIBA competitions
Team	Competition	Progress	Result	W–L
Rytas	Champions League	Regular season Group F	1st place out of 4 teams (5–1)	7–5
Rytas	Champions League	Round of 16 Group J	3rd place out of 4 teams (2–4)	7–5
Uniclub Bet – Juventus	Champions League	Qualifying tournament 4 Quarter–finals	Win vs. (Serbia) Spartak Office Shoes	1–1
Uniclub Bet – Juventus	Champions League	Qualifying tournament 4 Semi–finals	Loss vs. (Italy) Dinamo BDS Sassari	1–1
Neptūnas	FIBA Europe Cup	Qualifying round	Loss vs. (Spain) Surne Bilbao Basket	0–2
