= Vytenis Jasikevičius =

Lithuanian basketball player

Personal information
- Born: November 21, 1985 (age 40) Kaunas, Lithuanian SSR, Soviet Union
- Listed height: 6 ft 1.5 in (1.87 m)
- Listed weight: 177 lb (80 kg)

Career information
- NBA draft: 2007: undrafted
- Playing career: 2002–2015
- Position: Point guard
- Number: 10

Career history
- 2002–2009: Žalgiris Kaunas
- 2002–2006: →Žalgiris-2 Kaunas
- 2007–2008: →Sūduva-Arvi Marijampolė
- 2008–2009, 2010-2011: →LSU-Atletas Kaunas
- 2011–2013: TrioBet Kėdainiai
- 2013–2014: Žalgiris-2 Kaunas

Career highlights
- LKAL Champion (2003); NKL Three-Point Contest champion (2006); LKL champion (2007)
Medals
Men's basketball
Representing Lithuania
Universiade
Gold medal – first place	2007 Summer Universiade	Team

Vytenis Jasikevičius (born November 21, 1985) is a former Lithuanian professional basketball player, who last played for Žalgiris-2 Kaunas of National Basketball League. Standing at 1.87 m (6 ft 2 in), he plays at the point guard position.

== Personal life ==
He is the younger brother of the EuroLeague Legend and Lithuanian basketball star Šarūnas Jasikevičius.

On 15 July 2008, Vytenis married Monika Gidraitė.
