= Ignas Vaitkus =

Lithuanian basketball player

BC Omega-Tauras-LSU
- Position: Small forward / shooting guard
- League: National Basketball League

Personal information
- Born: 22 February 1993 (age 33) Šiauliai, Lithuania
- Listed height: 196 cm (6 ft 5 in)
- Listed weight: 97 kg (214 lb)

Career information
- NBA draft: 2015: undrafted
- Playing career: 2011–present

Career history
- 2011–2012: Saulė-Aukštabalis Šiauliai
- 2012–2013: Meresta Pakruojis
- 2013–2014: BC Mažeikiai
- 2014–2015: Nafta-Uni-Akvaservis Klaipėda
- 2015–2016: BC Šilutė
- 2016: BC Vytis
- 2016–2017: Nevėžis Kėdainiai
- 2017–2019: BC Šiauliai
- 2019–2022: Juventus Utena
- 2022–2023: Pieno žvaigždės Pasvalys
- 2023–2026: Nevėžis Kėdainiai
- 2026-present: BC Omega-Tauras-LSU
Medals
Representing Lithuania
Men's basketball
Summer Universiade
Gold medal – first place	2017 Taipei	Team
Men's 3x3 basketball
FIBA 3x3 World Cup
Silver medal – second place	2022 Antwerp	Team
FIBA 3x3 Europe Cup
Gold medal – first place	2025 Copenhagen	Team

Ignas Vaitkus (born 22 February 1993) is a Lithuanian professional basketball player.

== Early career ==
Born in Šiauliai, Vaitkus started his career with Saulė-Aukštabalis Šiauliai of the third-tier Regional Basketball League (RKL), where he played for one season in 2011–12. In 2012, he moved to the NKL when he signed with Meresta Pakruojis.

== Professional career ==
Vaitkus started his professional career with BC Mažeikiai in 2014. He made his debut in the Lithuanian Basketball League on 27 September 2014, scoring 17 points in a loss against Neptūnas Klaipėda.

On 3 August 2023, Vaitkus returned to Nevėžis Kėdainiai.

== National team career ==
Vaitkus won gold medal with the Lithuanian team during the 2017 Summer Universiade after defeating the United States' team 74–85 in the final.
