= Simonas Serapinas =

Lithuanian basketball player

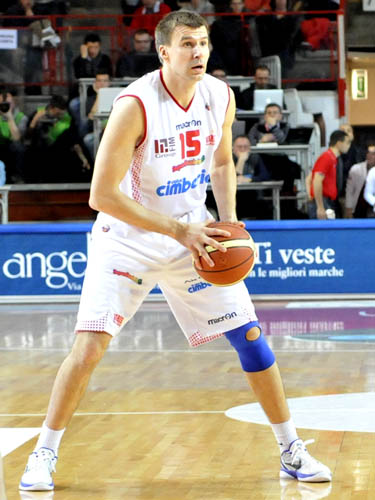
- Serapinas in 2011

Neptūnas Klaipėda
- Title: Assistant coach
- League: LKL

Personal information
- Born: 24 February 1982 (age 44) Klaipėda, Lithuanian SSR, Soviet Union
- Listed height: 1.97 m (6 ft 6 in)
- Listed weight: 97 kg (214 lb)

Career information
- Playing career: 2002–2020
- Position: Small forward / power forward

Career history

Playing
- 2000–2001: Kaunas „LKKA-Atletas"
- 2001–2006: Žalgiris Kaunas
- 2002: →Alita Alytus
- 2003: →Nevėžis
- 2006–2008: Aris Thessaloniki
- 2008: Prokom Trefl Sopot
- 2008–2009: Azovmash Mariupol
- 2010: Neptūnas Klaipėda
- 2011: Cimberio Varese
- 2011–2012: Telekom Baskets Bonn
- 2012–2013: Azovmash Mariupol
- 2014–2015: Mitteldeutscher BC
- 2015: BC Mažeikiai
- 2015–2016: Dzūkija Alytus
- 2016–2019: BC Gargždai-SC
- 2019–2020: BC Šilutė

Coaching
- 2017–2019: BC Gargždai-SC
- 2020–2022: Neptūnas-Akvaservis
- 2022–2024: BC Šilutė
- 2024–2025: Neptūnas-Akvaservis
- 2025–present: Neptūnas Klaipėda (assistant)

Simonas Serapinas (born 24 February 1982) is a Lithuanian professional basketball coach and former player. Standing at 1.97 m (6 ft 5 1/2 in), he played at the small forward and power forward positions.

== Pro career ==
He started his professional career in 2000, playing for Kaunas „LKKA-Atletas". He also played in Alita Alytus and BC Nevėžis. In 2003 he started to play for Žalgiris Kaunas, for which he played until 2006. Later he played for Greek Aris, Polish Prokom Trefl Sopot and Ukrainian Azovmash Mariupol, also in Telekom Baskets Bonn of German League. He also had stints in Neptūnas and Pallacanestro Varese.

On 15 January 2015 he signed BC Mažeikiai of the Lietuvos krepšinio lyga.

== Career statistics ==
Legend
GP	Games played	GS	Games started	MPG	Minutes per game
FG%	Field-goal percentage	3P%	3-point field-goal percentage	FT%	Free-throw percentage
RPG	Rebounds per game	APG	Assists per game	SPG	Steals per game
BPG	Blocks per game	PPG	Points per game	PIR	Performance index rating
**Bold**	Career high

=== Euroleague ===
Year	Team	GP	GS	MPG	FG%	3P%	FT%	RPG	APG	SPG	BPG	PPG	PIR
2003–04	Žalgiris	4	1	7.2	.500	.000	.500	.3	.0	.5	.0	1.3	0.1
2004–05	Žalgiris	11	4	14.5	.333	.353	.714	**1.9**	.5	.2	.0	4.6	1.1
2005–06	Žalgiris	**19**	**10**	**20.4**	.574	**.417**	**.727**	**1.9**	**1.1**	**1.3**	**.1**	**8.1**	**7.3**
2006–07	Aris	**19**	6	9.2	.500	.409	.533	1.5	.1	.3	**.1**	2.7	2.3
2007–08	Aris	11	0	11.5	**.625**	.300	.000	1.8	.4	.2	**.1**	2.5	2.0

== Awards and achievements ==
- LKL Champion - 2004, 2005
- Baltic League Champion - 2005
- Greek A1 League 3rd place - 2007
- Polish League Champion - 2008
