= Mindaugas Stašys =

Lithuanian basketball player (born 1986)

Olimpas Palanga
- Position: Point guard
- League: NKL

Personal information
- Born: February 28, 1986 (age 40) Klaipėda, Lithuanian SSR, Soviet Union
- Listed height: 180 cm (5 ft 11 in)
- Listed weight: 70 kg (154 lb)

Career information
- Playing career: 2010–present

Career history
- 2010–2011: Neptūnas Klaipėda
- 2011–2012: BC Mažeikiai
- 2012–2013: LSU-Atletas Kaunas
- 2013–2014: BC Saldus (RKL)
- 2014–2018: Nafta-Universitetas Klaipėda
- 2018–2019: BC Tauragė
- 2019–2020: BC Telšiai
- 2020–2021: BC Šilutė
- 2021: BC Vytis
- 2021–2023: BC Gargždai-SC
- 2023-2024: BC Kretinga
- 2024-present: Olimpas Palanga

Career highlights
- Lithuanian League assists leader (2013)

Mindaugas Stašys (born February 28, 1986) is a Lithuanian professional basketball player who plays the point guard position.
