= Rokas Jokubaitis =

Lithuanian basketball player (born 2000)

- Jokubaitis with Bayern Munich in 2026

No. 31 – Bayern Munich
- Position: Point guard
- League: BBL; EuroLeague

Personal information
- Born: 19 November 2000 (age 25) Mažeikiai, Lithuania
- Listed height: 1.93 m (6 ft 4 in)
- Listed weight: 91 kg (201 lb)

Career information
- NBA draft: 2021: 2nd round, 34th overall pick
- Drafted by: Oklahoma City Thunder
- Playing career: 2017–present

Career history
- 2017–2021: Žalgiris Kaunas
- 2017–2019: →Žalgiris-2 Kaunas
- 2021–2024: FC Barcelona
- 2024–2025: Maccabi Tel Aviv
- 2025–present: Bayern Munich

Career highlights
- EuroLeague Rising Star (2022); Israeli Cup winner (2025); Israeli Cup Finals MVP (2025); Israeli League Cup winner (2024); Spanish League champion (2023); Spanish League All-Young Players Team (2022); Spanish Cup winner (2022); 3× LKL champion (2019–2021); 2× King Mindaugas Cup winner (2020, 2021); LKL Best Young Player (2021); NKL Best Young Player (2019)
- Stats at Basketball Reference
Medals
Men's basketball
Representing Lithuania
FIBA U16 European Championship
Silver medal – second place	2016 Poland	Team

Rokas Jokubaitis (born 19 November 2000) is a Lithuanian professional basketball player for Bayern Munich of the German Basketball Bundesliga (BBL) and the EuroLeague.

== Early life and youth career ==
Jokubaitis was born in Mažeikiai, Lithuania. He grew up playing youth basketball at the Vladas Knašius Basketball School in Klaipėda before moving to the youth academy of Žalgiris. Jokubaitis was named to the all-tournament team at the 2018 Kaunas Tournament after averaging 15 points and 8.3 assists per game and leading Žalgiris to a third-place finish.

== Professional career ==
=== Žalgiris (2017–2021) ===
On 9 January 2018, Jokubaitis scored a game-high 31 points for Žalgiris-2 in a highly publicized exhibition game against LaMelo Ball and Prienai. On 5 May, he made his senior debut for Žalgiris in its Lithuanian Basketball League (LKL) regular season finale against Pieno žvaigždės. In the 2018–19 season, Jokubaitis was named the Best Young Player in the second-tier National Basketball League after averaging 13.2 points, 5.2 assists and 3.4 rebounds per game for Žalgiris-2.

On 14 June 2019, Jokubaitis signed a three-year contract extension with Žalgiris. In the 2020–21 season, he averaged seven points and 2.5 assists per game in the EuroLeague. Jokubaitis was the runner-up to Usman Garuba for the EuroLeague Rising Star award. He averaged eight points and four assists per game in the LKL and was named Best Young Player of the league.

=== FC Barcelona (2021–2024) ===
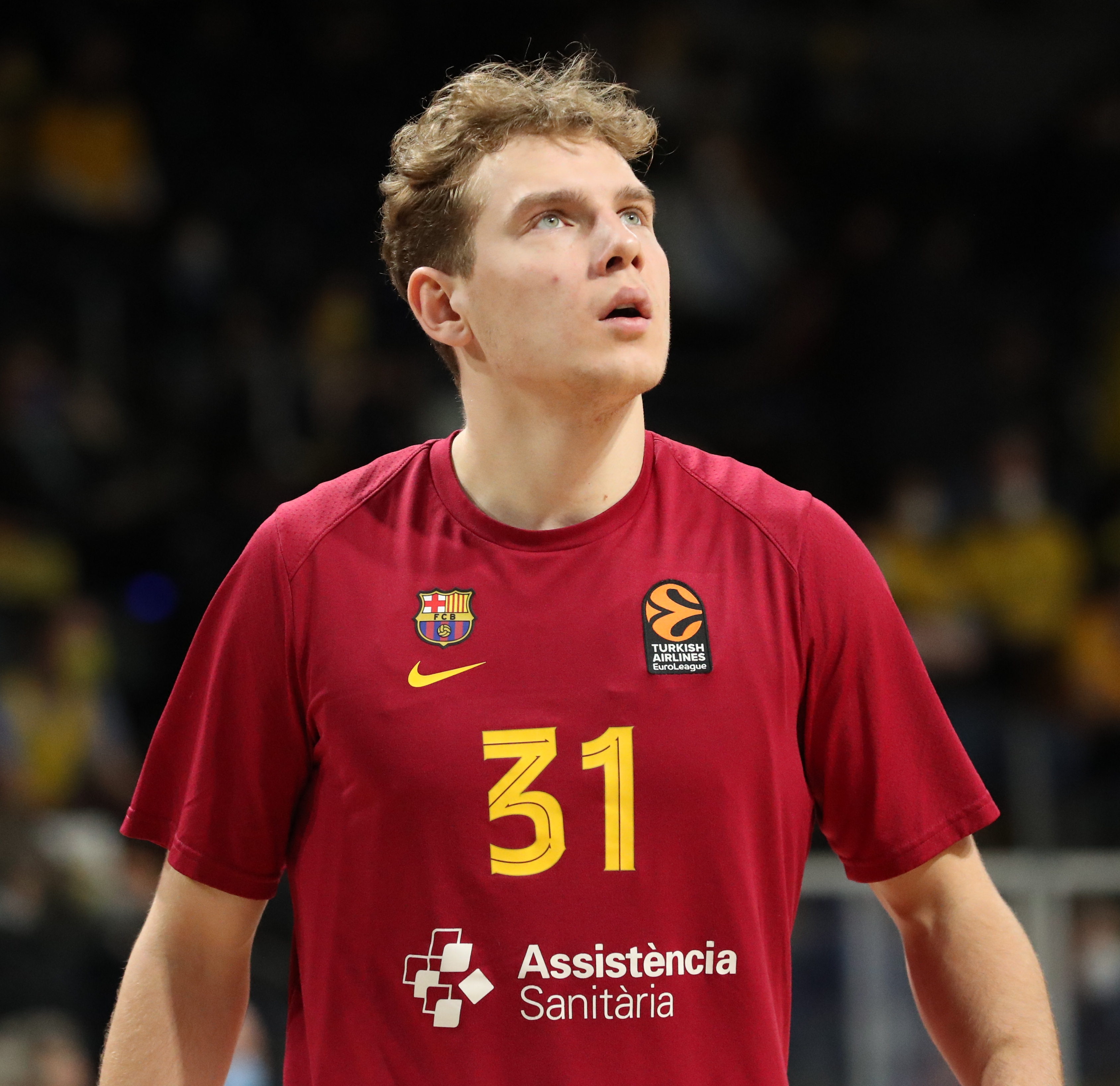
Jokubaitis with FC Barcelona in 2022

On 21 July 2021, Jokubaitis signed a four-year contract with FC Barcelona of the Spanish Liga ACB and the EuroLeague. In 2023–24 in 74 games averaging 16 minutes per game he averaged 6.2 points and 2.7 assists per game and shot 50% on two-point field goals. On 23 July 2024, Jokubaitis mutually parted ways with the club.

=== Maccabi Tel Aviv (2024–2025) ===
On 24 July 2024, Jokubaitis signed with Maccabi Tel Aviv of the Israeli Basketball Premier League and the EuroLeague.

=== Bayern Munich (2025–present) ===
On 12 August 2025, Jokubaitis signed a three-year contract with Bayern Munich of the German Basketball Bundesliga (BBL) and the EuroLeague. On 4 September, Jokubaitis was ruled out for at least six months after suffering an ACL and meniscus injury in his left knee during a EuroBasket game.

=== NBA draft rights ===
Jokubaitis was selected with the 34th overall pick by the Oklahoma City Thunder in the 2021 NBA draft. Later on the draft-day, his rights were traded to the New York Knicks, alongside Miles McBride, in exchange for Jeremiah Robinson-Earl. On 3 August 2021, it was announced that Jokubaitis would return to FC Barcelona after the conclusion of the 2021 NBA Summer League.

== National team career ==
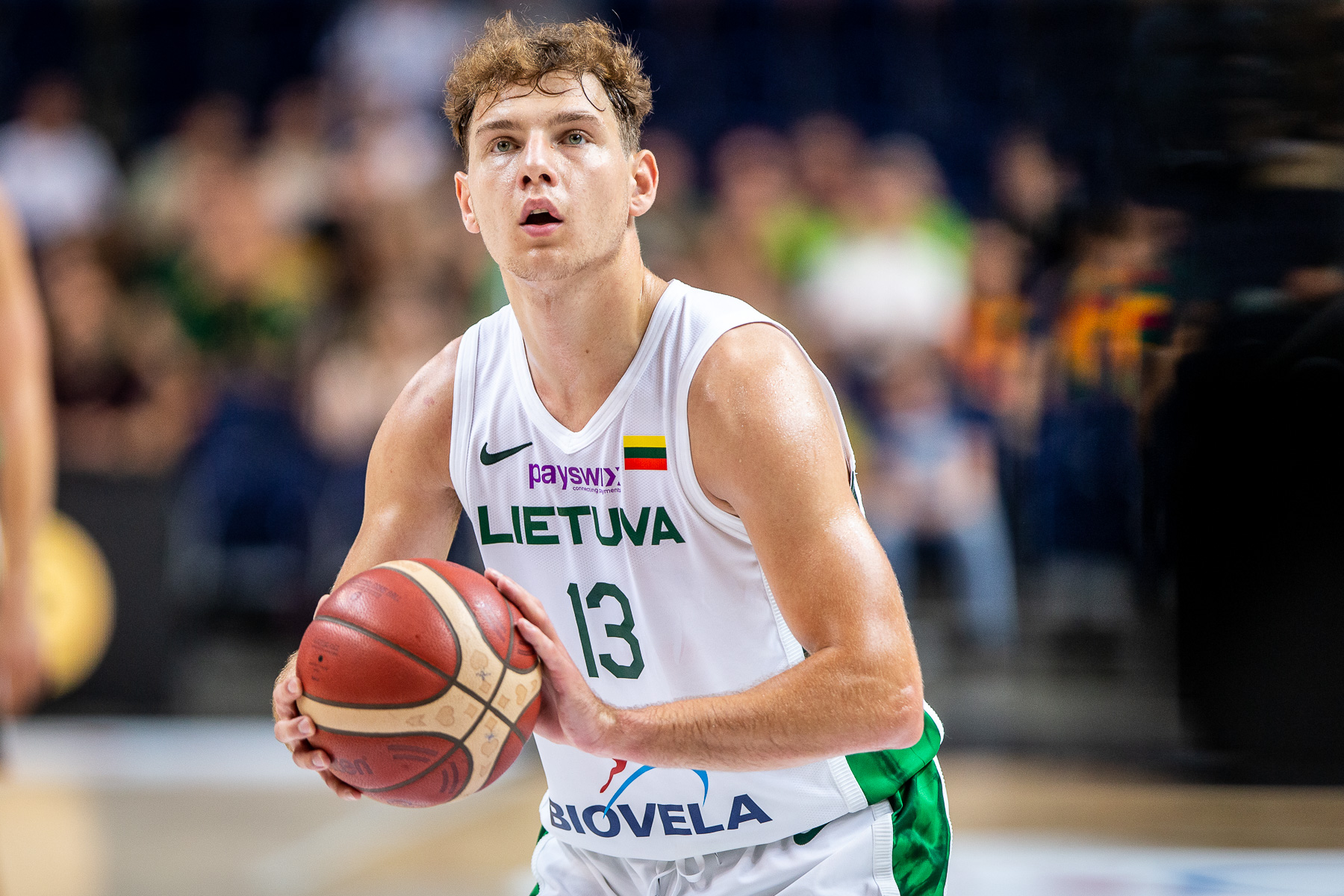
Jokubaitis with the senior Lithuania men's national team in 2022

Jokubaitis played for Lithuania at the 2016 FIBA U16 European Championship in Poland. He averaged 10 points and helped his team win a silver medal. Jokubaitis was the youngest player at the 2017 FIBA Under-19 World Cup in Egypt, averaging 10 points and 5.3 assists per game for the sixth-place team. At the 2018 FIBA U18 European Championship in Latvia, he averaged 12.9 points and 5.6 rebounds per game as his team finished fifth. Jokubaitis led Lithuania to fourth place at the 2019 FIBA Under-19 World Cup in Greece, where he averaged 11.3 points and 5.6 assists per game.

On 24 February 2020, Jokubaitis made his senior national team debut for Lithuania during EuroBasket qualification. In June and July 2021, he played at the FIBA Olympic Qualifying Tournament in Kaunas.

In September 2025, Jokubaitis had to miss the rest of Eurobasket 2025 for Lithuania as he suffered a serious ligament injury and would be out for six months.

== Personal life ==
Jokubaitis' father, Aivaras, played professional basketball in Lithuania and Poland. His mother and sister also played the sport.

== Career statistics ==
Legend
GP	Games played	GS	Games started	MPG	Minutes per game
FG%	Field-goal percentage	3P%	3-point field-goal percentage	FT%	Free-throw percentage
RPG	Rebounds per game	APG	Assists per game	SPG	Steals per game
BPG	Blocks per game	PPG	Points per game	PIR	Performance index rating
**Bold**	Career high

=== EuroLeague ===
Year	Team	GP	GS	MPG	FG%	3P%	FT%	RPG	APG	SPG	BPG	PPG	PIR
2018–19	Žalgiris	12	0	5.8	.500	.200	.800	.5	.6	.0	**.1**	2.6	1.9
2019–20	Žalgiris	10	0	6.4	.444	.500	.750	.5	1.3	.3	.0	2.2	2.0
2020–21	Žalgiris	31	5	20.9	.454	.388	.756	1.7	2.5	.5	.0	7.0	6.8
2021–22	Barcelona	37	2	16.7	**.563**	**.568**	.714	1.6	2.6	.4	.0	7.1	7.5
2022–23	Barcelona	**39**	0	14.8	.416	.413	.776	2.0	2.6	.3	**.1**	5.3	6.6
2023–24	Barcelona	36	2	15.5	.443	.277	.652	1.7	2.8	.3	**.1**	5.3	5.5
2024-25	Maccabi Tel Aviv	28	**24**	**24.5**	.544	.371	**.857**	**3.2**	**4.7**	**1.0**	.0	**12.6**	**15.6**
Career		193	33	16.4	.488	.398	.774	1.8	2.7	.4	.0	6.6	7.4

=== Domestic leagues ===
Year	Team	League	GP	MPG	FG%	3P%	FT%	RPG	APG	SPG	BPG	PPG
2017–18	(Lithuania) Žalgiris-2	NKL	46	24.7	.458	.333	.822	2.8	4.5	1.1	.0	9.7
2017–18	(Lithuania) Žalgiris	LKL	3	12.9	.615	.250	—	2.0	2.3	.3	—	5.7
2018–19	(Lithuania) Žalgiris-2	NKL	22	24.8	.537	.371	.710	3.4	5.0	.9	.1	12.4
2018–19	(Lithuania) Žalgiris	LKL	34	11.4	.442	.250	.774	.8	1.5	.5	.0	4.4
2019–20	(Lithuania) Žalgiris	LKL	19	17.3	.542	.457	.808	2.1	2.7	.5	.0	7.4
2020–21	(Lithuania) Žalgiris	LKL	43	20.0	.477	.330	.689	1.6	3.9	.7	.0	7.9
2021–22	(Spain) Barcelona	ACB	39	16.9	.493	.409	.753	1.7	2.8	.4	.0	7.3
2022–23	(Spain) Barcelona	ACB	42	18.7	.446	.310	.788	2.0	3.9	.5	.0	7.3
2023–24	(Spain) Barcelona	ACB	34	16.6	.576	.500	.719	1.4	2.6	.3	.0	7.0
2024–25	(Israel) Maccabi	Ligat HaAl	22	22.5	.523	.404	.882	2.7	4.1	.9	.0	11.0
