= Sandis Buškevics =

Latvian basketball player and coach

BC Telšiai
- Title: Head coach
- League: NKL

Personal information
- Born: January 28, 1977 (age 49) Ventspils, Latvian Soviet Socialist Republic, USSR
- Listed height: 6 ft 3 in (1.91 m)
- Listed weight: 176 lb (80 kg)

Career information
- Playing career: 1994–2012
- Position: Point guard
- Number: 8, 24, 28, 6
- Coaching career: 2012–present

Career history

Playing
- 1994–2003: BK Ventspils
- 2003–2004: Galatasaray S.K.
- 2004: Ural Great Perm
- 2004–2005: BC Dynamo Moscow
- 2005–2006: Lietuvos Rytas
- 2006–2008: ASK Rīga
- 2008–2009: Snaidero Udine
- 2009–2010: BK Ventspils
- 2010–2011: BK Liepājas Lauvas
- 2011–2012: Azad University Tehran BC

Coaching
- 2012–2014: Valga/Maks&Moorits
- 2014–2017: Lietuvos Rytas (assistant)
- 2018: BK Jēkabpils
- 2018–2019: Lietkabelis Panevėžys (assistant)
- 2019–2023: Neptūnas Klaipėda (assistant)
- 2023–2024: Olimpas Palanga
- 2024–present: BC Telšiai

Career highlights
- As player: 5× Latvian League champion (2000–2003, 2007); Lithuanian League champion (2006); As head coach: NKL champion (2025)

Sandis Buškevics (born 28 January 1977 in Ventspils, Latvia) is a Latvian professional basketball coach and former player. He is currently the head coach for BC Telšiai of the Nacionalinė krepšinio lyga (NKL). Buškevics was also a member of the Latvia national basketball team.

== Coaching career ==
In January 2018, Buškevics became the head coach of BK Jēkabpils. On 11 December 2021, he became the interim head coach of Neptūnas Klaipėda after Tomas Gaidamavičius resigned due to poor results in the 2021–22 season.
