= Martynas Gecevičius =

Lithuanian basketball player

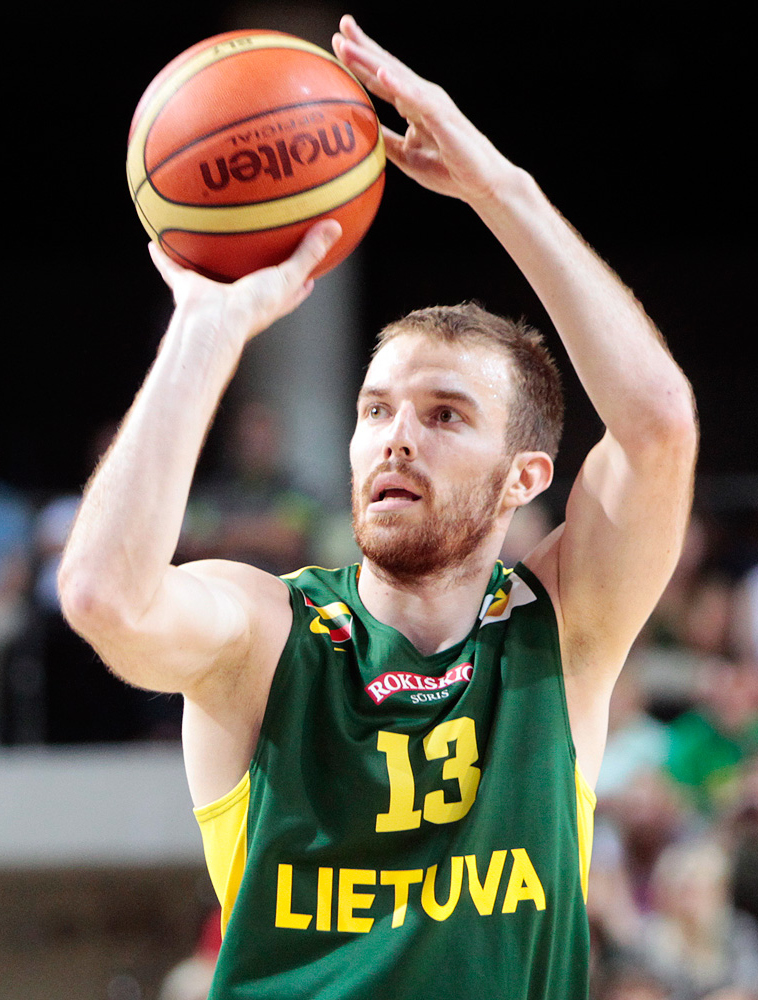
- Gecevičius, with Lithuania, in 2013.

BC Stekas Ukmergė
- Position: Shooting guard
- League: NKL

Personal information
- Born: 16 May 1988 (age 38) Vilnius, Lithuania
- Listed height: 6 ft 4 in (1.93 m)
- Listed weight: 205 lb (93 kg)

Career information
- NBA draft: 2010: undrafted
- Playing career: 2004–present

Career history
- 2004–2007: Sakalai
- 2007–2011: Lietuvos rytas
- 2011–2013: Olympiacos
- 2013–2015: Lietuvos rytas
- 2015–2016: TED Ankara Kolejliler
- 2016–2017: CAI Zaragoza
- 2017–2018: Stelmet Zielona Góra
- 2018–2019: Skycop Prienai
- 2019–2020: Aris Thessaloniki
- 2020–2023: Juventus Utena
- 2023–2024: M Basket Mažeikiai
- 2024–2026: BC Telšiai
- 2026-present: BC Stekas Ukmergė

Career highlights
- 2× EuroLeague champion (2012, 2013); EuroCup champion (2009); 2× Baltic League champion (2007, 2009); 2× LKL champion (2009, 2010); 2× LKF Cup winner (2009, 2010); LKL Finals MVP (2010); LKL assists leader (2015); 3× LKL All-Star (2010, 2011, 2014); Greek League champion (2012); Liga ACB best three-point shooter (2017); All-VTB United League First Team (2011); All-VTB United League Second Team (2014); NKL champion (2025); KMT Three-Point Contest champion (2019)
Medals
Men's basketball
Representing Lithuania
FIBA World Cup
| Bronze medal – third place | Turkey 2010 |
FIBA Europe Under-20 Championship
| Silver medal – second place | 2008 Latvia | U-20 Team |
FIBA Europe Under-18 Championship
| Silver medal – second place | 2006 Greece | U-18 team |

Martynas Gecevičius (born 16 May 1988) is a Lithuanian professional basketball player for BC Stekas Ukmergė of the National Basketball League (NKL). Standing at 1.93 m (6 ft 4 in), he primarily plays at the shooting guard position.

== Professional career ==
Gecevičius debuted in the EuroLeague during the 2007–08 season, averaging 3.2 points per game, which he increased to 14.2 points per game in the 2009–10 season, making him a desirable player in the 2010 summer transfer market. His Euroleague career high is 21 points, scored against Efes. During the 2010–11 season, he averaged 11.5 points per game in the LKL, and 9.3 points per game in the Baltic Basketball League.

After signing with Olympiacos, Gecevičius won the EuroLeague 2011–12 season championship, and the 2011–12 Greek League championship. He also won the 2012–13 season championship of the EuroLeague, with Olympiacos.

On 31 July 2013, it was announced that Gecevičius will return to Lietuvos rytas.

On 9 July 2015, Gecevičius signed with TED Ankara Kolejliler for the 2015–16 BSL season.

On 19 August 2016, he signed with Spanish club CAI Zaragoza. On 16 May 2017, Gecevičius was named best three-point shooter of the Liga Endesa.

On 26 October 2017, he signed with Polish club Stelmet Zielona Góra.

On 16 September 2018, Gecevičius returned to the Lithuanian league by signing with Skycop Prienai. He won the King Mindaugas Cup Three-Point Contest on 17 February 2019.

On 24 September 2019, Gecevičius signed a one-year contract with Aris Thessaloniki of the Greek Basket League.

On 9 July 2020, Gecevičius signed a one-year deal with Juventus Utena of the Lithuanian Basketball League (LKL). On 19 May 2021, he re-signed with the club until the end of the 2022–2023 season.

On 4 October 2023, Gecevičius signed with M Basket Mažeikiai of the Lithuanian Basketball League (LKL).

== National team career ==
At the 2010 FIBA World Championship, Gecevičius played for the senior Lithuanian national basketball team, which won Bronze medals. He was a candidate to be on the Lithuania national team roster for EuroBasket 2011. He was also a candidate to be on Lithuanian roster for EuroBasket 2013, however on August 22, 2013, it was announced that he left the national team, due to head coach Jonas Kazlauskas' decision.

In 2015, he was included into the national team's extended candidates list, but was not invited to the training camp.

== Career statistics ==
Legend
| GP | Games played | GS | Games started | MPG | Minutes per game |
| FG% | Field-goal percentage | 3P% | 3-point field-goal percentage | FT% | Free-throw percentage |
| RPG | Rebounds per game | APG | Assists per game | SPG | Steals per game |
| BPG | Blocks per game | PPG | Points per game | PIR | Performance index rating |
| **Bold** | Career high |

=== EuroLeague ===
| † | Denotes seasons in which Gecevičius won the EuroLeague |

| Year | Team | GP | GS | MPG | FG% | 3P% | FT% | RPG | APG | SPG | BPG | PPG | PIR |
|---|---|---|---|---|---|---|---|---|---|---|---|---|---|
| 2007–08 | Lietuvos rytas | **18** | 0 | 9.3 | **.500** | .393 | **1.000** | .7 | .1 | .4 | — | 3.2 | 2.6 |
| 2009–10 | Lietuvos rytas | 10 | **10** | **33.7** | .476 | **.452** | .889 | 2.9 | **3.3** | **1.3** | — | **14.2** | **14.5** |
| 2010–11 | Lietuvos rytas | 15 | 9 | 28.8 | .462 | .412 | .839 | **3.0** | 2.6 | .5 | **.1** | 11.7 | 12.6 |
| 2011–12† | Olympiacos | **18** | 3 | 16.7 | .417 | .413 | .816 | 1.3 | .8 | .3 | — | 6.2 | 5.7 |
| 2012–13† | Olympiacos | 15 | 0 | 6.0 | .174 | .222 | .750 | .8 | .3 | .1 | — | 1.0 | .3 |
| 2013–14 | Lietuvos rytas | 10 | 9 | 29.1 | .443 | .443 | .792 | 2.7 | 2.0 | 1.2 | — | 12.4 | 12.1 |
| Career | | 86 | 31 | 18.8 | .443 | .413 | .848 | 1.7 | 1.3 | .6 | .0 | 7.3 | 7.1 |

== Awards and achievements ==
- Baltic League Presidents Cup Winner: (2008)
- 2× Baltic League Champion: (2007, 2009)
- EuroCup Champion: (2009)
- 2× Lithuanian Federation Cup Winner: (2009, 2010)
- 2× Lithuanian League Champion: (2009, 2010)
- 2010 FIBA World Championship, Turkey: Bronze
- 2× EuroLeague Champion: (2012, 2013)
- Greek League Champion: (2012)
