= Vainauskas =

Vainauskas is a surname. Notable people with the surname include:

- Alfredas Vainauskas (born 1961), Lithuanian basketball coach
- Gedvydas Vainauskas (born 1955), Lithuanian journalist
