= Valdas Vasylius =

Lithuanian basketball player (born 1983)

Personal information
- Born: 3 September 1983 (age 43) Klaipėda, Lithuanian SSR, Soviet Union
- Listed height: 6 ft 8 in (2.03 m)
- Listed weight: 210 lb (95 kg)

Career information
- High school: Norfolk Collegiate School (Norfolk, Virginia)
- College: Old Dominion (2003–2007)
- NBA draft: 2007: undrafted
- Playing career: 2007–present
- Position: Forward

Career history
- 2007: Anwil Włocławek
- 2007: Rethymno Aegean
- 2008: Nevėžis Kėdainiai
- 2008–2009: Neptūnas Klaipėda
- 2009–2010: Krasnye Krylia Samara
- 2010–2011: Neptūnas Klaipėda
- 2011–2012: Šiauliai
- 2012: Dnipro
- 2013–2015: Neptūnas Klaipėda
- 2015–2016: Lietkabelis Panevėžys
- 2016–2017: BC Juventus
- 2017-2018: Klaipėdos Nafta-Universitetas
- 2018–2019: BC Nevėžis
- 2019: BC Šilutė
- 2019–2020: Grindavík
- 2020–2022: BC Šilutė
- 2022–2023: Grindavík
- 2023-2024: Jurbarkas-Karys
- 2024: Akmenės r. Akmenės kraštas
- 2024-present: BC Šilalės Lūšis

Career highlights
- Lithuanian League steals leader (2011); BBL MVP (2012); LKL All-Star (2014); NBL champion (2018)

Valdas Vasylius (born 3 September 1983) is a Lithuanian basketball player. He played collegiately at Old Dominion University. He also represented the Lithuanian national basketball team at the 2007 Summer Universiade.

Growing up in Lithuania, Vasylius learned to speak Lithuanian, Russian and German before learning English.

== College career ==
Vasylius began as the sixth man on the ODU squad, but was the star player by his senior year, being named to the All-CAA First team.

== Professional career ==
After graduating with a degree in international business, Vasylius returned to Europe to play with Polish team Anwil Włocławek, signing a one-year deal with the club. He left Polish team due to lack of playing time and joined Rethymno BC in Greece and later BC Nevėžis in Lithuania. In summer he signed with his hometown team BC Neptūnas. While a talented offensive player, his lack of athleticism hurt his chances of catching on with an NBA team. He also played for BC Siauliai during the 2011–2012 season.

Vasylius started the 2019–2020 season with BC Šilutė in the NKL where he averaged 17.8 points and 8.3 rebounds in 4 games. He played his last game with Šilutė on 12 October 2019 and three days later he signed with Grindavík of the Icelandic Úrvalsdeild karla. In his Grindavík debut, Vasylius posted a double-double with 11 points and 10 rebounds in Grindavík's narrow loss against Haukar. He helped Grindavík to the Icelandic Cup Finals in February 2020 where it lost to Stjarnan.

After two years with BC Šilutė, he returned to Grindavík in August 2022.

== Euroleague career statistics ==
Legend
GP	Games played	GS	Games started	MPG	Minutes per game
FG%	Field-goal percentage	3P%	3-point field-goal percentage	FT%	Free-throw percentage
RPG	Rebounds per game	APG	Assists per game	SPG	Steals per game
BPG	Blocks per game	PPG	Points per game	PIR	Performance index rating
**Bold**	Career high

Year	Team	GP	GS	MPG	FG%	3P%	FT%	RPG	APG	SPG	BPG	PPG	PIR
2014–15	Neptūnas	10	1	14.8	.464	.261	.556	2.6	.8	.2	.1	6.8	5.9
Career		10	1	14.8	.464	.261	.556	2.6	.8	.2	.1	6.8	5.9
