= Anthony Cowan Jr. =

American basketball player (born 1997)

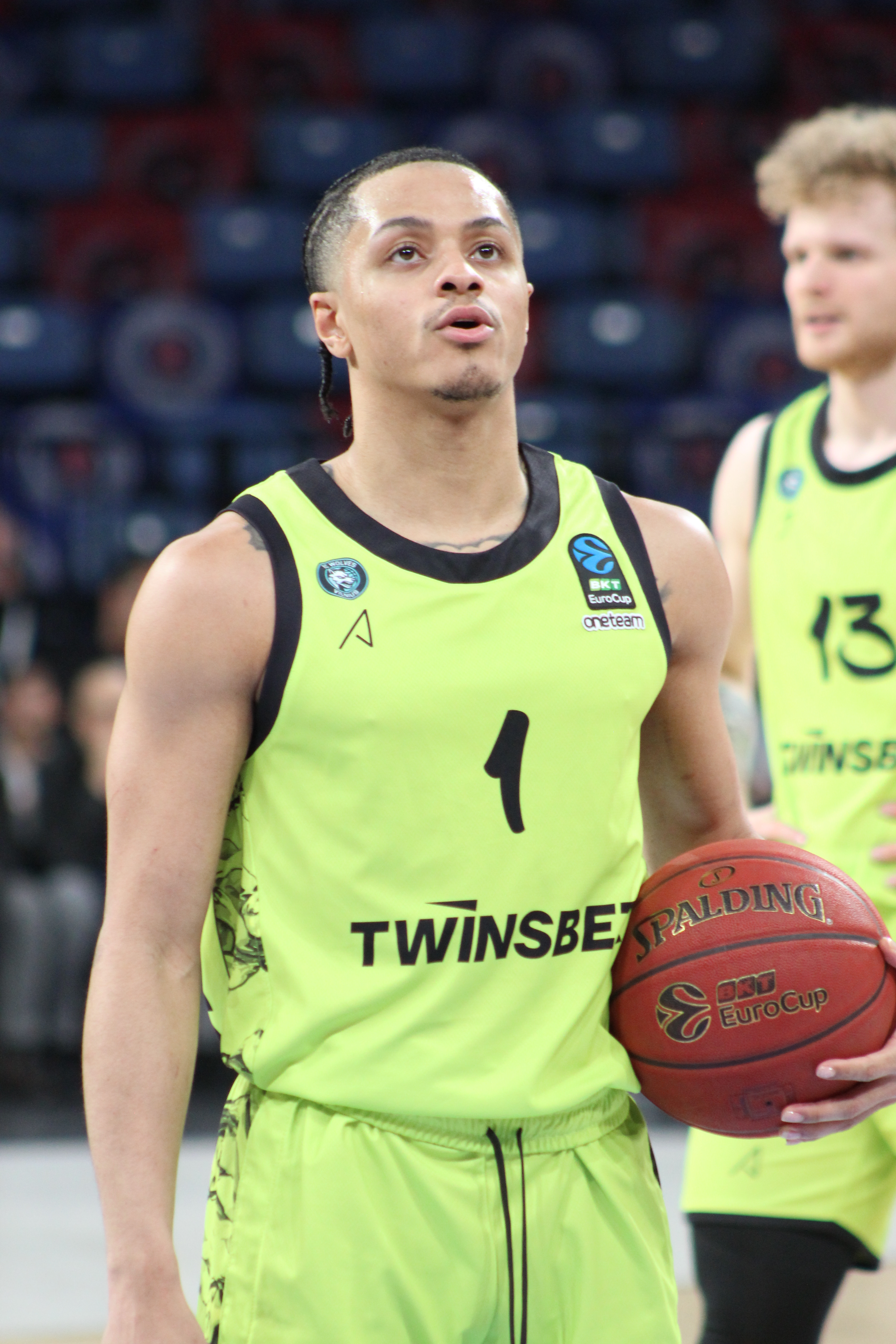
- Cowan with Wolves in 2024

No. 1 – Cedevita Olimpija
- Position: Point guard
- League: Slovenian League; ABA League; EuroCup

Personal information
- Born: October 7, 1997 (age 29) Bowie, Maryland, U.S.
- Listed height: 6 ft 0 in (1.83 m)
- Listed weight: 170 lb (77 kg)

Career information
- High school: St. John's College HS (Washington, D.C.)
- College: Maryland (2016–2020)
- NBA draft: 2020: undrafted
- Playing career: 2021–present

Career history
- 2020–2021: Memphis Hustle
- 2021–2022: Aris Thessaloniki
- 2022–2024: Promitheas Patras
- 2024–2025: Wolves Vilnius
- 2025–2026: Mersin MSK
- 2026: Piratas de Quebradillas
- 2026–present: Cedevita Olimpija

Career highlights
- LKL MVP (2025); Greek League Top Scorer (2022); Greek League assists leader (2023); First-team All-Big Ten (2020); Second-team All-Big Ten (2019); Third-team All-Big Ten (2018)
- Stats at Basketball Reference

Anthony DeWayne Cowan Jr. (born October 7, 1997) is an American professional basketball player for Cedevita Olimpija of the Slovenian League, the ABA League, and the EuroCup. He played college basketball for the Maryland Terrapins.

== High school career ==
Cowan began playing basketball at the age of seven. He attended St. John's College High School. As a senior, Cowan led St. John's to beat DeMatha Catholic High School for the Washington Catholic Athletic Conference title. He played on the D.C. Assault Amateur Athletic Union team alongside future college teammate Melo Trimble. A four-star recruit rated the No. 62 prospect in his class by Scout.com, Cowan committed to Maryland.

== College career ==
Cowan averaged 10.3 points and 3.7 assists per game as a freshman. As a sophomore, Cowan averaged 15.8 points, 5.1 assists and 4.4 rebounds per game. Cowan was named to the third-team All-Big Ten and the conference defensive team. As a junior, Cowan led the team with 15.6 points and 4.4 assists per game. He was named to the second-team All-Big Ten. He scored a season-high 27 points in a January 8, 2019 victory against Minnesota. After the season he declared for the 2019 NBA draft but ultimately withdrew and returned for his senior season.

Cowan scored a then career-high 30 points in a 76–69 victory over Temple on November 28, 2019. On December 7, Cowan made a game-tying 3-pointer in the final 20 seconds and a free throw with 2.1 seconds left to give Maryland the lead in a 59–58 victory over Illinois, finishing with 20 points, seven rebounds and six assists. Cowan set a new career high on January 31, 2020, scoring 31 points and collecting six rebounds in an 82–72 win over Iowa. At the close of the regular season, Cowan was named to the first-team All-Big Ten by the coaches and Second Team by the media. Cowan averaged 16.3 points, 4.7 assists, and 3.6 rebounds per game as a senior.

== Professional career ==
Cowan went undrafted in the 2020 NBA draft, but was selected by the Memphis Hustle with the 16th overall pick in the 2021 NBA G League draft. He averaged 6.2 points and 2.2 assists per game with the Hustle.

On September 17, 2021, Cowan signed with Aris of the Greek Basket League. In 26 games, he averaged 14.5 points, 2.8 rebounds, 5.6 assists and 1.4 steals, playing around 33 minutes per contest.

On July 19, 2022, Cowan signed a two-year deal with Promitheas Patras of the Greek Basket League and the EuroCup. In 27 domestic league matches, he averaged 11 points, 2.8 rebounds, 5.6 assists and 1.1 steals in 28 minutes per contest. On August 9, 2023, his contract option was picked up by the Greek club. Prior to the 2023–24 campaign, Cowan was named team captain by new head coach Ilias Papatheodorou.

On July 10, 2024, Cowan signed a one-year deal with Wolves Twinsbet of the Lithuanian Basketball League (LKL) and the EuroCup.

On August 1, 2025, he signed with Mersin MSK of the Basketbol Süper Ligi (BSL).

On July 7, 2026, Cowan signed a one-year deal with Cedevita Olimpija of the Slovenian League, the ABA League, and the EuroCup.

== Career statistics ==
Legend
GP	Games played	GS	Games started	MPG	Minutes per game
FG%	Field goal percentage	3P%	3-point field goal percentage	FT%	Free throw percentage
RPG	Rebounds per game	APG	Assists per game	SPG	Steals per game
BPG	Blocks per game	PPG	Points per game	**Bold**	Career high

=== College ===
Year	Team	GP	GS	MPG	FG%	3P%	FT%	RPG	APG	SPG	BPG	PPG
2016–17	Maryland	33	33	29.0	.424	.321	.769	3.9	3.7	1.2	.2	10.3
2017–18	Maryland	32	32	**37.0**	.422	**.367**	**.848**	**4.4**	**5.1**	**1.5**	**.3**	15.8
2018–19	Maryland	**34**	**34**	34.6	.393	.337	.806	3.7	4.4	.9	.2	15.6
2019–20	Maryland	31	31	34.7	.390	.322	.811	3.6	4.7	1.0	.2	**16.3**
Career		130	130	33.8	.405	.338	.811	3.9	4.5	1.1	.2	14.5

=== NBA G League ===
Year	Team	GP	GS	MPG	FG%	3P%	FT%	RPG	APG	SPG	BPG	PPG
2020–21	Memphis	15	0	15.1	.457	.412	.667	1.3	2.2	0.9	.1	6.3
Career		15	0	15.1	.457	.412	.667	1.3	2.2	0.9	.1	6.3
