= KK Perlas Vilkaviškis =

Basketball team

KK Perlas
- Leagues: National Basketball League
- Founded: 2017
- History: Perlas (2017-present)
- Arena: Vilkaviškis Sports Center
- Location: Vilkaviškis, Lithuania
- Team colors: White, orange, green
- Head coach: Kestutis Juozaitis
- Championships: RKL 2020
Home	Away

Vilkaviškis Perlas (Lithuanian: Vilkaviškio Perlas) is a professional basketball team, it is based in Vilkaviškis, Lithuania and currently competes in National Basketball League.

== Current roster ==
Note: Flags indicate national team eligibility at FIBA-sanctioned events. Players may hold other non-FIBA nationalities not displayed.

KK Perlas roster
Players
Coaches

Pos.	No.	Nat.	Name	Ht.	Wt.	Age
PG	0	(Lithuania)	Galinskas, Nojus	1.82 m (6 ft 0 in)	74 kg (163 lb)	17 – 20 February 2008
PG	2	(Lithuania)	Kernagis, Adas	1.90 m (6 ft 3 in)	80 kg (176 lb)	15 – 10 March 2010
SG	3	(Lithuania)	Čiuplys, Tomas	1.93 m (6 ft 4 in)	74 kg (163 lb)	17 – 13 October 2008
PG	5	(Lithuania)	Pažarauskas, Titas	1.92 m (6 ft 4 in)	78 kg (172 lb)	22 – 6 April 2003
SG	9	(Lithuania)	Smirnov, Kristupas	1.96 m (6 ft 5 in)	90 kg (198 lb)	19 – 25 March 2006
PF	13	(Lithuania)	Buškevičius, Aurimas	2.03 m (6 ft 8 in)	97 kg (214 lb)	21 – 23 January 2004
SF	16	(Lithuania)	Sankūnas, Simas	1.94 m (6 ft 4 in)	74 kg (163 lb)	17 – 16 October 2008
PG	19	(Lithuania)	Žukauskas, Mantvydas	1.93 m (6 ft 4 in)	93 kg (205 lb)	27 – 19 October 1998
SF	21	(United States)	Gadsden Jr, Theodore Kieth	1.99 m (6 ft 6 in)	95 kg (209 lb)	23 – 18 February 2002
C	22	(Lithuania)	Meištas, Vytautas	2.05 m (6 ft 9 in)	113 kg (249 lb)	23 – 28 February 2002
SG	23	(United States)	Saterfield, Jorell	1.96 m (6 ft 5 in)	91 kg (201 lb)	24 – 13 February 2001
C	33	(United States)	Quillan, Gabriel	2.04 m (6 ft 8 in)	99 kg (218 lb)	23 – 15 September 2002
PF	34	(Lithuania)	Stankevičius, Giedrius	2.07 m (6 ft 9 in)	95 kg (209 lb)	29 – 29 July 1996
G	35	(Lithuania)	Kučinskas, Gustas	1.88 m (6 ft 2 in)	77 kg (170 lb)	19 – 14 April 2006
PF	50	(Lithuania)	Skučas, Žygimantas	2.02 m (6 ft 8 in)	103 kg (227 lb)	33 – 18 March 1992
SG	77	(Lithuania)	Chadatavičius, Laurynas	1.90 m (6 ft 3 in)	76 kg (168 lb)	16 – 7 March 2009

Head coach

- (Lithuania) Šarūnas Zablockis

Assistant coach(es)

- (Lithuania) Kostas Damijonaitis

Athletic trainer(s)

- (Lithuania) Guoda Marmaitė

Physiotherapist(s)

- (Lithuania) Tadas Mikelionis

Legend

- (C) Team captain
- Injured

- Roster
Updated: 27 November 2025

== Club achievements ==
- 2019–20 season: RKL 1st place
- 2020–21 season: NKL 9th place
- 2021–22 season: NKL 7th place
- 2022–23 season: NKL 11th place
- 2023–24 season: NKL 6th place
- 2024–25 season: NKL 2nd place
