= Žygimantas Skučas =

Lithuanian basketball player (born 1992)

KK Perlas Vilkaviškis
- Position: Power forward
- League: National Basketball League

Personal information
- Born: 18 March 1992 (age 34) Kaunas, Lithuania
- Listed height: 6 ft 7.5 in (2.02 m)
- Listed weight: 228 lb (103 kg)

Career information
- NBA draft: 2014: undrafted
- Playing career: 2012–present

Career history
- 2010–2012: Žalgiris-2 Kaunas
- 2012–2014: LSU-Atletas Kaunas
- 2014–2016: Pieno žvaigždės Pasvalys
- 2016–2018: Lietkabelis Panevėžys
- 2018: BC Gries Oberhoffen
- 2018–2019: Pieno žvaigždės Pasvalys
- 2019–2021: Juventus Utena
- 2021–2022: Pieno žvaigždės Pasvalys
- 2022–2025: Juventus Utena
- 2025–present: KK Perlas Vilkaviškis
Medals
Men's basketball
Representing Lithuania
FIBA Europe Under-20 Championship
Gold medal – first place	2012 Slovenia	U-20 Team
FIBA World Under-19 Championship
Gold medal – first place	2011 Latvia	U-19 Team
FIBA Europe Under-18 Championship
Gold medal – first place	2010 Lithuania	U-18 Team

Žygimantas Skučas (born 18 March 1992, Kaunas, Lithuania) is a Lithuanian professional basketball player for KK Perlas Vilkaviškis of the National Basketball League (NKL). His main position is power forward.

== Professional career ==
In 2016, he signed with Lietkabelis Panevėžys and debuted in a European competition during the EuroCup on 12 October against KK MZT Skopje, scoring 15 points, grabbing 4 rebounds and helping his team to start the season with a 90–89 victory. The team also qualified into the TOP16 stage and Skučas finished the debut season with solid 9.2 points, 3.9 rebounds and 1.7 assists averages.

== International career ==
He won four gold medals with Lithuania national teams: Europe U-16 in 2008, Europe U-18 in 2010, World U-19 in 2011 and Europe U-20 in 2012.
