= BC Kuršiai =

Kuršiai
- Leagues: National Basketball League
- Founded: 2018
- Dissolved: 2023
- History: Kuršiai (2018–2023)
- Arena: Palanga Arena
- Capacity: 1,500
- Location: Palanga, Lithuania
- Team colors: Blue, and white
- Website: bckursiai.lt
Home

Palangos Kuršiai was a Lithuanian professional basketball club based in Palanga. The team played in the National Basketball League. The club was bought by Gedvydas Vainauskas and Jonas Vainauskas in June 2023, who formed new basketball club BC Olimpas Palanga.
