= Joseph Girard III =

American basketball player (born 2000)

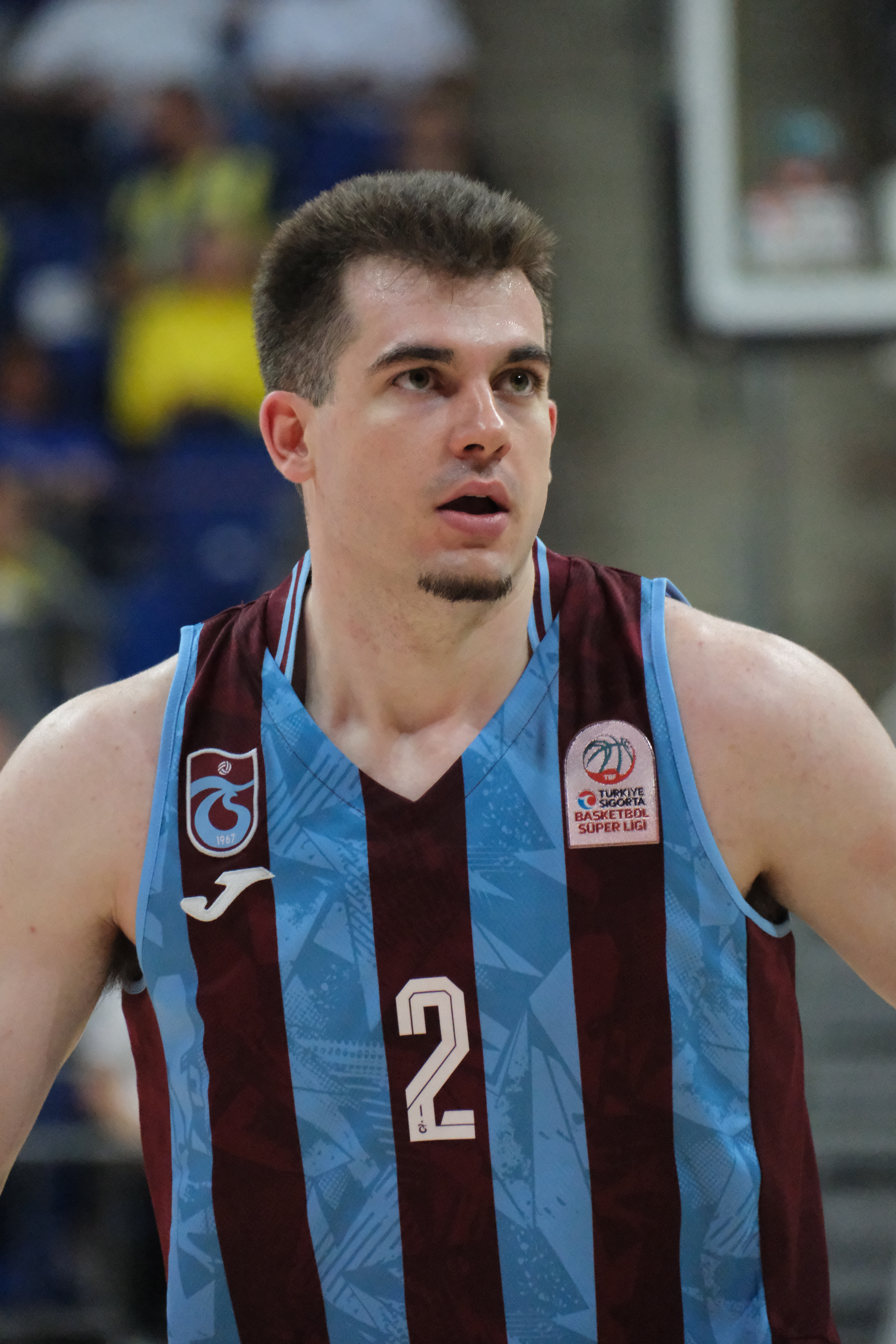
- Girard with Trabzonspor in 2026

No. 3 – Dziki Warsaw
- Position: Point guard
- League: PLK

Personal information
- Born: November 27, 2000 (age 25) Glens Falls, New York, U.S.
- Listed height: 6 ft 1 in (1.85 m)
- Listed weight: 190 lb (86 kg)

Career information
- High school: Glens Falls (Glens Falls, New York)
- College: Syracuse (2019–2023); Clemson (2023–2024)
- NBA draft: 2024: undrafted
- Playing career: 2024–present

Career history
- 2024–2025: Nevėžis Kėdainiai
- 2025–2026: Cedevita Olimpija
- 2026: Trabzonspor
- 2026–present: Dziki Warsaw

Career highlights
- LKL Top Scorer (2025); Mr. New York Basketball (2019)

Joseph Girard III (born November 27, 2000) is an American professional basketball player for Dziki Warsaw of the Polish Basketball League (PLK). He played for Glens Falls High School in New York, where he became the state's all-time leading scorer. As a senior in high school, Girard earned Mr. New York Basketball honors and was named MaxPreps Athlete of the Year for his success in basketball and football.

== Early life ==
Girard was born and grew up in Glens Falls, New York, and began playing basketball at a young age. In fifth grade, he won a national foul shooting contest by making all 25 shots and was dubbed "the next Jimmer", a reference to Glens Falls native Jimmer Fredette. Girard attended Glens Falls High School, where he played basketball and football as well as junior varsity baseball, which he gave up to focus on the other two sports.

Girard began playing varsity basketball, coached by his uncle Rob Girard, for the Indians while still in eighth grade, averaging 21.7 points per game. As a freshman, he averaged 33.9 points per game and made 122 three-pointers and began to be recruited by colleges. As a sophomore, Girard averaged 36.4 points per game and finished the season with 2,157 career points in leading the team to a 24–1 record. As a junior, Girard averaged 50.0 points per game and passed Lance Stephenson's state record of 2,946 career points scored. He was named the New York Gatorade Player of the Year, the All-USA New York Player of the Year, and the Albany Times Union Male Athlete of the Year.

As a senior, Girard averaged 48.6 points per game and led Glens Falls to its first New York Federation title, scoring 53 points in the championship game and finishing his high school career with 4,763 points. Girard was again named the New York Gatorade Player of the Year as well as the NYSSWA Class B Player of the Year and Mr. New York Basketball and was named Class B first team All-State for a fourth consecutive season and was named the MaxPreps Athlete of the Year for his combined success in basketball and football. Rated a three star prospect, Girard committed to play college basketball at Syracuse over offers from Boston College, Duke, Michigan, Notre Dame and Penn State.

In football, Girard served as Glens Falls' starting quarterback and safety while also returning kicks and punts. Girard led Glens Falls to the Class B state title as a sophomore and was named the MVP of the State Championship Game. He passed for 1,911 yards and 24 touchdowns and led Glens Falls to a 13–1 record in his junior season. As a senior, he passed for 3,078 yards and 36 touchdowns and led the Indians to a second state title. Girard finished his high school football career with 6,767 passing yards and 83 touchdowns while rushing for more than 1,500 yards and 31 touchdowns. Although he stated in intent to pursue basketball in college, Girard received a scholarship offer to play both sports at Tulane and to play football at UMass while also receiving recruiting interest from Indiana, Wake Forest, Syracuse, UConn, and Monmouth.

== College career ==
Girard was named the Orange's starting point guard two games into his true freshman season. In his first career start against Seattle, he scored 24 points with five rebounds and two assists in an 89–67 win. On December 18, Girard scored 20 points and had seven assists in a 74–62 win over Oakland. Girard scored a career-high 30 points in a 79–74 loss to NC State on February 11, 2020. He averaged 12.4 points per game and led Syracuse in assists (3.5 per game) and steals (1.4 per game). He shot 89.4 percent from the foul line, third best in school history behind Gerry McNamara's freshman and senior seasons, and made 70 three-pointers, fourth highest for a Syracuse freshman. As a sophomore, Girard averaged 9.8 points and 3.5 assists per game. After the NCAA passed the Name, Image and Likeness rules in July 2021, he formed JG3 Enterprises LLC. As a senior, Girard averaged 16.4 points per game. He transferred to Clemson for his final season of eligibility.

== Professional career ==
On 24 July 2024, Girard started his professional career and signed a one-year contract with Nevėžis Kėdainiai of the Lithuanian Basketball League (LKL).

On March 15, 2026, he signed with Trabzonspor of the Basketbol Süper Ligi (BSL).

On July 16, 2026, he signed with Dziki Warsaw of the Polish Basketball League (PLK).

== Career statistics ==
Legend
GP	Games played	GS	Games started	MPG	Minutes per game
FG%	Field goal percentage	3P%	3-point field goal percentage	FT%	Free throw percentage
RPG	Rebounds per game	APG	Assists per game	SPG	Steals per game
BPG	Blocks per game	PPG	Points per game	**Bold**	Career high

=== College ===
Year	Team	GP	GS	MPG	FG%	3P%	FT%	RPG	APG	SPG	BPG	PPG
2019–20	Syracuse	32	30	33.0	.348	.324	.894	3.0	3.5	1.5	**.1**	12.4
2020–21	Syracuse	28	28	27.7	.355	.333	.780	2.9	3.5	1.4	**.1**	9.8
2021–22	Syracuse	33	33	34.1	.392	.403	.882	2.6	**4.2**	**1.6**	.0	13.8
2022–23	Syracuse	32	32	**34.7**	.403	.381	.857	2.8	3.0	.8	.0	**16.4**
2023–24	Clemson	**36**	**36**	32.8	**.430**	**.413**	**.935**	**3.2**	2.9	.6	**.1**	15.1
Career		161	159	32.6	.389	.375	.882	3.0	3.4	1.2	.1	13.6

== Personal life ==
Girard's father, Joe Jr., played basketball at Le Moyne College under former Michigan head coach John Beilein. Joe Girard grew up in Glens Falls, New York.
