= Kęstutis Kemzūra =

Lithuanian basketball player and coach

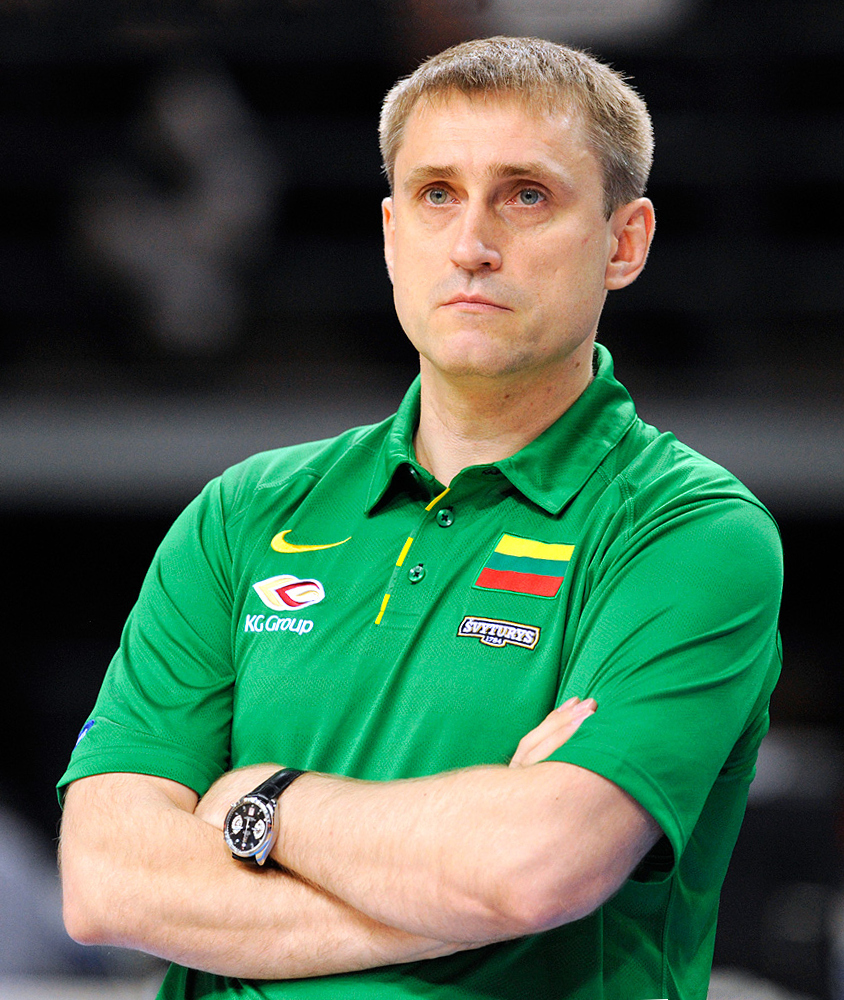
- Kęstutis Kemzūra, while coaching Lithuania's national team, at EuroBasket 2011

Personal information
- Born: 20 April 1970 (age 56) Kaunas, Lithuania
- Listed height: 1.91 m (6 ft 3 in)
- Listed weight: 91 kg (201 lb)

Career information
- Playing career: 1992–2001
- Position: Point guard
- Coaching career: 2001–present

Career history

Playing
- 1992–1996: Atletas Kaunas
- 1996–1998: Šilutė
- 1998–1999: Lietuvos rytas Vilnius
- 1999–2000: Kalnapilis Panevėžys / Sema Panevėžys
- 2000–2001: Swans Gmunden

Coaching
- 2001–2002: Beşiktaş (assistant)
- 2002–2004: Lietuvos rytas Vilnius (assistant)
- 2004: Lietuvos rytas Vilnius
- 2004–2005: Dynamo Saint Petersburg (assistant)
- 2005–2006: Lithuania (assistant)
- 2005–2007: Benetton Treviso (assistant)
- 2007–2008: Khimki
- 2008–2009: Latvia
- 2009–2011: Lokomotiv Kuban
- 2009–2012: Lithuania
- 2012: Asseco Prokom Gdynia
- 2013–2015: ČEZ Nymburk
- 2016–2017: Austria
- 2016–2018: Darüşşafaka (assistant)
- 2018–2019: Olympiacos (assistant)
- 2019–2020: Olympiacos
- 2020–2021: Petkim Spor
- 2021–2023: Lithuania (assistant)
- 2023–2024: BC Wolves
- 2024–2026: Juventus Utena

Career highlights
- As head coach: Russian Cup winner (2008); 2× Czech League champion (2014, 2015); Czech Cup winner (2014); As assistant coach: EuroCup champion (2018); FIBA Europe League champion (2005); Italian League champion (2006)
Medals
Men's basketball Head coach
Representing Lithuania
FIBA World Cup
| Bronze medal – third place | Turkey 2010 |

Kęstutis Kemzūra (born 20 April 1970) is a Lithuanian professional basketball coach and former player who was last the head coach of Juventus Utena of the Lithuanian Basketball League. During his playing career, at a height of 1.91 m (6 ft 3 in) tall, he played at the point guard position.

== Professional playing career ==
Kemzūra started his club playing career as a point guard, with the Lithuanian club Atletas Kaunas. He averaged 6.5 points, 2.5 rebounds and 1 assist per game in the FIBA Saporta Cup competition's 1992–93 season, in his first year. His next year he had better stats, as he recorded 12.5 points, 2 rebounds and 3 assists per game in the Saporta Cup's 1993–94 season.

In 1996, he moved to the Lithuanian club Šilutė. After that, he went to the Lithuanian club Lietuvos Rytas Vilnius, for the 1998–99 season, where he became a player coach. Kemzūra left the team in November, and joined the Lithuanian club Kalnapilis Panevėžys. In the 1999–2000 season, he played in the FIBA Korać Cup competition with Sema Panevėžys. His last playing season was the 2000–01 season, in which he played with the Austrian club Swans Gmunden.

== National team playing career ==
Kemzūra also briefly played with the senior Lithuanian national basketball team in 1994. He played with Lithuania at the qualification tournament for the EuroBasket 1995.

== Club coaching career ==
After finishing his basketball playing career with the Swans Gmunden, Kemzūra pursued a basketball coaching career. During the 2001–02 season, he was hired by the Turkish club Beşiktaş, as an assistant coach. The following year, he moved to the Lithuanian club Lietuvos Rytas Vilnius, where he first worked as an assistant coach, and then later as a head coach.

He spent the next three years working as an assistant coach with the Russian club Dynamo Saint Petersburg, and the Italian club Benetton Treviso. In 2007, Kemzūra became the head coach of the Russian club Khimki Moscow Region. He was replaced in that role by Sergio Scariolo, in December 2008.

In December 2009, he signed to be the head coach of the Russian club Lokomotiv Kuban Krasnodar. In 2011, he was chosen to become the foreign players' coach during the Russian All-Star Game. Kemzūra left the team in 2011.

Kemzūra then signed a contract to be the head coach of the Polish club Asseco Prokom Gdynia, in July 2012. He left Prokom in December 2012. In June 2013, he became the head coach of the Czech club ČEZ Basketball Nymburk.

In December 2016, he became an assistant coach of the Turkish EuroLeague side Darüşşafaka, after Ainars Bagatskis' decision to leave the team. On 3 July 2018 Kemzūra was named an assistant coach of the Greek club Olympiacos, where he would work in that role under the club's head coach David Blatt. On 6 October 2019, Blatt resigned, and Kemzūra became the temporary interim head coach of the team.

Kemzūra debuted as the interim head coach of Olympiacos, on 11 October 2019, and coached Olympiacos to a crushing 89–63 victory versus the Spanish club Valencia Basket. On 20 October 2019 Olympiacos announced that Kemzūra would remain as the head coach of the team, until the end of the 2019–20 season. Poor results, however, lead to Olympiakos firing Kemzūra, and was replaced by Georgios Bartzokas

On 28 March 2023, Kemzūra was appointed as head coach of the newly established Lithuanian club BC Wolves. On 21 January 2024, Kemzūra parted ways with the club after failing to qualify for the EuroCup playoffs.

== National team coaching career ==
=== Lithuanian national team ===
At the EuroBasket 2005 and 2006 FIBA World Championship, Kemzūra served as an assistant coach with the senior Lithuanian national team. On 5 November 2009, Kemzūra became the head coach of Lithuania. Under Kemzūra, Lithuania won the bronze medal at the 2010 FIBA World Championship. He also coached the team to a 5th-place finish at the EuroBasket 2011, and to an 8th-place finish at the 2012 Summer Olympics. In October 2012, he was replaced as head coach by Jonas Kazlauskas. In October 2021, Kemzūra returned to the team as an assistant coach under Kazys Maksvytis. He left the position in June 2023.

=== Latvian national team ===
On 19 December 2008, Kemzūra was appointed as the head coach for Latvia. His team finished in 13th place at the EuroBasket 2009. After that, he declined to extend his contract with the team, and instead opted to become the head coach of the senior Lithuanian national basketball team.

=== Austria national team ===
On 29 January 2016, Kemzūra became the head coach of Austria, and he coached them at the EuroBasket 2017 qualification. Despite Austria's failed attempt to qualify for EuroBasket 2017, his contract was extended at the end of the year.

== Awards and achievements ==
=== Head coach ===
- 2010 FIBA World Championship, Turkey: Bronze
