= BC Žalgiris-2 =

Žalgiris-2
- Nickname: Žalgirio dubleriai
- Leagues: National Basketball League
- Founded: 1999
- History: LKKA-Žalgiris (1999–2003); Žalgiris-Arvydas Sabonis school (2003–2012); Žalgiris-2 (2012–present)
- Arena: Žalgiris training center
- Capacity: 500
- Location: Kaunas, Lithuania
- Team colors: Green, white
- Head coach: Kaspars Vecvagars
- Affiliation: Žalgiris Kaunas
- Championships: NKL: 2 LKAL: 1
- Website: zalgiris.lt
Home	Away

BC Žalgiris-2 is the reserve team of the professional basketball club Žalgiris Kaunas. Founded as LKKA-Žalgiris in 1999, the team competes in the National Basketball League (NKL), the second division of Lithuanian basketball. The team plays its home games at the Žalgiris training center in Kaunas. They have won the EuroLeague Junior Tournament three times, in 2003, 2007 and 2025.

== Titles ==
- Junior EuroLeague Champion: 2003, 2007, 2025
- NKL Champion: 2008, 2023
- NKL Runner-up: 2016, 2018
- NKL Third place: 2012, 2013,2025
- LKAL Champion: 2003
- Runner-up of Junior EuroLeague: 2005, 2006, 2011
- LKAL Bronze Medal Winner: 2000, 2002

== Roster ==
Žalgiris-2 roster
Players
Coaches

Pos.	No.	Nat.	Name	Ht.	Wt.	Age
PG	3	(Lithuania)	Stenionis, Dominykas	1.79 m (5 ft 10 in)	72 kg (159 lb)	24 – 3 July 2002
F	5	(Lithuania)	Nemeikša, Gytis	1.99 m (6 ft 6 in)	85 kg (187 lb)	25 – 17 September 2001
G	7	(Lithuania)	Sargiūnas, Titas	1.90 m (6 ft 3 in)	78 kg (172 lb)	23 – 26 March 2003
PG	9	(Lithuania)	Kneižys, Radvilas	1.92 m (6 ft 4 in)	72 kg (159 lb)	23 – 23 January 2003
F	11	(Lithuania)	Repšys, Matas	2.03 m (6 ft 8 in)	84 kg (185 lb)	24 – 28 January 2002
C	15	(Lithuania)	Tamulevičius, Martynas	2.05 m (6 ft 9 in)	95 kg (209 lb)	24 – 2 October 2002
PG	17	(Lithuania)	Rubštavičius, Mantas	1.93 m (6 ft 4 in)	70 kg (154 lb)	24 – 6 May 2002
C	21	(Lithuania)	Jaruševičius, Ugnius	2.05 m (6 ft 9 in)	93 kg (205 lb)	23 – 4 June 2003
PF	23	(Lithuania)	Murauskas, Paulius	2.04 m (6 ft 8 in)	100 kg (220 lb)	22 – 14 February 2004
PG	42	(Lithuania)	Lelevičius, Liutauras	1.97 m (6 ft 6 in)	78 kg (172 lb)	23 – 28 May 2003

Head coach

- (Latvia) Kaspars Vecvagars

Assistant coach(es)

- (Lithuania) Darius Sirtautas

Athletic trainer(s)

- (Lithuania) Domantas Tautkus

Physiotherapist(s)

- (Lithuania) Romas Petraitis

Team manager

- (Lithuania) Gediminas Navickas

Legend

- (C) Team captain
- Injured

- Roster
Updated: 2020-09-23

== Notable players ==
Note: Flags indicate national team eligibility at FIBA-sanctioned events. Players may hold other non-FIBA nationalities not displayed.

Criteria

To appear in this section a player must have either:

- Set a club record or won an individual award while at the club
- Played at least one official international match for their national team at any time
- Played at least one official NBA match at any time.

Highest achievements are noted at the top:

NBA

- (Lithuania) Martynas Andriuškevičius 2003–2004
- (Lithuania) Donatas Motiejūnas 2005–2007

LKL

- (Lithuania) Valdas Dabkus 2001–2002
- (Lithuania) Vytenis Jasikevičius 2013–2014
- (Lithuania) Vaidas Čepukaitis 2007–2008; 2010-2011
- (Lithuania) Tauras Jogėla 2008–2012
- (Lithuania) Gediminas Maceina 2002–2004
- (Lithuania) Žygimantas Skučas 2010–2012

EuroLeague

- (Lithuania) Povilas Butkevičius 2004–2006
- (Lithuania) Vytenis Čižauskas 2007–2008, 2010–2011
- (Lithuania) Vilmantas Dilys 2003–2005, 2007–2008
- (Lithuania) Tomas Dimša 2011–2013
- (Lithuania) Artūras Gudaitis 2012–2013
- (Lithuania) Giedrius Gustas 1999–2000
- (Lithuania) Žygimantas Janavičius 2007–2008
- (Lithuania) Paulius Jankūnas 2002–2003
- (Lithuania) Adas Juškevičius 2005–2008
- (Lithuania) Mantas Kalnietis 2003–2006
- (Lithuania) Mindaugas Kupšas 2010–2011
- (Lithuania) Vytenis Lipkevičius 2006–2008
- (Lithuania) Jonas Mačiulis 2002–2004
- (Lithuania) Artūras Milaknis 2006–2007
- (Lithuania) Darius Šilinskis 2000–2002
- (Serbia) Vladimir Štimac 2005–2006, 2007
- (Estonia) Siim-Sander Vene 2006–2008
- (Latvia) Kaspars Vecvagars 2010–2011
- (Lithuania) Justas Tamulis 2011–2014
- (Lithuania) Lukas Lekavičius 2012–2014
- (Lithuania) Donatas Tarolis 2013–2014
- (Lithuania) Vaidas Kariniauskas 2010–2013
- (Lithuania) Edgaras Ulanovas 2010–2011
- (Lithuania) Marius Grigonis 2009–2013
- (Lithuania) Rokas Jokubaitis 2016–2019
