= Gedvydas Vainauskas =

Lithuanian journalist and publisher (born 1955)

- Born: November 7, 1955 (age 70); Utena, Lithuanian SSR, Soviet Union
- Education: Vilnius University
- Spouse(s): Bronė Vainauskienė (divorced in 2013); Liuminata Vainauskienė (2014-2024)
- Children: Jonas Vainauskas

Gedvydas Vainauskas (born November 7, 1955) is a Lithuanian journalist, publishing company Lietuvos rytas Chief Editor, shareholder, founder and former BC Lietuvos rytas president.

== Biography ==
Vainauskas graduated Kaunas 4th High School. Following it, he gained a journalism degree in Vilnius University in 1979.

Vainauskas is the largest shares holder of Lietuvos rytas (25,5 % in 2009), founder and former president of BC Lietuvos rytas for 20 years from 1997 to 2017. He resigned from the basketball club president post after international racism scandal in 2017.

== Personal life ==
Vainauskas has a son Jonas Vainauskas with his first wife Bronė Vainauskienė. They have divorced in 2013. In 2014, he married his second wife Liuminata Mickutė during wedding ceremony which was held in Venice, Italy.

== Decorations ==
- 2000: Commander's Cross of the Order of the Lithuanian Grand Duke Gediminas (by president Valdas Adamkus decree)
