= LKAL =

Former Lithuanian basketball league

Lietuvos Krepšinio A Lyga (LKAL)
- Sport: Basketball
- Founded: 1994
- Ceased: Spring of 2005
- No. of teams: -
- Country: Lithuania
- Last champion(s): BC Šilutė

LKAL - Lietuvos Krepšinio A Lyga (English: Lithuanian Basketball A League) was the second tier Lithuanian basketball league. It was established in 1994 and was active until it ceased to exist in the spring of 2005.

The newly created league named NKL, Nacionalinė Krepšinio Lyga (National Basketball League), replaced LKAL as the second tier Lithuanian basketball league.

The prime Lithuanian basketball league during the LKAL existence was and still is the Lietuvos krepšinio lyga (Lithuanian Basketball League).

== Champions ==
Season	Champion	Vice Champion	Third Place
2004–2005	Šilutės „Šilutė“	Jonavos „SK“	Vilniaus „KK Akademija“
2003–2004	Joniškio „Žiemgala“	Pakruojo „Merseta“	Jonavos „SK“
2002–2003	Kauno „LKKA-Žalgiris“	Šilutės „Šilutė“	Prienų „Rūdupis“
2001–2002	-	-	Kauno „LKKA-Žalgiris“
2000–2001	Mažeikių „Nafta“	Anykščių „Puntukas“	-
1999–2000	-	-	Kauno „LKKA-Žalgiris“
