= BC Telšiai =

Telšiai
- Leagues: National Basketball League
- Founded: 2012
- History: Telšiai (2012-present)
- Arena: Telšiai Arena
- Location: Telšiai, Lithuania
- Team colors: White, green
- Head coach: (Latvia) Sandis Buškevics
- Championships: 1 RKL Champions (2015); 1 NKL Champions (2025)
- Website: http://telsiukrepsinis.lt/
Home	Away

BC Telšiai is a professional Telšiai, Lithuania basketball club, currently playing in National Basketball League.

== Team roster ==
BC Telšiai roster
Players
Coaches

Pos.	No.	Nat.	Name	Ht.	Wt.	Age
F/C	1	(Lithuania)	Kaminskis, Ovidijus	1.95 m (6 ft 5 in)	100 kg (220 lb)	34 – 5 March 1991
PG	3	(Lithuania)	Razutis, Ignas	1.85 m (6 ft 1 in)	84 kg (185 lb)	38 – 14 March 1987
G	5	(Lithuania)	Leinartas, Benas	1.96 m (6 ft 5 in)	75 kg (165 lb)	19 – 20 June 2006
F	6	(Lithuania)	Pocius, Vilius	1.96 m (6 ft 5 in)	98 kg (216 lb)	30 – 26 July 1995
F	9	(Lithuania)	Leinartas, Titas	2.00 m (6 ft 7 in)	78 kg (172 lb)	19 – 20 June 2006
G	13	(Lithuania)	Gecevičius, Martynas	1.93 m (6 ft 4 in)	97 kg (214 lb)	37 – 16 May 1988
F/C	14	(Lithuania)	Jakštas, Rolandas	2.03 m (6 ft 8 in)	105 kg (231 lb)	32 – 28 September 1992
F	22	(Lithuania)	Rasys, Deividas	1.97 m (6 ft 6 in)	95 kg (209 lb)	27 – 22 September 1997
G	90	(Lithuania)	Kaveckis, Laurynas	1.90 m (6 ft 3 in)	89 kg (196 lb)	35 – 2 July 1990
G		(Lithuania)	Rimkus, Arūnas	1.94 m (6 ft 4 in)	88 kg (194 lb)	21 – 16 July 2004

Head coach

- (Latvia) Sandis Buškevics

Assistant coach(es)

- (Lithuania) Audrius Maneikis

Athletic trainer(s)

- (Lithuania) Gytis Krivickas

Physiotherapist

- (Lithuania) Patricija Biečiūtė

Legend

- (C) Team captain
- Injured

- Roster
Updated: 07-02-2025

=== Depth chart ===
Pos.	Starting 5	Bench
C	Rolandas Jakštas	Titas Leinartas
PF	Ovidijus Kaminskis	Deividas Rasys
SF	Vilius Pocius	Benas Leinartas
SG	Martynas Gecevičius	Laurynas Kaveckis
PG	Ignas Razutis	Arūnas Rimkus

=== Squad changes for/during the 2025–26 season ===
==== In ====
No.	Pos.	Nat.	Name	Moving from	
	G	(Lithuania)	Arūnas Rimkus	BC Rytas-2	(Lithuania)

==== Out ====
No.	Pos.	Nat.	Name	Moving to
12	G/F	(Lithuania)	Gediminas Leščiauskas	CEP Lorient
7	F/C	(Lithuania)	Lukas Valantinas	BC Nevėžis
0	PG	(Lithuania)	Nojus Radžius	BC Lietkabelis

== Season by season ==
Season	Tier	League	Pos.	KMT Cup
2012–13	3	RKL	4th	
2013–14	3	RKL	3rd	
2014–15	2	RKL	1st	
2015–16	2	NKL	Round of 16	
2016–17	2	NKL	Quarterfinals	
2017–18	2	NKL	Round of 16	
2018–19	2	NKL	3rd	
2019–20	2	NKL	–^{1}	First round
2020–21	2	NKL	2nd	
2021–22	2	NKL	3rd	
2022–23	2	NKL	3rd	
2023–24	2	NKL	Quarterfinals	
2024–25	2	NKL	1st	

^1 Cancelled due to the COVID-19 pandemic in Europe.
