= BC Mažeikiai =

M Basket Mažeikiai
- Leagues: National Basketball League
- Founded: 2005
- History: Mažeikiai (2005–2017); Ereliai (2017–2021); Mažeikiai (2021–2022); M Basket (2022–present)
- Arena: Telšiai Arena
- Capacity: 1,000
- Location: Mažeikiai, Lithuania
- Team colors: Red, white
- Head coach: Marius Kiltinavičius
- Championships: 2 NKL (2013, 2014); 1 RKL (2006)
- Website: mbasket.lt
Home	Away

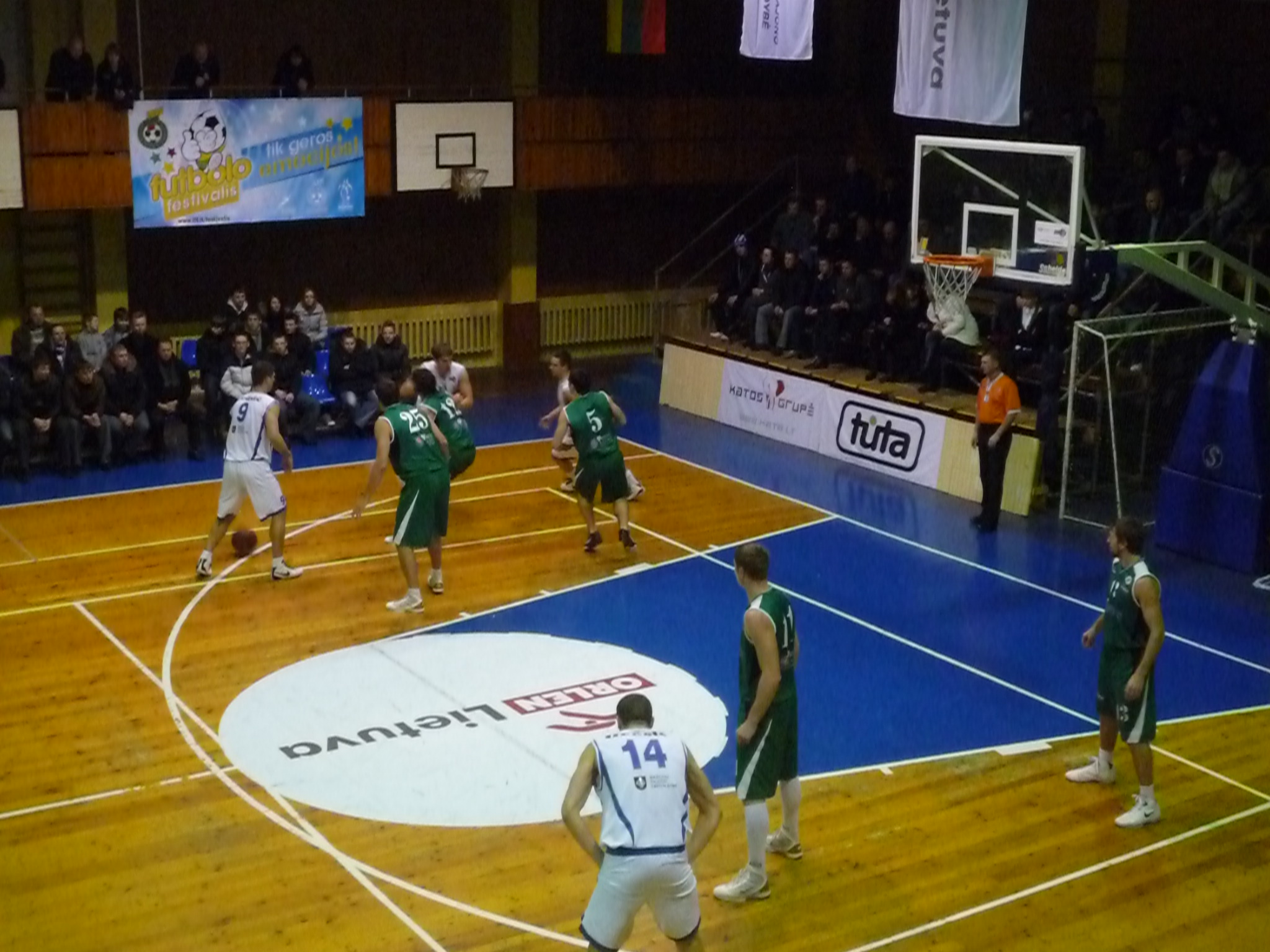
Mažeikiai in a match versus Rūdupis Prienai in 2010.

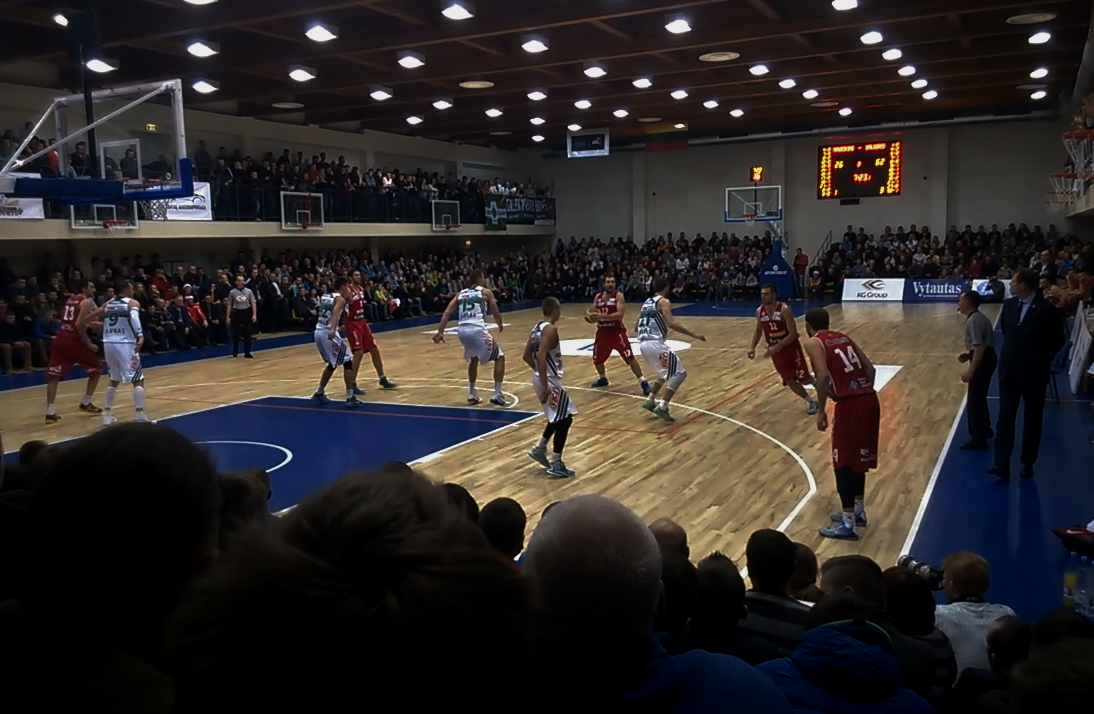
Mažeikiai playing a LKL game versus Žalgiris Kaunas in 2014.

M Basket Mažeikiai (Lithuanian: Mažeikių M Basket), also known as M Basket-Delamode Mažeikiai for sponsorship reasons, is a professional basketball club based in Mažeikiai, Lithuania. The club finished as a runner-up in the 2022–23 National Basketball League season, which was enough for the promotion to the Lithuanian Basketball League for the 2023–24 season.

== History ==
BC Mažeikiai was founded in 2005 by Mažeikiai government and various businessmen. In 2013, Mažeikiai finished as champions of the National Basketball League and consequently should have been promoted to LKL, the top basketball league in Lithuania. However Mažeikiai had to stay in NKL because they do not have LKL arena–passing requirements, winning a second NKL title. They debuted in the LKL in 2014. They were relegated back to the NKL next season after a disastrous season. They returned to the LKL for the 2023-2024 season, but this stay would only last two seasons as they were relegated back to the NKL for the 2025-26 season.

== Current roster ==
M Basket Mažeikiai roster
Players
Coaches

Pos.	No.	Nat.	Name	Ht.	Wt.	Age
G	0	(Lithuania)	Valunta, Šarūnas	1.90 m (6 ft 3 in)	90 kg (198 lb)	25 – 25 July 2000
G	3	(Lithuania)	Pocevičius, Tadas	1.91 m (6 ft 3 in)	79 kg (174 lb)	19 – 16 January 2007
PG	8	(Lithuania)	Sabeckis, Donatas	1.98 m (6 ft 6 in)	95 kg (209 lb)	33 – 30 December 1992
SF	10	(Lithuania)	Urkis, Amandas	2.00 m (6 ft 7 in)	98 kg (216 lb)	27 – 10 January 1999
G	25	(Lithuania)	Urbaitis, Domas	1.90 m (6 ft 3 in)	75 kg (165 lb)	16 – 8 August 2009
SF	30	(Lithuania)	Švažas, Mantas	1.99 m (6 ft 6 in)	77 kg (170 lb)	19 – 20 February 2007
G	77	(Lithuania)	Leščiauskas, Kristupas	1.91 m (6 ft 3 in)	85 kg (187 lb)	20 – 6 June 2005

Head coach

- (Lithuania) Marius Kiltinavičius

Assistant coach(es)

- (Lithuania) Rimantas Grigas
- (Lithuania) Mindaugas Motuzas

Athletic trainer(s)

- (Lithuania) Dovydas Daubaris

Legend

- (C) Team captain
- Injured

- Roster
Updated: January 6, 2025

=== Depth chart ===
Pos.	Starting 5	Bench 1	Reserve	Inactive
C
PF
SF		Amandas Urkis	Mantas Švažas
SG	Šarūnas Valunta		Tadas Pocevičius
PG		Kristupas Leščiauskas	Domas Urbaitis	Donatas Sabeckis

=== In ===
No.	Pos.	Nat.	Name	Moving from

=== Out ===
No.	Pos.	Nat.	Name	Moving to	
27	F/C	(Lithuania)	Tomas Zdanavičius	SCM U Craiova	(Romania)
22	PG	(Lithuania)	Vytenis Čižauskas	Legnano Basket Knights	(Italy)
21	G	(Estonia)	Kristen Kasemets	BC Kalev	(Estonia)
90	F	(Lithuania)	Tautvydas Baltrušaitis	BC Alytus	(Lithuania)
13	F	(Lithuania)	Justinas Jogminas	Saint-Vallier Basket Drôme	(France)
17	C	(Lithuania)	Žygimantas Bartašius	ASD Promobasket Marigliano	(Italy)
7	G/F	(Lithuania)	Nojus Mineikis	Gargždai Basketball	(Lithuania)

== Season by season ==
Season	Tier	League	Pos.	KMT Cup
2005–06	3	RKL	1st	
2006–07	3	RKL	4th	
2007–08	2	NKL	14th	
2008–09	2	NKL	3rd	
2009–10	2	NKL	3rd	
2010–11	2	NKL	2nd	
2011–12	2	NKL	7th	
2012–13	2	NKL	1st	
2013–14	2	NKL	1st	
2014–15	1	LKL	11th	
2015–16	2	NKL	7th	
2016–17	2	NKL	12th	
2017–18	2	NKL	6th	
2018–19	2	NKL	14th	
2019–20	2	NKL	10th	
2020–21	2	NKL	14th	
2021–22	2	NKL	8th	
2022–23	2	NKL	2nd (Note: Promoted to the LKL, since Žalgiris-2 cannot play in the same division as their senior team.)	
2023–24	1	LKL	8th	Group stage
2024–25	1	LKL	10th	Group stage

Detailed information of former rosters and results.
