= Sūduva-Mantinga =

- Leagues: National Basketball League
- Founded: 2006
- History: Mantinga-ŽSM (2007–2011); Sūduva (2011–2012); Sūduva-Mantinga (2012–present)
- Arena: Marijampolė game sports school sports hall
- Location: Marijampolė, Lithuania
- Team colors: Red, White
- President: (Lithuania) Vytautas Skučas
- Head coach: (Lithuania) Marius Kiltinavičius
- Championships: 4 NKL
- Website: suduva-mantinga.lt
Home	Away

BC Sūduva (Lithuanian: Krepšinio Klubas Sūduva; English: Basketball Club Sūduva) known as Sūduva-Mantinga for sponsorship reasons, is a professional basketball club based in Marijampolė, Lithuania. Sūduva formerly participated in the LKL. On 16 September 2010, Sūduva basketball club was removed from the LKL because of financial problems. The club currently competes in the second-tier NKL.

The club was named after Suvalkija, an ethnographic region of Lithuania, of which Marijampolė is considered the capital.

== History ==
"Mantinga" basketball club was founded in 2007 in Marijampolė. The club aims to develop and promote basketball in Marijampolė.

The team was called "Mantinga − ŽSM" for the first two seasons and competed in RKL, showing better results every year. In the 2010–2011 season, the team won the Small Cup of the Regional Basketball League.

In 2011, the team changed its name and became "Sūduva" and started playing in the NKL. The debut was successful, Sūduva was one victory from reaching the NKL Final Four. Marijampolė municipality contributed to the team's sponsors.

== Players ==
=== Current roster ===
Note: Flags indicate national team eligibility at FIBA-sanctioned events. Players may hold other non-FIBA nationalities not displayed.

Sūduva-Mantinga roster
Players
Coaches

Pos.	No.	Nat.	Name	Ht.	Wt.	Age
SG	0	(Lithuania)	Šimonis, Žygimantas	1.94 m (6 ft 4 in)	86 kg (190 lb)	31 – 6 February 1995
PG	1	(Lithuania)	Merkys, Augustas	1.92 m (6 ft 4 in)	80 kg (176 lb)	20 – 19 November 2005
G	3	(Lithuania)	Urbonas, Aurimas	1.98 m (6 ft 6 in)	103 kg (227 lb)	33 – 30 March 1993
SG	4	(Lithuania)	Aukštikalnis, Lukas	1.96 m (6 ft 5 in)	85 kg (187 lb)	30 – 19 August 1995
SF	7	(Lithuania)	Labutis, Ignas	1.99 m (6 ft 6 in)	95 kg (209 lb)	32 – 29 April 1994
SF	10	(Lithuania)	Nausėdas, Justas	1.94 m (6 ft 4 in)	90 kg (198 lb)	33 – 3 August 1992
SG	11	(Lithuania)	Dabulevičius, Matas	1.88 m (6 ft 2 in)	79 kg (174 lb)	23 – 18 January 2003
C	12	(Lithuania)	Jezukevičius, Edvinas	2.07 m (6 ft 9 in)	110 kg (243 lb)	36 – 8 April 1990
C	14	(Lithuania)	Beniušis, Šarūnas	2.06 m (6 ft 9 in)	104 kg (229 lb)	33 – 16 April 1993
SF	19	(Lithuania)	Babarskis, Mantas	1.92 m (6 ft 4 in)	90 kg (198 lb)	22 – 11 September 2003
PG	22	(Lithuania)	Kliučinykas, Tautvydas	1.90 m (6 ft 3 in)	86 kg (190 lb)	31 – 22 January 1995
PF	25	(Lithuania)	Kieža, Aurimas	1.99 m (6 ft 6 in)	102 kg (225 lb)	43 – 25 October 1982
PF	26	(Lithuania)	Džiaugys, Evaldas	1.96 m (6 ft 5 in)	95 kg (209 lb)	29 – 26 September 1996

Head coach

- (Lithuania) Marius Kiltinavičius

Legend

- (C) Team captain
- Injured

- Roster
Updated: November 24, 2021

== Season by season ==
Season	League	Pos.
2006–07	LKL	8th
2007–08	LKL	10th
2008–09	LKL	11th
2009–10	LKL	11th
2010–11	RKL	1st
2011–12	NKL	4th
2012–13	NKL	4th
2013–14	NKL	10th
2014–15	NKL	3rd
2015–16	NKL	1st
2016–17	NKL	1st
2017–18	NKL	4th
2018–19	NKL	1st
2019–20	NKL	–^{1}
2020–21	NKL	4th

^1 Cancelled due to the COVID-19 pandemic in Europe.

== Head coaches ==
- (Lithuania) Povilas Šakinis: 2019–2021
- (Lithuania) Marius Kiltinavičius: 2021–present
