= BC Šilutė =

Šilutė
- Leagues: National Basketball League
- Founded: 1990
- Arena: Šilutė Vydūnas gimnasium Hall (Capacity:850)
- Location: Šilutė, Lithuania
- Team colors: White, Green and Black
- Head coach: (Lithuania) Kestutis Macijauskas
- Championships: LKAL Champions (2005) NKL Bronze (2020)
Home	Away

BC Šilutė is a professional Šilutė, Lithuania basketball club, currently playing in National Basketball League. BC Šilutė was founded in 1990 and currently is the oldest participant in NKL. From 1993 to 1999 seasons, BC Šilutė played in Lithuania super basketball league LKL, their highest achievement in LKL was Bronze medal. During 2004-2005 season, BC Šilutė won LKAL championship.

== Club achievements ==
- 1993-1994 season: LKL 7th place
- 1994-1995 season: LKL 5th place
- 1995-1996 season: LKL 4th place/ FIBA Korać cup 1/16
- 1996-1997 season: LKL 3rd place
- 1997-1998 season: LKL 6th place
- 1998-1999 season: LKL 10th place
- 1999-2000 season: LKAL 3rd place
- 2000-2001 season: LKAL 6th place
- 2001-2002 season: LKAL 7th place
- 2002-2003 season: LKAL 2nd place
- 2003-2004 season: LKAL 5-8th place (quarter-finals)
- 2004-2005 season: LKAL 1st place
- 2005-2006 season: NKL 13th place
- 2006-2007 season: NKL 4th place
- 2007-2008 season: NKL 5th place
- 2008-2009 season: NKL 15th place
- 2009-2010 season: NKL 15th place
- 2010-2011 season: NKL 11th place
- 2011-2012 season: NKL 14th place
- 2012-2013 season: NKL 16th place
- 2013-2014 season: NKL 8th place (Quarterfinals)
- 2014-2015 season: NKL 13th place
- 2015-2016 season: NKL 11th place
- 2016-2017 season: NKL 7th place
- 2017-2018 season: NKL 4th place (Quarterfinals)
- 2018-2019 season: NKL 12th place
- 2019-2020 season: NKL 3rd place

== Team roster ==
BC Šilutė roster
Players
Coaches

Pos.	No.	Nat.	Name	Ht.	Wt.	Age
SF	1	(Lithuania)	Poška, Tadas	1.93 m (6 ft 4 in)	84 kg (185 lb)	25 – 25 November 1999
SG	3	(Lithuania)	Mineikis, Ugnius	1.90 m (6 ft 3 in)	88 kg (194 lb)	24 – 26 October 2000
PG	8	(Lithuania)	Lekavičius, Linas	1.86 m (6 ft 1 in)	87 kg (192 lb)	40 – 29 November 1984
SG	8	(Lithuania)	Stonkus, Laurynas	1.91 m (6 ft 3 in)	81 kg (179 lb)	28 – 17 August 1997
SF	9	(Lithuania)	Dieninis, Mykolas	1.97 m (6 ft 6 in)	94 kg (207 lb)	28 – 27 January 1997
PG	10	(Lithuania)	Stašys, Mindaugas	1.80 m (5 ft 11 in)	72 kg (159 lb)	39 – 28 February 1986
PF	12	(Lithuania)	Sederevičius, Ernestas	1.95 m (6 ft 5 in)	90 kg (198 lb)	26 – 13 November 1998
PF	21	(United States)	King, Gabriel Michael	1.97 m (6 ft 6 in)	95 kg (209 lb)	28 – 31 August 1997
SG	22	(Lithuania)	Miliauskas, Robertas	1.96 m (6 ft 5 in)	78 kg (172 lb)	23 – 20 February 2002
SG	28	(Lithuania)	Jakubaitis, Vytautas	1.93 m (6 ft 4 in)	83 kg (183 lb)	25 – 28 June 2000
SF	34	(Lithuania)	Kumpys, Herkus	1.97 m (6 ft 6 in)	88 kg (194 lb)	26 – 4 November 1998
PF	42	(Lithuania)	Vasylius, Valdas	2.02 m (6 ft 8 in)	90 kg (198 lb)	42 – 3 September 1983

Head coach

- (Lithuania) Kęstutis Mačijauskas

Legend

- (C) Team captain
- Injured

- Roster
Updated: 12-10-2020

== Notable players and coaches ==
- (Lithuania) Mindaugas Timinskas (1997–1998) - player
- (Lithuania) Robertas Kuncaitis (2002–2004) - Head coach
- (Lithuania) Kęstutis Kemzūra (1996–1998) - player
- (Lithuania) Marijonas Petravičius (1997–1998) - player
- (Lithuania) Žydrūnas Stankus (1995–1998) - player
- (Lithuania) Marius Kasiulevičius (2004–2005) - player
- (Lithuania) Evaldas Dainys (2002–2003) - player
- (Lithuania) Jonas Elvikis (2002–2003) - player
