= Klaipėdos Neptūnas-Akvaservis =

Neptūnas-Akvaservis
- Leagues: National Basketball League
- Founded: 1987
- History: Klaipėdos Viesulas; 1987 - 1996; Universitetas-Irvinga; 1996 - 1999; Universitetas-Laivitė; 1999 - 2003; Nafta-Uni-Laivitė; 2003 - 2010; Nafta-Universitetas; 2010 - 2013; Nafta-Uni-Akvaservis; 2013-2017; Neptūnas-Akvaservis; 2017-present
- Arena: Palace of Sports and Gymnastics
- Location: Klaipėda, Lithuania
- Team colors: Blue and white
- President: (Lithuania) Aleksandr Lobačiov
- Head coach: (Lithuania) Alfredas Kaniava
- Affiliations: BC Neptūnas, VKKM
- Championships: NKL Champions (2007, 2015, 2018)
- Website: https://bcneptunas.lt/neptunas-akvaservis/
Home	Away

BC Neptūnas-Akvaservis is a professional Lithuanian basketball club from Klaipėda, Lithuania competing in the National Basketball League (NKL). The club's establishment dates to 1987, when the Klaipėdos Viesulas was set up. Since 1995, following the involvement and support of Klaipėda University, the club is focused on development of upcoming talents into the professional landscape.

In 1996, the club was renamed BC Universitetas-Irvinga to memorialize this change. Over the course of following years, the organization underwent several name changes reflecting change of sponsorship partnerships. From 2017 onward, the organization has maintained the name BC Neptūnas-Akvaservis, operating as the primary farm team affiliate of BC Neptūnas, the largest sports organization and professional club of the city.

== Current roster ==
Note: Flags indicate national team eligibility at FIBA-sanctioned events. Players may hold other non-FIBA nationalities not displayed.

Neptūnas-Akvaservis roster
Players
Coaches

Pos.	No.	Nat.	Name	Ht.	Wt.	Age
G	2	(Lithuania)	Knystautas, Arnas	1.87 m (6 ft 2 in)	74 kg (163 lb)	21 – 18 September 2004
C	3	(Lithuania)	Mažeika, Gabrielius	2.06 m (6 ft 9 in)	106 kg (234 lb)	23 – 23 January 2003
SG	8	(Lithuania)	Kreišmontas, Lukas	1.97 m (6 ft 6 in)	92 kg (203 lb)	25 – 8 April 2001
PG	9	(Lithuania)	Kneižys, Radvilas	1.93 m (6 ft 4 in)	90 kg (198 lb)	23 – 23 January 2003
PF	10	(Lithuania)	Brazauskas, Aringas	2.06 m (6 ft 9 in)	93 kg (205 lb)	22 – 30 September 2003
PG	12	(Lithuania)	Šakaitis, Rytis	1.93 m (6 ft 4 in)	74 kg (163 lb)	21 – 23 July 2004
C	17	(Lithuania)	Bartašius, Žygimantas	2.08 m (6 ft 10 in)	99 kg (218 lb)	22 – 8 March 2004
F	24	(Lithuania)	Keinys, Kristupas	2.01 m (6 ft 7 in)	87 kg (192 lb)	22 – 21 February 2004

Head coach

- (Lithuania) Alfredas Kaniava

Assistant coach(es)

- (Lithuania) Audrius Mineikis

Athletic trainer(s)

- (Lithuania) Mindaugas Mikuckis

Legend

- (C) Team captain
- Injured

- Roster
Updated: 03-10-2021

=== Squad changes for/during the 2023–24 season ===
==== In ====
No.	Pos.	Nat.	Name	Moving from

==== Out ====
No.	Pos.	Nat.	Name	Moving to	
0	PG	(Lithuania)	Adomas Sidarevičius	BC Pieno Žvaigždės	(Lithuania)
23	SF	(Lithuania)	Gediminas Leščiauskas	BC Gargždai	(Lithuania)

== Season by season ==
Season	League	Pos.	Significant Events	LKF Cup
1997–98	LKAL	13	–	–
1999–00	LKAL	9	–	–
2000–01	LKAL	3	–	–
2001–02	LKAL	7	–	–
2002–03	LKAL	4	–	–
2003–04	LKAL	5	–	–
2004–05	LKAL	4	–	–
2005–06	NKL	2	Runner-up	–
2006–07	NKL	1	Champion	–
2007–08	NKL	6	Quarterfinalist	–
2008–09	NKL	6	Quarterfinalist	–
2009–10	NKL	5	Quarterfinalist	–
2010–11	NKL	3	Bronze medal	First Round
2011–12	NKL	7	Quarterfinalist	–
2012–13	NKL	4	Semi-Finalist	–
2013–14	NKL	11	–	–
2014–15	NKL	1	Champion	–
2015–16	NKL	8	Quarterfinalist	–
2016–17	NKL	2	Runner-up	–
2017–18	NKL	1	Champion	–
2018–19	NKL	8	Quarterfinalist	–
2019–20	NKL	4	–	–
2020–21	NKL	10	Quarterfinalist	–
2021-22	NKL	12	Quarterfinalist	–

== Notable players ==
- (Lithuania) Arvydas Macijauskas (1996–1997)
- (Lithuania) Osvaldas Kurauskas (1997–1998)
- (Lithuania) Irmantas Milišauskas (2002–2005)
- (Lithuania) Aidas Viskontas (2003–2006)
- (Lithuania) Marius Runkauskas (2003–2007)
- (Lithuania) Deividas Gailius (2005–2007)
- (Lithuania) Egidijus Dimša (2006–2007)
- (Lithuania) Osvaldas Kurauskas (2006–2008)
- (Lithuania) Mindaugas Mockus (2008–2010)
- (Lithuania) Mindaugas Girdžiūnas (2011)
- (Lithuania) Artūras Gudaitis (2012)
- (Lithuania) Valdas Vasylius (2017–2018)
