= National Basketball League (Lithuania) =

- Founded: 2005; 21 years ago
- First season: 2005–06
- Country: Lithuania
- Confederation: FIBA Europe
- Number of teams: 15
- Level on pyramid: 2
- Promotion to: LKL
- Relegation to: RKL
- Current champions: BC Sūduva-Mantinga (5th title) (2025/26)
- Most championships: BC Sūduva-Mantinga (5 titles)
- Website: nklyga.lt

The National Basketball League (NKL) (Lithuanian: Nacionalinė krepšinio lyga), also known as 7bet-NKL for sponsorship reasons, is the second-tier basketball division in Lithuania. It is placed below the top division Lietuvos krepšinio lyga (LKL). The competition currently consists of 15 teams. The champions of the league have the option to promote to the LKL. However, this rarely happens, as most clubs do not meet the budgetary and arena infrastructure related requirements.

== History ==
The league was established in 2005, when the second division LKAL (Lietuvos Krepšinio A Lyga, Lithuanian Basketball A League) was abolished and split into two divisions, the NKL, which is its direct successor, and the newly founded third division RKL.

The inaugural season featured 16 teams, with Akademija-MRU Vilnius claiming the first championship. Operating across Lithuanian municipalities to grow the sport locally, the league's size has fluctuated between 14 and 19 participants throughout its history. The NKL functions under a system of promotion and relegation; the league champion earns the right to promote to the top-flight LKL, while the lowest-ranked teams face demotion to the RKL. The league features both independent clubs, such as BC Sūduva, and the reserve teams of major LKL clubs like Žalgiris Kaunas and Rytas Vilnius.

== Current teams and venues ==
NKL necessitates an arena with a seating capacity of 500 in order to enter in the competition.

2025–26 NKL clubs locations.

Team	Arena	Capacity	City	Founded
BC Alytus	Alytus Arena	5,500	Alytus	2024
BC Jurbarkas-Karys	Antanas Giedraitis-Giedrius Gymnasium Sports Hall	500	Jurbarkas	2016
BC Omega	Garliava Arena	1,300	Garliava	2009
BC Žalgiris-2	Žalgiris Training Center	500	Kaunas	1999
Kėdainių sporto centras	Kėdainiai Sport Center	UDC	Kėdainiai	2015
Kėdainių sporto centras	Kėdainiai Arena	2,200	Kėdainiai	2015
BC Neptūnas-Akvaservis	Palace of Sports and Gymnastics	400	Klaipėda	1987
BC Kretinga	Kretinga Arena	822	Kretinga	1999
BC Sūduva-Mantinga	Marijampolė SC Sports Hall	800	Marijampolė	2006
BC Mažeikiai	Mažeikiai Venta Progymnasium Sports Hall	500	Mažeikiai	2005
BC Olimpas Palanga	Palanga Arena	1,180	Palanga	2018
BC Olimpas Plungė	Plungė Arena	1,500	Plungė	1989
BC Vytis-VDU	Šakiai Sports Center	800	Šakiai	2005
BC Vytis-VDU	VDU Valdas Adamkus Sports Centre	300	(Akademija)	2005
BC Šilutė	Šilutės Vydūno Gymnasium	650	Šilutė	1990
BC Telšiai	Telšiai Sport Arena	1,000	Telšiai	2012
BC Stekas	Ukmergė TVM Sports Hall	UDC	Ukmergė	2010
BC Perlas	Vilkaviškis Sport Center	800	Vilkaviškis	2017
BC Rytas-2	Active Vilnius Arena	2,500	Vilnius	2003

== League champions ==
Season	Champion	Runner-up	Third Place	Finals MVP	Ref.
2005–06	Akademija-MRU Vilnius	Nafta-Uni-Laivitė Klaipėda	Puntukas-Jarimpeksas Anykščiai		
2006–07	Nafta-Uni-Laivitė Klaipėda	Dextera Jonava	Meresta Pakruojis	(Lithuania) Paulius Beliavičius	
2007–08	Žalgiris-Arvydas Sabonis school Kaunas	Naglis-Adarkis Palanga	Dextera Jonava		
2008–09	Rūdupis Prienai	Meresta Pakruojis	Mažeikiai		
2009–10	Naglis-Adarkis Palanga	Malsta Jonava	Mažeikiai		
2010–11	Pieno žvaigždės Pasvalys	Mažeikiai	Nafta-Universitetas Klaipėda	(United States) Darrick Leonard	
2011–12	LKKA-Atletas Kaunas	Statyba Vilnius	Žalgiris-Arvydas Sabonis school Kaunas	(Lithuania) Šarūnas Vingelis	
2012–13	Mažeikiai	Dzūkija Alytus	Žalgiris-2 Kaunas	(Lithuania) Rokas Giedraitis	
2013–14	Mažeikiai	Trakai	Tiumenas-Ežerūnas Molėtai	(Lithuania) Julius Kazakauskas	
2014–15	Nafta-Uni-Akvaservis Klaipėda	Ežerūnas-Karys Molėtai	Sūduva-Mantinga Marijampolė	(Lithuania) Mindaugas Stašys	
2015–16	Sūduva-Mantinga Marijampolė	Žalgiris-2 Kaunas	Palanga	(Lithuania) Donatas Sabeckis	
2016–17	Sūduva-Mantinga Marijampolė	Nafta-Uni-Akvaservis Klaipėda	Vytis Šakiai	(Lithuania) Gintautas Matulis	
2017–18	Neptūnas-Akvaservis Klaipėda	Žalgiris-2 Kaunas	Vytis Šakiai	(Lithuania) Aidas Einikis	
2018–19	Sūduva-Mantinga Marijampolė	Vytis Šakiai	BC Telšiai	(Lithuania) Aurimas Urbonas	
2019–20	Sūduva-Mantinga Marijampolė	BC Telšiai	BC Šilutė	Season stopped due to COVID-19 pandemic	
2020–21	Cbet Jonava	BC Telšiai	Vytis Šakiai	(Lithuania) Edvinas Šeškus	
2021–22	Gargždai	Sūduva-Mantinga Marijampolė	BC Telšiai	(Lithuania) Mindaugas Stašys	
2022–23	Žalgiris-2 Kaunas	M Basket Mažeikiai	BC Telšiai	(Lithuania) Gytis Nemeikšta	
2023–24	Jurbarkas-Karys	Kretinga	Olimpas Palanga	(Lithuania) Tomas Delininkaitis	
2024–25	BC Telšiai	Perlas Vilkaviškis	Žalgiris-2 Kaunas	(Lithuania) Lukas Valantinas	
2025–26	Sūduva-Mantinga Marijampolė	Neptūnas-Akvaservis Klaipėda	Vytis–VDU Šakiai	(Lithuania) Tautvydas Kliučinykas	

== Titles by club ==
Rank	Club	Titles	Runner-up	Champion years	Level	
1	BC Sūduva-Mantinga	5	1	2015–16, 2016–17, 2018–19, 2019–20, 2025–26	2.	NKL
2	BC Neptūnas-Akvaservis	3	3	2006–07, 2014–15, 2017–18	2.	NKL
3	BC Mažeikiai M Basket	2	2	2012–13, 2013–14	2.	NKL
–	BC Žalgiris-2	2	2	2007–08, 2022–23	2.	NKL
5	BC Jonava	1	2	2020–21	1.	LKL
–	BC Telšiai	1	2	2024–25	2.	NKL
7	BC Lietkabelis-2	1	1	2009–10	†	
8	Š.Marčiulionio KA-Twomenas	1	0	2005–06	†	
–	Labas Gas Prienai	1	0	2008–09	†	
–	BC Pieno žvaigždės	1	0	2010–11	†	
–	BC Atletas	1	0	2011–12	†	
–	Gargždai	1	0	2021–22	†	
–	Jurbarkas-Karys	1	0	2023–24	2.	NKL

† Marks defunct or inactive former winners of the competition.
