= 2024–25 BC Rytas season =

BC Rytas
2024–25 season
- Manager: (Lithuanian Basketball Federation) Mantvydas Dabašinskas
- Head coach: (Lithuanian Basketball Federation) Giedrius Žibėnas
- Arena: Active Vilnius Arena; Twinsbet Arena
- LKL: Runners-up
- Basketball Champions League: Round of 16
- King Mindaugas Cup: Quarterfinals
- Highest home attendance: LKL: 9,310; Rytas 83–84 Žalgiris (19 June 2025) Basketball Champions League: 5,919; Rytas 86–66 Galatasaray (29 January 2025)
- Lowest home attendance: LKL: 1,054; Rytas 102–69 M Basket-Delamode (22 March 2025) Basketball Champions League: 4,188; Rytas 103–83 Falco-Vulcano Szombathely (30 October 2024)
- Average home attendance: LKL: 3,475; Basketball Champions League: 4,982
- Biggest win: Rytas 127–81 Šiauliai–Casino Admiral (25 May 2025)
- Biggest defeat: Unicaja 91–73 Rytas (4 February 2025); Žalgiris 97–79 Rytas (18 May 2025)
Home	Away

The 2024–25 season is Rytas's 52nd (8th as Rytas) in the existence of the club.

Times up to 27 October 2024 and from 30 March 2025 are EEST (UTC+3). Times from 27 October 2024 to 30 March 2025 are EET (UTC+2).

== Players ==
=== Current roster ===
Note: Flags indicate national team eligibility at FIBA-sanctioned events. Players may hold other non-FIBA nationalities not displayed.

BC Rytas roster
Players
Coaches

Pos.	No.	Nat.	Name	Ht.	Wt.	Age
SF	1	(United States)	Flagg, Savion	2.01 m (6 ft 7 in)	102 kg (225 lb)	26 – 26 May 1999
G	2	(Lithuania)	Normantas, Margiris	1.94 m (6 ft 4 in)	94 kg (207 lb)	29 – 27 October 1996
PG	3	(United States)	Graves, Jayvon	1.91 m (6 ft 3 in)	91 kg (201 lb)	27 – 29 December 1998
G/F	7	(Lithuania)	Radzevičius, Gytis	1.97 m (6 ft 6 in)	95 kg (209 lb)	30 – 17 July 1995
F/C	10	(Lithuania)	Tubelis, Ąžuolas	2.08 m (6 ft 10 in)	111 kg (245 lb)	24 – 22 March 2002
F/C	14	(Lithuania)	Pleikys, Oskaras	2.02 m (6 ft 8 in)	105 kg (231 lb)	25 – 20 March 2001
G	16	(Lithuania)	Urbonas, Ignas	1.98 m (6 ft 6 in)	86 kg (190 lb)	18 – 22 November 2007
PG	20	(United States)	Cole, R. J.	1.85 m (6 ft 1 in)	84 kg (185 lb)	26 – 24 August 1999
PF	21	(Lithuania)	Masiulis, Gytis	2.07 m (6 ft 9 in)	99 kg (218 lb)	28 – 10 April 1998
PG	22	(Lithuania)	Križanauskas, Gantas	1.92 m (6 ft 4 in)	86 kg (190 lb)	20 – 22 March 2006
C	23	(United States)	Enoch, Steven	2.08 m (6 ft 10 in)	116 kg (256 lb)	28 – 18 September 1997
G	43	(Lithuania)	Sargiūnas, Ignas	1.96 m (6 ft 5 in)	86 kg (190 lb)	26 – 11 September 1999
SG	77	(Lithuania)	Paliukėnas, Martynas	1.95 m (6 ft 5 in)	94 kg (207 lb)	32 – 14 September 1993

Head coach

- (Lithuania) Giedrius Žibėnas

Assistant coach(es)

- (Greece) Georgios Dedas
- (Lithuania) Gustas Maskoliūnas

Athletic trainer(s)

- (Lithuania) Tadas Jackūnas

Physiotherapist(s)

- (Lithuania) Andrius Misiūra
- (Lithuania) Konstantinas Medvedevas

Legend

- (C) Team captain
- Injured

- Roster
Updated: July 29, 2024

=== Depth chart ===
Pos.	Starting 5	Bench 1	Bench 2
C	Steven Enoch	Gytis Masiulis
PF	Ąžuolas Tubelis	Savion Flagg	Oskaras Pleikys
SF	Gytis Radzevičius	Martynas Paliukėnas
SG	Margiris Normantas	Ignas Sargiūnas	Ignas Urbonas
PG	Jayvon Graves	R. J. Cole	Gantas Križanauskas

=== Squad changes for/during the 2024–25 season ===
Note: exact date is listed for players who joined or left during season.

==== In ====
No.	Pos.	Nat.	Name	Moving from		Source
1	SF	(United States)	Savion Flagg	Telekom Baskets Bonn	(Germany)	
3	PG	(United States)	Jayvon Graves	Riesen Ludwigsburg	(Germany)	
10	PF	(Lithuania)	Ąžuolas Tubelis	Neptūnas Klaipėda	(Lithuania)	
23	C	(United States)	Steven Enoch	Türk Telekom	(Turkey)	
43	SG	(Lithuania)	Ignas Sargiūnas	Neptūnas Klaipėda	(Lithuania)	
77	SG	(Lithuania)	Martynas Paliukėnas	M Basket Mažeikiai	(Lithuania)	

==== Out ====
No.	Pos.	Nat.	Name	Moving to		Source
1	PG	(Lithuania)	Arnas Velička	Löwen Braunschweig	(Germany)	
3	G	(Lithuania)	Modestas Babraitis	Cbet	(Lithuania)	
4	PF	(United States)	Justin Gorham	Derthona Basket	(Italy)	
10	SF	(Lithuania)	Lukas Uleckas	Šiauliai	(Lithuania)	
12	C	(United States)	Javin DeLaurier	Promitheas Patras	(Greece)	
14	C	(Lithuania)	Martynas Echodas	Manisa Basket	(Turkey)	
17	SG	(United States)	Marcus Foster	Hapoel Tel Aviv	(Israel)	

== Pre-season and friendlies ==
=== Friendly matches ===
28 August 2024	Rytas (Lithuanian Basketball Federation)	88–59	(Lithuanian Basketball Federation) Uniclub Bet – Juventus	Vilnius
17:30	Scoring by quarter: 26–12, 22–21, 19–8, 21–18
	Pts: Tubelis 17; Rebs: Tubelis 10; Asts: Cole 8 PIR: Tubelis 29	Report	Pts: Bieliauskas 15; Rebs: three players Asts: Chealey, Thorpe 4 PIR: Chealey 11	Arena: Jeep Arena; Attendance: 1,560; Referees: Gintaras Vitkauskas, Darius Šomka

2 September 2024	Rytas (Lithuanian Basketball Federation)	100–77	(Lithuanian Basketball Federation) Nevėžis–Optibet	Druskininkai
16:45	Scoring by quarter: 32–11, 20–30, 24–19, 24–17
	Pts: Flagg, Tubelis 17; Rebs: Radzevičius, Enoch 7 Asts: Normantas 6	Report	Pts: Kozys 15; Rebs: Manjgafic 8 Asts: Ebo 6	Arena: LSC sports complex Attendance: 100; Referees: Matas Masalskis, Tomas Stankevičius

6 September 2024	VEF Rīga (Latvian Basketball Association)	91–89	(Lithuanian Basketball Federation) Rytas	Šiauliai
15:15	Scoring by quarter: 27–23, 15–26, 31–21, 18–19
	Pts: Sanon 29; Rebs: Bobrov 10; Asts: Sanon 5 PIR: Sanon 26	Report	Pts: Tubelis 16; Rebs: Enoch, Flagg 5 Asts: Paliukėnas 6 PIR: Normantas 19	Arena: Šiauliai Arena; Referees: Jonas Lazauskas, Rytis Vitkus

7 September 2024	Tartu Ülikool Maks & Moorits (Estonian Basketball Association)	72–89	(Lithuanian Basketball Federation) Rytas	Šiauliai
15:00	Scoring by quarter: 14–19, 21–27, 18–22, 19–21
	Pts: El-Sheikh 15; Rebs: El-Sheikh 4 Asts: Bourcier 6 PIR: Bourcier, Paasoja 13	Report	Pts: Masiulis 20; Rebs: Pleikys 7 Asts: Paliukėnas 6 PIR: Masiulis 20	Arena: Šiauliai Arena; Referees: Vidmantas Rušinas, Eimantas Vasiliauskas

10 September 2024	Rytas (Lithuanian Basketball Federation)	87–84	(Azerbaijan Basketball Federation) Sabah BC	Vilnius
13:00	Scoring by quarter: 22–20, 22–23, 17–18, 26–23
	Pts: Cole 15; Rebs: Pleikys 8 Asts: Cole 5 PIR: Cole 18	Report	Pts: Williams 20; Rebs: Williams 8 Asts: Duval, Williams 4 PIR: Williams 24	Arena: Jeep Arena; Attendance: 20; Referees: Aurimas Borusas, Andžej Urbanovič

17 September 2024	Rytas (Lithuanian Basketball Federation)	109–104	(Lithuanian Basketball Federation) Cbet	Vilnius
14:45	Scoring by quarter: 35–30, 30–27, 29–18, 15–29
	Pts: Graves 26; Rebs: Masiulis 9 Asts: Flagg 7 PIR: Graves 27	Report	Pts: Brewton, McEwen 20; Rebs: Brewton 9 Asts: Brewton 10; PIR: Brewton 33	Arena: Jeep Arena; Referees: Andžej Urbanovič, Gintaras Vitkauskas

== Competitions ==
=== Overview ===
Competition	First match	Last match	Starting round	Final position	Record							
Competition	First match	Last match	Starting round	Final position	Pld	W	D	L	PF	PA	PD	Win %
LKL	21 September 2024	21 June 2025	Regular season	Runners-up	48	36		12	4,417	4,011	+406	75.00
Basketball Champions League	3 October 2024	25 March 2025	Regular season	Round of 16	12	7		5	1,038	981	+57	58.33
King Mindaugas Cup	21 December 2024	18 January 2025	Quarter-finals	Quarter-finals	2	1		1	155	159	−4	50.00
Total					62	44	0	18	5,610	5,151	+459	70.97

Last updated: 21 June 2025
Source: Competitions

=== LKL ===
==== League table ====
Pos	Team	Pld	W	L	PF	PA	PD	Qualification or relegation
1	Žalgiris	36	34	2	3286	2644	+642	Advance to playoffs
2	Rytas	36	29	7	3350	3033	+317	Advance to playoffs
3	7Bet–Lietkabelis	36	20 (Note: 7Bet–Lietkabelis are ahead of Wolves Twinsbet on head-to-head record: 7Bet–Lietkabelis 4–0 Wolves Twinsbet.)	16	3006	2921	+85	Advance to playoffs
4	Wolves Twinsbet	36	20	16	3253	3209	+44	Advance to playoffs
5	Cbet	36	19	17	3221	3240	−19	Advance to playoffs

Source: LKL.lt
Rules for classification: 1) Win–loss record; 2) Percentage of wins; 3) Head–to–head record; 4) Head–to–head percentage of wins; 5) Head–to–head point difference; 6) Head–to–head points scored; 7) Point difference; 8) Points scored; 9) Lottery draw (Note: Head–to–head record is used only after all the matches between the teams in question have been played)

==== Results summary ====
Overall						Home					Away				
Pld	W	L	PF	PA	PD	W	L	PF	PA	PD	W	L	PF	PA	PD
36	29	7	3350	3033	+317	15	3	1693	1518	+175	14	4	1657	1515	+142

Last updated: 17 May 2025.
Source: Competitive matches

==== Results by round ====
Round	1	2	3	4	5	6	7	8	9	10	11	12	13	14	15	16	17	18	19	20	21	22	23	24	25	26	27	28	29	30	31	32	33	34	35	36
Ground	A	A	H	A	A	H	A	H	H	A	A	H	H	A	H	H	A	A	H	H	A	H	A	H	A	H	A	H	A	H	A	A	H	H	A	A
Result	L	W	W	W	W	W	W	W	L	W	L	W	W	W	W	W	W	W	W	L	L	W	W	W	L	W	W	W	W	W	W	W	W	W	L	W
Position	8	5	5	3	2	1	1	1	1	1	2	2	2	2	2	2	2	2	2	2	2	2	2	2	2	2	2	2	2	2	2	2	2	2	2	2

Source: Competitive matches
A = Away; H = Home; W = Win; L = Loss; R = Rest

==== Matches ====
21 September 2024 1	Rytas	84–90	Neptūnas	Vilnius
19:00	Scoring by quarter: 12–19, 21–17, 24–23, 27–31
	Pts: Masiulis 18; Rebs: Normantas 8 Asts: Graves 6 PIR: Masiulis 24	Boxscore	Pts: Buie 26; Rebs: Pavelka 10; Asts: Johnson 4 PIR: Buie 28	Arena: Active Vilnius Arena; Attendance: 2,259; Referees: Gytis Vilius, Juozas Barkauskas, Gintaras Vitkauskas

28 September 2024 2	Uniclub Bet – Juventus	78–86	Rytas	Utena
16:50	Scoring by quarter: 21–28, 17–26, 20–17, 20–15
	Pts: Thorpe 22; Rebs: Toro 7 Asts: three players 2 PIR: Thorpe 22	Boxscore	Pts: Flagg 17; Rebs: Tubelis 11; Asts: Paliukėnas 6 PIR: Flagg 21	Arena: Utena Arena; Attendance: 1,614; Referees: Saulius Račys, Gintaras Mačiulis, Jonas Lazauskas

6 October 2024 3	Rytas	91–88	Žalgiris	Vilnius
16:50	Scoring by quarter: 22–18, 28–17, 23–25, 18–28
	Pts: Radzevičius 20; Rebs: Masiulis 9 Asts: Cole 4 PIR: Radzevičius 27	Boxscore	Pts: Dunston, Ulanovas 16; Rebs: Birutis, Giedraitis 3 Asts: Francisco 8 PIR: Francisco, Ulanovas 19	Arena: Twinsbet Arena; Attendance: 8,491; Referees: Gytis Vilius, Artūras Šukys, Gvidas Gedvilas

12 October 2024 4	7Bet–Lietkabelis	67–84	Rytas	Panevėžys
16:50	Scoring by quarter: 19–21, 13–29, 17–20, 18–14
	Pts: Varnas 12; Rebs: Pecarski 8 Asts: Rubštavičius, Vasiliauskas 3 PIR: Vasiliauskas 10	Boxscore	Pts: Tubelis 14; Rebs: Tubelis 7 Asts: Normantas 4 PIR: Tubelis 21	Arena: Kalnapilio Arena; Attendance: 2,330; Referees: Jurgis Laurinavičius, Artūras Šukys, Gabrielius Simonavičius

20 October 2024 5	Nevėžis–Optibet	83–93	Rytas	Kėdainiai
19:00	Scoring by quarter: 26–21, 22–32, 23–20, 12–20
	Pts: Ebo 26; Rebs: Ebo, Nkereuwem 5 Asts: Ebo 7 PIR: Ebo 25	Boxscore	Pts: Flagg 18; Rebs: Flagg 11; Asts: Paliukėnas, Radzevičius 4 PIR: Flagg 23	Arena: Kėdainiai Arena; Attendance: 1,327; Referees: Gvidas Gedvilas, Aurimas Borusas, Darius Šomka

26 October 2024 6	Rytas	118–109	Šiauliai–Casino Admiral	Vilnius
16:50	Scoring by quarter: 30–31, 21–28, 38–27, 29–23
	Pts: Normantas 34; Rebs: three players 6 Asts: Normantas 4 PIR: Normantas 39	Boxscore	Pts: Blakes 30; Rebs: Uleckas 7 Asts: Kulvietis 5 PIR: Uleckas 30	Arena: Active Vilnius Arena; Attendance: 2,071; Referees: Gvidas Gedvilas, Gintaras Vitkauskas, Martynas Karaliūnas

3 November 2024 7	Cbet	74–94	Rytas	Jonava
16:00	Scoring by quarter: 21–16, 25–36, 12–23, 16–19
	Pts: Brewton 17; Rebs: Venskus 7 Asts: three players 3 PIR: Brewton 12	Boxscore	Pts: Graves 19; Rebs: Tubelis 8 Asts: Flagg, Normantas 4 PIR: Graves 20	Arena: Jonava Arena; Attendance: 1,511; Referees: Gytis Vilius, Dovydas Kairys, Deividas Mačiulskis

9 November 2024 8	Rytas	109–98	M Basket-Delamode	Vilnius
17:00	Scoring by quarter: 22–25, 33–27, 36–17, 18–29
	Pts: Radzevičius 17; Rebs: Enoch 6 Asts: Cole, Normantas 4 PIR: Radzevičius 25	Boxscore	Pts: Bruhnke 28; Rebs: Zdanavičius 11; Asts: Sabeckis 5 PIR: Bruhnke 31	Arena: Active Vilnius Arena; Attendance: 1,811; Referees: Juozas Barkauskas, Andžej Urbanovič, Jonas Lazauskas

17 November 2024 9	Rytas	71–82	Wolves Twinsbet	Vilnius
16:50	Scoring by quarter: 15–11, 22–15, 17–29, 17–27
	Pts: Normantas 16; Rebs: Enoch 8 Asts: Masiulis, Normantas 3 PIR: Normantas 20	Boxscore	Pts: Thurman 21; Rebs: Miniotas 8 Asts: Taylor, Žemaitis 4 PIR: Thurman 22	Arena: Twinsbet Arena; Attendance: 5,600; Referees: Gytis Vilius, Artūras Šukys, Saulius Račys

30 November 2024 10	M Basket-Delamode	83–93	Rytas	Telšiai
16:50	Scoring by quarter: 19–16, 23–29, 20–23, 21–25
	Pts: Bruhnke 25; Rebs: Bruhnke 7 Asts: Bruhnke, Collins 3 PIR: Bruhnke 22	Boxscore	Pts: Tubelis 23; Rebs: Tubelis 7 Asts: three players 5 PIR: Tubelis 33	Arena: Telšiai sports arena Attendance: 798; Referees: Jurgis Laurinavičius, Dovydas Kairys, Gintaras Vitkauskas

8 December 2024 11	Žalgiris	78–67	Rytas	Kaunas
16:50	Scoring by quarter: 19–21, 20–11, 18–16, 21–19
	Pts: Brazdeikis 16; Rebs: Smailagić 11; Asts: Brazdeikis 5 PIR: Brazdeikis, Smailagić 25	Boxscore	Pts: Graves 18; Rebs: Tubelis 13; Asts: Flagg, Normantas 4 PIR: Tubelis 17	Arena: Žalgiris Arena; Attendance: 13,359; Referees: Gytis Vilius, Saulius Račys, Gvidas Gedvilas

14 December 2024 12	Rytas	89–69	Nevėžis–Optibet	Vilnius
19:00	Scoring by quarter: 24–21, 20–16, 23–17, 22–15
	Pts: Enoch, Masiulis 13; Rebs: Pleikys 11; Asts: Normantas 10; PIR: Enoch 21	Boxscore	Pts: Girard III 21; Rebs: Vaitkus 6 Asts: Girard III 5 PIR: Croswell 13	Arena: Active Vilnius Arena; Attendance: 1,418; Referees: Jurgis Laurinavičius, Gabrielius Simonavičius, Vidmantas Rušinas

28 December 2024 13	Rytas	90–78	7Bet–Lietkabelis	Vilnius
19:00	Scoring by quarter: 20–23, 27–17, 17–21, 26–17
	Pts: Normantas, Tubelis 16; Rebs: Radzevičius, Tubelis 5 Asts: Cole, Normantas 6 PIR: Normantas 22	Boxscore	Pts: Gagić 19; Rebs: Đorđe Gagić 12; Asts: Bičkauskis 6 PIR: Gagić 30	Arena: Active Vilnius Arena; Attendance: 2,312; Referees: Gvidas Gedvilas, Aurimas Borusas, Martynas Karaliūnas

4 January 2025 14	Neptūnas	76–94	Rytas	Klaipėda
19:00	Scoring by quarter: 26–21, 18–29, 17–22, 15–22
	Pts: Buie 15; Rebs: Waterman 5 Asts: Buie 9 PIR: Buie 20	Boxscore	Pts: Tubelis 17; Rebs: Tubelis 10; Asts: Normantas 5 PIR: Tubelis 23	Arena: Švyturys Arena; Attendance: 3,496; Referees: Jurgis Laurinavičius, Gabrielius Simonavičius, Dovydas Kairys

12 January 2025 15	Rytas	90–76	Uniclub Bet – Juventus	Vilnius
16:50	Scoring by quarter: 17–26, 26–17, 25–8, 22–25
	Pts: Tubelis 18; Rebs: Three players 5 Asts: Cole 8 PIR: Tubelis 22	Boxscore	Pts: Three players 17; Rebs: Toro 11; Asts: Thorpe 5 PIR: Green, Toro 15	Arena: Active Vilnius Arena; Attendance: 2,203; Referees: Juozas Barkauskas, Gintaras Mačiulis, Gintaras Vitkauskas

25 January 2025 16	Rytas	84–80	Cbet	Vilnius
16:50	Scoring by quarter: 11–15, 30–28, 20–17, 23–20
	Pts: Normantas, Radzevičius 14; Rebs: Masiulis 10; Asts: Cole 4 PIR: Masiulis, Radzevičius 16	Boxscore	Pts: Childress 20; Rebs: Brewton 7 Asts: Three players 3 PIR: Brewton 24	Arena: Active Vilnius Arena; Attendance: 1,349; Referees: Saulius Račys, Dovydas Kairys, Darius Šomka

1 February 2025 17	Šiauliai–Casino Admiral	79–89	Rytas	Šiauliai
17:00	Scoring by quarter: 20–17, 32–23, 14–28, 13–21
	Pts: Blakes 20; Rebs: Čižauskas, Kupšas 7 Asts: Three players 3 PIR: Buchanan 22	Boxscore	Pts: Radzevičius 19; Rebs: Radzevičius 7 Asts: Radzevičius 6 PIR: Radzevičius 25	Arena: Šiauliai Arena; Attendance: 3,370; Referees: Gintaras Mačiulis, Aurimas Borusas, Martynas Karaliūnas

8 February 2025 18	Wolves Twinsbet	84–88	Rytas	Vilnius
19:00	Scoring by quarter: 22–25, 21–18, 18–25, 23–20
	Pts: Kulboka 19; Rebs: Brooks, Taylor 6 Asts: Cowan Jr. 8 PIR: Cowan Jr. 22	Boxscore	Pts: Normantas 20; Rebs: Flagg 7 Asts: Cole, Paliukėnas 5 PIR: Normantas 23	Arena: Twinsbet Arena; Attendance: 5,058; Referees: Gytis Vilius, Saulius Račys, Dovydas Kairys

1 March 2025 19	Rytas	99–98	Nevėžis–Optibet	Vilnius
17:00	Scoring by quarter: 28–35, 25–24, 24–16, 22–23
	Pts: Radzevičius 23; Rebs: Radzevičius 7 Asts: Jackson-Cartwright 4 PIR: Radzevičius 35	Boxscore	Pts: Croswell 21; Rebs: Croswell 7 Asts: Mikalauskas 8 PIR: Croswell 24	Arena: Active Vilnius Arena; Attendance: 1,552; Referees: Gvidas Gedvilas, Andžej Urbanovič, Deividas Mačiulskis

9 March 2025 20	Rytas	76–83	Žalgiris	Vilnius
16:50	Scoring by quarter: 14–24, 20–17, 15–24, 27–18
	Pts: Graves 14; Rebs: Radzevičius 10; Asts: Cole 4 PIR: Radzevičius 19	Boxscore	Pts: Birutis 16; Rebs: Birutis 10; Asts: Brazdeikis 6 PIR: Birutis 29	Arena: Twinsbet Arena; Attendance: 8,605; Referees: Gytis Vilius, Artūras Šukys, Saulius Račys

15 March 2025 21	7Bet–Lietkabelis	82–75	Rytas	Panevėžys
17:00	Scoring by quarter: 24–19, 20–6, 15–27, 23–23
	Pts: Bičkauskis 20; Rebs: Danusevičius 5 Asts: Kovliar 5 PIR: Bičkauskis 25	Boxscore	Pts: Radzevičius 22; Rebs: Radzevičius 12; Asts: Normantas 3 PIR: Radzevičius 29	Arena: Kalnapilio Arena; Attendance: 3,256; Referees: Artūras Šukys, Gvidas Gedvilas, Aurimas Borusas

22 March 2025 22	Rytas	102–69	M Basket-Delamode	Vilnius
17:00	Scoring by quarter: 26–13, 27–22, 27–19, 22–15
	Pts: Flagg 20; Rebs: Masiulis 11; Asts: Jackson-Cartwright, Normantas 7 PIR: Normantas 24	Boxscore	Pts: Mineikis 16; Rebs: Čižauskas, Mineikis 7 Asts: Čižauskas, Mineikis 4 PIR: Mineikis 21	Arena: Active Vilnius Arena; Attendance: 1,054; Referees: Juozas Barkauskas, Gintaras Vitkauskas, Jonas Lazauskas

29 March 2025 23	Šiauliai–Casino Admiral	82–102	Rytas	Šiauliai
17:00	Scoring by quarter: 21–28, 21–23, 22–26, 18–25
	Pts: Blakes 17; Rebs: Uleckas 9 Asts: Buchanan 4 PIR: Uleckas 25	Boxscore	Pts: Enoch 17; Rebs: Tubelis 10; Asts: Jackson-Cartwright 8 PIR: Radzevičius 26	Arena: Šiauliai Arena; Attendance: 2,513; Referees: Gintaras Mačiulis, Dovydas Kairys, Vidmantas Rušinas

6 April 2025 24	Rytas	92–88	Wolves Twinsbet	Vilnius
19:00	Scoring by quarter: 33–19, 15–26, 21–23, 23–20
	Pts: Cole 19; Rebs: Radzevičius 11; Asts: Cole 5 PIR: Radzevičius 25	Boxscore	Pts: Andrews 19; Rebs: Brooks, Miniotas 5 Asts: Cowan Jr. 9 PIR: Cowan Jr. 19	Arena: Twinsbet Arena; Attendance: 4,460; Referees: Artūras Šukys, Saulius Račys, Gvidas Gedvilas

12 April 2025 25	Neptūnas	92–85	Rytas	Klaipėda
17:00	Scoring by quarter: 14–26, 20–24, 34–21, 24–14
	Pts: Buie 31; Rebs: Pacevičius 13; Asts: Buie 6 PIR: Buie 39	Boxscore	Pts: Cole 12; Rebs: Enoch, Gudaitis 3 Asts: Graves 4 PIR: Gudaitis 13	Arena: Švyturys Arena; Attendance: 2,390; Referees: Artūras Šukys, Aurimas Borusas, Jonas Lazauskas

16 April 2025 26	Rytas	90–75	Uniclub Bet – Juventus	Vilnius
19:00	Scoring by quarter: 17–20, 23–20, 24–17, 26–18
	Pts: Radzevičius 19; Rebs: Radzevičius 11; Asts: Paliukėnas, Radzevičius 3 PIR: Radzevičius 35	Boxscore	Pts: Beliauskas, Brown 14; Rebs: Mathon 9 Asts: Brown 5 PIR: Beniušis 14	Arena: Active Vilnius Arena; Attendance: 1324; Referees: Gytis Vilius, Andžej Urbanovič, Gintaras Vitkauskas

21 April 2025 27	Cbet	99–104	Rytas	Jonava
19:00	Scoring by quarter: 29–26, 25–30, 21–28, 24–20
	Pts: Brewton 25; Rebs: Brewton 9 Asts: Pleikys 5 PIR: Brewton 32	Boxscore	Pts: Tubelis 26; Rebs: Masiulis 7 Asts: Jackson-Cartwright 6 PIR: Radzevičius 27	Arena: Jonava Arena; Attendance: 1,734; Referees: Juozas Barkauskas, Dovydas Kairys, Darius Šomka

24 April 2025 28	Rytas	103–85	Neptūnas	Vilnius
18:30	Scoring by quarter: 30–16, 21–24, 26–22, 26–23
	Pts: Cole 19; Rebs: Jackson-Cartwright 6 Asts: Jackson-Cartwright 7 PIR: Masiulis 25	Boxscore	Pts: Johnson 24; Rebs: Pacevičius 10; Asts: Janavičius, Johnson 5 PIR: Johnson 28	Arena: Active Vilnius Arena; Attendance: 1,786; Referees: Gytis Vilius, Juozas Barkauskas, Aurimas Borusas

26 April 2025 29	M Basket-Delamode	81–113	Rytas	Telšiai
16:50	Scoring by quarter: 20–30, 20–24, 22–28, 19–31
	Pts: Jogminas 18; Rebs: Jogminas 7 Asts: Urkis 4 PIR: Jogminas 24	Boxscore	Pts: Tubelis 19; Rebs: Gudaitis 11; Asts: Paliukėnas 8 PIR: Normantas 22	Arena: Telšiai sports arena Attendance: 420; Referees: Gvidas Gedvilas, Darius Šomka, Vidmantas Rušinas

29 April 2025 30	Rytas	112–82	Cbet	Vilnius
18:30	Scoring by quarter: 32–22, 27–31, 24–4, 29–25
	Pts: Tubelis 21; Rebs: Tubelis 9 Asts: Jackson-Cartwright 9 PIR: Tubelis 27	Boxscore	Pts: Brewton 17; Rebs: Pleikys 7 Asts: Brewton 4 PIR: Blyzniuk 23	Arena: Active Vilnius Arena; Attendance: 1,813; Referees: Artūras Šukys, Dovydas Kairys, Gabrielius Simonavičius

4 May 2025 31	Wolves Twinsbet	89–102	Rytas	Vilnius
16:50	Scoring by quarter: 22–28, 25–14, 26–28, 16–32
	Pts: Cowan Jr. 21; Rebs: Miniotas 8 Asts: Cowan Jr. 7 PIR: Cowan Jr. 27	Boxscore	Pts: Cole 23; Rebs: Radzevičius 9 Asts: Jackson-Cartwright 8 PIR: Radzevičius 24	Arena: Aerottoria arena Attendance: 1,167; Referees: Gytis Vilius, Saulius Račys, Aurimas Borusas

7 May 2025 32	Uniclub Bet – Juventus	90–104	Rytas	Utena
18:30	Scoring by quarter: 21–21, 23–30, 24–26, 22–27
	Pts: Mathon 14; Rebs: Beniušis 7 Asts: Ramanauskas 4 PIR: Mathon 20	Boxscore	Pts: Radzevičius 20; Rebs: Masiulis, Tubelis 7 Asts: Normantas, Radzevičius 4 PIR: Masiulis 26	Arena: Utena Arena; Attendance: 913; Referees: Juozas Barkauskas, Dovydas Kairys, Martynas Karaliūnas

10 May 2025 33	Rytas	90–72	7Bet–Lietkabelis	Vilnius
16:50	Scoring by quarter: 18–23, 33–14, 17–13, 22–22
	Pts: Cole, Gudaitis 14; Rebs: Four players 5 Asts: Jackson-Cartwright 7 PIR: Gudaitis 22	Boxscore	Pts: Kovliar 15; Rebs: Danusevičius 8 Asts: Kovliar 7 PIR: Kovliar 19	Arena: Active Vilnius Arena; Attendance: 2,041; Referees: Gytis Vilius, Gintaras Mačiulis, Gabrielius Simonavičius

13 May 2025 34	Rytas	103–96	Šiauliai–Casino Admiral	Vilnius
18:30	Scoring by quarter: 30–33, 21–25, 37–13, 15–25
	Pts: Normantas 21; Rebs: Tubelis 4 Asts: Paliukėnas 6 PIR: Cole 26	Boxscore	Pts: Jogėla 22; Rebs: Jogėla, Kupšas 6 Asts: Buchanan 8 PIR: Jogėla 23	Arena: Active Vilnius Arena; Attendance: 1,542; Referees: Artūras Šukys, Dovydas Kairys, Deividas Mačiulskis

18 May 2025 35	Žalgiris	97–79	Rytas	Kaunas
16:50	Scoring by quarter: 25–11, 22–18, 22–26, 28–24
	Pts: Brazdeikis, Francisco 16; Rebs: Ulanovas 7 Asts: Francisco 9 PIR: Francisco 26	Boxscore	Pts: Cole 20; Rebs: Tubelis, Masiulis 5 Asts: Cole, Normantas 5 PIR: Cole 24	Arena: Žalgiris Arena; Attendance: 12,898; Referees: Gytis Vilius, Artūras Šukys, Dovydas Kairys

21 May 2025 36	Nevėžis–Optibet	101–105	Rytas	Kėdainiai
18:30	Scoring by quarter: 28–24, 20–23, 28–29, 25–29
	Pts: Bukauskas, Girard III 25; Rebs: Mikalauskas 9 Asts: Bukauskas 8 PIR: Bukauskas 36	Boxscore	Pts: Jackson-Cartwright 20; Rebs: Radzevičius 10; Asts: Graves 6 PIR: Tubelis 26	Arena: Kėdainiai Arena; Attendance: 1,238; Referees: Gytis Vilius, Juozas Barkauskas, Jonas Lazauskas

=== LKL Playoffs ===
==== Quarterfinals ====
25 May 2025 Game 1	Rytas	127–81 (Series: 1–0)	Šiauliai–Casino Admiral	Vilnius
16:50	Scoring by quarter: 28–17, 30–24, 37–22, 32–18
	Pts: Tubelis 15; Rebs: three players 5 Asts: Cole 7 PIR: Tubelis 23	Boxscore	Pts: Blakes 17; Rebs: Kulvietis 6 Asts: Singleton, Valinskas 3 PIR: Romančenko 22	Arena: Active Vilnius Arena; Attendance: 1,918; Referees: Gvidas Gedvilas, Gabrielius Simonavičius, Darius Šomka

27 May 2025 Game 2	Šiauliai–Casino Admiral	84–110 (Series: 0–2)	Rytas	Šiauliai
18:30	Scoring by quarter: 24–34, 19–25, 22–31, 19–20
	Pts: Stankevičius 14; Rebs: Stankevičius, Kupšas 6 Asts: Buchanan 6 PIR: Kulvietis 17	Boxscore	Pts: three players 16; Rebs: Flagg 7 Asts: Cole 11; PIR: Graves 23	Arena: Šiauliai Arena; Attendance: 1,537; Referees: Juozas Barkauskas, Gintaras Mačiulis, Dovydas Kairys

==== Semifinals ====
30 May 2025 Game 1	Rytas	86–82 (Series: 1–0)	7Bet–Lietkabelis	Vilnius
18:50	Scoring by quarter: 27–24, 15–18, 23–24, 21–16
	Pts: Cole 15; Rebs: Gudaitis 7 Asts: Radzevičius 4 PIR: Gudaitis 24	Boxscore	Pts: Rubštavičius 20; Rebs: Danusevičius, Maldūnas 7 Asts: Gagić, Maldūnas 3 PIR: Rubštavičius, Maldūnas 16	Arena: Twinsbet Arena; Attendance: 3,040; Referees: Saulius Račys, Jurgis Laurinavičius, Gintaras Mačiulis

1 June 2025 Game 2	7Bet–Lietkabelis	76–73 (Series: 1–1)	Rytas	Panevėžys
16:50	Scoring by quarter: 23–12, 18–21, 16–21, 19–19
	Pts: Rubštavičius 19; Rebs: Maldūnas 6 Asts: Bičkauskis 4 PIR: Bičkauskis 21	Boxscore	Pts: Radzevičius 21; Rebs: Tubelis 8 Asts: Jackson-Cartwright 3 PIR: Radzevičius, Normantas 21	Arena: Kalnapilio Arena; Attendance: 2,864; Referees: Gytis Vilius, Gvidas Gedvilas, Juozas Barkauskas

4 June 2025 Game 3	Rytas	87–86 (Series: 2–1)	7Bet–Lietkabelis	Vilnius
18:50	Scoring by quarter: 20–14, 20–22, 15–23, 32–27
	Pts: Cole 17; Rebs: Radzevičius 9 Asts: three players 3 PIR: Cole 21	Boxscore	Pts: Kovliar 22; Rebs: Maldūnas 10; Asts: Kovliar 8 PIR: Rubštavičius, Danusevičius 18	Arena: Twinsbet Arena; Attendance: 3903; Referees: Artūras Šukys, Gvidas Gedvilas, Aurimas Borusas

6 June 2025 Game 4	7Bet–Lietkabelis	87–76 (Series: 2–2)	Rytas	Panevėžys
18:50	Scoring by quarter: 23–20, 20–18, 20–15, 24–23
	Pts: Gagić, Kovliar 16; Rebs: Gagić, Maldūnas 7 Asts: Maldūnas, Kovliar 4 PIR: Gagić 22	Boxscore	Pts: Cole 12; Rebs: four players 6 Asts: Cole 3 PIR: Cole 16	Arena: Kalnapilio Arena; Attendance: 3,428; Referees: Gytis Vilius, Jurgis Laurinavičius, Juozas Barkauskas

8 June 2025 Game 5	Rytas	94–70 (Series: 3–2)	7Bet–Lietkabelis	Vilnius
16:50	Scoring by quarter: 24–17, 27–16, 24–26, 19–11
	Pts: Radzevičius 15; Rebs: Radzevičius 8 Asts: Cole, Jackson-Cartwright 5 PIR: Radzevičius 22	Boxscore	Pts: Rubštavičius 20; Rebs: Gagić 7 Asts: Bičkauskis, Kovliar 4 PIR: Rubštavičius 26	Arena: Twinsbet Arena; Attendance: 5,070; Referees: Gytis Vilius, Gvidas Gedvilas, Jurgis Laurinavičius

==== Final ====
12 June 2025 Game 1	Žalgiris	89–97(OT) (Series: 0–1)	Rytas	Kaunas
18:50	Scoring by quarter: 15–19, 17–22, 20–17, 21–15, Overtime: 9–9, 7–15
	Pts: Francisco 31; Rebs: Dunston 8 Asts: Francisco, Giedraitis 3 PIR: Francisco 29	Boxscore	Pts: Tubelis 21; Rebs: Radzevičius, Tubelis 8 Asts: Gudaitis, Sargiūnas 4 PIR: Tubelis 23	Arena: Žalgiris Arena; Attendance: 9,281; Referees: Gytis Vilius, Gvidas Gedvilas, Gintaras Mačiulis

14 June 2025 Game 2	Rytas	79–83 (Series: 1–1)	Žalgiris	Vilnius
16:50	Scoring by quarter: 20–15, 13–21, 22–21, 24–26
	Pts: Jackson-Cartwright 20; Rebs: Tubelis 6 Asts: Cole 4 PIR: Jackson-Cartwright 21	Boxscore	Pts: Sirvydis 20; Rebs: Dunston, Smailagić 5 Asts: Francisco 4 PIR: Francisco 20	Arena: Twinsbet Arena; Attendance: 8,463; Referees: Gytis Vilius, Saulius Račys, Jurgis Laurinavičius

17 June 2025 Game 3	Žalgiris	80–86 (Series: 1–2)	Rytas	Kaunas
18:50	Scoring by quarter: 15–21, 16–28, 33–18, 16–19
	Pts: Francisco 19; Rebs: Birutis 6 Asts: Francisco 6 PIR: Ulanovas 21	Boxscore	Pts: Sargiūnas 17; Rebs: Tubelis 9 Asts: Cole 6 PIR: Tubelis 20	Arena: Žalgiris Arena; Attendance: 12,205; Referees: Gytis Vilius, Saulius Račys, Artūras Šukys

19 June 2025 Game 4	Rytas	83–84 (Series: 2–2)	Žalgiris	Vilnius
16:50	Scoring by quarter: 24–15, 22–26, 22–13, 15–30
	Pts: Cole 22; Rebs: Tubelis 8 Asts: Cole 5 PIR: Cole 25	Boxscore	Pts: Francisco 29; Rebs: Birutis, Francisco 5 Asts: Francisco 7 PIR: Francisco 34	Arena: Twinsbet Arena; Attendance: 9,310; Referees: Gytis Vilius, Artūras Šukys, Juozas Barkauskas

21 June 2025 Game 5	Žalgiris	76–69 (Series: 3–2)	Rytas	Kaunas
16:50	Scoring by quarter: 15–15, 14–15, 21–25, 26–24
	Pts: Francisco 15; Rebs: Birutis 8 Asts: Francisco 7 PIR: Francisco 21	Boxscore	Pts: Jackson-Cartwright, Tubelis 16; Rebs: Tubelis 10; Asts: Jackson-Cartwright, Normantas 4 PIR: Tubelis 17	Arena: Žalgiris Arena; Attendance: 14,417; Referees: Gytis Vilius, Jurgis Laurinavičius, Juozas Barkauskas

=== Basketball Champions League ===
==== Regular season ====
===== Group F =====
Pos	Team	Pld	W	L	PF	PA	PD	Pts	Qualification
1	(Lithuania) Rytas	6	5	1	542	479	+63	11	Advance to round of 16
2	(Hungary) Falco-Vulcano Szombathely	6	3	3	472	484	−12	9	Advance to play-ins
3	(Italy) Unahotels Reggio Emilia	6	3	3	458	462	−4	9	Advance to play-ins
4	(Poland) Śląsk Wrocław	6	1	5	447	494	−47	7	

Source: Group Standings

==== Regular season matches ====
1 October 2024 1	Pallacanestro Reggiana (Italian Basketball Federation)	77–67	(Lithuanian Basketball Federation) Rytas	Reggio Emilia
21:00	Scoring by quarter: 24–21, 16–13, 17–20, 20–13
	Pts: Faye 15; Rebs: Barford 9 Asts: Winston 6 PIR: Faye 24	Boxscore	Pts: Radzevičius 16; Rebs: Tubelis 10; Asts: Flagg, Graves 4 PIR: Radzevičius 20	Arena: PalaBigi; Attendance: 2,426; Referees: Luis Castillo, Ariadna Chueca, Ilias Kounelles

16 October 2024 2	Rytas (Lithuanian Basketball Federation)	98–75	(Polish Basketball Federation) Śląsk Wrocław	Vilnius
19:30	Scoring by quarter: 28–16, 22–17, 11–10, 37–32
	Pts: Radzevičius 23; Rebs: Radzevičius 9 Asts: Paliukėnas 7 PIR: Radzevičius 30	Boxscore	Pts: Nunez, Senglin 13; Rebs: Blackshear 6 Asts: Senglin 5 PIR: Lynch 18	Arena: Twinsbet Arena; Attendance: 4,902; Referees: Fernando Calatrava, Martin Horozov, Ventsislav Velikov

30 October 2024 3	Rytas (Lithuanian Basketball Federation)	103–83	(Hungarian Basketball Federation) Falco-Vulcano Szombathely	Vilnius
19:30	Scoring by quarter: 28–18, 21–18, 24–27, 30–20
	Pts: Cole 19; Rebs: Tubelis 7 Asts: Cole 8 PIR: Cole 27	Boxscore	Pts: Perl 23; Rebs: Popović 8 Asts: three players 3 PIR: Perl 17	Arena: Twinsbet Arena; Attendance: 4,188; Referees: Luis Castillo, Kerem Baki, Andris Aunkrogers

13 November 2024 4	Falco-Vulcano Szombathely (Hungarian Basketball Federation)	72–82(OT)	(Lithuanian Basketball Federation) Rytas	Szombathely
19:00	Scoring by quarter: 15–21, 25–13, 17–19, 11–15, Overtime: 4–14
	Pts: Perl 22; Rebs: Keller 9 Asts: Keller 5 PIR: Pongó 18	Boxscore	Pts: Enoch 18; Rebs: Enoch, Radzevičius 10; Asts: Graves 5 PIR: Enoch 24	Arena: Arena Savaria; Attendance: 2,965; Referees: Yohan Rosso, Antonio Conde, Georgios Poursanidis

4 December 2024 5	Rytas (Lithuanian Basketball Federation)	94–84(OT)	(Italian Basketball Federation) Pallacanestro Reggiana	Vilnius
19:30	Scoring by quarter: 23–23, 23–22, 16–10, 19–26, Overtime: 13–3
	Pts: Graves, Radzevičius 16; Rebs: Masiulis 10; Asts: Graves 6 PIR: Radzevičius 23	Boxscore	Pts: Winston 26; Rebs: Gombauld 17; Asts: Winston 6 PIR: Gombauld 32	Arena: Twinsbet Arena; Attendance: 4,390; Referees: Ademir Zurapović, Boris Krejić, Martin Vulić

18 December 2024 6	Śląsk Wrocław (Polish Basketball Federation)	88–98	(Lithuanian Basketball Federation) Rytas	Wrocław
21:30	Scoring by quarter: 17–29, 27–22, 19–24, 25–23
	Pts: Nzekwesi, Senglin 19; Rebs: Nunez 5 Asts: Senglin 8 PIR: Senglin 24	Boxscore	Pts: Enoch 17; Rebs: Radzevičius 9 Asts: Cole 9 PIR: Tubelis 20	Arena: Centennial Hall; Attendance: 2,097; Referees: Zafer Yılmaz, Ventsislav Velikov, Orhan Cagri Hekimoglu

==== Round of 16 ====
===== Group J =====
Pos	Team	Pld	W	L	PF	PA	PD	Pts	Qualification
1	(Spain) Unicaja	6	5	1	550	503	+47	11	Advance to quarter-finals
2	(Turkey) Galatasaray	6	4	2	532	514	+18	10	Advance to quarter-finals
3	(Lithuania) Rytas	6	2	4	496	502	−6	8	
4	(Turkey) Manisa Basket	6	1	5	508	567	−59	7	

Source: Round of 16 Standings

==== Round of 16 matches ====
29 January 2025 1	Rytas (Lithuanian Basketball Federation)	86–66	(Turkey) Galatasaray	Vilnius
19:30	Scoring by quarter: 15–20, 19–17, 26–19, 26–10
	Pts: Radzevičius 16; Rebs: Enoch 10; Asts: Cole 5 PIR: Enoch, Masiulis 20	Boxscore	Pts: Livingston II 14; Rebs: Izundu 6 Asts: Livingston II, Palmer Jr. 4 PIR: Livingston II 14	Arena: Twinsbet Arena; Attendance: 5,919; Referees: Paulo Marques, Andris Aunkrogers, Péter Praksch

4 February 2025 2	Unicaja (Spanish Basketball Federation)	92–74	(Lithuanian Basketball Federation) Rytas	Málaga
21:30	Scoring by quarter: 20–15, 22–19, 22–27, 28–13
	Pts: Carter 26; Rebs: Díaz 6 Asts: Perry 7 PIR: Carter 25	Boxscore	Pts: Cole 15; Rebs: Radzevičius 6 Asts: Cole 4 PIR: Cole 18	Arena: Martín Carpena; Attendance: 7,014; Referees: Julio Anaya, Martin Horozov, Martin Vulić

5 March 2025 3	Rytas (Lithuanian Basketball Federation)	98–74	(Turkey) Manisa Basket	Vilnius
19:30	Scoring by quarter: 27–20, 27–22, 24–16, 20–16
	Pts: Cole 23; Rebs: Enoch 9 Asts: Cole 7 PIR: Cole 31	Boxscore	Pts: Lual-Acuil 21; Rebs: White Jr. 7 Asts: Chiozza 8 PIR: Chiozza 22	Arena: Twinsbet Arena; Attendance: 5,512; Referees: Wojciech Liszka, Ariadna Chueca, Saverio Lanzarini

12 March 2025 4	Manisa Basket (Turkey)	98–75	(Lithuanian Basketball Federation) Rytas	Manisa
19:00	Scoring by quarter: 28–18, 21–25, 23–16, 26–16
	Pts: White Jr. 25; Rebs: Lual-Acuil 13; Asts: Chiozza 11; PIR: Lual-Acuil 30	Boxscore	Pts: Cole 17; Rebs: Flagg 7 Asts: Cole 4 PIR: Cole 20	Arena: Muradiye Sports Hall; Attendance: 450; Referees: Petar Pesic, Michał Proc, Ventsislav Velikov

18 March 2025 5	Galatasaray (Turkey)	89–81	(Lithuanian Basketball Federation) Rytas	Istanbul
19:00	Scoring by quarter: 24–23, 14–13, 21–23, 30–22
	Pts: Cummings 22; Rebs: Izundu 8 Asts: Palmer Jr. 7 PIR: Cummings 20	Boxscore	Pts: Cole 25; Rebs: Radzevičius 7 Asts: Flagg 4 PIR: Cole	Arena: Basketbol Gelişim Merkezi; Attendance: 1,681; Referees: Julio Anaya, Lorenzo Baldini, Martin Vulić

25 March 2025 6	Rytas (Lithuanian Basketball Federation)	82–83	(Spanish Basketball Federation) Unicaja	Vilnius
19:30	Scoring by quarter: 18–24, 21–24, 28–23, 15–12
	Pts: Radzevičius 14; Rebs: Radzevičius 10; Asts: Jackson-Cartwright 4 PIR: Radzevičius 17	Boxscore	Pts: Carter 17; Rebs: Pérez, Tillie 5 Asts: Carter 6 PIR: Carter 23	Referees: Boris Krejić, Martin Horozov, Mārtiņš Kozlovskis

=== King Mindaugas Cup ===
==== Quarterfinals ====
21 December 2024 1	Neptūnas	67–78	Rytas	Klaipėda
17:00	Scoring by quarter: 16–24, 22–19, 18–15, 11–20
	Pts: Three players 13; Rebs: Pavelka 7 Asts: Buie 7 PIR: Pavelka 21	Boxscore	Pts: Masiulis 20; Rebs: Masiulis 11; Asts: Normantas, Sargiūnas 4 PIR: Masiulis 33	Arena: Švyturys Arena; Attendance: 2,111; Referees: Artūras Šukys, Gintaras Mačiulis, Darius Šomka

18 January 2025 2	Rytas	77–92 (155–159 agg.)	Neptūnas	Vilnius
18:30	Scoring by quarter: 23–23, 20–19, 18–25, 16–25
	Pts: Radzevičius, Tubelis 19; Rebs: Graves 8 Asts: Normantas 4 PIR: Radzevičius 20	Boxscore	Pts: Buie 25; Rebs: Pavelka 9 Asts: Three players 4 PIR: Buie 26	Arena: Active Vilnius Arena; Attendance: 2,271; Referees: Gvidas Gedvilas, Juozas Barkauskas, Gabrielius Simonavičius

== Statistics ==
=== LKL ===
Player	GP	GP	MPG	2FG%	3FG%	FT%	RPG	APG	SPG	BPG	PPG	PIR
Savion Flagg	40	11	21:27	60.5%	36.8%	44.9%	3.7	1.8	0.9	0.1	8.5	9.2
Margiris Normantas	46	6	20:50	51.2%	36.1%	78.9%	2.7	2.9	0.8	0.1	10.7	10.5
Jayvon Graves	42	19	16:46	48.2%	34.8%	65.4%	2.6	1.7	0.9	0.1	7.3	6.6
Parker Jackson-Cartwright	27	12	16:45	57.3%	35.9%	83.3%	2	4.2	1.3	–	8.6	10.4
Gytis Radzevičius	44	44	27:20	64.6%	38%	79.8%	5.9	2.3	0.8	0.2	12.2	17.5
Artūras Gudaitis	27	23	19:04	62.6%	100%	60.6%	4.4	1	0.3	1.1	8.4	10.4
Ąžuolas Tubelis	43	35	23:27	58.6%	35.6%	71.2%	6	1	0.7	0.7	12.7	14.4
Oskaras Pleikys	16	0	9:50	48.5%	11.1%	65%	2.4	0.8	0.2	–	3	3.9
Ignas Urbonas	2	0	13:05	75%	75%	–	2	–	–	–	7.5	6
R. J. Cole	45	22	22:21	51.6%	40.1%	83.8%	1.6	3.6	0.9	0.1	12.2	12
Gytis Masiulis	47	5	16:51	71.4%	38.2%	78.5%	3.6	0.9	0.6	0.6	8.4	10.5
Gantas Križanauskas	13	2	5:52	14.3%	26.7%	50%	0.6	0.5	0.2	–	1.2	0.1
Steven Enoch	40	22	15:51	60.6%	28%	78.3%	3.7	0.6	0.2	0.8	7	8
Ignas Sargiūnas	41	14	16:16	52.7%	36.3%	84.8%	1.8	1.5	0.5	0.1	6.7	6.6
Martynas Paliukėnas	44	24	12:08	57.1%	30.2%	61.5%	1.7	2.2	0.7	0.1	3.5	3.7
TOTAL				57.6%	36.3%	74.6%	38.7	20.2	7.4	3.1	92	106.5

Source: LKL

=== Basketball Champions League ===
Player	GP	MPG	2FG%	3FG%	FT%	RPG	APG	SPG	BPG	PPG	PIR
Savion Flagg	12	25:12	45.8%	27.9%	31.3%	3.5	1.8	0.7	–	7.9	6.5
Margiris Normantas	11	19:42	38.9%	28%	61.5%	2	2.5	0.9	–	7.1	4.4
Jayvon Graves	11	21:36	43.3%	25.8%	70%	3.2	3	0.7	0.4	9.4	8.5
Parker Jackson-Cartwright	4	17:06	41.2%	20%	87.5%	3	2.5	0.5	–	6	6
Gytis Radzevičius	12	31:12	62.3%	45.2%	78.8%	7.1	1.4	0.5	0.1	13.3	17
Artūras Gudaitis	2	7:30	50%	–	33.3%	2	–	–	–	2	1
Ąžuolas Tubelis	8	25:12	49.2%	20%	80%	6.4	1.5	1	0.6	9.9	12.4
Oskaras Pleikys	2	11:24	60%	–	50%	3.5	0.5	0.5	–	3.5	5
R. J. Cole	12	25:54	51.4%	43.9%	89.5%	3.1	3.9	0.9	–	15.1	16.3
Gytis Masiulis	11	15:36	61.3%	41.7%	70.8%	3.5	0.5	0.5	0.3	7.7	9.3
Steven Enoch	12	22:48	66.7%	50%	66.7%	6.2	0.5	0.6	1.3	9.9	14.3
Ignas Sargiūnas	10	13:42	61.5%	33.3%	73.3%	1.3	0.9	0.9	0.3	7	6.2
Martynas Paliukėnas	11	11:12	46.2%	55.6%	53.8%	1.7	2.6	0.5	0.1	3.1	5.7
TOTAL			52.5%	35.4%	70.3%	40.9	18.1	6.8	2.7	86.5	96.1

Source: Basketball Champions League
