= 2025 LKL Playoffs =

Basketball playoffs in Lithuania

2025 LKL playoffs
Tournament details
- Country: Lithuania
- Dates: 24–27 May 2025 (Quarterfinals); 29 May – 8 June 2025 (Semifinals); 11–18 June 2025 (Third place); 12–21 June 2025 (Finals)
- Season: 2024–25
- Teams: 8
- Defending champions: Rytas

Final positions
- Champions: Žalgiris (25th title)
- Runners-up: Rytas
- Third place: 7Bet–Lietkabelis
- Fourth place: Cbet

The 2025 LKL Playoffs known as the 2025 Betsafe-LKL Playoffs for sponsorship purposes was LKL playoffs' 30th edition. Top eight finishers in the regular season will compete for the championship spot. Playoffs will begin 24 May 2025. Rytas was the defending champion but lost final series to Žalgiris.

The quarterfinals were played in a best-of-three format with higher seeded team playing the first and third (if necessary) game at home. Semifinals, third place game and final were played in a best-of-five format, with the higher seed team playing games 1, 3 and 5 (if necessary) at home.

== Qualified teams ==
Pos	Team	Pld	W	L	PF	PA	PD	Qualification
1	Žalgiris	36	34	2	3286	2644	+642	Higher seed in playoffs
2	Rytas	36	29	7	3350	3033	+317	Higher seed in playoffs
3	7Bet–Lietkabelis	36	20	16	3006	2921	+85	Higher seed in playoffs
4	Wolves Twinsbet	36	20	16	3253	3209	+44	Higher seed in playoffs
5	Cbet	36	19	17	3221	3240	−19	Lower seed in playoffs
6	Uniclub Bet – Juventus	36	16	20	3073	3157	−84	Lower seed in playoffs
7	Šiauliai–Casino Admiral	36	14	22	3267	3417	−150	Lower seed in playoffs
8	Neptūnas	36	14	22	3050	3186	−136	Lower seed in playoffs

Source: LKL.LT

== Playoffs schedule ==
Schedule for 2025 LKL playoffs
Phase	Dates	Other dates
Quarterfinals	24–27 May 2025	24–29 May 2025 (Note: In case a third match is needed in the quarterfinals stage.)
Semifinals	29 May – 4 June 2025	29 May – 8 June 2025 (Note: In case a fifth match is needed in the semifinals stage.)
Third localize	11–16 June 2025	11–20 June 2025 (Note: In case a fifth match is needed in the third place playoffs.)
Finals	12–17 June 2025	12–21 June 2025 (Note: In case a fifth match is needed in the finals stage.)

== Notable events ==
- On 20 May 2025, all four 2025 Betsafe–LKL playoff matchups are set.
- On 21 May 2025, the schedule of the 2025 Betsafe–LKL quarterfinals stage has been revealed.
- On 26 May 2025, Žalgiris and Cbet became the first teams to advance to the 2025 Betsafe–LKL semifinals. Žalgiris finished the quarterfinal series against Neptūnas 2-0. In the other quarterfinal pair, Cbet closed the series also 2-0 against Wolves.
- On 27 May 2025, the last teams that go to the 2025 Betsafe–LKL semifinals are Rytas and 7Bet–Lietkabelis. Rytas finished the quarterfinal series against Šiauliai–Casino Admiral 2-0. Meanwhile, 7Bet–Lietkabelis closed the series against Uniclub Bet – Juventus 2-0 as well.
- On 27 May 2025, the schedule for the 2025 Betsafe–LKL semifinals stage has been revealed. Semifinals will start on May 29 and will last until June 4 if only 3 matches are needed. Otherwise, if all 5 matches are needed, then the semifinals may last until June 8.
- On 3 June 2025, the first team of the 2025 Betsafe–LKL finals has been determined, Žalgiris closed the semifinals series against Cbet 3-0. Cbet will fight for third place.
- On 7 June 2025, the dates of the 2025 Betsafe–LKL matches for third place and the final has been revealed.
- On 8 June 2025, the 2025 Betsafe–LKL semifinals stage has ended. Rytas won the series against 7Bet-Lietkabelis with a score of 3-2 and thus secured a place in the final. 7Bet-Lietkabelis will fight for third place against Cbet.
- On 18 June 2025, 7Bet-Lietkabelis won the 2025 Betsafe–LKL bronze medal by winning the series against Cbet 3-1.
- On 21 June 2025, Žalgiris won the last game of the final series against Rytas and won the 2025 Betsafe–LKL championship title. This is Žalgiris's 25th championship title.

== Bracket ==
Quarterfinals
1	Žalgiris	2
8	Neptūnas	0
4	Wolves Twinsbet	0
5	Cbet	2
2	Rytas	2
7	Šiauliai–Casino Admiral	0
3	7Bet–Lietkabelis	2
6	Uniclub Bet – Juventus	0

Semifinals
1	Žalgiris	3
5	Cbet	0
2	Rytas	3
3	7Bet–Lietkabelis	2

Finals
1	Žalgiris	3
2	Rytas	2
Third place
5	Cbet	1
3	7Bet–Lietkabelis	3

== Quarterfinals ==
Team 1	Series	Team 2	Game 1	Game 2	Game 3
Žalgiris	2–0	Neptūnas	88–75	98–70	—
Wolves Twinsbet	0–2	Cbet	102–103	98–102	—
Rytas	2–0	Šiauliai–Casino Admiral	127–81	110–84	—
7Bet–Lietkabelis	2–0	Uniclub Bet – Juventus	83–77	93–90	—

=== Žalgiris vs. Neptūnas ===
24 May 2025 Game 1	Žalgiris	88–75 (Series: 1–0)	Neptūnas	Kaunas
16:00 (EEST)	Scoring by quarter: 21–14, 22–20, 24–21, 21–20
	Pts: Smailagić 16; Rebs: Ulanovas 8 Asts: Brazdeikis 5 PIR: Ulanovas 26	Boxscore	Pts: Johnson 16; Rebs: Waterman 8 Asts: Buie 5 PIR: Waterman 19	Arena: Žalgiris Arena; Attendance: 2176; Referees: Jurgis Laurinavičius, Gabrielius Simonavičius, Darius Šomka

26 May 2025 Game 2	Neptūnas	70–98 (Series: 0–2)	Žalgiris	Klaipėda
18:30 (EEST)	Scoring by quarter: 22–22, 13–27, 17–27, 18–22
	Pts: Hesson 18; Rebs: Pacevičius 13; Asts: Johnson 7 PIR: Pacevičius 32	Boxscore	Pts: Francisco 17; Rebs: Birutis 6 Asts: Francisco 6 PIR: Francisco 21	Arena: Švyturys Arena; Attendance: 2822; Referees: Gytis Vilius, Gintaras Mačiulis, Andžej Urbanovič

=== Wolves Twinsbet vs. Cbet ===
24 May 2025 Game 1	Wolves Twinsbet	102–103 (Series: 0–1)	Cbet	Vilnius
16:30 (EEST)	Scoring by quarter: 30–21, 18–24, 25–26, 29–32
	Pts: Blaževič 24; Rebs: Blaževič 7 Asts: Cowan Jr. 11; PIR: Blaževič 33	Boxscore	Pts: Brewton 27; Rebs: Blyzniuk, Pleikys 7 Asts: Brewton 10; PIR: Brewton 40	Arena: Twinsbet Arena; Attendance: 1,522; Referees: Gvidas Gedvilas, Gintaras Mačiulis, Andžej Urbanovič

26 May 2025 Game 2	Cbet	102–98 (Series: 2–0)	Wolves Twinsbet	Jonava
18:30 (EEST)	Scoring by quarter: 25–26, 32–22, 22–18, 23–32
	Pts: Childress 22; Rebs: Blyzniuk 7 Asts: Childress 6 PIR: Childress 30	Boxscore	Pts: Miniotas 18; Rebs: Miniotas 5 Asts: Žemaitis 5 PIR: Miniotas 23	Arena: Jonava Arena; Attendance: 1866; Referees: Jurgis Laurinavičius, Juozas Barkauskas, Aurimas Borusas

=== Rytas vs. Šiauliai–Casino Admiral ===
25 May 2025 Game 1	Rytas	127–81 (Series: 1–0)	Šiauliai–Casino Admiral	Vilnius
16:30 (EEST)	Scoring by quarter: 28–17, 30–24, 37–22, 32–18
	Pts: Tubelis 15; Rebs: three players 5 Asts: Cole 7 PIR: Tubelis 23	Boxscore	Pts: Blakes 17; Rebs: Kulvietis 6 Asts: Singleton, Valinskas 3 PIR: Romančenko 22	Arena: Active Vilnius Arena; Attendance: 1918; Referees: Gvidas Gedvilas, Gabrielius Simonavičius, Darius Šomka

27 May 2025 Game 2	Šiauliai–Casino Admiral	84–110 (Series: 0–2)	Rytas	Šiauliai
18:30 (EEST)	Scoring by quarter: 24–34, 19–25, 22–31, 19–20
	Pts: Stankevičius 14; Rebs: Stankevičius, Kupšas 6 Asts: Buchanan 6 PIR: Kulvietis 17	Boxscore	Pts: three players 16; Rebs: Flagg 7 Asts: Cole 11; PIR: Graves 23	Arena: Šiauliai Arena; Attendance: 1537; Referees: Juozas Barkauskas, Gintaras Mačiulis, Dovydas Kairys

=== 7Bet–Lietkabelis vs. Uniclub Bet – Juventus ===
25 May 2025 Game 1	7Bet–Lietkabelis	83–77 (Series: 1–0)	Uniclub Bet – Juventus	Panevėžys
16:00 (EEST)	Scoring by quarter: 28–25, 18–21, 23–13, 14–18
	Pts: Maldūnas 22; Rebs: three players 7 Asts: Kovliar 9 PIR: Maldūnas 29	Boxscore	Pts: Beliauskas 18; Rebs: Mathon 8 Asts: Beliauskas 4 PIR: Beliauskas 21	Arena: Kalnapilio Arena; Attendance: 1713; Referees: Gytis Vilius, Juozas Barkauskas, Aurimas Borusas

27 May 2025 Game 2	Uniclub Bet – Juventus	90–93 (Series: 0–2)	7Bet–Lietkabelis	Utena
18:30 (EEST)	Scoring by quarter: 25–19, 26–23, 17–22, 22–29
	Pts: Brown 21; Rebs: Beliauskas 5 Asts: Beliauskas 5 PIR: Beliauskas 18	Boxscore	Pts: Kovliar 22; Rebs: Danusevičius 10; Asts: Kovliar 10; PIR: Kovliar 30	Arena: Utena Arena; Attendance: 2278; Referees: Artūras Šukys, Gvidas Gedvilas, Andžej Urbanovič

== Semifinals ==
Team 1	Series	Team 2	Game 1	Game 2	Game 3	Game 4	Game 5
Žalgiris	3–0	Cbet	73–61	98–74	86–78	—	—
Rytas	3–2	7Bet–Lietkabelis	86–82	73–76	87–86	76–87	94–70

=== Žalgiris vs. Cbet ===
29 May 2025 Game 1	Žalgiris	73–61 (Series: 1–0)	Cbet	Kaunas
18:30 (EEST)	Scoring by quarter: 16–17, 22–10, 14–25, 21–9
	Pts: Smailagić 16; Rebs: Brazdeikis 9 Asts: Francisco 8 PIR: Francisco 22	Boxscore	Pts: Brewton 18; Rebs: Pleikys 10; Asts: Brewton 4 PIR: Brewton 26	Arena: Žalgiris Arena; Attendance: 2483; Referees: Gytis Vilius, Aurimas Borusas, Dovydas Kairys

31 May 2025 Game 2	Cbet	74–98 (Series: 0–2)	Žalgiris	Jonava
16:30 (EEST)	Scoring by quarter: 18–26, 28–27, 13–31, 15–14
	Pts: Brewton 13; Rebs: four players 3 Asts: Brewton 4 PIR: Brewton 17	Boxscore	Pts: Brazdeikis 16; Rebs: Birutis 6 Asts: Francisco 7 PIR: Butkevičius 19	Arena: Jonava Arena; Attendance: 1925; Referees: Artūras Šukys, Saulius Račys, Andžej Urbanovič

3 June 2025 Game 3	Žalgiris	86–78 (Series: 3–0)	Cbet	Kaunas
18:30 (EEST)	Scoring by quarter: 28–25, 18–15, 22–18, 18–20
	Pts: Brazdeikis 15; Rebs: Butkevičius 5 Asts: Francisco 10; PIR: Francisco 21	Boxscore	Pts: Childress 16; Rebs: Blyzniuk 6 Asts: Blyzniuk 5 PIR: Blyzniuk 21	Arena: Žalgiris Arena; Attendance: 4349; Referees: Gytis Vilius, Jurgis Laurinavičius, Gabrielius Simonavičius

=== Rytas vs. 7Bet–Lietkabelis ===
30 May 2025 Game 1	Rytas	86–82 (Series: 1–0)	7Bet–Lietkabelis	Vilnius
18:30 (EEST)	Scoring by quarter: 27–24, 15–18, 23–24, 21–16
	Pts: Cole 15; Rebs: Gudaitis 7 Asts: Radzevičius 4 PIR: Gudaitis 24	Boxscore	Pts: Rubštavičius 20; Rebs: Danusevičius, Maldūnas 7 Asts: Gagić, Maldūnas 3 PIR: Rubštavičius, Maldūnas 16	Arena: Twinsbet Arena; Attendance: 3040; Referees: Saulius Račys, Jurgis Laurinavičius, Gintaras Mačiulis

1 June 2025 Game 2	7Bet–Lietkabelis	76–73 (Series: 1–1)	Rytas	Panevėžys
16:30 (EEST)	Scoring by quarter: 23–12, 18–21, 16–21, 19–19
	Pts: Rubštavičius 19; Rebs: Maldūnas 6 Asts: Bičkauskis 4 PIR: Bičkauskis 21	Boxscore	Pts: Radzevičius 21; Rebs: Tubelis 8 Asts: Jackson-Cartwright 3 PIR: Radzevičius, Normantas 21	Arena: Kalnapilio Arena; Attendance: 2864; Referees: Gytis Vilius, Gvidas Gedvilas, Juozas Barkauskas

4 June 2025 Game 3	Rytas	87–86 (Series: 2–1)	7Bet–Lietkabelis	Vilnius
18:30 (EEST)	Scoring by quarter: 20–14, 20–22, 15–23, 32–27
	Pts: Cole 17; Rebs: Radzevičius 9 Asts: three players 3 PIR: Cole 21	Boxscore	Pts: Kovliar 22; Rebs: Maldūnas 10; Asts: Kovliar 8 PIR: Rubštavičius, Danusevičius 18	Arena: Twinsbet Arena; Attendance: 3903; Referees: Artūras Šukys, Gvidas Gedvilas, Aurimas Borusas

6 June 2025 Game 4	7Bet–Lietkabelis	87–76 (Series: 2–2)	Rytas	Panevėžys
18:30 (EEST)	Scoring by quarter: 23–20, 20–18, 20–15, 24–23
	Pts: Gagić, Kovliar 16; Rebs: Gagić, Maldūnas 7 Asts: Maldūnas, Kovliar 4 PIR: Gagić 22	Boxscore	Pts: Cole 12; Rebs: four players 6 Asts: Cole 3 PIR: Cole 16	Arena: Kalnapilio Arena; Attendance: 3428; Referees: Gytis Vilius, Jurgis Laurinavičius, Juozas Barkauskas

8 June 2025 Game 5	Rytas	94–70 (Series: 3–2)	7Bet–Lietkabelis	Vilnius
16:30 (EEST)	Scoring by quarter: 24–17, 27–16, 24–26, 19–11
	Pts: Radzevičius 15; Rebs: Radzevičius 8 Asts: Cole, Jackson-Cartwright 5 PIR: Radzevičius 22	Boxscore	Pts: Rubštavičius 20; Rebs: Gagić 7 Asts: Bičkauskis, Kovliar 4 PIR: Rubštavičius 26	Arena: Twinsbet Arena; Attendance: 5,070; Referees: Gytis Vilius, Gvidas Gedvilas, Jurgis Laurinavičius

== Third place ==
Team 1	Series	Team 2	Game 1	Game 2	Game 3	Game 4	Game 5
Cbet	1–3	7Bet–Lietkabelis	90–83	85–104	78–92	73–81	—

11 June 2025 Game 1	7Bet–Lietkabelis	83–90 (Series: 0–1)	Cbet	Panevėžys
18:50 (EEST)	Scoring by quarter: 22–23, 21–17, 22–19, 18–31
	Pts: Danusevičius 14; Rebs: Maldūnas 8 Asts: Kovliar 6 PIR: Danusevičius, Maldūnas 15	Boxscore	Pts: Childress 21; Rebs: Blyzniuk 5 Asts: Childress 4 PIR: Childress 37	Arena: Kalnapilio Arena; Attendance: 1853; Referees: Jurgis Laurinavičius, Artūras Šukys, Gintaras Mačiulis

13 June 2025 Game 2	Cbet	85–104 (Series: 1–1)	7Bet–Lietkabelis	Jonava
18:50 (EEST)	Scoring by quarter: 21–17, 21–27, 20–28, 23–32
	Pts: Pleikys 20; Rebs: Kreišmontas 8 Asts: Brewton 7 PIR: Brewton 24	Boxscore	Pts: Gagić 20; Rebs: Gagić 9 Asts: Kovliar 8 PIR: Gagić, Kovliar 22	Arena: Jonava Arena; Attendance: 1818; Referees: Saulius Račys, Gvidas Gedvilas, Andžej Urbanovič

16 June 2025 Game 3	7Bet–Lietkabelis	92–78 (Series: 2–1)	Cbet	Panevėžys
18:50 (EEST)	Scoring by quarter: 16–18, 23–25, 24–13, 29–22
	Pts: Danusevičius 17; Rebs: Danusevičius 6 Asts: Three players 5 PIR: Danusevičius 25	Boxscore	Pts: Blyzniuk 20; Rebs: Brewton 9 Asts: Childress 5 PIR: Brewton 22	Arena: Kalnapilio Arena; Attendance: 2,165; Referees: Jurgis Laurinavičius, Artūras Šukys, Juozas Barkauskas

18 June 2025 Game 4	Cbet	73–81 (Series: 1–3)	7Bet–Lietkabelis	Jonava
18:50 (EEST)	Scoring by quarter: 22–15, 15–16, 19–31, 17–19
	Pts: Blyzniuk 20; Rebs: Pleikys 9 Asts: Brewton 4 PIR: Blyzniuk 23	Boxscore	Pts: Rubštavičius 24; Rebs: Gagić 8 Asts: Danusevičius 4 PIR: Rubštavičius, Kovliar 22	Arena: Jonava Arena; Attendance: 1595; Referees: Saulius Račys, Jurgis Laurinavičius, Aurimas Borusas

== Finals ==
Road to the final
Žalgiris		Round	Rytas	
1st place (34–2)		Regular season	2nd place (29–7)	
Opponent	Series	Playoffs	Opponent	Series
Neptūnas	2–0	Quarterfinals	Šiauliai–Casino Admiral	2–0
Cbet	3–0	Semifinals	7Bet–Lietkabelis	3–2

Team 1	Series	Team 2	Game 1	Game 2	Game 3	Game 4	Game 5
Žalgiris	3–2	Rytas	89–97 (OT)	83–79	80–86	84–83	76–69

12 June 2025 Game 1	Žalgiris	89–97(OT) (Series: 0–1)	Rytas	Kaunas
18:50 (EEST)	Scoring by quarter: 15–19, 17–22, 20–17, 21–15, Overtime: 9–9, 7–15
	Pts: Francisco 31; Rebs: Dunston 8 Asts: Francisco, Giedraitis 3 PIR: Francisco 29	Boxscore	Pts: Tubelis 21; Rebs: Radzevičius, Tubelis 8 Asts: Gudaitis, Sargiūnas 4 PIR: Tubelis 23	Arena: Žalgiris Arena; Attendance: 9281; Referees: Gytis Vilius, Gvidas Gedvilas, Gintaras Mačiulis

14 June 2025 Game 2	Rytas	79–83 (Series: 1–1)	Žalgiris	Vilnius
16:50 (EEST)	Scoring by quarter: 20–15, 13–21, 22–21, 24–26
	Pts: Jackson-Cartwright 20; Rebs: Tubelis 6 Asts: Cole 4 PIR: Jackson-Cartwright 21	Boxscore	Pts: Sirvydis 20; Rebs: Dunston, Smailagić 5 Asts: Francisco 4 PIR: Francisco 20	Arena: Twinsbet Arena; Attendance: 8,463; Referees: Gytis Vilius, Saulius Račys, Jurgis Laurinavičius

17 June 2025 Game 3	Žalgiris	80–86 (Series: 1–2)	Rytas	Kaunas
18:50 (EEST)	Scoring by quarter: 15–21, 16–28, 33–18, 16–19
	Pts: Francisco 19; Rebs: Birutis 6 Asts: Francisco 6 PIR: Ulanovas 21	Boxscore	Pts: Sargiūnas 17; Rebs: Tubelis 9 Asts: Cole 6 PIR: Tubelis 20	Arena: Žalgiris Arena; Attendance: 12205; Referees: Gytis Vilius, Saulius Račys, Artūras Šukys

19 June 2025 Game 4	Rytas	83–84 (Series: 2–2)	Žalgiris	Vilnius
18:50 (EEST)	Scoring by quarter: 24–15, 22–26, 22–13, 15–30
	Pts: Cole 22; Rebs: Tubelis 8 Asts: Cole 5 PIR: Cole 25	Boxscore	Pts: Francisco 29; Rebs: Birutis, Francisco 5 Asts: Francisco 7 PIR: Francisco 34	Arena: Twinsbet Arena; Attendance: 9,310; Referees: Gytis Vilius, Artūras Šukys, Juozas Barkauskas

21 June 2025 Game 5	Žalgiris	76–69 (Series: 3–2)	Rytas	Kaunas
16:50 (EEST)	Scoring by quarter: 15–15, 14–15, 21–25, 26–24
	Pts: Francisco 15; Rebs: Birutis 8 Asts: Francisco 7 PIR: Francisco 21	Boxscore	Pts: Jackson-Cartwright, Tubelis 16; Rebs: Tubelis 10; Asts: Jackson-Cartwright, Normantas 4 PIR: Tubelis 17	Arena: Žalgiris Arena; Attendance: 14,417; Referees: Gytis Vilius, Jurgis Laurinavičius, Juozas Barkauskas

2024–25 LKL champions
Žalgiris
(25th title)
