= Steven Enoch =

American basketball player (born 1997)

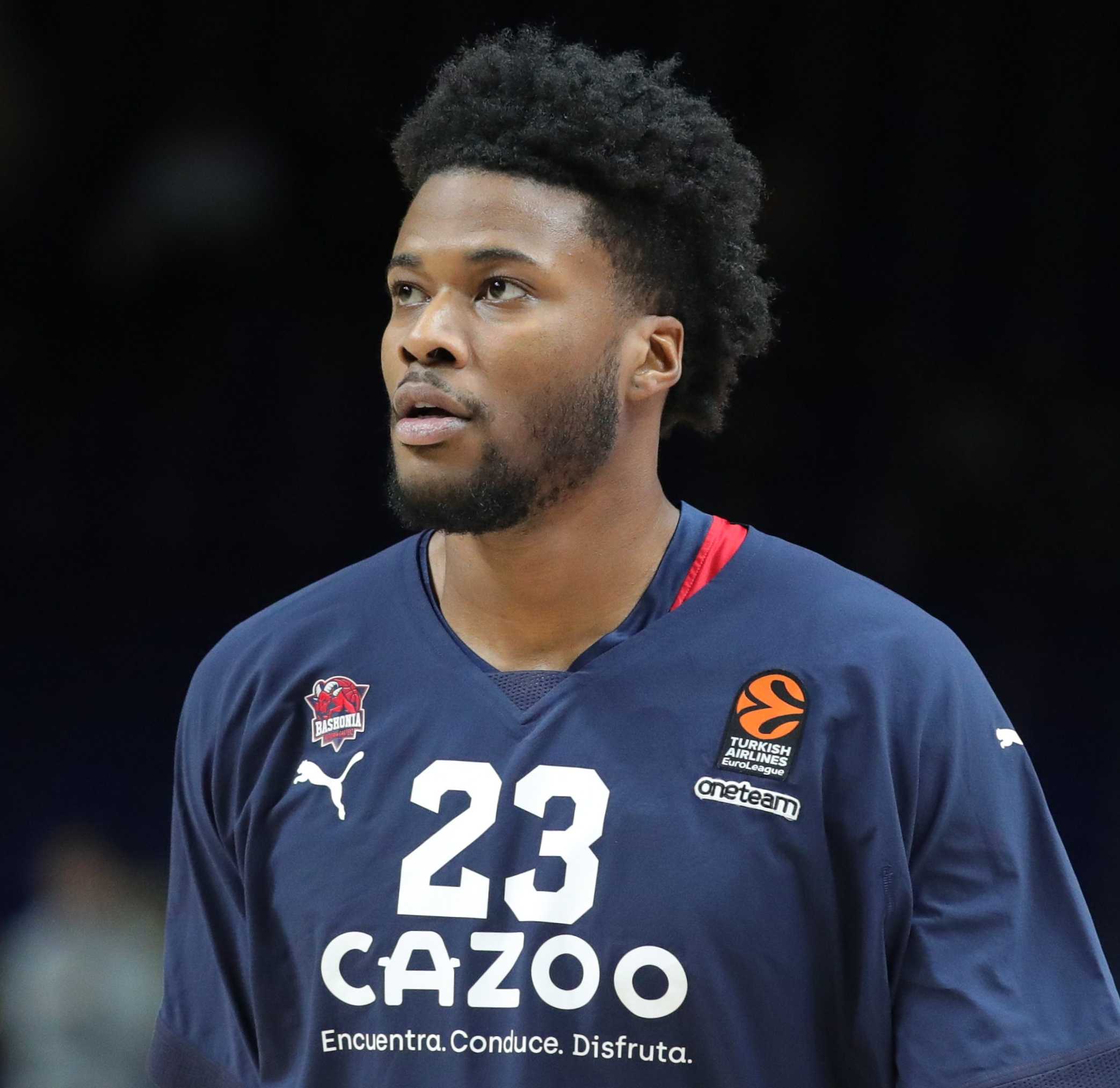
- Enoch with Baskonia in 2023

No. 23 – Karşıyaka Basket
- Position: Center
- League: Basketbol Süper Ligi

Personal information
- Born: September 18, 1997 (age 29) Norwalk, Connecticut, U.S.
- Listed height: 6 ft 10 in (2.08 m)
- Listed weight: 255 lb (116 kg)

Career information
- High school: Norwalk (Norwalk, Connecticut); St. Thomas More (Montville, Connecticut)
- College: UConn (2015–2017); Louisville (2018–2020)
- NBA draft: 2020: undrafted
- Playing career: 2020–present

Career history
- 2020–2021: Obradoiro
- 2021–2023: Saski Baskonia
- 2023–2024: Türk Telekom
- 2024–2025: Rytas Vilnius
- 2025–2026: Aris Thessaloniki
- 2026: Mersin MSK
- 2026–present: Karşıyaka Basket

Career highlights
- All-FIBA Champions League Second Team (2025)

Steven Coy Enoch (born September 18, 1997) is an American-born naturalized Armenian professional basketball player for Karşıyaka Basket of the Turkish Basketbol Süper Ligi (BSL). He played college basketball for the UConn Huskies and the Louisville Cardinals.

== High school career ==
Enoch attended Norwalk High School before transferring to St. Thomas More School for his senior year. As a senior, he was named Connecticut Gatorade Player of the Year after averaging 15 points and 11 rebounds per game and leading his team to the New England Class AAA semifinals. Enoch committed to UConn shortly after the team won the 2014 national title, choosing the Huskies over VCU, Virginia, Providence, UCLA, Seton Hall and Rhode Island. He cited his friendship with Andre Drummond, who he met at the age of nine.

== College career ==
Enoch played two seasons at UConn. He averaged 3.4 points and 2.3 rebounds per game as a sophomore, but saw his role shrink in the middle of conference play due to a right foot injury that caused him to miss five games. Enoch transferred after its first losing season in 30 years, joining Louisville on April 23, 2017. During his redshirt season, the program was hit with sanctions and coach Rick Pitino was fired, to be replaced by Chris Mack. As a junior, he averaged 9.4 points and 5.2 rebounds per game and helped the team reach the NCAA Tournament. Enoch had several good games towards the end of the season, scoring 14 points against Duke, 22 points against Boston College, and 14 points in the NCAA Tournament against Minnesota. Enoch considered turning pro after his junior season, but ultimately opted to focus on improving his game. As a senior, Enoch averaged 9.5 points and 5.6 rebounds per game, while shooting 54.1% from the field. Out of the last 22 games he played, Enoch scored in double figures in 12 games. Enoch scored a career-high 23 points versus Eastern Kentucky and pulled down a career-best 14 rebounds against Youngstown State. He posted 18 points in an overtime loss to Kentucky.

== Professional career ==
After going undrafted in the 2020 NBA draft, Enoch started his professional career by signing with Monbus Obradoiro of the Spanish Liga ACB on July 25, 2020.

On August 19, 2021, Enoch signed a two-year contract with Saski Baskonia of the Liga ACB. In two seasons with the Basque club, Enoch averaged 8.5 points and 4.8 rebounds in the Liga ACB, along with 7.6 points and 4.4 rebounds in the EuroLeague.

On July 2, 2023, he signed with Türk Telekom of the Turkish Basketbol Süper Ligi (BSL).

On July 29, 2024, Enoch signed with Rytas Vilnius of the Lithuanian basketball league (LKL) and BCL.

On August 9, 2025, Enoch signed with Aris Thessaloniki of the Greek Basketball League (GBL) and BKT Eurocup, for 2 years.

On January 25, 2026, he signed with Mersin MSK of the Basketbol Süper Ligi (BSL).

On September 4, 2026, he signed with Karşıyaka Basket of the Turkish Basketbol Süper Ligi (BSL).

== National team career ==
Enoch has played for Armenia in several international tournaments, having obtained dual citizenship, he has no Armenian ancestry but has trained in Armenia before traveling to tournaments. At the 2016 FIBA U20 European Championship, he averaged 17.3 points and 15.2 rebounds per game in Armenia's six games. In July 2017, he played in the FIBA U20 European Championship in Crete, Greece.

== Career statistics ==
Legend
GP	Games played	GS	Games started	MPG	Minutes per game
FG%	Field goal percentage	3P%	3-point field goal percentage	FT%	Free throw percentage
RPG	Rebounds per game	APG	Assists per game	SPG	Steals per game
BPG	Blocks per game	PPG	Points per game	**Bold**	Career high

=== College ===
Year	Team	GP	GS	MPG	FG%	3P%	FT%	RPG	APG	SPG	BPG	PPG
2015–16	UConn	27	0	7.0	**.543**	–	.429	1.5	.0	.0	.1	1.6
2016–17	UConn	29	3	12.1	.410	.000	.682	2.3	.1	.2	**.6**	3.4
2017–18	Louisville	Redshirt										
2018–19	Louisville	**34**	14	19.1	.528	**.359**	**.818**	5.2	.2	.2	**.6**	9.4
2019–20	Louisville	31	**28**	**20.4**	.516	.333	.740	**5.6**	**.4**	**.3**	**.6**	**9.5**
Career		121	45	15.1	.507	.343	.736	3.8	.2	.2	.5	6.2
