= Ignas Sargiūnas =

Lithuanian basketball player (born 1999)

- Sargiūnas with Fenerbahçe in 2026

No. 43 – Fenerbahçe
- Position: Shooting guard / point guard
- League: BSL; EuroLeague

Personal information
- Born: 11 September 1999 (age 27) Kaunas, Lithuania
- Listed height: 1.96 m (6 ft 5 in)
- Listed weight: 86 kg (190 lb)

Career information
- High school: Kaunas Jonas Basanavičius Gymnasium
- College: Georgia (2018–2019); Colorado State (2019–2020)
- Playing career: 2015–present

Career history
- 2015–2018: Žalgiris Kaunas
- 2015–2018: →Žalgiris-2 Kaunas
- 2020–2022: Prienai
- 2022–2023: Medi Bayreuth
- 2023–2024: Neptūnas Klaipėda
- 2024–2026: Rytas Vilnius
- 2026–present: Fenerbahçe

Career highlights
- FIBA Champions League champion (2026); Turkish Super Cup winner (2026)
Medals
Men's basketball
Representing Lithuania
FIBA U18 European Championship
Silver medal – second place	2016 Turkey	Team
Bronze medal – third place	2017 Slovakia	Team
FIBA Europe Under-16 Championship
Silver medal – second place	2015 Lithuania	Team

Ignas Sargiūnas (born 11 September 1999) is a Lithuanian professional basketball player for Fenerbahçe of the Turkish Basketbol Süper Ligi (BSL) and the EuroLeague. He played college basketball for the Georgia Bulldogs and the Colorado State Rams. Sargiūnas regularly represents the Lithuanian national team.

== Early life ==
Sargiūnas was born on 11 September 1999 in Kaunas, Lithuania and spent his childhood in Šilainiai eldership of Kaunas, where he enjoyed playing streetball in local basketball courts. He attended basketball practices since the first grade in the Kaunas Sabonis Basketball Center. Furthermore, he graduated from the Kaunas Jonas Basanavičius Gymnasium in Šilainiai.

== College career ==
In the 2018–2019 season he played for the Georgia Bulldogs of the University of Georgia in the National Collegiate Athletic Association.

In the 2019–2020 season he moved to the Colorado State University, however there he did not play for the Colorado Rams due to the redshirt rule.

== Professional career ==
=== Kaunas Sabonis Basketball Center and Žalgiris-2 (2015–2018) ===
In 2015–2018 Sargiūnas began his career while playing for the Kaunas Sabonis Basketball Center in the third-tier Regional Basketball League and BC Žalgiris-2 Kaunas, a reserve team of Žalgiris Kaunas in the second-tier National Basketball League.

=== Prienai (2021–2022) ===
In the 2021–2022 season Sargiūnas returned to Lithuania and joined the Prienai of the Lithuanian Basketball League where he played two seasons.

=== Medi Bayreuth (2022–2023) ===
In July 2022, Sargiūnas signed with the Medi Bayreuth of the premier German league Basketball Bundesliga, however the team results were poor as they finished last in the 2022–23 Basketball Bundesliga regular season, thus Medi Bayreuth was relegated to the German second-tier league ProA.

=== Neptūnas Klaipėda (2023–2024) ===
In the 2023–2024 season Sargiūnas once again returned to Lithuania and signed with the Neptūnas Klaipėda. By averaging 12.9 points per game Sargiūnas was the second-highest scorer of the team after Ąžuolas Tubelis (LKL MVP) and Neptūnas in the 2023–24 LKL regular season finished 6th out of 12 teams, however in the 2024 LKL Playoffs Neptūnas was eliminated in the quarter-final series 2–1 by Wolves Twinsbet Vilnius.

=== Rytas Vilnius (2024–2026) ===
In the 2024–2025 season Sargiūnas signed with the Rytas Vilnius, the champions of the Lithuanian Basketball League at the time. He performed well during the 2025 LKL Finals series versus his hometown team Žalgiris Kaunas, however Rytas Vilnius lost the final series 3–2 in an away game in Kaunas. Nevertheless, Sargiūnas during the 2025 LKL Finals said that it was a pleasure to play successfully versus Žalgiris Kaunas.

On 22 March 2026, Sargiūnas scored 43 points (9/9 three-pointers) and accumulated 58 efficiency points in a Lithuanian Basketball League game versus Lietkabelis Panevėžys. In this game he broke the Rytas Vilnius all-time single-game scoring record (previously held by Chuck Eidson, 41 points) and the Rytas Vilnius all-time single-game efficiency points record (previously held by Ivan Buva, 49 efficiency points). Moreover, in the Lithuanian Basketball League history this was the first time when a player in a single-game made nine three-pointers without a miss and the all-time fourth-highest single-game efficiency points performance, as well as the highest single-game efficiency points performance in 30 years. This season Rytas Vilnius won the 2025–26 Basketball Champions League, however after finishing second in the 2025–26 LKL regular season they were surprisingly eliminated in the 2026 LKL Playoffs quarter-final series 0–2 versus seventh-seeded Juventus Utena.

=== Fenerbahçe (2026–present) ===
On July 14, 2026, he signed with Fenerbahçe of the Turkish Basketbol Süper Ligi (BSL). In the start of the 2026–2027 season Fenerbahçe won the 2026 Turkish Basketball Presidential Cup. On September 25, 2026, he debuted in the top-tier European basketball league EuroLeague by scoring six points and grabbing one rebound per 16 minutes and helped Fenerbahçe to reach a 78–68 victory.

== National team career ==
Sargiūnas played for the Lithuania men's national under-16 basketball team in the 2015 FIBA Europe Under-16 Championship, where he averaged 8.7 points, 2.9 rebounds, 1.6 assists per game and helped the team to win a silver medal. Later he also represented the Lithuania men's national under-17 basketball team in the 2016 FIBA Under-17 World Championship, Lithuania men's national under-18 basketball team in the 2016 FIBA U18 European Championship, 2017 FIBA U18 European Championship and the Lithuania men's national under-20 basketball team in the 2019 FIBA U20 European Championship. Sargiūnas was one of the Lithuania youth national basketball teams key players in most of FIBA youth competitions he played, except in 2016 when he competed with one year older (mostly born in 1998) opponents and teammates.

In 2025, Sargiūnas was for the first time invited to the Lithuania men's national basketball team training camp and in his debut year was included into the final roster of the Lithuania men's national basketball team during a major tournament – EuroBasket 2025.

On 27 November 2025, Sargiūnas scored 9 points in the last 10 seconds, including the game winner at the buzzer, of Lithuania's game against Great Britain in the 2027 FIBA Basketball World Cup qualification.

== Honours ==
Domestic

- Lithuanian Basketball League runner-up – 2024–25
- King Mindaugas Cup runner-up – 2025–26

International

- Basketball Champions League champion – 2025–26
