= Mantas Rubštavičius =

Lithuanian basketball player

No. 17 – Tofaş
- Position: Shooting guard
- League: BSL

Personal information
- Born: 6 May 2002 (age 24) Panevėžys, Lithuania
- Listed height: 198 cm (6 ft 6 in)
- Listed weight: 84 kg (185 lb)

Career history
- 2018–2019: Lietkabelis Panevėžys
- 2019–2023: Žalgiris Kaunas
- 2019–2022: →Žalgiris-2
- 2022–2023: →Lietkabelis Panevėžys
- 2023–2024: New Zealand Breakers
- 2024–present: Žalgiris Kaunas
- 2024–2025: →Lietkabelis Panevėžys
- 2026–present: →Tofaş

Career highlights
- LKL champion (2026); All-LKL Team (2025); King Mindaugas Cup winner (2026)
Medals
Men's basketball
Representing Lithuania
FIBA U20 EuroBasket
| Silver medal – second place | 2022 Montenegro | Team |

Mantas Rubštavičius (born 6 May 2002) is a Lithuanian professional basketball player for Tofaş of the Basketbol Süper Ligi (BSL), on loan from Žalgiris Kaunas.

== Professional career ==
On 21 January 2019, Rubštavičius, being just 16 years old, debuted and scored his first points in the premier Lithuanian Basketball League as a member of his hometown team Lietkabelis Panevėžys. During the 2018–2019 season he played in five games for Lietkabelis.

On 17 May 2019, Rubštavičius had signed a long-term deal with the most titled Lithuanian basketball club Žalgiris Kaunas. Rubštavičius mostly was loaned to Žalgiris' reserve team BC Žalgiris-2 of the National Basketball League, however he has also played in some games for the primary Žalgiris team in the Lithuanian Basketball League and on 8 April 2021 debuted in the premier European basketball league EuroLeague by scoring 2 points per 2 minutes.

On 12 July 2022, Rubštavičius returned to his hometown team Lietkabelis by signing a 1+1 seasons deal, however Žalgiris retained a right to bring back Rubštavičius to their roster after the first season. During the 2022–2023 season he had averages of 7.1 points, 1.85 rebounds, 1.1 assists per 17:40 minutes in the Lithuanian Basketball League and 4.5 points, 1.5 rebounds, 1.6 assists per 14.8 minutes in the second tier European basketball league EuroCup.

In June 2023, Rubštavičius had signed a contract with the New Zealand Breakers of the premier National Basketball League (NBL). While representing the Breakers in the NBL on average per game he played for 19.9 minutes and averaged 9.5 points, 2.1 rebounds, 1.1 assists.

Rubštavičius went undrafted in the 2024 NBA draft, but represented the Golden State Warriors in the 2024 NBA Summer League.

On 29 July 2024, Rubštavičius signed yet another long-term deal with Žalgiris and was loaned to Lietkabelis for his third stint with the team. During the 2024–2025 season he had averages of 13.78 points, 3.09 rebounds, 1.89 assists per 25:34 minutes in the Lithuanian Basketball League and 12.4 points, 2.6 rebounds, 1.6 assists per 25.3 minutes in the EuroCup.

In July 2025, the return of Rubštavičius to the primary Žalgiris team was announced.

On November 9, 2026, Rubštavičius extended his contract with Žalgiris for a further 2+1 years. He was subsequently loaned to Tofaş of the Basketbol Süper Ligi (BSL) until the end of 2026–27 season.

== National team career ==
Rubštavičius played for the Lithuania men's national under-16 team in the 2018 FIBA U16 European Championship, averaged 5.1 points, 1.7 rebounds, 3.6 assists, his team was eliminated 78–80 in the Quarter-final by the Croatian national team, who subsequently won the tournament.

Rubštavičius role has significantly increased when he represented the Lithuania men's national under-19 team in the 2021 FIBA Under-19 Basketball World Cup during which he averaged 10.7 points, 3.9 rebounds, 1.1 assists, however his team was eliminated 79–84 after overtime in the Quarter-final by the French national team.

Rubštavičius' final appearance with the Lithuanian youth basketball teams was during the 2022 FIBA U20 European Championship when by averaging 19.7 points, 4.4 rebounds, 1.3 assists he has led the Lithuania men's national under-20 team to silver medals (the final was lost 61–69 to Spain). During the quarter-final versus the French national team, which was won by the Lithuanian national team 89–79, he scored 38 points and surpassed Lithuania's all-time record of most points in a U20 tournament game, which previously belonged to the Lithuanian basketball legend Arvydas Macijauskas (37). Rubštavičius was the top scorer of the tournament and was included into the All-Tournament Team.

On 23 February 2023, Rubštavičius debuted in the Lithuania men's national basketball team in an official game of qualification to the 2023 FIBA Basketball World Cup by scoring 12 points versus the Hungary men's national basketball team. He described the debut feeling as "truly incredible".

== Career statistics ==
Legend
| GP | Games played | GS | Games started | MPG | Minutes per game |
| FG% | Field-goal percentage | 3P% | 3-point field-goal percentage | FT% | Free-throw percentage |
| RPG | Rebounds per game | APG | Assists per game | SPG | Steals per game |
| BPG | Blocks per game | PPG | Points per game | PIR | Performance index rating |
| **Bold** | Career high |

=== EuroLeague ===
| Year | Team | GP | GS | MPG | FG% | 3P% | FT% | RPG | APG | SPG | BPG | PPG | PIR |
|---|---|---|---|---|---|---|---|---|---|---|---|---|---|
| 2020–21 | Žalgiris | 1 | **0** | 2.1 | .000 | .000 | **1** | .0 | .0 | .0 | .0 | **2.0** | **3.0** |
| 2025–26 | Žalgiris | **15** | **0** | **4.3** | **.318** | **.429** | **1** | **.6** | **.2** | **.1** | .0 | 1.6 | 0.5 |
| Career | | 16 | 0 | 4.2 | .318 | .429 | 1 | .6 | .2 | .1 | .0 | 1.6 | 0.6 |

=== EuroCup ===
| Year | Team | GP | GS | MPG | FG% | 3P% | FT% | RPG | APG | SPG | BPG | PPG | PIR |
|---|---|---|---|---|---|---|---|---|---|---|---|---|---|
| 2022–23 | Lietkabelis Panevėžys | **18** | 9 | 14.8 | .381 | .194 | .794 | 1.4 | **1.6** | .5 | .1 | 4.5 | 4.5 |
| 2024–25 | Lietkabelis Panevėžys | 13 | **10** | **25.2** | **.410** | **.275** | **.800** | **2.5** | **1.6** | **1.3** | **.3** | **11.9** | **10.9** |
| Career | | 31 | 19 | 19.2 | .400 | .250 | .798 | 1.9 | 1.6 | .8 | .2 | 7.6 | 7.2 |
