= Margiris Normantas =

Lithuanian basketball player

- Normantas with Bilbao in 2026

No. 2 – Bilbao Basket
- Position: Shooting guard / small forward
- League: Liga ACB; FIBA Europe Cup

Personal information
- Born: 27 October 1996 (age 30) Vilnius, Lithuania
- Listed height: 1.94 m (6 ft 4 in)
- Listed weight: 94 kg (207 lb)

Career information
- NBA draft: 2018: undrafted
- Playing career: 2014–present

Career history
- 2014–2015: KM Citus Vilnius
- 2015–2019: Lietuvos rytas Vilnius / Rytas Vilnius
- 2015–2017: →Perlas Vilnius
- 2017–2018: →Nevėžis Kėdainiai
- 2019–2021: Lietkabelis Panevėžys
- 2021–2025: Rytas Vilnius
- 2025–present: Bilbao Basket

Career highlights
- FIBA Europe Cup champion (2026); 2× Lithuanian League champion (2022, 2024); Lithuanian League Most Improved Player (2021); King Mindaugas Cup winner (2019)
Medals
Men's basketball
Representing Lithuania
FIBA U20 European Championship
| Silver medal – second place | 2016 Finland | Team |

Margiris Normantas (born 27 October 1996) is a Lithuanian professional basketball player for Bilbao Basket of the Liga ACB. Standing at 1.94 m (6 ft 4 1/2 in), he mainly plays at the shooting guard position.

== Early career ==
Before starting his professional career, Normantas played for KM-Citus Vilnius in the third-tier Regional Basketball League (RKL), averaging 15.9 points, 3.6 rebounds and 4.7 assists in the 2014–15 season.

== Professional career ==
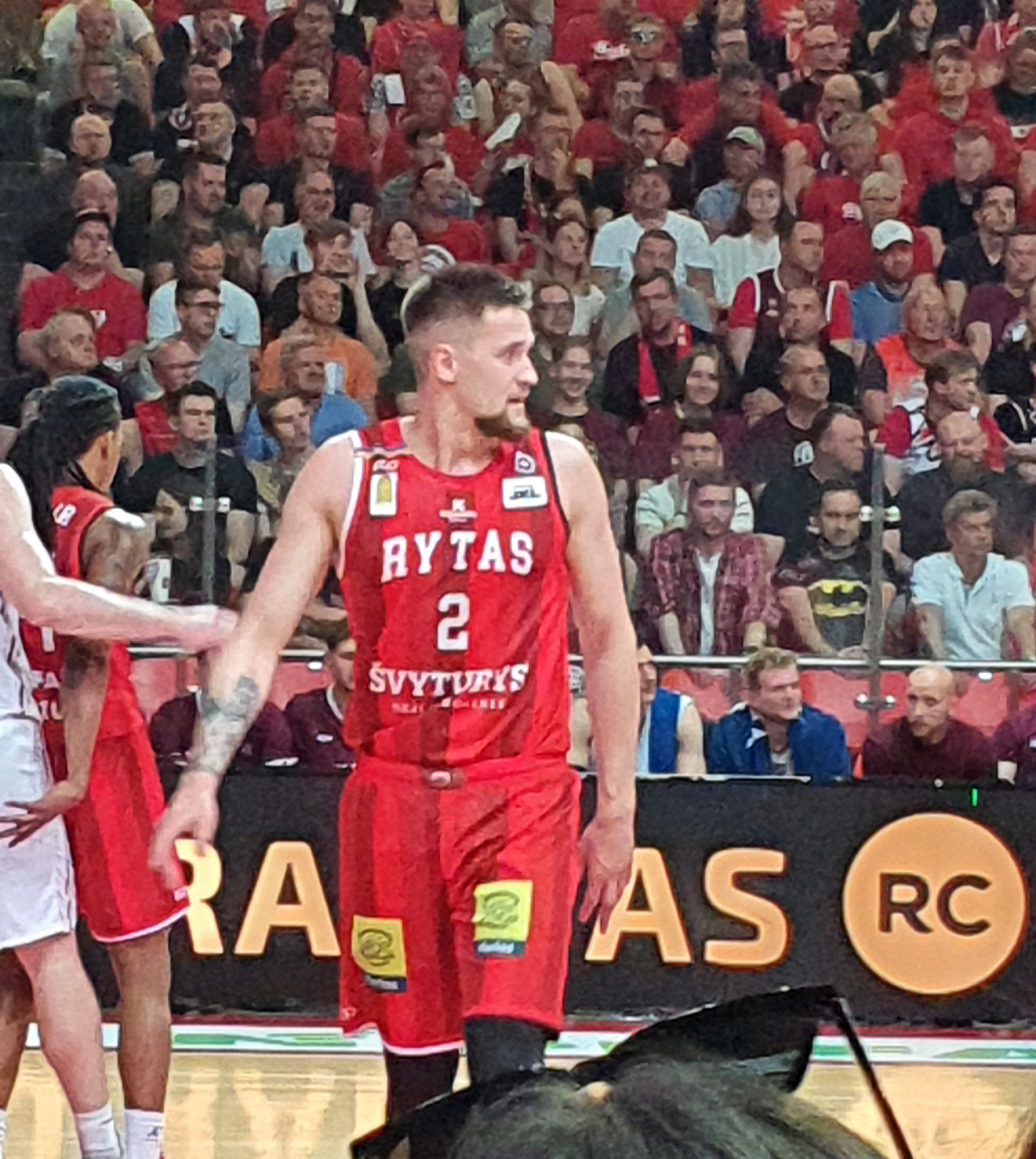
Normantas with Rytas Vilnius in 2022

In September 2015, Normantas signed a long-term contract with Lietuvos rytas Vilnius of the Lithuanian Basketball League (LKL) and was subsequently loaned to BC Perlas-MRU of the National Basketball League (NKL). In his first season with the team, he averaged 10.4 points, 2.8 rebounds, 3.0 assists and 1.8 steals per game. In the 2016–17 season, his production increased to 15.3 points, 3.7 rebounds, 4.1 assists and 2.1 steals per game.

On 22 December 2017, Normantas was loaned to Nevėžis Kėdainiai of the LKL. He spent the 2018–19 season with Rytas, though was never much of a rotation player and was released after the season.

On 28 August 2019, Normantas signed with Lietkabelis Panevėžys of the LKL. On 16 June 2020, his contract was extended for an additional year. In 47 games played for Lietkabelis in the 2020–21 season (in the LKL and the EuroCup), Normantas averaged 12.2 points, 2.5 rebounds, 3.3 assists and 1.6 steals per game.

On 15 July 2021, Normantas returned to Rytas Vilnius, signing a two-year contract.

In July 2025, Normantas started his career abroad, and signed a contract with Bilbao Basket of Spain's Liga ACB. On 27 May 2026, he was re-signed to a two-year contract.
