= DJ Brewton =

American basketball player (born 2000)

No. 23 – Bnei Herzliya
- Position: Shooting guard / point guard
- League: Israeli Basketball Premier League

Personal information
- Born: January 15, 2000 (age 26) Cincinnati, Ohio, US
- Listed height: 6 ft 3 in (1.91 m)
- Listed weight: 195 lb (88 kg)

Career information
- College: Alcorn State (2019–2020); Vincennes (2020–2021); Alcorn State (2021–2023); Cal State Fullerton (2023–2024)
- NBA draft: 2024: undrafted
- Playing career: 2024–present

Career history
- 2024–2025: Jonava
- 2025–2026: APU Udine
- 2026: Legia Warsaw
- 2026–present: Bnei Herzliya

Career highlights
- Polish League champion (2026)

Dominic Horatio Brewton III (born January 15, 2000) is an American professional basketball player for Bnei Herzliya of the Israeli Basketball Premier League.

== Early life ==
Born in Cincinnati, Ohio. Brewton attended Hughes High School, for whom he was named Second Team All-Conference as a senior.

== College basketball ==
Brewton played college basketball first for Alcorn State University for three seasons, averaging 12.0 points and 3.7 rebounds in 2022-23, when he was named All-Southwestern Athletic Conference First Team. He also played for Vincennes University in his sophomore year in 2020-21, averaging 9.2 points, 4.6 rebounds, and 3.0 points per game while shooting 45% from the field.

In his only season of college basketball with the Cal State Fullerton Titans in 2023–24, Brewton led the team in points (17.0), rebounds (4.8), and assists (2.4) per game. He finished the season averaging 26.6 points per game in the final seven games, along with 5 rebounds and 3 assists. On March 4, he was named the Big West Conference player of the week, and earned an honorable mention on the All-Big West Team at the end of the season. He graduated from the school in 2024.

== Professional career ==
His professional career began with the Jonava Jonavos basketball club in Lithuania. He won the 2024 Kėdainiai Cup with Jonava. Brewton averaged 14 points, 3.8 assists, 4.5 rebounds, and 3.8 steals in 28.4 minutes per game while shooting 47.8% from the field over 45 games. He was voted to the Eurobasket.com All-Lithuanian League All-Imports Team in 2025.

On June 23, 2025, Brewton signed with APU Udine of the Lega Basket Serie A (LBA) in Italy. In 2025–26, he averaged 9.1 points, 3.7 rebounds, and 1.3 assists per game, shooting 47.3% from the field over 15 games.

On January 20, 2026, he signed with Legia Warsaw of the Polish Basketball League (PLK). Brewton was the team's top scorer, as in 28 games he averaged 14.5 points, 4.0 rebounds, and 3.4 assists per game, as the team won the league title. He was named Eurobasket.com All-Polish League Honorable Mention and All-Imports Team.

On August 4, 2026, Bnei Herzliya of the Israeli Basketball Premier League signed Brewton for the 2026-27 season.
