= Active Vilnius Arena =

Basketball arena in Vilnius, Lithuania

- Mini OAKA, The Hangar
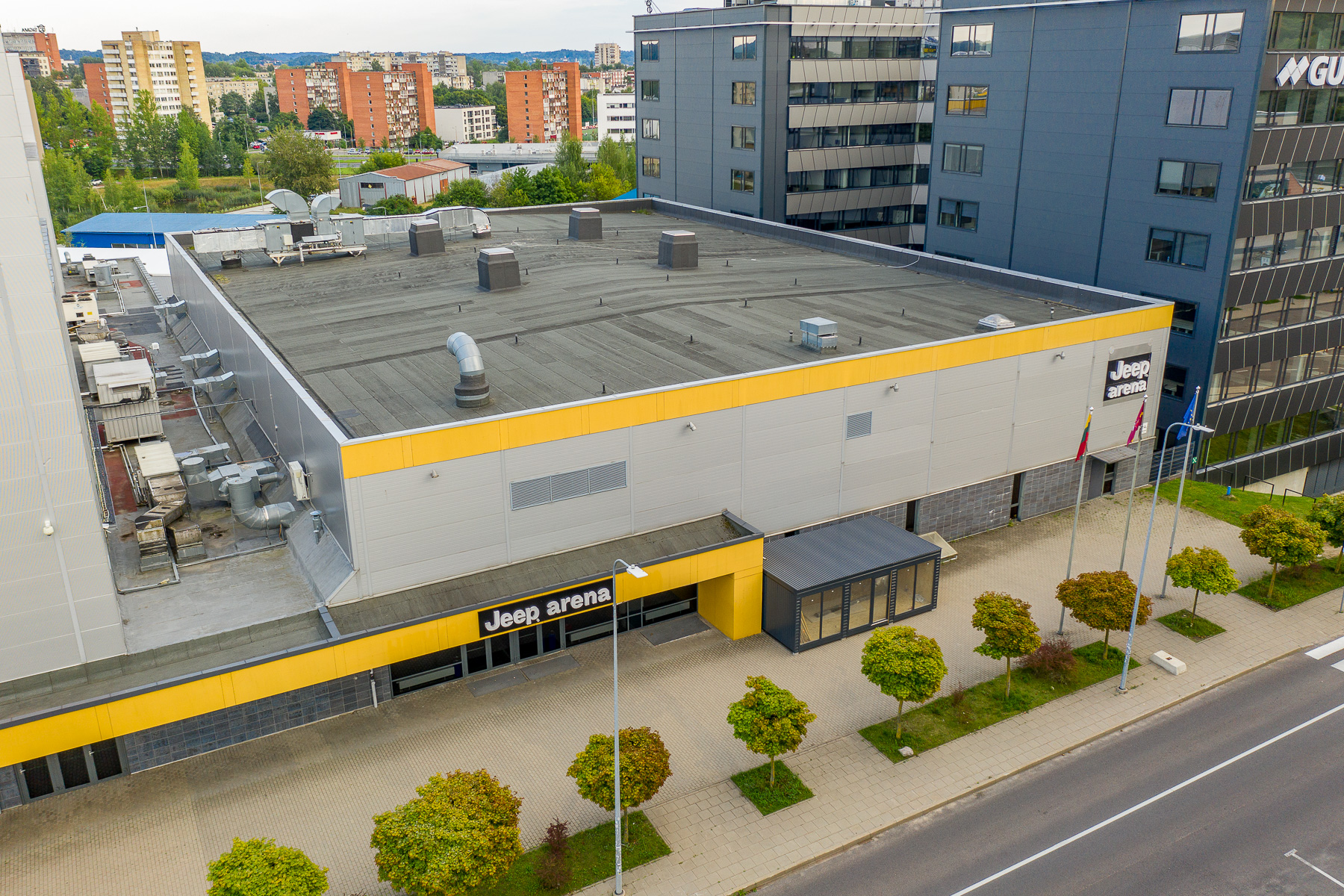
- Interactive map of Active Vilnius Arena
- Former names: Lietuvos rytas Arena (2005–18); Rytas Arena (2018–19); Jeep Arena (2019–24)
- Address: Ozo g. 14A
- Location: Vilnius, Lithuania
- Coordinates: 54.716°N 25.2789°E
- Owner: Vilnius City Municipality
- Operator: Active Vilnius
- Capacity: 2,051
- Record attendance: 2,741 (12 February 2020)

Construction
- Opened: September 28, 2005
- Expanded: 2014
- Cost: 2.3 million EUR

Tenants
- Rytas Vilnius; Kibirkštis Vilnius; Perlas Vilnius

The Active Vilnius Arena is a 2,051-seat basketball arena in Vilnius, Lithuania, built next to Arena Vilnius that is used mostly as a home venue of Kibirkštis Vilnius of the Lithuanian Women's Basketball League.

== History ==
In 2014, its capacity was expanded from 1,700 seats to 2,500 seats with the aim to host EuroCup games.

In 2021, the arena was bought from BC Rytas by the Vilnius City Municipality for €3.56 million.

After Avia Solutions Group Arena went into reconstruction in 2022, the arena became Rytas’ full-time home ground. Before the 2022-23 season, Rytas only played their home games in the Jeep Arena for Lithuanian Basketball League fixtures and used the bigger arena for Basketball Champions League home games.

== Tenants ==
More important or highly anticipated matches in the LKL, as well as all home fixtures in European competitions (such as the EuroLeague or EuroCup), are played in the Arena Vilnius. Women basketball team Kibirkštis Vilnius also plays in the arena. Past tenants include now dissolved Lithuanian and European women's basketball powerhouse TEO and Lietuvos Rytas daughter club Perlas Vilnius.

== Naming rights ==
Until 2018–19 LKL season it was known as the Lietuvos rytas Arena, when naming rights were sold to the Lietuvos rytas media group, title sponsor of arena's owners. After club was overtaken by new owners, the sponsorship was terminated and on 14 August 2018 the official name of the structure was changed to the Rytas basketball Arena. On 12 September 2019, the arena was renamed the Jeep Arena. In 2024, some time after the arena was bought by the Vilnius City municipality, the name was changed once again to the Active Vilnius Arena.

== See also ==
- Arena Vilnius
