= Gerry Blakes =

American basketball player (born 1993)

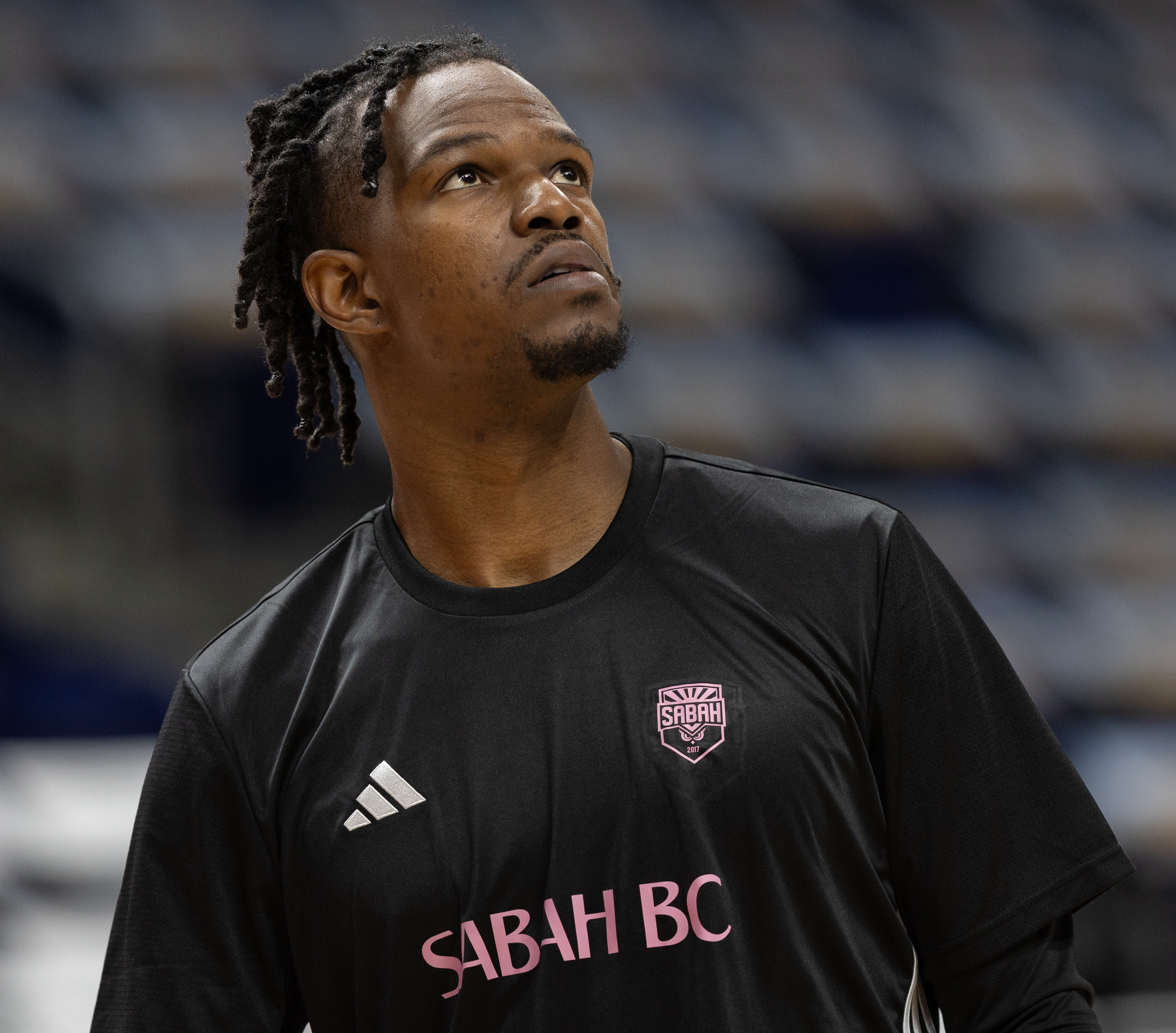

No. 4 – Sabah BC
- Position: Point guard
- League: Azerbaijan Basketball League; Champions League

Personal information
- Born: November 16, 1993 (age 32) Inglewood, California, U.S.
- Listed height: 6 ft 4 in (1.93 m)
- Listed weight: 195 lb (88 kg)

Career information
- High school: Leuzinger (Lawndale, California); Morningside (Inglewood, California)
- College: San Bernardino Valley (2012–2014); Arizona State (2014–2016)
- NBA draft: 2016: undrafted
- Playing career: 2016–present

Career history
- 2016–2017: Enosis Neon Paralimni
- 2017–2018: Norrköping Dolphins
- 2018–2019: Cantù
- 2019–2020: Oldenburg
- 2020: SIG Strasbourg
- 2020–2021: Cholet Basket
- 2021–2022: Limoges CSP
- 2022: VEF Rīga
- 2023: MKS Dąbrowa Górnicza
- 2023–2024: Cholet Basket
- 2024: Scafati
- 2024–2025: Šiauliai
- 2025: Hefei Storm
- 2025–present: Sabah Baku

Career highlights
- Swedish League champion (2018)

Gerry Royce Blakes (born November 16, 1993) is an American professional basketball player for Sabah Baku of the Azerbaijan Basketball League. He played college basketball for Arizona State.

== Early life and high school ==
Blakes was born and raised in Inglewood, California, and began high school at Leuzinger High School. At Leuzinger, Blakes was a teammate of future NBA point guard Delon Wright and came off the bench to help the Olympians win the California state championship in his junior season. He transferred to Morningside High School before his senior year.

== College career ==
=== San Bernardino Valley College ===
Blakes played his first two seasons at San Bernardino Valley College and was named the Foothill Conference Most Valuable Player both years and the California Community College Athletic Association co-Player of the Year as a sophomore after averaging 23.7 points per game.

=== Arizona State ===
Blakes played his final two seasons for the Arizona State Sun Devils. In his first season at Arizona State, Blakes started all but one of the Sun Devils' games and was second on the team with 11.2 points per game. He played in 66 games (62 starts) and averaged 11.1 points, 4.8 rebounds, and 2.1 assists per game.

== Professional career ==
=== Enosis Neon Paralimni ===
Blakes signed with Enosis Neon Paralimni B.C. of Cyprus Basketball Division A on October 12, 2016. He averaged 14.3 points, 6.2 rebounds (5th in the league), 3.1 assists and 1.5 steals over 20 games during the 2016–17 season.

=== Norrköping Dolphins ===
Blakes signed with the Norrköping Dolphins of the Swedish Basketligan on July 3, 2017. He averages 16.1 points, 7.5 rebounds, 3.0 assists and 1.1 steals in 40 games with Norrköping and was named Eurobasket.com All-Swedish Basketligan 1st Team.

=== Pallacanestro Cantù ===
Blakes signed with the Pallacanestro Cantù the Lega Basket Serie A (LBA) on July 16, 2018. Blakes averaged 12.3 points, 3.5 rebounds and 2.9 assists in 30 LBA games (seven starts) and 19.0 points, 3.8 rebounds, 4.8 assists, and 1.5 steals in four Champions League games.

=== Oldenburg ===
Blakes signed with EWE Baskets Oldenburg of the German Basketball Bundesliga (BBL) on June 20, 2019. Blakes averaged 10.4 points, 2.0 rebounds, 2.1 assists and 1.2 steals per game in nine BBL games and 12.3 points, 2.3 rebounds and 2.1 assists in ten EuroCup games before leaving the team in February 2020.

=== Strasbourg ===
Blakes signed with SIG Strasbourg of the French LNB Pro A on February 21, 2020. In one game, he had 16 points, 6 rebounds and an assist.

=== Cholet Basket ===
On July 24, 2020, he has signed with Brose Bamberg of the Basketball Bundesliga (BBL). On October 5, 2020, his contract with the team was terminated before playing in any competitive game. He signed with Cholet Basket of the LNB Pro A on October 29.

=== Limoges CSP ===
On August 2, 2021, Blakes signed with Limoges CSP.

=== VEF Rīga ===
On July 20, 2022, he has signed with VEF Rīga of the Latvian-Estonian Basketball League.

=== Return to Cholet Basket ===
On July 7, 2023, he signed with Cholet Basket of the French LNB Pro A for a second stint.

=== Scafati Basket ===
On February 2, 2024, he signed with Scafati Basket of the Lega Basket Serie A (LBA).

=== Šiauliai ===
On August 30, 2024, Blakes signed one–year contract with Šiauliai of the Lithuanian Basketball League (LKL).

=== Hefei Storm ===
On June 13, 2025, Blakes signed with Hefei Storm of the National Basketball League (China) (NBL).
