= Shaq Buchanan =

American basketball player (born 1997)

No. 2 – Panionios
- Position: Shooting guard
- League: Greek Basketball League

Personal information
- Born: January 30, 1997 (age 29) Madison, Mississippi, U.S.
- Listed height: 6 ft 3 in (1.91 m)
- Listed weight: 190 lb (86 kg)

Career information
- High school: Madison Central (Madison, Mississippi)
- College: Northeast Mississippi CC (2015–2017); Murray State (2017–2019)
- NBA draft: 2019: undrafted
- Playing career: 2019–present

Career history
- 2019–2021: Memphis Hustle
- 2021–2022: Memphis Grizzlies
- 2022: Memphis Hustle
- 2022–2023: Ironi Ness Ziona
- 2023–2024: Karditsa
- 2024–2025: Šiauliai
- 2025–2026: Elitzur Netanya
- 2026: Anwil Włocławek
- 2026–present: Panionios

Career highlights
- OVC Defensive Player of the Year (2019); First-team All-OVC (2019)
- Stats at NBA.com
- Stats at Basketball Reference

Leroy Shaquille Buchanan (born January 30, 1997) is an American professional basketball player for Panionios of the Greek Basketball League (GBL). He played college basketball for Murray State after transferring from Northeast Mississippi Community College.

== High school career ==
Buchanan is the son of Stephanie Latiker and has a younger brother, Shunn, who plays for New Mexico State. He grew up in Madison, Mississippi, and attended Madison Central High School where he was a standout basketball player. As a senior, he scored 23 points in the 6A playoffs to defeat defending champion Murrah High School. Buchanan was not highly recruited and chose to attend Northeast Mississippi Community College.

== College career ==
Buchanan averaged 14 points and 5.7 rebounds as a freshman at Northeast Mississippi and helped the Tigers capture the National Junior College Athletic Association (NJCAA) Region 23 title and reach the national tournament. Buchanan was a MACJC All-State selection as a freshman. As a sophomore, he averaged 18.4 points, 7.0 rebounds, 3.3 assists, 1.7 steals, and 1.5 blocks per game, shooting 45.8 percent on field goals and 31.5 percent from beyond the arc. Buchanan had his best performance in the NJCAA Region 23 title game with a career-high 34 points on 11-of-17 shooting. He was a NJCAA All-American and signed with Murray State.

As a junior at Murray State, Buchanan averaged 9.1 points, 3.9 rebounds, and 1.6 steals per game. He teamed with Ja Morant to lead the Racers to a 26–6 record and appearance in the 2018 NCAA Tournament. As a senior, Buchanan was named to the First Team All-Ohio Valley Conference as well as conference Defensive Player of the Year. He started all of his 33 games and averaged 13.0 points, 4.2 rebounds, 1.7 assists and 1.82 steals per game, helping lead the Racers to the 2019 NCAA Tournament. After the season, Buchanan competed in the Dos Equis 3X3 National Championship. As a 12 seed, Murray State defeated Marquette 83–64 behind 14 points and six rebounds from Buchanan. He finished his career at Murray State with 722 points scored, 110 career steals and 63 starts in his 65 career games. In two seasons at Murray State, Buchanan shot 48.4% from the field, 32.4% from behind the arc and 70.1% from the free throw line.

== Professional career ==
=== Memphis Hustle (2019–2021) ===
After going undrafted in the 2019 NBA draft, Buchanan joined the Memphis Grizzlies in the NBA Summer League. On October 17, Buchanan signed a one-year contract worth $898,310 with the Grizzlies. He was assigned to the Memphis Hustle of the NBA G League. On December 5, he had 10 points and five rebounds in a 116–110 win over the Northern Arizona Suns. On February 8, 2020, Buchanan scored a career-high 36 points to go with five assists, four rebounds and two steals in Memphis' 127–119 win over the South Bay Lakers. On February 29, Buchanan posted a career-high 18 rebounds to go along with 22 points and 6 assists in a 123–120 loss to the Salt Lake City Stars. He averaged 11.1 points, 4.8 rebounds and 1.5 assists per game.

Buchanan was added to the Grizzlies’ training camp roster for the 2020–21 season, but did not make their final roster. He re-joined the Hustle afterwards.

In August 2021, Buchanan joined the Grizzlies for the 2021 NBA Summer League and on September 23, he signed with them. However, he was waived on October 8, after one preseason game. On October 23, he re-signed with the Hustle. Buchanan averaged 18.7 points, 5.5 rebounds, 2.2 assists and 1.69 steals per game.

=== Memphis Grizzlies (2021–2022) ===
On December 25, 2021, Buchanan signed a 10-day contract with the Memphis Grizzlies, via the hardship exemption.

=== Return to the Hustle (2022) ===
On January 4, 2022, Buchanan was reacquired by the Memphis Hustle of the NBA G League.

Buchanan joined the Memphis Grizzlies for the 2022 NBA Summer League.

=== Ironi Ness Ziona (2022–2023) ===
On July 7, 2022, he signed with Ironi Ness Ziona of the Israeli Basketball Premier League.

=== Karditsa (2023–2024) ===
On August 11, 2023, Buchanan signed with Greek club Karditsa.

=== Šiauliai (2024–2025) ===
On August 14, 2024, Buchanan signed one–year contract with Šiauliai of the Lithuanian Basketball League (LKL).

=== Anwil Włocławek (2026) ===
On March 23, 2026, he signed with Anwil Włocławek of the Polish Basketball League (PLK) for the remainder of the season.

== Career statistics ==
Legend
| GP | Games played | GS | Games started | MPG | Minutes per game |
| FG% | Field goal percentage | 3P% | 3-point field goal percentage | FT% | Free throw percentage |
| RPG | Rebounds per game | APG | Assists per game | SPG | Steals per game |
| BPG | Blocks per game | PPG | Points per game | **Bold** | Career high |

=== NBA ===
| Year | Team | GP | GS | MPG | FG% | 3P% | FT% | RPG | APG | SPG | BPG | PPG |
|---|---|---|---|---|---|---|---|---|---|---|---|---|
| 2021–22 | Memphis | 2 | 0 | 5.0 | .250 | .000 | — | 1.0 | 1.0 | .5 | .0 | 1.0 |
| Career | | 2 | 0 | 5.0 | .250 | .000 | — | 1.0 | 1.0 | .5 | .0 | 1.0 |

=== College ===
| Year | Team | GP | GS | MPG | FG% | 3P% | FT% | RPG | APG | SPG | BPG | PPG |
|---|---|---|---|---|---|---|---|---|---|---|---|---|
| 2017–18 | Murray State | 32 | 30 | 27.4 | **.506** | .308 | **.704** | 3.9 | 1.1 | 1.6 | .4 | 9.1 |
| 2018–19 | Murray State | **33** | **33** | **33.3** | .468 | **.331** | .699 | **4.2** | **1.7** | **1.8** | **.5** | **13.0** |
| Career | | 65 | 63 | 30.4 | .484 | .324 | .701 | 4.1 | 1.4 | 1.7 | .5 | 11.1 |
