= Saulius Kulvietis =

Lithuanian basketball player (born 1991)

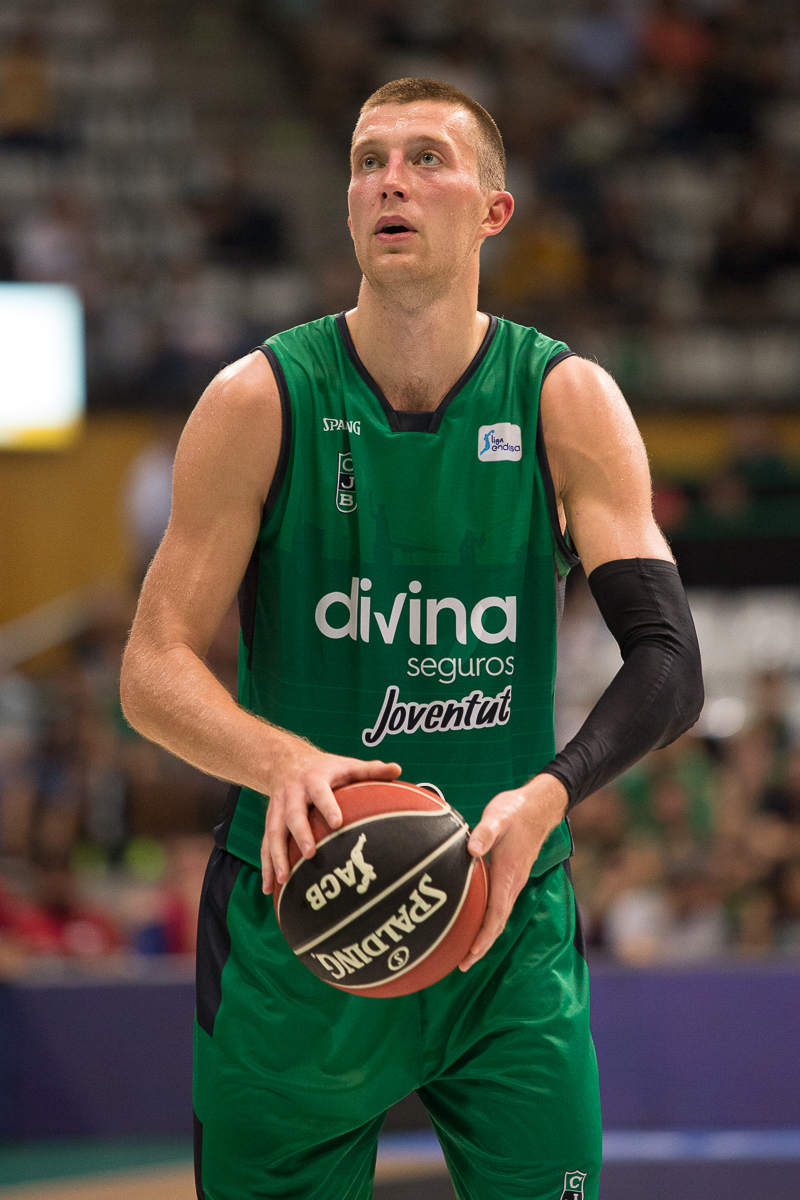
- Kulvietis with Club Joventut Badalona in 2017

KK Jurbarkas-Karys
- Position: Power forward
- League: National Basketball League

Personal information
- Born: February 14, 1991 (age 35) Kaunas, Lithuania
- Listed height: 206 cm (6 ft 9 in)
- Listed weight: 103 kg (227 lb)

Career information
- Playing career: 2008–present

Career history
- 2009–2012: Lietuvos rytas
- 2009–2011: →Perlas Vilnius
- 2011–2012: →Pieno žvaigždės Pasvalys
- 2012–2013: Sakalai
- 2013–2016: Juventus
- 2016–2017: Vytautas Prienai
- 2017–2018: Joventut
- 2018–2019: Lietkabelis
- 2019–2020: JDA Dijon
- 2020: Rytas Vilnius
- 2021: VEF Rīga
- 2021: MoraBanc Andorra
- 2021–2022: Telekom Baskets Bonn
- 2022–2023: Büyükçekmece Basketbol
- 2023–2024: Śląsk Wrocław
- 2024–2025: Šiauliai
- 2025–2026: U-BT Cluj-Napoca
- 2026-present: Jurbarkas-Karys

Career highlights
- LNB Leaders Cup (2020); PLK 3rd place (2024); Romanian Cup winner (2026); Romanian League champion (2025–2026); Romanian Supercup winner (2025–2026)
Medals
Men's basketball
Representing Lithuania
FIBA Europe Under-16 Championship
| Bronze medal – third place | 2007 Greece | National Team |

Saulius Kulvietis (born February 14, 1991) is a Lithuanian professional basketball player for Jurbarkas-Karys of the National Basketball League. Standing at 2.06 m (6 ft 9 in), he plays at the small forward and power forward positions.

== Professional career ==
On July 29, 2018, Kulvietis signed a one-year contract with Lietkabelis Panevėžys.

Kulvietis spent the 2019–20 season with JDA Dijon of the LNB Pro A, averaging 7.3 points per game.

On July 27, 2020, Kulvietis signed with BC Rytas Vilnius. On October 15, 2020, he left the team on a mutual agreement after not being able to play.

On April 1, 2021, Kulvietis signed with MoraBanc Andorra of the Liga ACB until the end of the 2021–2022 season.

On September 8, 2021, Kulvietis signed a one-year deal with Telekom Baskets Bonn of the Basketball Bundesliga (BBL).

On August 6, 2022, Kulvietis signed with Büyükçekmece of the Turkish Basketball Super League (BSL).

On August 6, 2023, he signed with Śląsk Wrocław of the PLK.

On August 20, 2024, Kulvietis signed one–year contract with Šiauliai of the Lithuanian Basketball League (LKL).
