= Gytis Radzevičius =

Lithuanian basketball player

- Radzevičius with the Lithuania national team

No. 7 – Rytas Vilnius
- Position: Small forward / Shooting guard
- League: LKL; BCL

Personal information
- Born: 17 July 1995 (age 31) Vilnius, Lithuania
- Listed height: 197 cm (6 ft 6 in)
- Listed weight: 92 kg (203 lb)

Career information
- Playing career: 2014–present

Career history
- 2014–2015: Kupiškis
- 2015–2017: Perlas
- 2017–2018: Vytis
- 2018–2020: Juventus Utena
- 2020–2025: Rytas Vilnius
- 2025–2026: Baskonia
- 2026–present: Rytas Vilnius

Career highlights
- 2× Lithuanian League champion (2022, 2024); Spanish Cup winner (2026); All-LKL Team (2025)

Gytis Radzevičius (born 17 July 1995) is a Lithuanian professional basketball player for Rytas Vilnius of the Lithuanian Basketball League (LKL) and the Basketball Champions League (BCL).

== Playing career ==
Radzevičius started his professional career in KK Kupiškis basketball team.

He moved to National Basketball league in 2015–16 season, when he signed with BC Perlas. He spent the 2019–20 season with Juventus Utena where he averaged 11.7 points and 5.5 rebounds per game. On 29 July 2020, Radzevičius signed with Rytas Vilnius.

On 3 December 2025, Lithuanian national-team player Radzevičius left Rytas Vilnius to sign with EuroLeague side Baskonia Vitoria‑Gasteiz, marking the next step of his professional career.

On 29 June 2026, Radzevičius came back and signed new three–year contract with Rytas Vilnius of the Lithuanian Basketball League (LKL) and the Basketball Champions League (BCL).

== National team career ==
Radzevičius represented the Lithuania men's national basketball team during the 2023 FIBA Basketball World Cup qualification and EuroBasket 2025 qualification.

In 2025, Radzevičius was for the first time included into the final roster of the Lithuania men's national basketball team during a major tournament – EuroBasket 2025.
