= R. J. Cole =

American basketball player (born 1999)

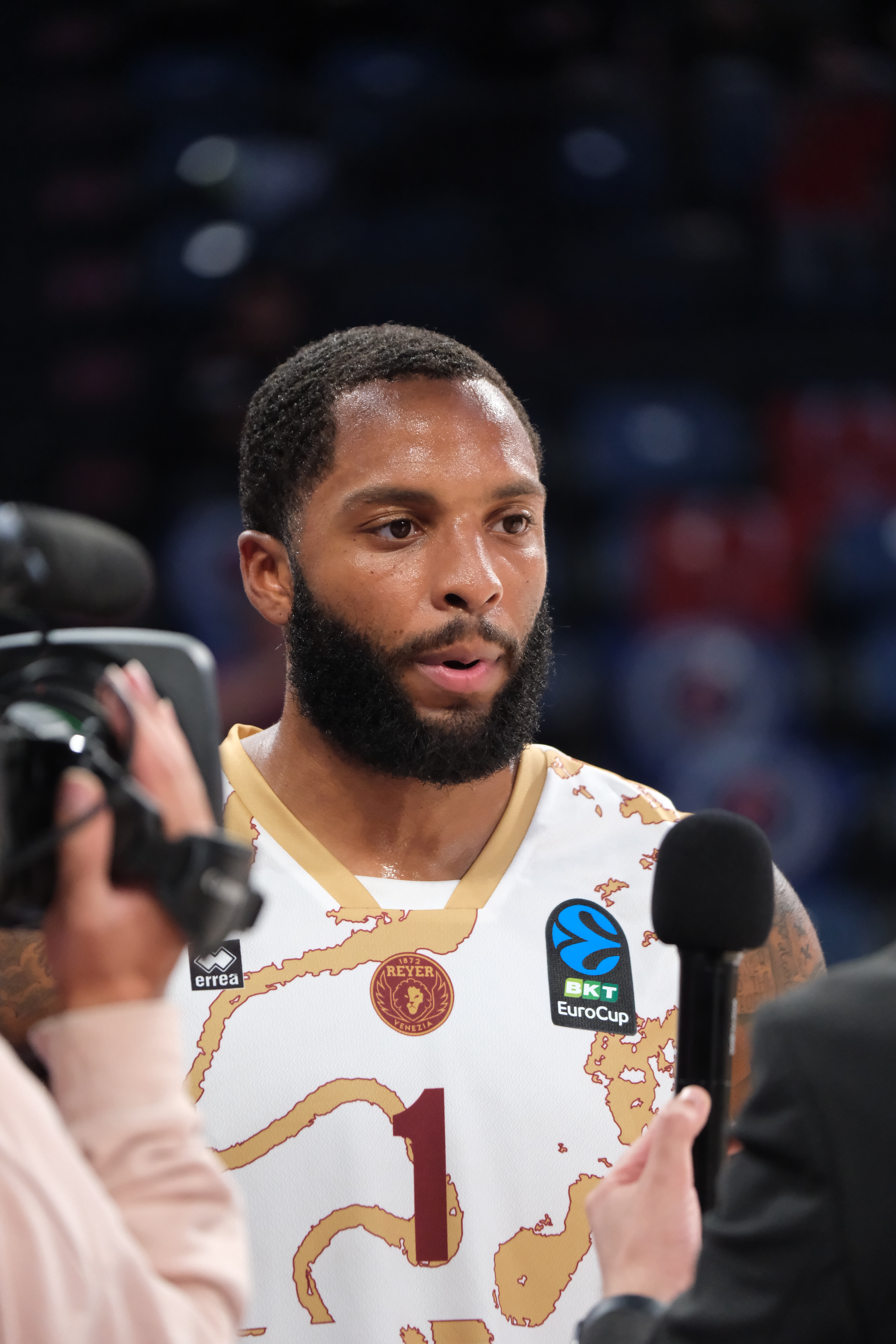
- Cole with Reyer Venezia in 2025

No. 2 – Olimpia Milano
- Position: Point guard
- League: LBA; EuroLeague

Personal information
- Born: August 24, 1999 (age 27) Union City, New Jersey, U.S.
- Listed height: 6 ft 1 in (1.85 m)
- Listed weight: 185 lb (84 kg)

Career information
- High school: St. Anthony (Jersey City, New Jersey)
- College: Howard (2017–2019); UConn (2020–2022)
- NBA draft: 2022: undrafted
- Playing career: 2022–present

Career history
- 2022–2023: Lavrio
- 2023: Löwen Braunschweig
- 2023–2025: Rytas Vilnius
- 2025–2026: Reyer Venezia
- 2026–present: Olimpia Milano

Career highlights
- Italian Supercup winner (2026); Lithuanian League champion (2024); First-team All-Big East (2022); AP Honorable Mention All-American (2019); MEAC Player of the Year (2019); 2× First–team All-MEAC (2018, 2019); MEAC Rookie of the Year (2018)

Robert Jalen Cole (born August 24, 1999) is an American professional basketball player for Olimpia Milano of the Italian Lega Basket Serie A (LBA) and the EuroLeague. He played college basketball for the Howard Bison and the UConn Huskies.

== Early life ==
Cole attended basketball powerhouse St. Anthony High School. He was ranked a three-star prospect and maintained a 4.0 grade point average. Cole turned down offers from Boston University and Monmouth to play at Howard, where he believed he could make an immediate impact.

== College career ==
As a freshman at Howard, Cole averaged 23.7 points per game and 6.2 assists per game, leading the Mid-Eastern Athletic Conference in both categories. He scored 42 against UNC Wilmington on December 22, 2017; one of his five games in excess of 30 points. Cole was named to the First Team All-MEAC and MEAC Rookie of the Year.

As a sophomore, Cole was named MEAC Player of the Week on five occasions. He had a season-high 36 points in the regular-season finale versus Norfolk State. Cole led the MEAC in scoring with 21.4 points per game. He was named the MEAC Player of the Year and was an Associated Press Honorable Mention All-American. Cole led Howard to the College Basketball Invitational, where the team fell to Coastal Carolina despite 14 points, 12 rebounds, 8 assists and 3 steals from Cole. After the season, Cole declared for the 2019 NBA draft but did not hire an agent, which left him with the option to withdraw from the draft and return to school for his junior year.

After withdrawing from the draft, Cole transferred to the University of Connecticut (UConn). He chose UConn over Alabama and Seton Hall. As a junior, Cole averaged 12.2 points, 4.3 assists, and three rebounds per game in a complementary role to James Bouknight.

On December 21, 2021, Cole reached 2,000 career points in a win against Marquette. He was named to the First Team All-Big East.

== Professional career ==
On July 22, 2022, Cole signed his first professional contract with Greek club Lavrio. In 20 GBL games, he averaged 13.8 points, 3.1 rebounds, 4.6 assists and 1 steal, playing around 30 minutes per contest.

On March 31, 2023, Cole moved to German club Löwen Braunschweig for the rest of the season.

On July 26, 2023, Cole signed a two-year (1+1) contract with Rytas Vilnius of the Lithuanian Basketball League (LKL).

On June 30, 2025, Cole signed with Umana Reyer Venezia of the Italian Lega Basket Serie A (LBA).

On July 8, 2026, Cole signed with Olimpia Milano of the Lega Basket Serie A (LBA) and the EuroLeague.

== Career statistics ==
Legend
GP	Games played	GS	Games started	MPG	Minutes per game
FG%	Field goal percentage	3P%	3-point field goal percentage	FT%	Free throw percentage
RPG	Rebounds per game	APG	Assists per game	SPG	Steals per game
BPG	Blocks per game	PPG	Points per game	**Bold**	Career high

=== College ===
Year	Team	GP	GS	MPG	FG%	3P%	FT%	RPG	APG	SPG	BPG	PPG
2017–18	Howard	33	32	**37.9**	.394	.359	.770	3.9	6.1	1.7	.0	**23.7**
2018–19	Howard	**34**	**33**	35.6	**.415**	**.387**	.819	**4.1**	**6.4**	**1.9**	.0	21.4
2019–20	UConn	Redshirt										
2020–21	UConn	23	21	31.1	.387	.386	.770	3.0	4.3	1.2	.0	12.2
2021–22	UConn	33	**33**	33.5	**.415**	.339	**.858**	3.4	4.1	1.1	**.1**	15.8
Career		123	119	34.8	.404	.366	.804	3.7	5.3	1.5	.0	18.8

=== Domestic leagues ===
Year	Team	League	GP	MPG	FG%	3P%	FT%	RPG	APG	SPG	BPG	PPG
2022–23	Lavrio	GBL	20	30.2	.371	.320	.880	3.2	4.7	1.1	0.1	13.8
2023–24	Rytas Vilnius	LKL	39	22.2	.444	.328	.873	1.9	4.1	1.2	0.0	10.4
2024–25	Rytas Vilnius	LKL	45	22.2	.466	.401	.838	1.6	3.6	0.9	0.1	12.2
