= Savion Flagg =

American basketball player (born 1999)

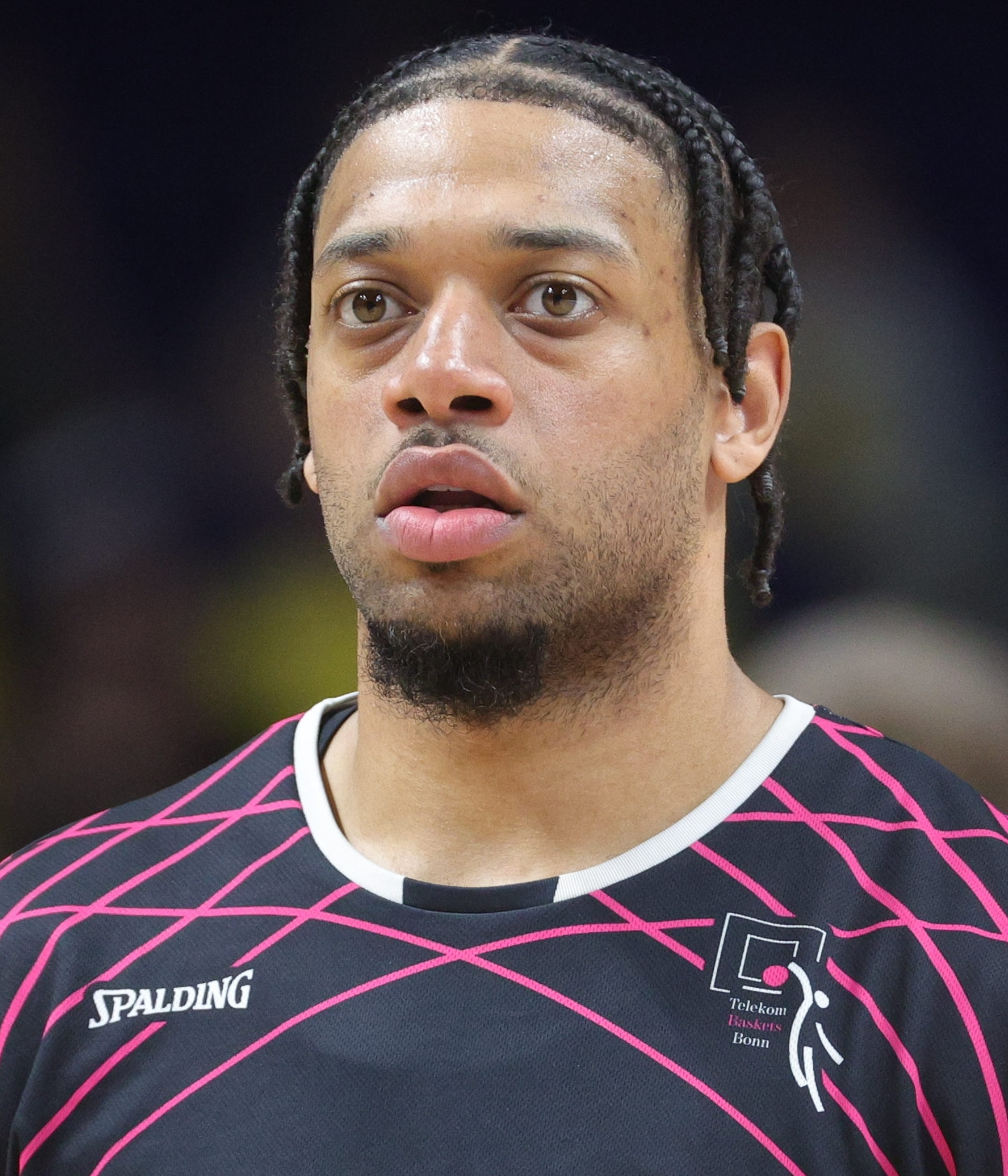
- Flagg with Bonn in 2024

No. 1 – Pallacanestro Cantù
- Position: Small forward / power forward
- League: LBA

Personal information
- Born: May 26, 1999 (age 27) Alvin, Texas, U.S.
- Listed height: 6 ft 7 in (2.01 m)
- Listed weight: 225 lb (102 kg)

Career information
- High school: Alvin (Alvin, Texas)
- College: Texas A&M (2017–2021); Sam Houston State (2021–2022)
- NBA draft: 2022: undrafted
- Playing career: 2022–present

Career history
- 2022–2023: Lavrio
- 2023–2024: Telekom Baskets Bonn
- 2024–2025: Rytas Vilnius
- 2025–2026: Napoli Basket
- 2026–present: Pallacanestro Cantù

Career highlights
- First-team All-WAC (2022); WAC All-Newcomer team (2022)

Savion Deon Flagg (born May 26, 1999) is an American professional basketball player for Pallacanestro Cantù of the Italian Lega Basket Serie A (LBA). He played college basketball for the Texas A&M Aggies and the Sam Houston State Bearkats.

== Early life ==
Flagg attended Alvin High School. During his final year, he averaged 31.3 points, 11.1 rebounds and 5.9 assists per game. He was one of only three Houston area players to tally over 1,000 points in a season. Flagg scored over 2,400 points during his high school career. He was a member of ESPN elite Top 100 list.

== College career ==
=== Texas A&M (2017-2021) ===
In November 2016, Flagg signed with Texas A&M to begin his college career. During his freshman season, he played in 30 games and started in 5. He had 4.1 points and 3.4 rebounds per game. Flagg was named SEC Freshman of the Week on December 26th after averaging 16.5 points and 9.5 rebounds.

During his sophomore season, he played in and started all 32 games. He led the team in scoring and rebounding and was second in assists. In February 2019, Flagg was named SEC Player of the Week after averaging 20 points, 9 rebounds and 2.5 assists in two wins that week. In April 2019, Flagg announced on his social media that he had put his name in the NBA Draft to test the waters. In May 2019, Flagg tested the NBA Draft waters, but eventually decided to return to Texas A&M for his sophomore season.

During his junior year, he played in 30 games and made 29 starts. In his senior season he played in 17 games and made 8 starts. He finished second on the team in rebounding with 4.5 per game, 39 assists and 6 blocks.

=== Sam Houston State University (2021-2022) ===
In April 2021, Flagg announced he was transferring to Sam Houston State University for his final year of eligibility.

During his final season, he played and started in 32 games. He averaged 18.6 points, 8.1 rebounds, and 2.2 assists per game. In March 2022, Flagg was named the 2022 NABC Division I All-District Teams. He was voted to the District 6 first team and was the third leading scorer in the WAC. Flagg was named to the 2021-2022 Lou Henson All-America Team.

In April 2022, Flagg was invited to participate in the Portsmouth Invitational Tournament. Flagg also participated in the Tampa Bay Pro Combine.

== Professional career ==
On July 15, 2022, Flagg signed his first professional contract with Greek club Lavrio. In 21 league games, he averaged 14.5 points, 7.2 rebounds and 3.8 assists, playing around 33 minutes per contest.

In June 2023, the Phoenix Suns announced their roster for NBA Summer League and Flagg was on the roster.

In August, 2023, Flagg signed a contract with the Telekom Baskets Bonn of the easycredit BBL.

On July 26, 2025, Flagg signed one–year contract with Napoli Basket of the Italian Lega Basket Serie A (LBA).

== Personal life ==
Flagg's cousin is Jonathan Babineaux.
