= 2021 LKL Playoffs =

2021 LKL playoffs
Tournament details
- Dates: 12 May 2021 – 22 May 2021 (Quarter-finals); 24 May 2021 – 30 May 2021 (Semi-finals); 1 June 2021 – 11 June 2021 (Third place); 2 June 2021 – 7 June 2021 (Final)
- Season: 2020–21
- Teams: 8
- Defending champions: BC Žalgiris

Final positions
- Champions: Žalgiris (23rd title)
- Runners-up: Rytas

The 2021 LKL Playoffs featured the eight best teams of the Lietuvos krepšinio lyga (LKL) basketball league in Lithuania, competing for the championship spot. This will be the LKL playoffs' 26th edition. Žalgiris achieved their 23rd title overall, eleven consecutive.

The quarter-finals will be played in a best-of-three format, with the higher seeded team playing the first and (if necessary) third game at home. The semi-finals and finals will be played in a best-of-five format, with the higher seed team playing games 1, 3 and 5 (if necessary) at home.

== Notable events ==
- On 1 May 2021, Neptūnas made it to the playoffs after winning against Lietkabelis.
- On 2 May 2021, Rytas secured the second place in the table and their place in the playoffs after winning the match against Šiauliai.
- On 6 May 2021, the schedule for the playoffs was announced. The quarter-final stage will begin on May 12, and the semi-final stage will begin on May 20. The small final series is scheduled for June 2, June 5 and June 8. The final series dates are June 3, June 6 and June 9.
- On 15 May 2021, Žalgiris and Juventus became the first teams to reach the Betsafe-LKL semi-finals and formed the first pair of semi-finals. Žalgiris won the series 2-0 against Pieno žvaigždės. Juventus grabbed a difficult victory against Cbet Prienai and won the series with the result 2-0. The first match between these teams will take place on 20 May.
- On 16 May 2021, Lietkabelis became the third semi-final team and won the series 2-0 against Neptūnas. That means Neptūnas season is over.
- On 22 May 2021, Rytas became fourth semi-final team and won the series 2–0 against Šiauliai. Šiauliai season is over.
- On 29 May 2021, Žalgiris became first finalist and won the series 3-0 against Juventus. Juventus will play for 3rd place.
- On 7 June 2021, the last match of the Betsafe-LKL final series took place. Žalgiris won the Betsafe-LKL title, it is already the 23rd Žalgiris title and the 11th consecutive title.

== Qualified teams ==
Pos	Team	Pld	W	L	PF	PA	PD
1	Žalgiris	36	33	3	3277	2569	+708
2	Rytas	36	27	9	3185	2858	+327
3	Lietkabelis	36	23	13	3052	2883	+169
4	Juventus	36	23	13	3202	3102	+100
5	Cbet Prienai	36	14	22	3020	3210	−190
6	Neptūnas	36	14	22	2841	3061	−220
7	Šiauliai	36	13	23	3066	3290	−224
8	Pieno žvaigždės	36	12	24	2864	3043	−179

Source: LKL.LT

== Bracket ==
Quarter-finals
1	Žalgiris	2
8	Pieno žvaigždės	0
4	Juventus	2
5	Cbet Prienai	0
2	Rytas	2
7	Šiauliai	0
3	Lietkabelis	2
6	Neptūnas	0

Semi-finals
1	Žalgiris	3
4	Juventus	0
2	Rytas	3
3	Lietkabelis	0

Final
1	Žalgiris	3
2	Rytas	0
Third place
3	Lietkabelis	3
4	Juventus	2

== Quarter-finals ==
Team 1	Series	Team 2	Game 1	Game 2	Game 3
Žalgiris	2–0	Pieno žvaigždės	81–74	100–81	—
Juventus	2–0	Cbet Prienai	86–72	87–80	—
Rytas	2–0	Šiauliai	98–60	101–70	—
Lietkabelis	2–0	Neptūnas	94–93	94–78	—

=== Quarter-finals Game 1 ===
12 May 2021	Juventus	86–72 (Series: 1–0)	Cbet Prienai	Utena
18:00 (EEST)	Scoring by quarter: 29–19, 19–16, 20–25, 18–12
	Pts: Crawford 19; Rebs: Skučas 11; Asts: Crawford 5 PIR: Crawford 24	Boxscore	Pts: Sargiūnas 27; Rebs: Pacevičius 6 Asts: Lecomte 6 PIR: Sargiūnas 19	Arena: Utena Arena; Attendance: 106; Referees: Artūras Šukys, Vilius Mačiulaitis, Aurimas Borusas

12 May 2021	Žalgiris	81–74 (Series: 1–0)	Pieno žvaigždės	Kaunas
18:50 (EEST)	Scoring by quarter: 28–20, 24–16, 21–19, 8–19
	Pts: Grigonis 16; Rebs: Lauvergne 8 Asts: Walkup 7 PIR: Lauvergne 21	Boxscore	Pts: Giedraitis 19; Rebs: Želionis 8 Asts: Petrilevičius 5 PIR: Želionis 21	Arena: Žalgiris Arena; Attendance: 150; Referees: Gytis Vilius, Andrius Maleckas, Mindaugas Večerskis

13 May 2021	Lietkabelis	94–93 (Series: 1–0)	Neptūnas	Panevėžys
18:00 (EEST)	Scoring by quarter: 21–29, 24–24, 18–19, 31–21
	Pts: Kalaitzakis 19; Rebs: Masiulis, Gagić 5 Asts: Normantas 5 PIR: Kalaitzakis 23	Boxscore	Pts: Mažeika, Gailius 17; Rebs: Gailius 5 Asts: Janavičius 11; PIR: Janavičius 28	Arena: Cido Arena; Attendance: 150; Referees: Jurgis Laurinavičius, Gvidas Gedvilas, Gintaras Mačiulis

20 May 2021	Rytas	98–60 (Series: 1–0)	Šiauliai	Vilnius
19:00 (EEST)	Scoring by quarter: 26–18, 30–12, 21–17, 21–13
	Pts: Goudelock, Kitsing 15; Rebs: Echodas 7 Asts: Bičkauskis 4 PIR: Echodas 17	Boxscore	Pts: Urbutis 15; Rebs: Van Vliet 11; Asts: Van Vliet 5 PIR: Van Vliet 21	Arena: Jeep Arena; Attendance: 150; Referees: Tomas Jasevičius, Andrius Maleckas, Mindaugas Večerskis

=== Quarter-finals Game 2 ===
15 May 2021	Pieno žvaigždės	81–100 (Series: 0–2)	Žalgiris	Pasvalys
16:30 (EEST)	Scoring by quarter: 24–30, 25–17, 13–27, 19–26
	Pts: Manigat 23; Rebs: Petrilevičius 6 Asts: Franke 7 PIR: Šikšnius 20	Boxscore	Pts: Hayes 23; Rebs: Lauvergne 9 Asts: Walkup 6 PIR: Lauvergne 23	Arena: Pieno žvaigždės Arena; Referees: Tomas Jasevičius, Vilius Mačiulaitis, Andžej Urbanovič

15 May 2021	Cbet Prienai	80–87 (Series: 0–2)	Juventus	Prienai
17:20 (EEST)	Scoring by quarter: 23–21, 20–22, 20–27, 17–17
	Pts: Sušinskas 17; Rebs: Tubutis 10; Asts: Sušinskas 5 PIR: Sušinskas 23	Boxscore	Pts: Šulskis 22; Rebs: Skučas 13; Asts: Crawford, Skučas 4 PIR: Skučas 20	Arena: Prienai Arena; Attendance: 130; Referees: Jurgis Laurinavičius, Gintaras Vitkauskas, Gintaras Mačiulis

16 May 2021	Neptūnas	78–94 (Series: 0–2)	Lietkabelis	Klaipėda
17:20 (EEST)	Scoring by quarter: 26–24, 20–21, 10–24, 22–25
	Pts: Gailius 25; Rebs: Galdikas 6 Asts: Janavičius 10; PIR: Gailius 29	Boxscore	Pts: P. Valinskas 20; Rebs: Lipkevičius 11; Asts: P. Valinskas 5 PIR: Lipkevičius 30	Arena: Švyturys Arena; Attendance: 150; Referees: Gytis Vilius, Artūras Šukys, Juozas Barkauskas

22 May 2021	Šiauliai	70–101 (Series: 0–2)	Rytas	Šiauliai
17:20 (EEST)	Scoring by quarter: 20–19, 12–37, 13–30, 25–15
	Pts: Varnas 17; Rebs: three players 5 Asts: Furmanavičius 5 PIR: Varnas 18	Boxscore	Pts: Girdžiūnas, Butkevičius 16; Rebs: Radzevičius, Butkevičius 6 Asts: Bičkauskis 5 PIR: Butkevičius 24	Arena: Šiauliai Arena; Attendance: 150; Referees: Gintaras Vitkauskas, Juozas Barkauskas, Aurimas Borusas

== Semi-finals ==
Team 1	Series	Team 2	Game 1	Game 2	Game 3	Game 4	Game 5
Žalgiris	3–0	Juventus	100–75	116–80	93–75	—	—
Rytas	3–0	Lietkabelis	97–72	94–74	87–80	—	—

=== Semi-finals Game 1 ===
24 May 2021	Žalgiris	100–75 (Series: 1–0)	Juventus	Kaunas
18:50 (EEST)	Scoring by quarter: 23–23, 35–16, 17–16, 25–20
	Pts: Lauvergne, Walkup 17; Rebs: Jankūnas 8 Asts: Grigonis 6 PIR: Lauvergne 26	Boxscore	Pts: Kupšas 18; Rebs: Kupšas 5 Asts: Šulskis 6 PIR: Kupšas 20	Arena: Žalgiris Arena; Attendance: 164; Referees: Tomas Jasevičius, Gytis Vilius, Vilius Mačiulaitis

25 May 2021	Rytas	97–72 (Series: 1–0)	Lietkabelis	Vilnius
18:50 (EEST)	Scoring by quarter: 24–16, 32–23, 21–14, 20–19
	Pts: Echodas, Girdžiūnas 14; Rebs: Radzevičius 7 Asts: Butkevičius 6 PIR: Echodas 22	Boxscore	Pts: Gagić 17; Rebs: Kalaitzakis, Maldūnas 7 Asts: Normantas 4 PIR: Gagić 17	Arena: Jeep Arena; Attendance: 453; Referees: Gytis Vilius, Gintaras Vitkauskas, Andrius Maleckas

=== Semi-finals Game 2 ===
26 May 2021	Juventus	80–116 (Series: 0–2)	Žalgiris	Utena
18:50 (EEST)	Scoring by quarter: 22–23, 16–25, 26–33, 16–35
	Pts: Kupšas 23; Rebs: Urbonas 7 Asts: Crawford 5 PIR: Kupšas 25	Boxscore	Pts: Jokubaitis 19; Rebs: three players 4 Asts: three players 5 PIR: Jokubaitis 25	Arena: Utena Arena; Attendance: 142; Referees: Jurgis Laurinavičius, Artūras Šukys, Gintaras Mačiulis

27 May 2021	Lietkabelis	74–94 (Series: 0–2)	Rytas	Panevėžys
18:50 (EEST)	Scoring by quarter: 22–27, 17–19, 19–29, 16–19
	Pts: Masiulis 16; Rebs: P. Valinskas 7 Asts: Normantas 7 PIR: Normantas 19	Boxscore	Pts: Goudelock 18; Rebs: Butkevičius 7 Asts: Butkevičius 7 PIR: Echodas 24	Arena: Cido Arena; Attendance: 178; Referees: Jurgis Laurinavičius, Tomas Jasevičius, Artūras Šukys

=== Semi-finals Game 3 ===
29 May 2021	Žalgiris	93–75 (Series: 3–0)	Juventus	Kaunas
17:20 (EEST)	Scoring by quarter: 30–22, 25–10, 24–21, 14–22
	Pts: Grigonis 18; Rebs: Geben 10; Asts: Walkup 5 PIR: Grigonis 25	Boxscore	Pts: Kupšas 23; Rebs: Kupšas, Šulskis 7 Asts: Crawford, Urbonas 5 PIR: Kupšas 30	Arena: Žalgiris Arena; Attendance: 185; Referees: Tomas Jasevičius, Vilius Mačiulaitis, Andžej Urbanovič

30 May 2021	Rytas	87–80 (Series: 3–0)	Lietkabelis	Vilnius
16:20 (EEST)	Scoring by quarter: 25–24, 20–20, 20–24, 22–12
	Pts: Echodas 19; Rebs: Buva, Echodas 7 Asts: Bičkauskis 6 PIR: Echodas 23	Boxscore	Pts: Vinales 21; Rebs: Kalaitzakis, Masiulis 6 Asts: Maldūnas, Vinales 2 PIR: Kalaitzakis 15	Arena: Jeep Arena; Attendance: 485; Referees: Jurgis Laurinavičius, Gvidas Gedvilas, Juozas Barkauskas

== Third place ==
Team 1	Series	Team 2	Game 1	Game 2	Game 3	Game 4	Game 5
Lietkabelis	3–2	Juventus	87–74	74–85	112–82	79–83	84–63

=== Third-place game 1 ===
1 Jun 2021	Lietkabelis	87–74 (Series: 1–0)	Juventus	Panevėžys
18:50 (EEST)	Scoring by quarter: 14–21, 25–14, 23–25, 25–14
	Pts: Gagić 24; Rebs: Masiulis 12; Asts: Normantas 5 PIR: Gagić 27	Boxscore	Pts: Crawford 22; Rebs: 3 players 4 Asts: Crawford 5 PIR: Crawford 23	Arena: Cido Arena; Attendance: 97; Referees: Gytis Vilius, Gintaras Vitkauskas, Gvidas Gedvilas

=== Third-place game 2 ===
4 Jun 2021	Juventus	85–74 (Series: 1–1)	Lietkabelis	Utena
18:50 (EEST)	Scoring by quarter: 23–21, 21–13, 17–18, 24–22
	Pts: Crawford 20; Rebs: Šulskis, Urbonas 6 Asts: Crawford 7 PIR: Crawford 24	Boxscore	Pts: Gagić 19; Rebs: Lipkevičius 8 Asts: Normantas, P. Valinskas 4 PIR: Gagić 23	Arena: Utena Arena; Attendance: 146; Referees: Jurgis Laurinavičius, Artūras Šukys, Vilius Mačiulaitis

=== Third-place game 3 ===
6 Jun 2021	Lietkabelis	112–82 (Series: 2–1)	Juventus	Panevėžys
17:20 (EEST)	Scoring by quarter: 22–15, 37–19, 28–24, 25–24
	Pts: Lipkevičius, P. Valinskas 16; Rebs: Kalaitzakis 6 Asts: Normantas 9 PIR: Lipkevičius 19	Boxscore	Pts: Kupšas 16; Rebs: Kupšas 6 Asts: Urbonas 9 PIR: Kupšas 26	Arena: Cido Arena; Attendance: 203; Referees: Tomas Jasevičius, Jurgis Laurinavičius, Andrius Maleckas

=== Third-place game 4 ===
9 Jun 2021	Juventus	83–79 (Series: 2–2)	Lietkabelis	Utena
18:50 (EEST)	Scoring by quarter: 34–15, 16–28, 11–19, 22–17
	Pts: Gecevičius, Šulskis 17; Rebs: Gecevičius 6 Asts: Crawford, Šulskis 4 PIR: Šulskis 22	Boxscore	Pts: Gagić 16; Rebs: Kalaitzakis 12; Asts: Normantas 4 PIR: Kalaitzakis 21	Arena: Utena Arena; Attendance: 224; Referees: Tomas Jasevičius, Artūras Šukys, Gvidas Gedvilas

=== Third-place game 5 ===
11 Jun 2021	Lietkabelis	84–63 (Series: 3–2)	Juventus	Panevėžys
18:50 (EEST)	Scoring by quarter: 22–17, 20–13, 18–14, 24–19
	Pts: Normantas, P. Valinskas 19; Rebs: Gagić 11; Asts: P. Valinskas 5 PIR: Lipkevičius, Masiulis 19	Boxscore	Pts: Kupšas 14; Rebs: Kupšas 9 Asts: Paliukėnas 4 PIR: Kupšas 20	Arena: Cido Arena; Attendance: 250; Referees: Gytis Vilius, Jurgis Laurinavičius, Vilius Mačiulaitis

== Final ==
Team 1	Series	Team 2	Game 1	Game 2	Game 3	Game 4	Game 5
Žalgiris	3–0	Rytas	90–75	92–70	84–73	—	—

=== Final Game 1 ===
2 Jun 2021	Žalgiris	90–75 (Series: 1–0)	Rytas	Kaunas
18:50 (EEST)	Scoring by quarter: 23–23, 28–12, 20–24, 19–16
	Pts: Lauvergne 18; Rebs: Lauvergne 10; Asts: Walkup 7 PIR: Lauvergne 27	Boxscore	Pts: Buva 22; Rebs: Echodas 6 Asts: Bičkauskis 5 PIR: Buva 25	Arena: Žalgiris Arena; Attendance: 1044; Referees: Tomas Jasevičius, Jurgis Laurinavičius, Andrius Maleckas

=== Final Game 2 ===
5 Jun 2021	Rytas	70–92 (Series: 0–2)	Žalgiris	Vilnius
17:20 (EEST)	Scoring by quarter: 16–25, 23–21, 15–21, 16–25
	Pts: Goudelock 17; Rebs: Butkevičius, Echodas 6 Asts: Girdžiūnas 4 PIR: Radzevičius 17	Boxscore	Pts: Hayes 15; Rebs: Jankūnas 5 Asts: Walkup 6 PIR: Walkup 20	Arena: Jeep Arena; Attendance: 1351; Referees: Gytis Vilius, Tomas Jasevičius, Artūras Šukys

=== Final Game 3 ===
7 Jun 2021	Žalgiris	84–73 (Series: 3–0)	Rytas	Kaunas
18:50 (EEST)	Scoring by quarter: 16–15, 25–23, 23–15, 20–20
	Pts: Walkup 20; Rebs: Lauvergne 7 Asts: Grigonis 6 PIR: Walkup 25	Boxscore	Pts: Goudelock 25; Rebs: Buva 9 Asts: Goudelock 3 PIR: Buva 25	Arena: Žalgiris Arena; Attendance: 1809; Referees: Gytis Vilius, Gintaras Vitkauskas, Gvidas Gedvilas

== See also ==
- 2019–20 LKL season
