= 2018 King Mindaugas Cup =

2018 Karaliaus Mindaugo taurė

Tournament details
- Arena: Švyturys Arena; Klaipėda, Lithuania
- Dates: 13–18 February 2018

Final positions
- Champions: Žalgiris (2nd title)
- Runners-up: Lietuvos rytas
- Third place: Lietkabelis

Awards and statistics
- MVP: Edgaras Ulanovas

The 2018 Karaliaus Mindaugo taurė, also known as SIL – Karaliaus Mindaugo taurė for sponsorship purposes, was the third edition of the Lithuanian King Mindaugas Cup. On 7 December 2017 it was announced that Klaipėda would host the tournament.

Žalgiris was the defending champions. Žalgiris successfully defended its title after beating BC Lietuvos rytas in the Final.

== Format changes ==
After a lot of criticism during last year's tournament Lithuanian Basketball League changed distribution of quarterfinals games venues, awarding them directly to seeded teams instead of previously held open draw. LKL Cheerleaders Battles final was added to complement the event alongside traditional Three-point and Slam Dunk contests.

== Draw ==
The draw of the 2018 Karaliaus Mindaugo taurė will be held on 16 January 2018.

== Qualified teams ==
Eight highest ranked teams after the first half of the 2017–18 LKL regular season will qualify to the tournament.

Pos	Team	Pld	W	L	PF	PA	PD	Qualification
1	Žalgiris	18	16	2	1233	982	+251	Seeded
2	Neptūnas	18	15	3	1283	1157	+126	Seeded
3	Lietuvos rytas	18	14	4	1263	1136	+127	Seeded
4	Lietkabelis	18	12	6	1229	1159	+70	Seeded
5	Juventus	18	7	11	1189	1225	−36	Non-seeded
6	Šiauliai	18	6	12	1115	1252	−137	Non-seeded
7	Pieno žvaigždės	18	6	12	1187	1286	−99	Non-seeded
8	Dzūkija	18	6	12	1109	1273	−164	Non-seeded

Source: LKL

== Bracket ==
Quarter-finals; 13–14 February
Neptūnas	77
Dzūkija	85
Lietuvos rytas	91
Juventus	88
Lietkabelis	86
Pieno žvaigždės	76
Žalgiris	85
Šiauliai	78

Semi-finals; 17 February
Dzūkija	61
Lietuvos rytas	81
Lietkabelis	74
Žalgiris	88

Final; 18 February
Lietuvos rytas	62
Žalgiris	81

== Quarter-finals ==
=== Neptūnas Klaipėda vs. Dzūkija Alytus ===
13 February 2018	Neptūnas Klaipėda	77–85	Dzūkija Alytus	Klaipėda
18:00	Scoring by quarter: 17–19, 15–20, 25 −20, 20–26
	Pts: Šulskis, Želionis 13; Rebs: Želionis 12; Asts: Fields 5 PIR: Želionis 22	Boxscore	Pts: Stylianou 19; Rebs: Petty 11; Asts: Petty 6 PIR: Petty 37	Arena: Švyturio Arena; Attendance: 2,300; Referees: Gytis Vilius, Andžej Urbanovič, Ignas Davainis

Starters:			Pts	Reb	Ast
PG	0	(United States) Brandon Fields	5	3	5
SG	10	(Lithuania) Renaldas Seibutis	8	1	1
SF	88	(Lithuania) Vytautas Šulskis	13	4	1
PF	11	(Lithuania) Edgaras Želionis	13	12	2
C	21	(Lithuania) Simas Galdikas	12	5	2
Reserves:					
G	5	(United States) Jerry Johnson	5	1	4
F	7	(Lithuania) Laimonas Kisielius	9	1	4
G	9	(Lithuania) Tomas Delininkaitis	6	0	1
F	19	(Lithuania) Laimonas Chatkevičius	0	1	0
F	23	(Lithuania) Mindaugas Kačinas	4	0	0
C	25	(Lithuania) Matas Jucikas	DNP		
G	30	(Lithuania) Laurynas Beliauskas	DNP		
Head coach:
(Lithuanian Basketball Federation) Kazys Maksvytis

Neptūnas Klaipėda	Dzūkija Alytus

Starters:			Pts	Reb	Ast
PG	9	(United States) Parrish Petty	17	11	6
SG	32	(Lithuania) Gediminas Navickas	5	0	3
SF	19	(Cyprus) Nikolaos Stylianou	19	1	3
PF	14	(Lithuania) Paulius Petrilevičius	16	9	2
C	15	(Lithuania) Povilas Čukinas	2	0	2
Reserves:					
G	10	(United States) Charles Callison	DNP		
G	11	(Lithuania) Paulius Danisevičius	8	0	2
F	12	(Lithuania) Mindaugas Sušinskas	0	0	0
C	21	(Russia) Anatoly Kashirov	2	3	2
F	31	(United States) Alan Wiggins	10	0	0
F	77	(Lithuania) Gediminas Žalalis	6	2	0
Head coach:
(Estonian Basketball Association) Alar Varrak

=== Lietkabelis Panevėžys vs. Pieno žvaigždės Pasvalys ===
13 February 2018	Lietkabelis Panevėžys	86–76	Pieno žvaigždės Pasvalys	Panevėžys
20:10	Scoring by quarter: 19–28, 21–12, 19 −14, 27–22
	Pts: Jasaitis 20; Rebs: Skučas 9 Asts: Williams 6 PIR: Jasaitis, Williams 21	Boxscore	Pts: Bobrov 19; Rebs: Olisevičius 6 Asts: Bobrov, Hughes 4 PIR: Bobrov, Hughes 15	Arena: Cido arena Attendance: 2,812; Referees: Jurgis Laurinavičius, Vilius Mačiulaitis, Gintaras Mačiulis

Starters:			Pts	Reb	Ast
PG	3	(United States) Lorenzo Williams	14	4	6
SG	6	(Lithuania) Lukas Aukštikalnis	2	3	1
SF	13	(Lithuania) Simas Jasaitis	20	3	1
PF	50	(Lithuania) Žygimantas Skučas	5	9	3
C	14	(Lithuania) Vaidas Čepukaitis	9	2	2
Reserves:					
F	1	(Lithuania) Donatas Tarolis	DNP		
C	7	(Lithuania) Darjuš Lavrinovič	10	3	0
G	8	(Lithuania) Gintaras Leonavičius	6	5	0
G	11	(Lithuania) Arnas Velička	0	0	0
F	12	(Lithuania) Kšyštof Lavrinovič	11	2	2
G	30	(Croatia) Dominik Mavra	7	2	3
F	31	(Latvia) Žanis Peiners	2	0	2
Head coach:
(Lithuanian Basketball Federation) Ramūnas Butautas

Lietkabelis Panevėžys	Pieno žvaigždės Pasvalys

Starters:			Pts	Reb	Ast
PG	8	(United States) Trevon Hughes	11	3	4
SG	1	(Canada) Jahenns Manigat	6	5	3
SF	14	(Lithuania) Osvaldas Olisevičius	15	6	1
PF	13	(Ukraine) Vyacheslav Bobrov	16	3	4
C	18	(Kosovo) Lis Shoshi	10	1	1
Reserves:					
F	5	(Lithuania) Steponas Babrauskas	11	1	1
G	6	(Lithuania) Šarūnas Valunta	DNP		
G	7	(Lithuania) Tomas Galeckas	DNP		
F	9	(Lithuania) Ignas Fiodorovas	0	0	0
F	11	(United States) Tomas Lekūnas	4	2	1
C	21	(Russia) Nikita Balashov	1	0	1
G	23	(Lithuania) Martynas Varnas	2	5	3
Head coach:
(Lithuanian Basketball Federation) Gediminas Petrauskas

=== Žalgiris Kaunas vs. Šiauliai ===
14 February 2018	Žalgiris Kaunas	85–78	Šiauliai	Kaunas
18:00	Scoring by quarter: 17–21, 26–19, 26 −21, 16–17
	Pts: Micić 14; Rebs: Ulanovas 8 Asts: Pangos 10; PIR: Micić 22	Boxscore	Pts: Birutis 35; Rebs: Birutis 11; Asts: Sabeckis 7 PIR: Birutis 43	Arena: Žalgiris Arena; Attendance: 1,489; Referees: Artūras Šukys, Martynas Gudas, Aurimas Borusas

Starters:			Pts	Reb	Ast
PG	3	(Canada) Kevin Pangos	7	2	10
SG	66	(Lithuania) Paulius Valinskas	3	3	1
SF	92	(Lithuania) Edgaras Ulanovas	4	8	3
PF	13	(Lithuania) Paulius Jankūnas	9	3	2
C	0	(United States) Brandon Davies	8	4	1
Reserves:					
F	6	(France) Axel Toupane	9	4	1
C	19	(Lithuania) Martynas Sajus	0	0	0
F	20	(Lithuania) Gytis Masiulis	DNP		
G	21	(Lithuania) Artūras Milaknis	13	1	0
G	22	(Serbia) Vasilije Micić	14	0	7
F	30	(United States) Aaron White	10	4	0
C	44	(Lithuania) Antanas Kavaliauskas	8	4	3
Head coach:
(Lithuanian Basketball Federation) Šarūnas Jasikevičius

Žalgiris Kaunas	Šiauliai

Starters:			Pts	Reb	Ast
PG	8	(Lithuania) Donatas Sabeckis	2	6	7
SG	2	(United States) Nick Zeisloft	17	1	3
SF	0	(United States) Akeem Wright	2	3	5
PF	15	(Lithuania) Vytautas Šarakauskas	12	4	0
C	11	(Lithuania) Laurynas Birutis	35	11	2
Reserves:					
C	10	(Lithuania) Šarūnas Beniušis	2	2	1
G	19	(Lithuania) Mantvydas Žukauskas	0	0	0
G	25	(Lithuania) Evaldas Šaulys	2	1	1
G	30	(Lithuania) Kristupas Žemaitis	0	0	4
F	34	(Lithuania) Giedrius Stankevičius	DNP		
F	35	(Lithuania) Rytis Pipiras	6	3	3
Head coach:
(Lithuanian Basketball Federation) Antanas Sireika

=== Lietuvos rytas Vilnius vs. Juventus Utena ===
14 February 2018	Lietuvos rytas Vilnius	91–88(OT)	Juventus Utena	Vilnius
20:10	Scoring by quarter: 19–11, 18–21, 17 -25, 23–20, Overtime: 14–11
	Pts: Madgen 18; Rebs: Jomantas 7 Asts: Kramer 7 PIR: Echodas 23	Boxscore	Pts: Kupšas 22; Rebs: Bičkauskis 11; Asts: Ireland 9 PIR: Bičkauskis 28	Arena: Lietuvos rytas Arena; Attendance: 1,650; Referees: Andrius Maleckas, Gvidas Gedvilas, Juozas Barkauskas

Starters:			Pts	Reb	Ast
PG	3	(United States) Chris Kramer	15	3	7
SG	1	(Australia) Ben Madgen	18	1	1
SF	21	(Lithuania) Artūras Jomantas	8	7	2
PF	12	(Greece) Loukas Mavrokefalidis	13	5	5
C	14	(Lithuania) Martynas Echodas	12	6	4
Reserves:					
F	0	(Lithuania) Deividas Sirvydis	DNP		
F	8	(Lithuania) Mindaugas Lukauskis	DNP		
G	18	(Lithuania) Mindaugas Girdžiūnas	5	2	3
G	20	(United States) Jimmy Baron	5	1	2
F	31	(Lithuania) Rokas Giedraitis	13	6	0
C	55	(Lithuania) Egidijus Mockevičius	2	0	0
Head coach:
(Lithuanian Basketball Federation) Rimas Kurtinaitis

Lietuvos rytas Vilnius	Juventus Utena

Starters:			Pts	Reb	Ast
PG	2	(Lithuania) Dovis Bičkauskis	18	11	5
SG	24	(United States) Jonte Flowers	0	3	0
SF	6	(Lithuania) Arvydas Šikšnius	3	2	2
PF	12	(Ukraine) Maksym Korniyenko	0	1	0
C	49	(Lithuania) Mindaugas Kupšas	22	5	0
Reserves:					
G	0	(United States) Kenny Gaines	21	2	1
G	3	(United States) Anthony Ireland	7	6	9
G	5	(Lithuania) Tautvydas Paliukėnas	DNP		
F	10	(Lithuania) Karolis Guščikas	9	6	4
G	13	(Lithuania) Simas Buterlevičius	0	0	0
C	23	(United States) LaRon Dendy	8	1	0
Head coach:
(Lithuanian Basketball Federation) Žydrūnas Urbonas

== Semi-finals ==
=== Dzūkija Alytus vs. Lietuvos rytas Vilnius ===
17 February 2018	Dzūkija Alytus	61–81	Lietuvos rytas Vilnius	Klaipėda
14:00	Scoring by quarter: 9–21, 17–14, 18 -25, 17–21
	Pts: Petty, Stylianou 13; Rebs: Petty 8 Asts: Petty 4 PIR: Petty 19	Boxscore	Pts: Mavrokefalidis 19; Rebs: Echodas 14; Asts: Madgen 7 PIR: Echodas, Mavrokefalidis 23	Arena: Švyturio Arena; Attendance: 3,000; Referees: Jurgis Laurinavičius, Artūras Šukys, Vilius Mačiulaitis

Starters:			Pts	Reb	Ast
PG	11	(Lithuania) Paulius Danisevičius	12	3	1
SG	9	(United States) Parrish Petty	13	8	4
SF	77	(Lithuania) Gediminas Žalalis	2	2	1
PF	14	(Lithuania) Paulius Petrilevičius	12	2	1
C	15	(Lithuania) Povilas Čukinas	4	2	0
Reserves:					
F	7	(Lithuania) Tomas Pačėsas	0	0	0
G	10	(United States) Charles Callison	0	2	1
F	12	(Lithuania) Mindaugas Sušinskas	0	1	0
F	19	(Cyprus) Nikolaos Stylianou	13	2	1
C	21	(Russia) Anatoly Kashirov	2	4	1
F	31	(United States) Alan Wiggins	3	5	1
G	32	(Lithuania) Gediminas Navickas	0	1	2
Head coach:
(Estonian Basketball Association) Alar Varrak

Dzūkija Alytus	Lietuvos rytas Vilnius

Starters:			Pts	Reb	Ast
PG	3	(United States) Chris Kramer	4	2	2
SG	1	(Australia) Ben Madgen	11	5	7
SF	8	(Lithuania) Mindaugas Lukauskis	9	2	0
PF	12	(Greece) Loukas Mavrokefalidis	19	5	3
C	14	(Lithuania) Martynas Echodas	15	14	0
Reserves:					
F	0	(Lithuania) Deividas Sirvydis	0	0	0
G	18	(Lithuania) Mindaugas Girdžiūnas	14	1	1
G	20	(United States) Jimmy Baron	0	0	1
F	21	(Lithuania) Artūras Jomantas	0	1	1
F	31	(Lithuania) Rokas Giedraitis	7	0	3
C	55	(Lithuania) Egidijus Mockevičius	2	3	0
Head coach:
(Lithuanian Basketball Federation) Rimas Kurtinaitis

=== Žalgiris Kaunas vs. Lietkabelis Panevėžys ===
17 February 2018	Žalgiris Kaunas	88–74	Lietkabelis Panevėžys	Klaipėda
16:30	Scoring by quarter: 25–17, 29–17, 18 -24, 16–16
	Pts: Davies 17; Rebs: Davies, Kavaliauskas 7 Asts: Pangos 3 PIR: Davies 22	Boxscore	Pts: D.Lavrinovič 18; Rebs: D.Lavrinovič 3 Asts: Mavra, Peiners 4 PIR: D.Lavrinovič 14	Arena: Švyturio Arena; Attendance: 3,500; Referees: Tomas Jasevičius, Gytis Vilius, Gintaras Vitkauskas

Starters:			Pts	Reb	Ast
PG	3	(Canada) Kevin Pangos	13	2	3
SG	92	(Lithuania) Edgaras Ulanovas	9	2	0
SF	6	(France) Axel Toupane	6	1	1
PF	13	(Lithuania) Paulius Jankūnas	4	3	1
C	0	(United States) Brandon Davies	17	7	1
Reserves:					
C	19	(Lithuania) Martynas Sajus	0	0	0
F	20	(Lithuania) Gytis Masiulis	2	0	2
G	21	(Lithuania) Artūras Milaknis	5	2	0
G	22	(Serbia) Vasilije Micić	7	2	2
F	30	(United States) Aaron White	7	5	0
C	44	(Lithuania) Antanas Kavaliauskas	4	7	1
G	66	(Lithuania) Paulius Valinskas	14	1	2
Head coach:
(Lithuanian Basketball Federation) Šarūnas Jasikevičius

Žalgiris Kaunas	Lietkabelis Panevėžys

Starters:			Pts	Reb	Ast
PG	3	(United States) Lorenzo Williams	8	1	3
SG	11	(Lithuania) Arnas Velička	5	3	1
SF	31	(Latvia) Žanis Peiners	6	0	4
PF	50	(Lithuania) Žygimantas Skučas	5	1	0
C	14	(Lithuania) Vaidas Čepukaitis	4	1	1
Reserves:					
F	1	(Lithuania) Donatas Tarolis	10	3	0
G	6	(Lithuania) Lukas Aukštikalnis	3	0	3
C	7	(Lithuania) Darjuš Lavrinovič	18	3	1
G	8	(Lithuania) Gintaras Leonavičius	0	0	2
F	12	(Lithuania) Kšyštof Lavrinovič	5	1	1
SF	13	(Lithuania) Simas Jasaitis	2	1	0
G	30	(Croatia) Dominik Mavra	8	3	4
Head coach:
(Lithuanian Basketball Federation) Ramūnas Butautas

== Slam Dunk Contest ==
Contestants
Pos.	Player	Team	Height	Weight	First round	Final round
G	Kenneth Gaines	Juventus	1.91	94	94(45+49)	144(48+47+49)
G	Domantas Vilys^{WC}	Perlas (NKL)	1.88	74	89(44+45)	137(48+43+46)
C	Matas Jucikas	Neptūnas	2.05	91	82(43+39)	—
F	Vyacheslav Bobrov	Pieno žvaigždės	2.01	102	81(38+43)	—
F/C	LaRon Dendy	Juventus	2.06	104	80(43+37)	—
C	Šarūnas Beniušis^{INJ}	Šiauliai	2.06	98	–	—

^WC Selected as wild card participant.
^INJ Šarūnas Beniušis was unable to participate due to an illness

== Three-Point Contest ==
Contestants
Pos.	Player	Team	Height (m)	Weight (kg)	First round	Second round	Final round
G/F	Mindaugas Lukauskis	Lietuvos rytas	1.98	90	17	22	22
G	Nick Zeisloft	Šiauliai	1.93	94	21	23	19
G	Lukas Aukštikalnis^{REP}	Lietkabelis	1.96	80	17	20	—
F	Valery Likhodey	Nevėžis	2.04	100	17	16	—
G	Laurynas Beliauskas	Neptūnas	1.92	78	16	–	—
G	Anthony Ireland^{WC} ^{REP}	Juventus	1.76	79	16	–	—
G	Paulius Valinskas	Žalgiris	1.91	83	14	–	—
F	Dovis Bičkauskis^{REP}	Juventus	1.91	88	13	–	—
G	Gediminas Navickas	Dzūkija	1.80	71	12	–	—
G/F	Steponas Babrauskas	Pieno žvaigždės	1.97	88	11	—	—
G	Edvinas Šeškus	Vytautas	1.96	80	8	–	—
G	LaMelo Ball^{WC}	Vytautas	1.91	75	–	–	—

^WC Selected as wild card participants.
^REP Lukas Aukštikalnis was selected as Adas Juškevičius replacement.
^REP Dovis Bičkauskis was selected as Simas Buterlevičius replacement
^REP Anthony Ireland was selected as Jerry Johnson replacement.

== Final ==
18 February 2018	Žalgiris Kaunas	81–62	Lietuvos rytas Vilnius	Klaipėda
17:30	Scoring by quarter: 20–19, 13–16, 27–18, 21–9
	Pts: Ulanovas 13; Rebs: Ulanovas 4 Asts: Pangos 4 PIR: Ulanovas 28	Boxscore	Pts: Kramer 20; Rebs: Echodas 8 Asts: Baron 4 PIR: Madgen	Arena: Švyturio Arena; Attendance: 5,200; Referees: Tomas Jasevičius, Jurgis Laurinavičius, Gytis Vilius

Starters:			Pts	Reb	Ast
PG	3	(Canada) Kevin Pangos	11	2	7
SG	92	(Lithuania) Edgaras Ulanovas	21	8	0
SF	6	(France) Axel Toupane	9	5	2
PF	13	(Lithuania) Paulius Jankūnas	1	6	4
C	0	(United States) Brandon Davies	7	3	0
Reserves:					
C	19	(Lithuania) Martynas Sajus	0	0	0
F	20	(Lithuania) Gytis Masiulis	0	0	0
G	21	(Lithuania) Artūras Milaknis	3	1	1
G	22	(Serbia) Vasilije Micić	3	3	3
F	30	(United States) Aaron White	14	5	1
C	44	(Lithuania) Antanas Kavaliauskas	10	0	1
G	66	(Lithuania) Paulius Valinskas	2	1	0
Head coach:
(Lithuanian Basketball Federation) Šarūnas Jasikevičius

Žalgiris Kaunas	Lietuvos rytas Vilnius

Karaliaus Mindaugo taurė MVP
(Lithuania) Edgaras Ulanovas
Game rules
Game was played under FIBA rules.

2018 Karaliaus Mindaugo taurė Winners
Žalgiris Kaunas
2nd title

Starters:			Pts	Reb	Ast
PG	3	(United States) Chris Kramer	16	3	3
SG	1	(Australia) Ben Madgen	8	4	0
SF	8	(Lithuania) Mindaugas Lukauskis	1	0	0
PF	12	(Greece) Loukas Mavrokefalidis	8	4	2
C	14	(Lithuania) Martynas Echodas	7	6	1
Reserves:					
F	0	(Lithuania) Deividas Sirvydis	0	0	0
G	18	(Lithuania) Mindaugas Girdžiūnas	3	0	0
G	20	(United States) Jimmy Baron	7	3	4
F	21	(Lithuania) Artūras Jomantas	0	4	1
F	31	(Lithuania) Rokas Giedraitis	7	2	1
F	42	(United States) Travis Peterson	0	0	0
C	55	(Lithuania) Egidijus Mockevičius	5	1	0
Head coach:
(Lithuanian Basketball Federation) Rimas Kurtinaitis

== All-Tournament Team ==
- PG – (Croatia) Dominik Mavra
- SG – (Australia) Ben Madgen
- SF – (Lithuania) Edgaras Ulanovas (MVP)
- PF – (United States) Aaron White
- C – (Lithuania) Martynas Echodas
