= 2025–26 BC Rytas season =

BC Rytas
2025–26 season
- Manager: (Lithuanian Basketball Federation) Mantvydas Dabašinskas
- Head coach: (Lithuanian Basketball Federation) Giedrius Žibėnas
- Arena: Active Vilnius Arena; Arena Vilnius
- LKL: Quarterfinals
- Basketball Champions League: Winners
- King Mindaugas Cup: Runners-up
- Highest home attendance: LKL: 9,186; Rytas 81–90 Žalgiris (27 December 2025) Basketball Champions League: 8,037; Rytas 77–70 Nymburk (1 April 2026)
- Lowest home attendance: LKL: 1,285; Rytas 98–81 Jonava Hipocredit (22 April 2026) Basketball Champions League: 4,011; Rytas 116–90 MLP Academics Heidelberg (5 November 2025)
- Average home attendance: LKL: 2,787; Basketball Champions League: 5,250
- Biggest win: Jonava Hipocredit 71–105 Rytas (22 November 2025)
- Biggest defeat: Lietkabelis 96–71 Rytas (3 May 2026)
Home	Away

The 2025–26 season is Rytas's 53rd (9th as Rytas) in the existence of the club.

Times up to 25 October 2025 and from 29 March 2026 are EEST (UTC+3). Times from 25 October 2025 and from 29 March 2026 are EET (UTC+2).

The year for Rytas is considered one of the most divisive in club history, as Rytas won the Basketball Champions League, but suffered a complete fiasco in the Lithuanian Basketball League.

== Players ==
=== Current roster ===
Note: Flags indicate national team eligibility at FIBA-sanctioned events. Players may hold other non-FIBA nationalities not displayed.

BC Rytas roster
Players
Coaches

Pos.	No.	Nat.	Name	Ht.	Wt.	Age
PG	3	(Lithuania)	Marčiulionis, Augustas	1.93 m (6 ft 4 in)	91 kg (201 lb)	24 – 21 March 2002
C	8	(Lithuania)	Gudaitis, Artūras (C)	2.08 m (6 ft 10 in)	115 kg (254 lb)	33 – 19 June 1993
F	9	(Germany)	Bruhnke, Kay	2.06 m (6 ft 9 in)	93 kg (205 lb)	25 – 15 July 2001
G	10	(United States)	Harding, Jerrick	1.85 m (6 ft 1 in)	82 kg (181 lb)	28 – 13 April 1998
C	14	(Lithuania)	Echodas, Martynas	2.06 m (6 ft 9 in)	110 kg (243 lb)	29 – 7 July 1997
G/F	16	(Lithuania)	Urbonas, Ignas	1.99 m (6 ft 6 in)	93 kg (205 lb)	18 – 22 November 2007
G	19	(Lithuania)	Stuknys, Nikas	2.02 m (6 ft 8 in)	93 kg (205 lb)	21 – 30 June 2005
F/C	21	(Lithuania)	Masiulis, Gytis	2.07 m (6 ft 9 in)	99 kg (218 lb)	28 – 10 April 1998
G/F	22	(Lithuania)	Križanauskas, Gantas	1.94 m (6 ft 4 in)	91 kg (201 lb)	20 – 22 March 2006
F	24	(United States)	Caroline, Jordan	2.01 m (6 ft 7 in)	107 kg (236 lb)	30 – 15 January 1996
F/C	31	(Lithuania)	Kasparas, Danielius	2.03 m (6 ft 8 in)	110 kg (243 lb)	22 – 26 February 2004
F	41	(Lithuania)	Lukošius, Simonas	2.02 m (6 ft 8 in)	102 kg (225 lb)	24 – 13 August 2002
G/F	43	(Lithuania)	Sargiūnas, Ignas	1.96 m (6 ft 5 in)	86 kg (190 lb)	26 – 11 September 1999
PG	44	(United States)	Smith, Speedy	1.91 m (6 ft 3 in)	82 kg (181 lb)	33 – 28 January 1993
G/F	77	(Lithuania)	Paliukėnas, Martynas	1.95 m (6 ft 5 in)	94 kg (207 lb)	32 – 14 September 1993

Head coach

- (Lithuania) Giedrius Žibėnas

Assistant coach(es)

- (Finland) Vesa Vertio
- (Lithuania) Nedas Pacevičius
- (Lithuania) Gustas Maskoliūnas

Athletic trainer(s)

- (Lithuania) Tadas Jackūnas

Physiotherapist(s)

- (Lithuania) Andrius Misiūra
- (Lithuania) Konstantinas Medvedevas

Legend

- (C) Team captain
- Injured

- Roster

=== Depth chart ===
Pos.	Starting 5	Bench 1	Bench 2
C	Martynas Echodas	Gytis Masiulis	Artūras Gudaitis
PF	Kay Bruhnke	Jordan Caroline	Danielius Kasparas
SF	Simonas Lukošius	Martynas Paliukėnas	Ignas Urbonas
SG	Ignas Sargiūnas	Jerrick Harding	Gantas Križanauskas
PG	Speedy Smith	Augustas Marčiulionis	Nikas Stuknys

=== Squad changes for/during the 2025–26 season ===
==== In ====
No.	Pos.	Nat.	Name	Moving from	
—	AC	(Lithuania)	Nedas Pacevičius	BC Wolves	(Lithuania)
—	AC	(Finland)	Vesa Vertio	Helsinki Seagulls	(Finland)
0	F/C	(United States) (North Macedonia)	Jacob Wiley	Coviran Granada	(Spain)
1	G	(United States)	Jordan Walker	Promitheas Patras	(Greece)
9	F	(Germany)	Kay Bruhnke	Türk Telekom	(Turkey)
10	G	(United States)	Jerrick Harding	MoraBanc Andorra	(Andorra)
14	C	(Lithuania)	Martynas Echodas	Alba Berlin	(Germany)
19	G	(Lithuania)	Nikas Stuknys	BC Rytas-2	(Lithuania)
24	F	(United States)	Jordan Caroline	Saint-Quentin Basket-Ball	(France)
31	F/C	(Lithuania)	Danielius Kasparas	BC Rytas-2	(Lithuania)
41	F	(Lithuania)	Simonas Lukošius	Cincinnati Bearcats	(United States)
44	PG	(United States)	Speedy Smith	Merkezefendi Basket	(Turkey)

==== Out ====
No.	Pos.	Nat.	Name	Moving to	
—	AC	(Greece)	Georgios Dedas	Filou Oostende	(Belgium)
0	F/C	(United States) (North Macedonia)	Jacob Wiley	Cangrejeros de Santurce	(Puerto Rico)
1	F	(United States)	Savion Flagg	Napoli Basket	(Italy)
1	G	(United States)	Jordan Walker	Maroussi B.C.	(Greece)
2	G/F	(Lithuania)	Margiris Normantas	Bilbao Basket	(Spain)
3	G	(United States)	Jayvon Graves	Legia Warsaw	(Poland)
6	PG	(United States)	Parker Jackson-Cartwright	New Zealand Breakers	(New Zealand)
7	G/F	(Lithuania)	Gytis Radzevičius	Saski Baskonia	(Spain)
10	F/C	(Lithuania)	Ąžuolas Tubelis	Žalgiris Kaunas	(Lithuania)
14	F/C	(Lithuania)	Oskaras Pleikys	Šiauliai	(Lithuania)
20	PG	(United States)	R. J. Cole	Umana Reyer Venezia	(Italy)
23	C	(Armenia)	Steven Enoch	Aris Thessaloniki	(Greece)

== Pre-season and friendlies ==
=== Friendly matches ===
26 August 2025	Jonava (Lithuanian Basketball Federation)	79–82	(Lithuanian Basketball Federation) Rytas	Druskininkai
14:12	Scoring by quarter: 18–24, 25–22, 15–14, 21–22
	Pts: Repšys, Williamson 16; Rebs: Repšys 8 Asts: Sidarevičius, Stankevičius 4	Report	Pts: Harding 23; Rebs: Masiulis 8 Asts: Stuknys 4	Attendance: 50; Referees: Darius Šomka, Aurimas Borusas

29 August 2025	Lietkabelis (Lithuanian Basketball Federation)	77–78	(Lithuanian Basketball Federation) Rytas	Druskininkai
12:12	Scoring by quarter: 16–16, 26–22, 22–14, 13–26
	Pts: Morris 16; Rebs: Maldūnas 9 Asts: Morris, Radžius 5	Report	Pts: Gudaitis 11; Rebs: Wiley 10; Asts: Urbonas, Stuknys 4	Attendance: 50

5 September 2025	Rytas (Lithuanian Basketball Federation)	109–98	(Lithuanian Basketball Federation) Juventus	Vilnius
16:56	Scoring by quarter: 25–18, 30–27, 34–29, 20–24
	Pts: Wiley 26; Rebs: Wiley 11; Asts: Stuknys 8 PIR: Wiley 42	Report	Pts: Daniels 24; Rebs: Daniels 10; Asts: Valunta 5 PIR: Daniels 29	Arena: Active Vilnius Arena; Attendance: 900; Referees: Andžej Urbanovič, Tomas Stankevičius

10 September 2025	Germani Brescia (Italian Basketball Federation)	93–75	(Lithuanian Basketball Federation) Rytas	Brescia
20:00	Scoring by quarter: 21–17, 29–25, 20–14, 23–19
	Pts: Valle 29; Rebs: Ndour 6 Asts: Ivanović 4 PIR: Valle 29	Report	Pts: Masiulis 16; Rebs: Wiley 11; Asts: Stuknys, Wiley 3 PIR: Wiley 23	Arena: PalaLeonessa

12 September 2025	Reyer Venezia (Italian Basketball Federation)	87–94	(Lithuanian Basketball Federation) Rytas	Venice
21:30	Scoring by quarter: 23–27, 22–23, 25–22, 17–22
	Pts: Tessitori 17; Rebs: Horton, Tessitori 7 Asts: Valentine 5 PIR: Tessitori 24	Report	Pts: Lukošius, Walker 19; Rebs: Wiley 11; Asts: Bruhnke, Paliukėnas 4 PIR: Gudaitis 21	Arena: Palasport Giuseppe Taliercio

16 September 2025	Rytas (Lithuanian Basketball Federation)	105–93	(Azerbaijan Basketball Federation) Sabah BC	Vilnius
17:11	Scoring by quarter: 29–25, 24–26, 21–25, 31–14
	Pts: Radzevičius 19; Rebs: Gudaitis 9 Asts: Paliukėnas 7	Report	Pts: Gravett 20; Rebs: Pansa, Tillman 9 Asts: Gravett 7	Arena: Twinsbet Arena; Attendance: 10; Referees: Andžej Urbanovič, Mantas Masalskis

== Competitions ==
=== Overview ===
Competition	First match	Last match	Starting round	Final position	Record							
Competition	First match	Last match	Starting round	Final position	Pld	W	D	L	PF	PA	PD	Win %
LKL	21 September 2025	23 May 2026	Regular season	Quarterfinals	34	20		14	3,149	2,923	+226	58.82
Basketball Champions League	7 October 2025	9 May 2026	Regular season	Winners	16	12		4	1,450	1,318	+132	75.00
King Mindaugas Cup	21 December 2025	22 February 2026	Quarterfinals	Runners-up	4	3		1	387	366	+21	75.00
Total					54	35	0	19	4,986	4,607	+379	64.81

Source: Competitions

=== LKL ===
==== League table ====
Pos	Team	Pld	W	L	PF	PA	PD	Qualification or relegation
1	Žalgiris	32	31	1	2920	2457	+463	Advance to playoffs
2	Rytas	32	20	12	2970	2730	+240	Advance to playoffs
3	Neptūnas	32	17 (Note: Neptūnas are ahead of Šiauliai on head-to-head points difference: Neptūnas +18; Šiauliai -18.)	15	2969	2889	+80	Advance to playoffs
4	Šiauliai	32	17	15	2729	2802	−73	Advance to playoffs
5	Lietkabelis	32	15 (Note: Lietkabelis are ahead of Gargždai on head-to-head points difference: Lietkabelis +16; Gargždai -16.)	17	2668	2586	+82	Advance to playoffs

Source: LKL.lt
Rules for classification: 1) Win–loss record; 2) Percentage of wins; 3) Head–to–head record; 4) Head–to–head percentage of wins; 5) Head–to–head point difference; 6) Head–to–head points scored; 7) Point difference; 8) Points scored; 9) Lottery draw (Note: Head–to–head record is used only after all the matches between the teams in question have been played)

==== Results summary ====
Overall						Home					Away				
Pld	W	L	PF	PA	PD	W	L	PF	PA	PD	W	L	PF	PA	PD
32	20	12	2970	2730	+240	12	4	1519	1316	+203	8	8	1451	1414	+37

Source: Competitive matches

==== Matches ====
21 September 2025 1	Nevėžis-Paskolų klubas	64–82	Rytas	Kėdainiai
19:10	Scoring by quarter: 21–23, 14–27, 16–17, 13–15
	Pts: Perkins 20; Rebs: Muila 5 Asts: Peterson 4 PIR: Perkins 22	Boxscore	Pts: Harding 24; Rebs: Gudaitis, Wiley 7 Asts: Sargiūnas 6 PIR: Harding 27	Arena: Kėdainiai Arena; Attendance: 1,438; Referees: Juozas Barkauskas, Andžej Urbanovič, Jonas Lazauskas

24 September 2025 2	Rytas	99–73	Gargždai	Vilnius
18:30	Scoring by quarter: 29–19, 31–16, 14–21, 25–17
	Pts: Wiley 19; Rebs: Gudaitis 10; Asts: Paliukėnas 4 PIR: Gudaitis 27	Boxscore	Pts: Pulliam 17; Rebs: Griciūnas 7 Asts: Hagins 3 PIR: Pulliam 13	Arena: Active Vilnius Arena; Attendance: 1,963; Referees: Andžej Urbanovič, Darius Šomka, Martynas Karaliūnas

28 September 2025 3	Juventus	85–92	Rytas	Utena
16:50	Scoring by quarter: 24–19, 27–29, 14–22, 20–22
	Pts: Daniels 20; Rebs: Uleckas 6 Asts: Daniels 7 PIR: Daniels 27	Boxscore	Pts: Harding 16; Rebs: Gudaitis 10; Asts: Sargiūnas 5 PIR: Gudaitis 23	Arena: Utena Arena; Attendance: 1,723; Referees: Saulius Račys, Gabrielius Simonavičius, Vidmantas Rušinas

11 October 2025 4	Lietkabelis	89–84	Rytas	Panevėžys
16:50	Scoring by quarter: 23–21, 22–20, 24–21, 20–22
	Pts: Morris 29; Rebs: Danusevičius, Mutic 8 Asts: Kullamäe 10; PIR: Mutic 22	Boxscore	Pts: Walker 17; Rebs: Three players 5 Asts: Paliukėnas 5 PIR: Gudaitis 27	Arena: Kalnapilio Arena; Attendance: 2,481; Referees: Gvidas Gedvilas, Juozas Barkauskas, Gintaras Mačiulis

18 October 2025 5	Rytas	97–93	Neptūnas	Vilnius
16:50	Scoring by quarter: 21–17, 33–27, 19–20, 24–29
	Pts: Sargiūnas 25; Rebs: Wiley 8 Asts: Bruhnke 6 PIR: Sargiūnas 29	Boxscore	Pts: Lomažs 25; Rebs: Pacevičius 6 Asts: Lomažs 6 PIR: Tarolis 29	Arena: Active Vilnius Arena; Attendance: 1,986; Referees: Gvidas Gedvilas, Aurimas Borusas, Vidmantas Rušinas

25 October 2025 6	Rytas	94–79	Šiauliai	Vilnius
19:10	Scoring by quarter: 32–24, 25–21, 21–21, 16–13
	Pts: Harding 19; Rebs: Gudaitis, Radzevičius 8 Asts: Sargiūnas 6 PIR: Radzevičius 24	Boxscore	Pts: Reddish 25; Rebs: Pleikys 8 Asts: McKnight 5 PIR: Reddish 20	Arena: Twinsbet Arena; Attendance: 2,357; Referees: Saulius Račys, Gintaras Mačiulis, Andžej Urbanovič

2 November 2025 7	Žalgiris	79–75	Rytas	Kaunas
16:50	Scoring by quarter: 15–21, 27–17, 22–14, 15–23
	Pts: Francisco 15; Rebs: Sleva 10; Asts: Francisco 5 PIR: Birutis 14	Boxscore	Pts: Harding 20; Rebs: Gudaitis, Radzevičius 7 Asts: Walker 6 PIR: Harding 22	Arena: Žalgiris Arena; Attendance: 13,538; Referees: Gytis Vilius, Saulius Račys, Gvidas Gedvilas

9 November 2025 8	Rytas	104–72	Jonava Hipocredit	Vilnius
16:50	Scoring by quarter: 28–21, 36–25, 20–16, 20–10
	Pts: Walker 27; Rebs: Gudaitis 10; Asts: Radzevičius, Walker 4 PIR: Gudaitis, Walker 30	Boxscore	Pts: Slavinskas 17; Rebs: Kirves 5 Asts: Repšys, Sidarevičius 4 PIR: Slavinskas 17	Arena: Twinsbet Arena; Attendance: 1,925; Referees: Gintaras Mačiulis, Dovydas Kairys, Ignas Jablonskas

15 November 2025 9	Šiauliai	100–105	Rytas	Šiauliai
19:10	Scoring by quarter: 22–19, 20–27, 27–31, 31–28
	Pts: Reddish 28; Rebs: Reddish 9 Asts: Valinskas 8 PIR: Reddish 27	Boxscore	Pts: Harding 21; Rebs: Gudaitis, Wiley 8 Asts: Harding 5 PIR: Masiulis 28	Arena: Šiauliai Arena; Attendance: 2,989; Referees: Gytis Vilius, Andžej Urbanovič, Ignas Kutka

22 November 2025 10	Jonava Hipocredit	71–105	Rytas	Jonava
16:50	Scoring by quarter: 14–29, 19–26, 19–29, 19–21
	Pts: Slavinskas 18; Rebs: Three players 4 Asts: Sidarevičius 5 PIR: Kreišmontas 18	Boxscore	Pts: Walker 20; Rebs: Masiulis 7 Asts: Paliukėnas, Walker 5 PIR: Gudaitis, Walker 24	Arena: Jonava Arena; Attendance: 1,313; Referees: Aurimas Borusas, Gabrielius Simonavičius, Eimantas Vasiliauskas

6 December 2025 11	Rytas	104–74	Nevėžis-Paskolų klubas	Vilnius
16:50	Scoring by quarter: 27–23, 20–15, 30–16, 27–20
	Pts: Walker 32; Rebs: Gudaitis, Masiulis 9 Asts: Walker 5 PIR: Walker 36	Boxscore	Pts: McLaughlin 19; Rebs: Chargois, Vaitkus 8 Asts: Ramanauskas 5 PIR: Chargois 15	Arena: Active Vilnius Arena; Attendance: 1,796; Referees: Artūras Šukys, Gabrielius Simonavičius, Deividas Mačiulskis

13 December 2025 12	Rytas	73–84	Lietkabelis	Vilnius
16:50	Scoring by quarter: 17–20, 17–18, 20–23, 19–23
	Pts: Gudaitis 21; Rebs: Gudaitis 12; Asts: Walker 6 PIR: Gudaitis 31	Boxscore	Pts: Aimaq 19; Rebs: Danusevičius 11; Asts: Aimaq 4 PIR: Aimaq 26	Arena: Active Vilnius Arena; Attendance: 2,006; Referees: Artūras Šukys, Gvidas Gedvilas, Juozas Barkauskas

27 December 2025 13	Rytas	81–90	Žalgiris	Vilnius
16:50	Scoring by quarter: 20–23, 18–27, 19–22, 24–18
	Pts: Harding 25; Rebs: Gudaitis 10; Asts: Sargiūnas, Wiley 4 PIR: Harding 25	Boxscore	Pts: Wright 15; Rebs: Tubelis 9 Asts: Francisco 9 PIR: Tubelis 18	Arena: Twinsbet Arena; Attendance: 9,186; Referees: Gytis Vilius, Gvidas Gedvilas, Saulius Račys

10 January 2026 14	Gargždai	82–78	Rytas	Gargždai
16:50	Scoring by quarter: 15–16, 21–15, 23–25, 23–22
	Pts: Turner 19; Rebs: Gailius, Petrilevičius 8 Asts: Pulliam 5 PIR: Three players 12	Boxscore	Pts: Harding 23; Rebs: Gudaitis 11; Asts: Walker 7 PIR: Harding 27	Arena: Gargždų Arena; Attendance: 1,203; Referees: Artūras Šukys, Andžej Urbanovič, Ignas Jablonskas

24 January 2026 15	Rytas	96–99	Juventus	Vilnius
19:10	Scoring by quarter: 23–25, 18–31, 30–21, 25–22
	Pts: Harding 28; Rebs: Caroline, Harding 6 Asts: Bruhnke, Walker 4 PIR: Harding 38	Boxscore	Pts: Uleckas 23; Rebs: Uleckas 8 Asts: Sabeckis 6 PIR: Uleckas 27	Arena: Twinsbet Arena; Attendance: 2,518; Referees: Juozas Barkauskas, Aurimas Borusas, Darius Šomka

31 January 2026 16	Neptūnas	95–87	Rytas	Klaipėda
16:50	Scoring by quarter: 30–19, 22–26, 23–22, 20–20
	Pts: Lomažs 27; Rebs: Three players 7 Asts: Velička 15; PIR: Velička 47	Boxscore	Pts: Harding 25; Rebs: Sargiūnas 7 Asts: Smith 6 PIR: Masiulis 31	Arena: Švyturys Arena; Attendance: 3,358; Referees: Artūras Šukys, Juozas Barkauskas, Gabrielius Simonavičius

7 February 2026 17	Jonava Hipocredit	84–101	Rytas	Jonava
16:50	Scoring by quarter: 25–20, 23–30, 23–25, 13–26
	Pts: Slavinskas 19; Rebs: Repšys 7 Asts: Sidarevičius 7 PIR: Slavinskas 21	Boxscore	Pts: Caroline 26; Rebs: Gudaitis 10; Asts: Smith 7 PIR: Masiulis 22	Arena: Jonava Arena; Attendance: 1,192; Referees: Juozas Barkauskas, Andžej Urbanovič, Ignas Kutka

14 February 2026 18	Rytas	100–95	Neptūnas	Vilnius
19:10	Scoring by quarter: 31–23, 25–22, 21–24, 23–26
	Pts: Harding 21; Rebs: Caroline, Gudaitis 6 Asts: Smith 6 PIR: Harding 24	Boxscore	Pts: Tarolis 20; Rebs: Šilinš 5 Asts: Velička 12; PIR: Velička 34	Arena: Active Vilnius Arena; Attendance: 1,928; Referees: Artūras Šukys, Gvidas Gedvilas, Dovydas Kairys

17 February 2026 19	Juventus	82–87	Rytas	Utena
18:45	Scoring by quarter: 26–21, 19–22, 12–22, 25–22
	Pts: Vraneš 17; Rebs: Vraneš 10; Asts: Three players 5 PIR: Vraneš 26	Boxscore	Pts: Sargiūnas, Smith 16; Rebs: Gudaitis 12; Asts: Smith, Urbonas 5 PIR: Masiulis 23	Arena: Utena Arena; Attendance: 1,878; Referees: Gytis Vilius, Juozas Barkauskas, Ignas Jablonskas

15 March 2026 20	Žalgiris	98–81	Rytas	Kaunas
16:50	Scoring by quarter: 35–9, 23–24, 25–24, 15–24
	Pts: Wright 16; Rebs: Birutis 7 Asts: Williams-Goss 7 PIR: Wright 24	Boxscore	Pts: Masiulis 20; Rebs: Marčiulionis 6 Asts: Marčiulionis, Smith 5 PIR: Masiulis 27	Arena: Žalgiris Arena; Attendance: 12,903; Referees: Artūras Šukys, Saulius Račys, Gvidas Gedvilas

22 March 2026 21	Rytas	96–81	Lietkabelis	Vilnius
16:50	Scoring by quarter: 23–28, 22–12, 22–23, 29–18
	Pts: Sargiūnas 43; Rebs: Lukošius 5 Asts: Sargiūnas 4 PIR: Sargiūnas 58	Boxscore	Pts: Kullamäe 23; Rebs: Danusevičius 9 Asts: Kullamäe 4 PIR: Kullamäe 19	Arena: Twinsbet Arena; Attendance: 2,918; Referees: Gytis Vilius, Juozas Barkauskas, Dovydas Kairys

29 March 2026 22	Rytas	98–77	Gargždai	Vilnius
16:50	Scoring by quarter: 20–29, 25–12, 24–22, 29–14
	Pts: Sargiūnas 22; Rebs: Gudaitis 9 Asts: Marčiulionis 7 PIR: Sargiūnas 28	Boxscore	Pts: Turner 22; Rebs: Petrilevičius 13; Asts: Turner, Vaištaras 3 PIR: Turner 23	Arena: Active Vilnius Arena; Attendance: 1,706; Referees: Artūras Šukys, Gabrielius Simonavičius, Tomas Stankevičius

4 April 2026 23	Rytas	105–91	Nevėžis-Paskolų klubas	Vilnius
19:10	Scoring by quarter: 25–27, 28–14, 25–22, 27–28
	Pts: Lukošius 25; Rebs: Echodas 9 Asts: Marčiulionis 10; PIR: Lukošius 30	Boxscore	Pts: Jefferson, Muila 17; Rebs: Muila 13; Asts: Jefferson, Ramanauskas 5 PIR: Muila 24	Arena: Active Vilnius Arena; Attendance: 1,512; Referees: Juozas Barkauskas, Dovydas Kairys, Ignas Kutka

12 April 2026 24	Šiauliai	107–90	Rytas	Šiauliai
16:50	Scoring by quarter: 31–27, 22–24, 23–18, 31–21
	Pts: Henderson Jr. 40; Rebs: Pleikys 7 Asts: Henderson Jr., Kariniauskas 4 PIR: Henderson Jr. 43	Boxscore	Pts: Marčiulionis 25; Rebs: Echodas, Smith 5 Asts: Smith 11; PIR: Smith 23	Arena: Šiauliai Arena; Attendance: 2,919; Referees: Gytis Vilius, Gintaras Mačiulis, Ignas Jablonskas

19 April 2026 25	Rytas	70–75	Žalgiris	Vilnius
16:50	Scoring by quarter: 21–15, 16–27, 25–19, 8–14
	Pts: Marčiulionis 13; Rebs: Sargiūnas 9 Asts: Sargiūnas 5 PIR: Echodas 17	Boxscore	Pts: Ulanovas 17; Rebs: Birutis 8 Asts: Lô 3 PIR: Birutis 21	Arena: Arena Vilnius; Attendance: 8,179; Referees: Gytis Vilius, Saulius Račys, Andžej Urbanovič

22 April 2026 26	Rytas	98–81	Jonava Hipocredit	Vilnius
18:30	Scoring by quarter: 29–13, 20–21, 25–24, 24–23
	Pts: Harding 23; Rebs: Bruhnke 7 Asts: Harding 8 PIR: Harding 31	Boxscore	Pts: Krikke 19; Rebs: Kreišmontas 6 Asts: Ashton-Langford, Sidarevičius 5 PIR: Kreišmontas 20	Arena: Active Vilnius Arena; Attendance: 1,285; Referees: Gvidas Gedvilas, Gabrielius Simonavičius, Ignas Jablonskas

25 April 2026 27	Rytas	102–80	Juventus	Vilnius
19:10	Scoring by quarter: 25–18, 23–13, 23–18, 31–31
	Pts: Harding 24; Rebs: Gudaitis 8 Asts: Smith 9 PIR: Harding 31	Boxscore	Pts: Valinskas 16; Rebs: Vraneš 10; Asts: Johnson, Valinskas 4 PIR: Vraneš 17	Arena: Active Vilnius Arena; Attendance: 1,757; Referees: Saulius Račys, Gintaras Mačiulis, Aurimas Borusas

27 April 2026 28	Rytas	102–72	Šiauliai	Vilnius
18:30	Scoring by quarter: 22–22, 19–18, 32–14, 29–18
	Pts: Echodas, Sargiūnas 14; Rebs: Gudaitis, Paliukėnas 6 Asts: Marčiulionis, Smith 4 PIR: Gudaitis 30	Boxscore	Pts: McKnight 19; Rebs: Simanić 9 Asts: Fofana 4 PIR: Simanić 23	Arena: Active Vilnius Arena; Attendance: 2,298; Referees: Artūras Šukys, Gintaras Mačiulis, Gabrielius Simonavičius

29 April 2026 29	Neptūnas	91–98	Rytas	Klaipėda
18:30	Scoring by quarter: 24–24, 21–20, 22–20, 24–32
	Pts: Lomažs 24; Rebs: Majauskas 6 Asts: Velička 13; PIR: Lomažs 22	Boxscore	Pts: Gudaitis, Masiulis 19; Rebs: Masiulis 7 Asts: Smith 10; PIR: Masiulis 26	Arena: Švyturys Arena; Attendance: 2,527; Referees: Artūras Šukys, Juozas Barkauskas, Dovydas Kairys

3 May 2026 30	Lietkabelis	96–71	Rytas	Panevėžys
16:50	Scoring by quarter: 24–19, 24–14, 26–22, 22–16
	Pts: Mutić 22; Rebs: Danusevičius 10; Asts: Radžius 4 PIR: Mutić 26	Boxscore	Pts: Masiulis 15; Rebs: Marčiulionis 8 Asts: Marčiulionis 6 PIR: Marčiulionis 20	Arena: Kalnapilio Arena; Attendance: 1,778; Referees: Gytis Vilius, Gvidas Gedvilas, Vidmantas Rušinas

13 May 2026 31	Nevėžis-Paskolų klubas	88–117	Rytas	Kėdainiai
18:45	Scoring by quarter: 22–32, 13–27, 33–28, 20–30
	Pts: Miguel 24; Rebs: Montvila, Pohto 6 Asts: Ramanauskas 8 PIR: Montvila 22	Boxscore	Pts: Echodas 20; Rebs: Echodas, Urbonas 7 Asts: Paliukėnas 8 PIR: Echodas 25	Arena: Kėdainiai Arena; Attendance: 1,192; Referees: Jurgis Laurinavičius, Aurimas Borusas, Ignas Jablonskas

16 May 2026 32	Gargždai	103–98	Rytas	Gargždai
19:10	Scoring by quarter: 22–25, 25–30, 25–19, 31–24
	Pts: Pipkins 28; Rebs: Petrilevičius, Turner 5 Asts: Turner 6 PIR: Turner 29	Boxscore	Pts: Masiulis, Sargiūnas 23; Rebs: Masiulis 7 Asts: Marčiulionis 7 PIR: Masiulis 32	Arena: Gargždų Arena; Attendance: 1,490; Referees: Gintaras Mačiulis, Gabrielius Simonavičius, Dovydas Kairys

=== LKL Playoffs ===
==== Quarterfinals ====
21 May 2026 Game 1	Juventus	92–84 (Series: 1–0)	Rytas	Utena
18:30	Scoring by quarter: 29–27, 26–22, 16–16, 21–19
	Pts: Lewis; Rebs: Lewis, Uleckas 8 Asts: Valinskas 5 PIR: Lewis 25	Boxscore	Pts: Gudaitis 16; Rebs: Gudaitis 8 Asts: Marčiulionis 5 PIR: Masiulis 22	Arena: Utena Arena; Attendance: 1,693; Referees: Gytis Vilius, Gintaras Mačiulis, Vidmantas Rušinas

23 May 2026 Game 2	Rytas	95–101 (Series: 0–2)	Juventus	Vilnius
16:50	Scoring by quarter: 32–30, 24–20, 27–30, 12–21
	Pts: Smith 20; Rebs: Gudaitis 9 Asts: Sargiūnas, Marčiulionis 5 PIR: Smith 18	Boxscore	Pts: Diarra 30; Rebs: Šaulys, Valinskas 6 Asts: three players 4 PIR: Lewis 34	Arena: Active Vilnius Arena; Attendance: 2,058; Referees: Artūras Šukys, Gvidas Gedvilas, Andžej Urbanovič

=== Basketball Champions League ===
==== Regular season ====
===== Group A =====
Pos	Team	Pld	W	L	PF	PA	PD	Pts	Qualification
1	(Lithuanian Basketball Federation) Rytas	6	4	2	564	534	+30	10	Advance to round of 16
2	(German Basketball Federation) MLP Academics Heidelberg	6	3	3	502	507	−5	9	Advance to play-ins
3	(Hellenic Basketball Federation) Promitheas Vikos Cola	6	3	3	481	507	−26	9	Advance to play-ins
4	(Polish Basketball Federation) Legia Warszawa	6	2	4	468	467	+1	8	

Source: FIBA

==== Regular season matches ====
7 October 2025 1	Rytas (Lithuanian Basketball Federation)	93–85	(Polish Basketball Federation) Legia Warsaw	Twinsbet Arena
20:00	Scoring by quarter: 29–23, 21–25, 24–22, 19–15
	Pts: Harding 20; Rebs: Wiley 8 Asts: Radzevičius 3 PIR: Harding 19	Boxscore	Pts: Graves 23; Rebs: Hunter 10; Asts: Graves 8 PIR: Graves 26	Attendance: 4,037; Referees: Petar Pesic, Fernando Calatrava, Elvis Binders-Coders

15 October 2025 2	MLP Academics Heidelberg (German Basketball Federation)	92–83	(Lithuanian Basketball Federation) Rytas	SNP Dome
19:30	Scoring by quarter: 21–26, 21–21, 28–20, 22–16
	Pts: Horne 33; Rebs: Neskovic 8 Asts: Mi. Weathers 9 PIR: Horne 28	Boxscore	Pts: Sargiūnas 15; Rebs: Gudaitis 8 Asts: Sargiūnas 5 PIR: Sargiūnas 15	Attendance: 3,221; Referees: Ademir Zurapovic, Valenstin Oliot, Çisil Güngör

22 October 2025 3	Rytas (Lithuanian Basketball Federation)	98–79	(Hellenic Basketball Federation) Promitheas Vikos Cola	Twinsbet Arena
19:30	Scoring by quarter: 29–19, 24–20, 24–18, 21–22
	Pts: Gudaitis 19; Rebs: Masiulis 11; Asts: Walker 6 PIR: Masiulis 22	Boxscore	Pts: Coleman 18; Rebs: Coleman 6 Asts: McCullum 4 PIR: Coleman 23	Attendance: 4,199; Referees: Yohan Rosso, Julio Anaya, Lorenzo Baldini

5 November 2025 4	Rytas (Lithuanian Basketball Federation)	116–90	(German Basketball Federation) MLP Academics Heidelberg	Twinsbet Arena
19:30	Scoring by quarter: 31–23, 28–22, 33–21, 24–24
	Pts: Harding 30; Rebs: Radzevičius 9 Asts: Walker 7 PIR: Harding 26	Boxscore	Pts: Mi. Weathers 23; Rebs: Ma. Weathers 7 Asts: McClain 5 PIR: Mi. Weathers 24	Attendance: 4,011; Referees: Luis Castillo, Mihkel Männiste, Calentin Oliot

18 November 2025 5	Legia Warsaw (Polish Basketball Federation)	77–79	(Lithuanian Basketball Federation) Rytas	Arena COS Torwar
19:00	Scoring by quarter: 25–22, 17–20, 16–17, 19–20
	Pts: Pluta Jr. 23; Rebs: Graves 8 Asts: Pluta Jr.8; PIR: Pluta Jr.22	Boxscore	Pts: Harding 22; Rebs: Radzevičius 9 Asts: Radzevičius 3 PIR: Harding 20	Attendance: 4,600; Referees: Yohan Rosso, Julio Anaya, Josip Jurcevic

17 December 2025 6	Promitheas Vikos Cola (Hellenic Basketball Federation)	111–95	(Lithuanian Basketball Federation) Rytas	Dimitris Tofalos Arena
19:00	Scoring by quarter: 18–32, 34–22, 35–22, 24–19
	Pts: Gray 30; Rebs: Karagiannidis 11; Asts: Harris Jr. 7 PIR: Gray 28	Boxscore	Pts: Sargiūnas 24; Rebs: Gudaitis 15; Asts: Walker 7 PIR: Gudaitis 32	Attendance: 1,093; Referees: Ariadna Chueca, Ventsislav Velikov, Mehmet Şahin

==== Round of 16 ====
===== Group I =====
Pos	Team	Pld	W	L	PF	PA	PD	Pts	Qualification
1	(Lithuanian Basketball Federation) Rytas	6	4	2	560	508	+52	10	Advance to quarter-finals
2	(Turkish Basketball Federation) Galatasaray MCT Technic	6	4	2	520	501	+19	10	Advance to quarter-finals
3	(French Federation of Basketball) Le Mans	6	4	2	538	527	+11	10	
4	(Israeli Basketball Association) Hapoel Netanel Holon	6	0	6	511	593	−82	6	

Source: Round of 16 Standings

==== Round of 16 matches ====
20 January 2026 1	Rytas (Lithuanian Basketball Federation)	106–81	(Israel) Hapoel Netanel Holon	Vilnius
19:30	Scoring by quarter: 20–22, 25–11, 33–25, 28–23
	Pts: Walker 20; Rebs: Caroline 9 Asts: Smith 8 PIR: Walker 22	Boxscore	Pts: Munford 23; Rebs: Sanogo 8 Asts: Munford 6 PIR: Munford 24	Arena: Twinsbet Arena; Attendance: 4,235; Referees: Boris Krejic, Martins Kozlovskis, Ventsislav Velikov

27 January 2026 2	Rytas (Lithuanian Basketball Federation)	85–89(OT)	(Turkish Basketball Federation) Galatasaray MCT Technic	Vilnius
19:30	Scoring by quarter: 20–16, 13–23, 24–16, 19–21, Overtime: 9–13
	Pts: Harding 28; Rebs: Four players 6 Asts: Smith 7 PIR: Harding, Smith 21	Boxscore	Pts: McCollum 24; Rebs: White Jr. 14; Asts: Korkmaz 6 PIR: Meeks 22	Arena: Twinsbet Arena; Attendance: 5,500; Referees: Wojciech Liszka, Lorenzo Baldini, Martin Vulic

4 February 2026 3	Le Mans (French Federation of Basketball)	78–72	(Lithuanian Basketball Federation) Rytas	Le Mans
21:00	Scoring by quarter: 17–18, 15–25, 25–12, 21–17
	Pts: Berhanemeskel 20; Rebs: Dufeal 8 Asts: Hudgins 5 PIR: Dufeal 16	Boxscore	Pts: Masiulis 11; Rebs: Gudaitis, Wiley 6 Asts: Bruhnke 5 PIR: Wiley 17	Arena: Antarès; Attendance: 2,904; Referees: Luis Castillo, Georgios Poursanidis, Michal Proc

10 February 2026 4	Hapoel Netanel Holon (Israel)	98–106	(Lithuanian Basketball Federation) Rytas	Samokov
20:30	Scoring by quarter: 25–26, 26–28, 22–28, 25–24
	Pts: Sanogo 25; Rebs: Sanogo 8 Asts: Kravitz 8 PIR: Sanogo 27	Boxscore	Pts: Sargiūnas, Walker 27; Rebs: Gudaitis 8 Asts: Smith 7 PIR: Sargiūnas 28	Arena: Arena SamElyon; Referees: Ariadna Chueca, Julio Anaya, Mihkel Männiste

11 March 2026 5	Rytas (Lithuanian Basketball Federation)	101–81	(French Federation of Basketball) Le Mans	Vilnius
19:30	Scoring by quarter: 28–25, 17–16, 24–20, 32–20
	Pts: Lukošius 18; Rebs: Sargiūnas 8 Asts: Marčiulionis 8 PIR: Lukošius 23	Boxscore	Pts: Hudgins 28; Rebs: Thomas 8 Asts: Hudgins 5 PIR: Hudgins 24	Arena: Twinsbet Arena; Attendance: 6728; Referees: Antonio Conde, Fernando Calatrava, Dariusz Zapolski

18 March 2026 6	Galatasaray MCT Technic (Turkish Basketball Federation)	81–90	(Lithuanian Basketball Federation) Rytas	Istanbul
19:00	Scoring by quarter: 22–23, 19–25, 21–16, 19–26
	Pts: McCollum 26; Rebs: White Jr. 6 Asts: Palmer Jr. 8 PIR: McCollum, Palmer Jr. 25	Boxscore	Pts: Masiulis 25; Rebs: Lukošius 7 Asts: Sargiūnas, Smith 5 PIR: Lukošius 27	Arena: Basketbol Gelişim Merkezi; Referees: Martins Kozlovskis, Julio Anaya, Ariadna Chueca

==== Playoffs ====
===== Quarterfinals =====
1 April 2026 1	Rytas (Lithuanian Basketball Federation)	77–70 (Series: 1–0)	(Czech Basketball Federation) ERA Nymburk	Vilnius
19:30	Scoring by quarter: 17–21, 24–21, 24–19, 12–9
	Pts: Harding 19; Rebs: Bruhnke 9 Asts: Smith 7 PIR: Gudaitis, Harding 16	Boxscore	Pts: Four players 10; Rebs: Perkins 7 Asts: Sehnal 4 PIR: Perkins 15	Arena: Twinsbet Arena; Attendance: 8037; Referees: Antonio Conde, Boris Krejic, Petar Pesic

7 April 2026 2	ERA Nymburk (Czech Basketball Federation)	69–70 (Series: 0–2)	(Lithuanian Basketball Federation) Rytas	Prague
19:30	Scoring by quarter: 21–21, 20–17, 19–14, 9–18
	Pts: Perkins 13; Rebs: Kříž 8 Asts: Bohačík 7 PIR: Perkins 19	Boxscore	Pts: Harding 17; Rebs: Masiulis 10; Asts: Smith 5 PIR: Masiulis 22	Arena: Královka Arena; Attendance: 2,350; Referees: Luis Castillo, Péter Praksch, Martin Vulic

==== Final Four ====
7 May 2026 Semifinals	Rytas (Lithuanian Basketball Federation)	87–69	(Spain) La Laguna Tenerife	Badalona
19:00	Scoring by quarter: 18–17, 22–17, 22–19, 25–16
	Pts: Harding 29; Rebs: Gudaitis 9 Asts: Marčiulionis, Smith 5 PIR: Harding 24	Boxscore	Pts: Huertas 21; Rebs: Shermadini 7 Asts: Huertas 6 PIR: Huertas 20	Arena: Pavelló Olímpic de Badalona; Attendance: 8,476; Referees: Ademir Zurapovic, Lorenzo Baldini, Paulo Marques

9 May 2026 Final	AEK Betsson (Hellenic Basketball Federation)	86–92(OT)	(Lithuanian Basketball Federation) Rytas	Badalona
21:00	Scoring by quarter: 25–15, 17–10, 21–20, 17–35, Overtime: 6–12
	Pts: Nunnally 23; Rebs: Feazell 8 Asts: Bartley 4 PIR: Feazell, Nunnally 22	Boxscore	Pts: Lukošius 23; Rebs: Bruhnke 12; Asts: Smith 9 PIR: Lukošius 23	Arena: Pavelló Olímpic de Badalona; Referees: Yohan Rosso, Martins Kozlovskis, Julio Anaya

=== King Mindaugas Cup ===
==== Quarterfinals ====
23 December 2025 Game 1	Šiauliai	82–97	Rytas	Šiauliai
20:00	Scoring by quarter: 25–32, 17–27, 24–19, 16–19
	Pts: Henderson 15; Rebs: Pleikys 9 Asts: McKnight 7 PIR: Pleikys 16	Boxscore	Pts: Walker 25; Rebs: Gudaitis 10; Asts: Walker 10; PIR: Walker 31	Arena: Šiauliai Arena; Attendance: 3,415; Referees: Juozas Barkauskas, Andžej Urbanovič, Jonas Lazauskas

15 January 2026 Game 2	Rytas	99–94 (196–176 agg.)	Šiauliai	Vilnius
18:00	Scoring by quarter: 19–22, 33–22, 23–26, 24–24
	Pts: Sargiūnas 18; Rebs: Gudaitis 7 Asts: Smith 7 PIR: Smith 26	Boxscore	Pts: Henderson 26; Rebs: Simanić 6 Asts: McKnight 9 PIR: Fofana 26	Arena: Twinsbet Arena; Attendance: 2,158; Referees: Gintaras Mačiulis, Dovydas Kairys, Tomas Stankevičius

==== Final Four ====
21 February 2026 Semifinals	Rytas	106–89	Lietkabelis	Šiauliai
18:45	Scoring by quarter: 29–20, 27–17, 26–22, 24–30
	Pts: Sargiūnas 29; Rebs: Gudaitis 7 Asts: Smith 7 PIR: Sargiūnas 31	Boxscore	Pts: Morris 16; Rebs: Maldūnas 6 Asts: Radičević 8 PIR: Furmanavičius 20	Arena: Šiauliai Arena; Attendance: 3,963; Referees: Gytis Vilius, Saulius Račys, Juozas Barkauskas

22 February 2026 Final	Žalgiris	101–85	Rytas	Šiauliai
18:00	Scoring by quarter: 25–21, 37–16, 22–27, 17–21
	Pts: Wright 27; Rebs: Wright, Lô 6 Asts: Francisco 10; PIR: Francisco 33	Boxscore	Pts: Sargiūnas 16; Rebs: Gudaitis 6 Asts: Smith 6 PIR: Smith 18	Arena: Šiauliai Arena; Attendance: 5,450; Referees: Gytis Vilius, Artūras Šukys, Saulius Račys

== Statistics ==
=== LKL ===
Player	GP	GS	MPG	2FG%	3FG%	FT%	RPG	APG	SPG	BPG	PPG	PIR
Augustas Marčiulionis	15	3	23:04	56.4%	29.8%	70.8%	3.6	4.9	1	–	12.7	14.9
Jacob Wiley	17	11	21:16	68.4%	38.1%	86.4%	5.1	1.7	0.5	1.1	8.9	12.8
Jordan Walker	16	12	23:29	30.9%	37.5%	88.1%	1.4	4.4	0.9	0.1	13.8	10.6
Gytis Radzevičius	9	9	26:48	48.8%	50%	78.9%	6	2.1	0.7	0.2	10.4	16.1
Artūras Gudaitis	28	27	21:05	64.7%	–	64.4%	7.3	1	0.5	1	12.5	18.6
Kay Bruhnke	32	19	21:11	61.8%	31.8%	82.4%	3.3	2.2	0.4	0.6	6	7.6
Jerrick Harding	24	7	21:44	60.6%	43.7%	93.9%	2.1	2.4	0.7	0.3	17.2	16.9
Artūras Vilutis	2	0	7:11	33.3%	–	–	0.5	0.5	–	–	1	0.5
Martynas Echodas	11	4	16:49	51.8%	–	65%	5.9	0.7	0.6	0.4	10.2	12.3
Ignas Urbonas	13	0	13:04	59.3%	35.3%	100%	2.3	1.6	0.5	0.1	4.3	5.9
Nikas Stuknys	15	0	7:01	64.7%	–	–	0.5	1.1	0.2	–	1.5	1.2
Gytis Masiulis	32	3	18:20	72.8%	36.8%	80.2%	4.3	1.1	0.6	0.8	10.7	14.3
Gantas Križanauskas	8	0	9:18	83.3%	25%	33.3%	0.9	0.5	0.3	–	2.5	1.4
Jordan Caroline	12	1	16:14	65.7%	31%	74.1%	4.1	0.7	0.1	0.2	7.8	8.4
Danielius Kasparas	3	0	3:10	–	–	–	0.7	–	–	–	–	-0.3
Simonas Lukošius	32	13	20:31	64.8%	33%	91.4%	2.4	1.5	0.7	0.2	6.6	5.9
Ignas Sargiūnas	32	19	25:29	65.2%	41.1%	86.4%	2.7	2.8	1.4	0.3	12.9	14.2
Speedy Smith	19	17	22:55	36.7%	37.8%	71.4%	2.8	4.9	0.9	0.1	7.4	9.3
Martynas Paliukėnas	23	20	18:06	55.1%	29%	51.7%	2.6	2.4	0.9	0.4	5.6	6.4
TOTAL				60.2%	36.4%	76.6%	37.5	21.4	6.8	4	92.6	111.6

Source: LKL

=== Basketball Champions League ===
Player	GP	MPG	2FG%	3FG%	FT%	RPG	APG	SPG	BPG	PPG	PIR
Jacob Wiley	9	22:00	69.2%	16.7%	60%	5.8	0.9	0.9	0.7	7.3	11.4
Jordan Walker	10	19:54	37.9%	34.8%	91.2%	1.5	3.8	0.5	–	12.5	9.2
Augustas Marčiulionis	6	18:00	45%	28.6%	81.8%	2.7	4.2	0.3	–	5.5	7.7
Gytis Radzevičius	5	28:12	50%	44.4%	93.3%	6.6	2	0.4	0.2	11.6	14.8
Artūras Gudaitis	16	21:54	50.5%	–	65.7%	6.6	0.9	0.5	1.5	9.9	13.4
Kay Bruhnke	16	22:18	65.6%	31.7%	59.5%	4.9	1.7	0.4	0.8	7.6	10.1
Jerrick Harding	13	25:24	52.7%	32.2%	83.8%	2.4	2.4	0.8	0.4	19.4	15.6
Martynas Echodas	3	5:30	33.3%	–	50%	–	–	0.3	0.7	1	1
Ignas Urbonas	1	4:24	–	–	–	–	4	–	–	–	3
Nikas Stuknys	3	6:00	66.7%	–	–	0.7	1.3	–	–	2.7	1.3
Gytis Masiulis	16	17:36	58.3%	41.9%	77.8%	4.3	0.6	0.4	0.6	9.9	11.7
Gantas Križanauskas	2	10:12	33.3%	50%	–	1	–	–	–	2.5	2
Jordan Caroline	9	14:12	70.6%	15.4%	37.5%	3.1	0.9	0.3	0.2	4	5.1
Simonas Lukošius	16	18:36	41.7%	51.6%	86.7%	3	1	0.5	0.1	8.3	9.6
Ignas Sargiūnas	16	25:18	55.6%	22.7%	91.7%	3.1	2.4	0.9	0.3	11.2	10.1
Speedy Smith	10	25:06	62.5%	31.6%	85.7%	3.6	5.7	1.3	0.2	8.6	12.4
Martynas Paliukėnas	9	15:48	66.7%	–	40%	2.6	1.8	1	0.2	3.6	6.1
TOTAL			54.7%	33.8%	75.3%	41.7	19.1	6	4.5	90.6	102.4

Source: Basketball Champions League
