= Martynas Sajus =

Lithuanian basketball player

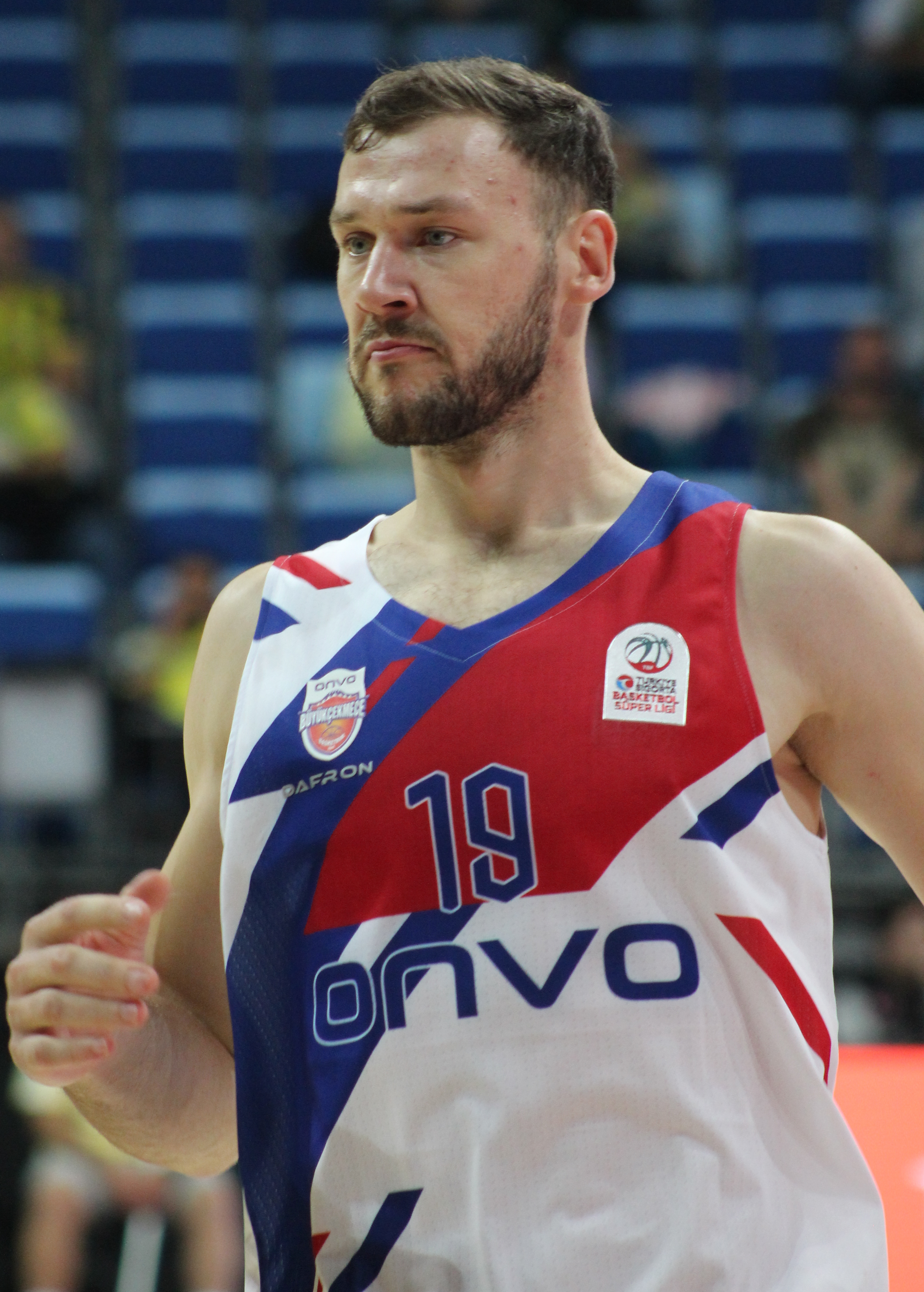
- Sajus with Büyükçekmece Basketbol in 2024

No. 19 – Bursaspor
- Position: Center
- League: Basketbol Süper Ligi

Personal information
- Born: 22 February 1996 (age 30) Kelmė, Lithuania
- Listed height: 2.08 m (6 ft 10 in)
- Listed weight: 112 kg (247 lb)

Career information
- NBA draft: 2018: undrafted
- Playing career: 2014–present

Career history
- 2014–2018: Žalgiris Kaunas
- 2014–2016: →Žalgiris-2 Kaunas
- 2016–2017: →Polpharma Starogard Gdański
- 2018–2019: Wilki Morskie Szczecin
- 2019–2020: Lietkabelis Panevėžys
- 2020–2021: Manresa
- 2021–2022: Medi Bayreuth
- 2022–2023: Büyükçekmece Basketbol
- 2023–2024: Río Breogán
- 2024–2025: Büyükçekmece Basketbol
- 2025–2026: Petkim Spor
- 2026–present: Bursaspor

Career highlights
- LKL champion (2016, 2018); King Mindaugas Cup winner (2018)

Martynas Sajus (born 22 February 1996) is a Lithuanian professional basketball player for Bursaspor of the Turkish Basketbol Süper Ligi (BSL).

== Professional career ==
On 9 July 2014, Sajus signed a five-year (3+2) contract with Žalgiris Kaunas and started to play for the club's reserve team in the NKL. In his first season, he averaged 5.4 points per game and 3.9 rebounds per game. In December 2015, because of injuries in the Žalgiris main team, he was registered for a LKL match against BC Dzūkija and made a debut by scoring 2 points. On 29 December 2015, he made his EuroLeague debut against Laboral Kutxa playing only 4 seconds.

On August 11, 2016, Sajus was loaned to Polpharma Starogard Gdański for the 2016–17 season. After a successful season in Poland, he was brought back by Žalgiris on August 12, 2017. He again split his time between Žalgiris and its reserve team.

On July 3, 2018, Sajus parted ways with the team and signed with Wilki Morskie Szczecin of the Polish PLK.

On June 6, 2020, Sajus joined Baxi Manresa of the Liga ACB on a one-year deal.

On June 25, 2021, Sajus signed with Medi Bayreuth of the Basketball Bundesliga.

On July 31, 2022, he signed with Büyükçekmece of the Turkish Basketball Super League (BSL).

On 17 July 2023, Sajus signed a one-year deal with Río Breogán of the Liga ACB.

On July 30, 2024, he signed with Büyükçekmece Basketbol of the Basketbol Süper Ligi (BSL) for a second stint.

On June 16, 2025, he signed with Petkim Spor of the Basketbol Süper Ligi (BSL).

On November 17, 2026, he signed with Bursaspor Basketbol of the Basketbol Süper Ligi (BSL).

== National team career ==
Sajus won gold medal with the Lithuanian team during the 2017 Summer Universiade after defeating the United States' team 74–85 in the final.
