= 2015–16 LKL season =

LKL
- Season: 2015–16
- Duration: October 2015 – June 2016
- Games played: 180 (regular season)
- Teams: 10

Regular season
- Season MVP: (Lithuania) Vytautas Šulskis

Finals
- Champions: Žalgiris (18th title)
- Runners-up: Neptūnas
- Finals MVP: (Ukraine) Jerome Randle

Statistical leaders
Points	(United States) Derrick Low	15.7
Rebounds	(Egypt) Assem Marei	7.7
Assists	(Lithuania) Rolandas Alijevas	6.1

Records
- Biggest home win: Lietuvos rytas 116–54 Nevėžis (17 October 2015)
- Biggest away win: Nevėžis 54–98 Žalgiris (25 January 2016)
- Highest scoring: Šiauliai 112–110 Juventus (21 October 2015)
- Winning streak: 10 games Žalgiris
- Losing streak: 13 games Nevėžis
- Highest attendance: 10,790; Žalgiris 79–70 Lietuvos rytas (25 October 2015)
- Lowest attendance: 221; Pieno žvaigždės 79–54 Nevėžis (16 January 2016)
- Average attendance: 2,030
- All statistics correct as of 6 June 2016.

The 2015–16 Lietuvos krepšinio lyga was the 23rd season of the top-tier level professional basketball league of Lithuania, the Lietuvos krepšinio lyga (LKL). The regular season started on 30 September 2015.

Žalgiris was the defending champion.

== Competition format ==
During the regular season, all teams played 36 games. The top eight teams, after playing the whole 40 games, each joined the playoffs, in the quarterfinals, that were played in a best-of-three games format. The semifinals were also played in this format.

The final round was played between the two winners of the semifinals. The final series for the first place was played in a best-of-seven format, while the series for the third place was played in a best-of-five format.

== Teams ==
Location of teams in 2015–16 LKL

Team	Location	Arena	Capacity
Dzūkija	Alytus	Alytus Arena	5,500
Juventus	Utena	Utena Arena	2,000
Lietkabelis	Panevėžys	Cido Arena	5,950
Lietuvos rytas	Vilnius	Lietuvos rytas Arena; Siemens Arena	2,500; 10,000
Neptūnas	Klaipėda	Švyturys Arena	6,200
Nevėžis	Kėdainiai	Kėdainiai Arena	2,200
Pieno žvaigždės	Pasvalys	Pieno žvaigždės Arena	1,200
Šiauliai	Šiauliai	Šiauliai Arena	5,700
Vytautas	Prienai-Birštonas	Prienai Arena	1,500
Žalgiris	Kaunas	Žalgiris Arena	15,688

== League table ==
Pos	Team	Pld	W	L	PF	PA	PD	Qualification
1	Žalgiris	36	32	4	3112	2540	+572	Qualification to playoffs
2	Lietuvos rytas	36	28	8	3052	2617	+435	Qualification to playoffs
3	Neptūnas	36	19	17	2795	2678	+117	Qualification to playoffs
4	Vytautas	36	19	17	2831	2822	+9	Qualification to playoffs
5	Juventus	36	18	18	2833	2985	−152	Qualification to playoffs
6	Šiauliai	36	18	18	2893	2886	+7	Qualification to playoffs
7	Lietkabelis	36	16	20	2705	2847	−142	Qualification to playoffs
8	Pieno žvaigždės	36	14	22	2880	3004	−124	Qualification to playoffs
9	Nevėžis	36	8	28	2598	3017	−419	
10	Dzūkija	36	8	28	2418	2771	−353	

Source: LKL

== Results ==
=== Rounds 1 and 2 ===
Home \ Away	DZŪ	JUV	LTK	LRY	NEP	NEV	PŽV	ŠIA	VYT	ŽAL
Dzūkija		62–75	64–63	82–91	62–67	57–69	78–70	68–73	77–79	72–80
Juventus	71–66		80–63	92–88	79–76	88–92	76–74	72–70	58–79	65–83
Lietkabelis	76–67	68–70		67–91	75–80	96–75	91–78	78–72	87–81	69–95
Lietuvos rytas	81–69	100–77	87–67		116–54	80–76	96–69	82–61	81–74	68–82
Neptūnas	76–71	82–65	73–65	62–72		77–66	90–79	74–83	82–87	73–82
Nevėžis	60–49	80–81	70–87	72–83	56–81		73–78	94–88	61–78	67–90
Pieno žvaigždės	83–68	83–71	64–86	71–89	89–83	85–61		68–71	71–79	71–88
Šiauliai	71–60	110–112	86–74	87–95	68–75	82–80	77–73		106–75	64–78
Vytautas	89–59	89–65	87–68	79–89	72–85	79–85	92–72	78–76		70–82
Žalgiris	78–43	90–78	103–74	79–70	81–71	82–88	93–88	80–59	94–77	

Legend: Blue = home team win; Yellow = draw; Red = away team win.

=== Rounds 3 and 4 ===
Home \ Away	DZŪ	JUV	LTK	LRY	NEP	NEV	PŽV	ŠIA	VYT	ŽAL
Dzūkija		88–77	70–83	58–93	58–55	60–53	75–71	79–86	67–61	69–79
Juventus	82–75		84–70	59–97	104–89	89–73	83–100	90–66	88–61	65–88
Lietkabelis	82–74	84–82		75–65	72–80	76–66	82–83	75–88	67–65	70–90
Lietuvos rytas	88–59	83–82	91–69		95–88	87–70	95–74	79–58	93–84	78–72
Neptūnas	85–65	101–74	70–74	70–62		103–69	95–91	68–73	70–58	70–78
Nevėžis	91–81	81–93	76–81	59–78	69–77		87–95	82–78	72–78	54–98
Pieno žvaigždės	78–58	85–75	84–90	81–77	54–88	79–54		93–87	91–100	101–109
Šiauliai	91–69	109–105	99–82	80–81	79–74	112–90	90–94		90–82	64–80
Vytautas	63–77	96–90	84–76	80–77	82–72	80–76	94–86	68–57		71–79
Žalgiris	101–62	84–86	92–59	79–74	89–57	95–73	93–88	79–82	96–80	

Legend: Blue = home team win; Yellow = draw; Red = away team win.

== Attendances ==
Attendances include playoff games:

Pos	Team	Total	High	Low	Average	Change
1	Neptūnas	95,051	6,040	1,960	3,960	+27.4%
2	Žalgiris	96,014	10,790	1,426	3,841	+12.5%
3	Lietuvos rytas	60,860	9,850	750	2,536	+82.1%
4	Dzūkija	41,617	4,503	1,145	2,312	+40.6%
5	Šiauliai	31,487	5,465	381	1,574	+14.4%
6	Lietkabelis	28,622	2,907	600	1,506	+84.6%
7	Juventus	31,440	2,238	889	1,429	−3.1%
8	Nevėžis	16,088	1,900	380	894	+32.4%
9	Vytautas	14,540	1,400	400	692	+169.3%
10	Pieno žvaigždės	10,582	1,100	221	557	+31.7%
	League total	426,301	10,790	221	2,030	+36.5%

Updated to games played on 6 June 2016
Source: LKL

== Playoffs ==
Seeded teams play at home games 1, 3, 5 and 7.

Quarterfinals
Žalgiris	102	84	95
Pieno žvaigždės	66	71	81
Vytautas	98	88	65	78	79
Juventus	91	93	66	73	83
Lietuvos rytas	79	85	83
Lietkabelis	74	66	78
Neptūnas	83	84	90	87
Šiauliai	77	93	85	86

Semifinals
Žalgiris	91	88	80
Juventus	76	73	72
Lietuvos rytas	71	68	66	74	72
Neptūnas	83	70	64	73	73

Finals
Žalgiris	83	54	78	74	97
Neptūnas	72	76	54	50	70

Third place
Lietuvos rytas	85	83	89
Juventus	83	78	81

== Awards ==
=== MVP of the Month ===
Month	Player	Team	PIR	Source
2015
October	(Lithuania) Vytautas Šulskis	Vytautas	18.1	
November	(Lithuania) Egidijus Dimša	Juventus	24.8	
December	(United States) Jerai Grant	Neptūnas	20.8	
2016
January	(United States) Spencer Butterfield	Juventus	25.6	
February	(Lithuania) Paulius Jankūnas	Žalgiris	21.6	
March	(United States) Spencer Butterfield	Juventus	23	
April	(Lithuania) Rokas Giedraitis	Šiauliai	20	

== Sponsors ==
- Beko (general)
- Energijos tiekimas
- Orakulas
- If P&C Insurance
- Bosca
- KG Group
- Mercedes-Benz
- Turkish Airlines
- Vytautas
- West Express
- Molten
- Tele-loto
- IDW Esperanza
- Spalding
- SportoTelevizija
- MBT MEDIA BENZ
- LRT
- SportoTV.lt
- Delfi
- Radiocentras
- Krepsinis.net

== Clubs in European competitions ==
Team	Competition	Progress
Žalgiris	EuroLeague	Top 16
Neptūnas	EuroCup	Top 32
Lietuvos rytas	EuroCup	Regular season
Juventus	FIBA Europe Cup	Eightfinals
Pieno žvaigždes	FIBA Europe Cup	Second round
Šiauliai	FIBA Europe Cup	Regular season
