= Šiauliai BMX Track =

BMX track in Lithuania

Coordinates: 55°55′3″N 23°16′41″E

Šiauliai BMX Track is a bicycle motocross track in Šiauliai, Lithuania. Main BMX facility in Lithuania that are eligible to host international championships.

Located near to Šiauliai Arena. Opened in 2008, instead of old BMX track. Track cost over 3 million LTL.

Home base for first Olympic Lithuanian BMX cyclist Vilma Rimšaitė.
