= Lukas Aukštikalnis =

Lithuanian basketball player (born 1995)

Herons Basket Montecatini
- Position: Shooting guard
- League: Serie B Nazionale

Personal information
- Born: August 19, 1995 (age 31) Panevežys, Lithuania
- Listed height: 6 ft 5 in (1.96 m)
- Listed weight: 176 lb (80 kg)

Career information
- Playing career: 2012–present

Career history
- 2012–2018: Lietkabelis
- 2017: →Šiauliai
- 2018–2019: Huesca
- 2019: Pieno žvaigždės
- 2020: L'ALS Basket Andrézieux-Bouthéon
- 2021-2022: Sūduva-Mantinga
- 2022-2023: Laguna București
- 2023-2024: Andrea Costa Imola
- 2024-2025: Pallacanestro Roseto
- 2025-present: Herons Basket Montecatini

Lukas Aukštikalnis (born August 19, 1995) is a Lithuanian professional basketball player. Standing at 6 ft 5 in (1.96 m), he mainly plays at the shooting guard position.

== Professional career ==
In the 2012–13 season, Aukštikalnis signed his first professional contract with BC Lietkabelis. He played in Lietkabelis from 2012 to 2013 season to 2016–2017 season, when on January 26, 2017, were loaned out to BC Šiauliai. In first game against BC Dzūkija, Lukas recorded 23 points, 6 rebounds, 1 assist and made 30 EFF becoming week MVP. On August 9, 2018, Aukštikalnis signed with Levitec Huesca of the LEB Oro.
