= Panagiotis Kalaitzakis =

Greek basketball player (born 1999)

Panos Kalaitzakis Πάνος Καλαϊτζάκης
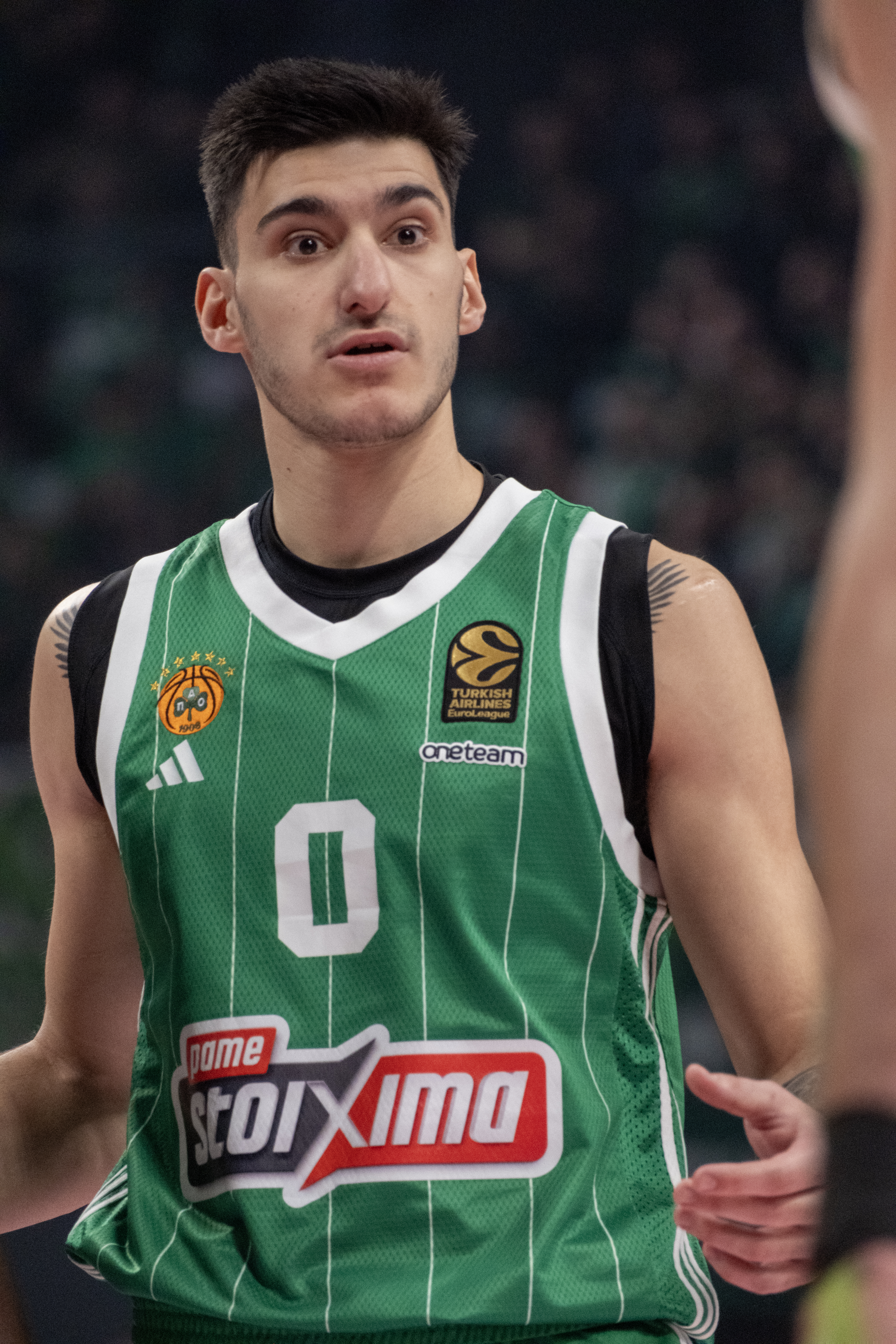
- Kalaitzakis with Panathinaikos in 2025

No. 0 – Panathinaikos
- Position: Shooting guard / small forward
- League: Greek Basketball League; EuroLeague

Personal information
- Born: 2 January 1999 (age 27) Heraklion, Crete, Greece
- Listed height: 2.00 m (6 ft 7 in)
- Listed weight: 92 kg (203 lb)

Career information
- NBA draft: 2021: undrafted
- Playing career: 2016–present

Career history
- 2016–2018: Aris Thessaloniki
- 2018–2019: Holargos
- 2019–2021: Nevėžis
- 2021–2022: Lietkabelis
- 2022–present: Panathinaikos

Career highlights
- EuroLeague champion (2024); Greek League champion (2024); 2x Greek Cup winner (2025, 2026); Greek League steals leader (2025); 2x Greek League All-Star (2022, 2023); Lithuanian League Most Improved Player (2022)
Medals
Event	1st	2nd	3rd
FIBA EuroBasket	0	0	1
Total	0	0	1
Men's basketball
Representing Greece
EuroBasket
Bronze medal – third place	2025 Cyprus–Finland–Poland–Latvia	

Panagiotis "Panos" Kalaitzakis (Greek: Παναγιώτης "Πάνος" Καλαϊτζάκης; born 2 January 1999) is a Greek professional basketball player for Panathinaikos of the Greek Basketball League (GBL) and the EuroLeague. He is 2.00 m (6'6 3/4") tall and he plays at the shooting guard and small forward positions.

== Personal life ==
Panagiotis Kalaitzakis comes from a family deeply rooted in sports. His twin brother, Georgios Kalaitzakis, is also a professional basketball player. The two have played together at clubs like Nevėžis Kėdainiai and Panathinaikos, making them one of the few twin pairs to play on the same EuroLeague team.

Their younger brother, Alexandros Kalaitzakis, born on 11 March 2003, is a professional basketball player. He currently plays as a forward for ASK Karditsas B.C. in the Greek A1 Basket League.

Their sister plays volleyball in the Greek A1 division, and their father was a basketball player in Heraklion, Crete, while their mother was a volleyball player.

== Professional career ==
=== Aris Thessaloniki (2016–2018) ===
After playing with the junior youth clubs of Aris Thessaloniki, Kalaitzakis began his professional career in the 2016–17 season, in the Greek Basket League, with the senior men's team of Aris. He made his debut during that season, gradually earning a place in the rotation.

In April 2019, Kalaitzakis declared for the 2019 NBA Draft but later withdrew his name from consideration, making him automatically eligible for the 2021 NBA Draft. He went undrafted in 2021.

=== Holargos (2018–2019) ===
After being released by Aris on 15 July 2018, he joined the newly promoted to the first-tier Greek League team of Holargos. During the 2018–19 season, he played a key role in helping the team remain competitive in the league and developed his all-around game.

=== Nevėžis Kėdainiai (2019–2021) ===
On 28 August 2019, Kalaitzakis signed with Nevėžis Kėdainiai of the Lithuanian Basketball League. During the 2019–2020 season, he played a pivotal role in the team's lineup, averaging 9.5 points, 2.9 rebounds, and 1.6 assists per game in domestic competition. His performances were instrumental in Nevėžis' efforts to compete in the league. In March 2021, Kalaitzakis signed with Lietkabelis Panevėžys of the Lithuanian Basketball League. During the 2021–2022 campaign, he continued to develop his skills, contributing to the team's efforts in both domestic and international competitions.

=== Lietkabelis Panevėžys (2021–2022) ===
On 16 March 2021, Kalaitzakis signed with Lietkabelis Panevėžys of the Lithuanian Basketball League. During the 2021–2022 campaign, he averaged 10.5 points, 4.2 rebounds, 2.9 assists, and 1.6 steals per game in domestic competition, as well as 13 points, 2.8 rebounds, 2.8 assists, and 1.6 steals per game in the EuroCup. He played a pivotal role in leading Lietkabelis to the Lithuanian League Finals and the EuroCup playoffs.

=== Panathinaikos (2022–present) ===
On 2 July 2022, Kalaitzakis signed a three-year (2+1) deal with Panathinaikos of the Greek Basket League and the EuroLeague. At Panathinaikos, he has been known for his defensive tenacity, ability to guard multiple positions, and clutch contributions in critical moments. On 25 January 2024, he recorded his highest-scoring EuroLeague game, with 17 points against Maccabi Tel Aviv. On 4 December 2024, it was reported that Kalaitzakis had agreed upon a three-year (2+1) contract extension with the Greek powerhouse.

== National team career ==
=== Greek junior national team ===
Kalaitzakis was a member of the junior national teams of Greece. With Greece's junior national teams, he played at the 2017 FIBA Europe Under-18 Championship, the 2018 FIBA Europe Under-20 Championship, and the 2019 FIBA Europe Under-20 Championship.

=== Greek senior national team ===
Kalaitzakis made his debut with the senior Greek national team during the 2023 FIBA World Cup qualifiers. In these qualifiers, he played in 7 games, averaging 3.4 points, 1.3 rebounds, and 0.1 assists per game, with an efficiency rating of 7.4.

His performances in the qualifiers were noted for his defensive contributions and versatility on the court. In February 2023, Kalaitzakis was tasked with guarding Shane Larkin, a notable assignment that showcased the coaching staff's trust in his defensive abilities.

Kalaitzakis continued to represent Greece in subsequent international competitions, including the 2024 FIBA Olympic Qualifying Tournament in Piraeus, Greece. In this tournament, he played in 4 games, averaging 3.5 points, 0.5 rebounds, and 0.8 assists per game, with an efficiency rating of 4.5.

=== 2024 Paris Olympics ===
Kalaitzakis was part of the Greek national basketball team roster for the 2024 Summer Olympics in Paris. He played in the Olympic basketball tournament, contributing to the team's efforts on the court.

The Greek team reached the quarterfinals but was eliminated by Germany with a score of 76–63, concluding their Olympic campaign. Despite the early exit, Kalaitzakis' inclusion in the Olympic roster marked a significant milestone in his international career.

== Career statistics ==
Legend
GP	Games played	GS	Games started	MPG	Minutes per game
FG%	Field-goal percentage	3P%	3-point field-goal percentage	FT%	Free-throw percentage
RPG	Rebounds per game	APG	Assists per game	SPG	Steals per game
BPG	Blocks per game	PPG	Points per game	PIR	Performance index rating
**Bold**	Career high

=== EuroLeague ===
†	Denotes seasons in which Kalaitzakis won the EuroLeague

Year	Team	GP	GS	MPG	FG%	3P%	FT%	RPG	APG	SPG	BPG	PPG	PIR
2022–23	Panathinaikos	25	7	**8.3**	.488	**.455**	.625	**1.2**	.3	.4	**.1**	**2.4**	**2.3**
2023–24†	Panathinaikos	30	0	5.9	**.510**	.250	**1.000**	.9	.2	.2	.0	2.1	2.1
2024–25	Panathinaikos	**32**	**10**	7.3	.425	.190	.722	.8	**.4**	**.5**	.0	1.8	1.3
Career		87	17	7.1	.464	.302	.738	0.9	.3	.4	.0	2.1	1.8

=== EuroCup ===
Year	Team	GP	GS	MPG	FG%	3P%	FT%	RPG	APG	SPG	BPG	PPG	PIR
2021–22	Lietkabelis	19	17	27.6	.460	.372	.747	2.8	2.8	1.3	.2	13.0	12.5
Career		19	17	27.6	.460	.372	.747	2.8	2.8	1.3	.2	13.0	12.5

=== Basketball Champions League ===
Year	Team	GP	GS	MPG	FG%	3P%	FT%	RPG	APG	SPG	BPG	PPG
2017–18	Aris Thessaloniki	5	0	1.6	.500	—	—	.4	—	—	—	0.4
Career		5	0	1.6	.500	—	—	.4	—	—	—	0.4

=== Domestic leagues ===
Year	Team	League	GP	MPG	FG%	3P%	FT%	RPG	APG	SPG	BPG	PPG
2016–17	(Greece) Aris Thessaloniki	GBL	2	3.1	.500	—	—	1.0	—	—	—	1.0
2017–18	(Greece) Aris Thessaloniki	GBL	4	4.1	.400	—	—	.2	—	—	—	1.0
2018–19	(Greece) Holargos	GBL	19	6.9	.423	.000	.533	1.2	.2	.0	—	1.6
2019–20	(Lithuania) Nevėžis	LKL	24	25.3	.380	.307	.814	3.2	1.6	1.1	**.2**	9.6
2020–21	(Lithuania) Nevėžis	LKL	22	**29.5**	.416	.285	**.822**	**4.5**	2.0	1.3	**.2**	**13.7**
2020–21	(Lithuania) Lietkabelis	LKL	22	20.0	.449	.333	.821	4.1	1.0	1.1	.1	7.5
2021–22	(Lithuania) Lietkabelis	LKL	**40**	25.8	.415	.337	.738	4.1	**2.8**	**1.5**	.1	10.5
2022–23	(Greece) Panathinaikos	GBL	31	16.4	.377	.177	.710	2.5	1.1	.8	.1	5.7
2023–24	(Greece) Panathinaikos	GBL	34	13.8	.486	.258	.647	1.5	.8	.9	**.2**	5.6
2024–25	(Greece) Panathinaikos	GBL	29	15.5	**.564**	**.435**	.611	1.6	1.0	1.3	**.2**	7.1

=== International statistics ===
Denotes years in which Kalaitzakis won a Bronze medal (third place)

Year	Tournament	National Team	GP	GS	MPG	FG%	3P%	FT%	RPG	APG	SPG	BPG	PPG
2024	Summer Olympics	Greece Men	1	0	9	–	–	.500	.0	.0	.0	.0	0.5
2025	EuroBasket 2025	Greece Men	9	0	12.2	.462	.250	.583	1.9	1.2	1.0	0.0	5.9
Career			10	0	11.9	.462	.250	.578	1.7	1.1	.9	.9	5.4
