= Anatoly Kashirov =

Russian basketball player

Personal information
- Born: 19 May 1987 (age 38) Moscow, Russian SFSR, Soviet Union
- Listed height: 2.15 m (7 ft 1 in)
- Listed weight: 112 kg (247 lb)

Career information
- NBA draft: 2009: undrafted
- Playing career: 2005–present
- Position: Center

Career history
- 2005–2008: CSKA Moscow
- 2008–2009: Spartak Saint Petersburg
- 2009–2010: Mitteldeutscher Weißenfels
- 2010–2011: Walter Tigers Tübingen
- 2011: Aris Thessaloniki
- 2011–2013: Spartak Saint Petersburg
- 2013: Ventspils
- 2013–2015: Walter Tigers Tübingen
- 2015: Khimki
- 2015–2016: Spartak Saint Petersburg
- 2016–2018: Dzūkija Alytus

Career highlights
- 2× Euroleague champion (2006, 2008)

Anatoly Kashirov (born May 19, 1987) is a Russian professional basketball player who last played for Dzūkija Alytus of the Lithuanian Basketball League.

== Career statistics ==
Legend
GP	Games played	GS	Games started	MPG	Minutes per game
FG%	Field-goal percentage	3P%	3-point field-goal percentage	FT%	Free-throw percentage
RPG	Rebounds per game	APG	Assists per game	SPG	Steals per game
BPG	Blocks per game	PPG	Points per game	PIR	Performance index rating
**Bold**	Career high

=== EuroLeague ===
†	Denotes season in which Kashirov won the EuroLeague

Year	Team	GP	GS	MPG	FG%	3P%	FT%	RPG	APG	SPG	BPG	PPG	PIR
2005–06	CSKA Moscow	5	0	4.0	.429	—	**1.000**	**1.2**	—	—	—	1.4	0.8
2006–07	CSKA Moscow	3	0	2.7	.333	—	.000	.3	**.3**	—	**.3**	0.7	0.0
2007–08†	CSKA Moscow	**8**	0	**4.4**	**.667**	—	.750	.9	—	**.3**	.1	**1.9**	**3.0**
Career		16	0	3.9	.526	—	.364	.9	.1	.1	.1	1.5	1.8
