= Anthony Perkins (disambiguation) =

Anthony Perkins (1932–1992) was an American actor.

Anthony or Tony Perkins may also refer to:

- Anthony Michael Perkins (born 1964), Saint Kitts and Nevis politician
- Tony Perkins (politician) (born 1963), American politician and president of the evangelical Family Research Council
- Tony Perkins (news anchor) (born 1959), American television news anchor

== See also ==
- Antonio Perkins (born 1981), former American football player
