= Vytautas Šulskis =

Basketball player (born 1988)

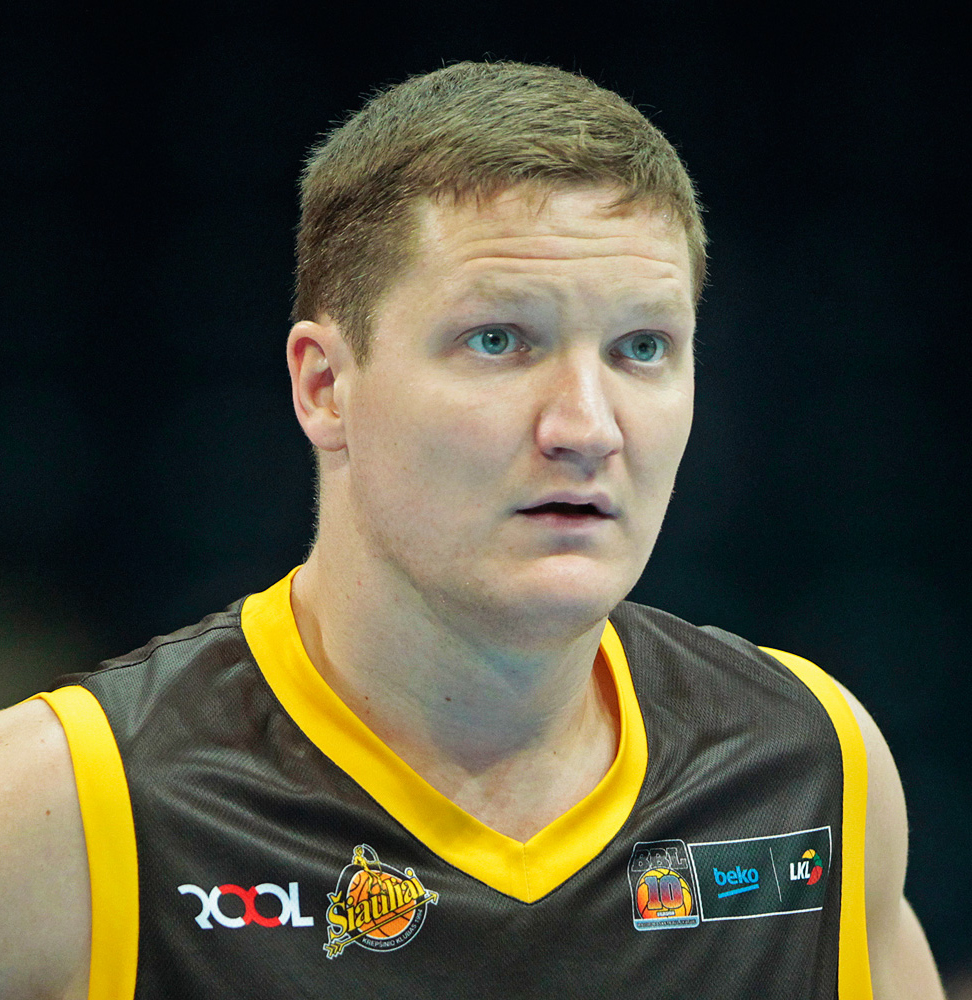
- Šulskis in 2015 with Šiauliai

BC Omega-Tauras-LSU
- Position: Small forward / power forward
- League: NKL

Personal information
- Born: August 8, 1988 (age 38) Vilnius, Lithuanian SSR, Soviet Union
- Listed height: 6 ft 7 in (2.01 m)
- Listed weight: 203 lb (92 kg)

Career information
- High school: The Rock School (Gainesville, Florida)
- College: Youngstown State (2007–2011)
- NBA draft: 2011: undrafted
- Playing career: 2011–present

Career history
- 2011–2012: Nevėžis Kedainiai
- 2012–2015: Šiauliai
- 2015–2016: Vytautas Prienai-Birštonas
- 2016–2017: Juventus Utena
- 2017: Beirut First Sport
- 2017–2018: Neptūnas Klaipėda
- 2018–2019: Pieno Žvaigždės
- 2019–2022: Juventus Utena
- 2022–2023: CBet Jonava
- 2023–2025: Sūduva-Mantinga
- 2025-present: BC Omega-Tauras-LSU

Career highlights
- Lithuanian League MVP (2016); Lithuanian League steals leader (2016)

Vytautas Šulskis (born August 8, 1988) is a Lithuanian professional basketball player.

== High school ==
Born in Vilnius, Šulskis attended The Rock of Gainesville High School in Gainesville, Florida, where he played soccer and basketball. During his high school off-season Šulskis played AAU basketball for Florida Elite out of Tampa, Florida. Šulskis was teammates with a number of highly regarded basketball players including Larry Sanders, Justin Morin, and Dominque Jones while playing AAU for the Elite.

== College career ==
After graduation from high school, Šulskis went on to play for the Youngstown State University Penguins of NCAA. While playing for Penguins, Šulskis scored more than 1,000 career points and starred in 120 consecutive games. He averaged 13.1 points per game, 5.2 rebounds per game and 2 assists per game his senior year.

== Professional career ==
In August 2011, he signed a one-year contract with BC Žalgiris of Lithuania. However, he ended up not playing there and moving to BC Nevėžis. In 2012, Šulskis signed with BC Šiauliai. From 2015 he is playing for Vytautas Prienai-Birštonas. In the 2015–16 season, Šulskis was named the Most Valuable Player of the LKL.

In December 2017, Šulskis returned to Lithuania and signed with BC Neptūnas.
