= Gytis Masiulis =

Lithuanian basketball player

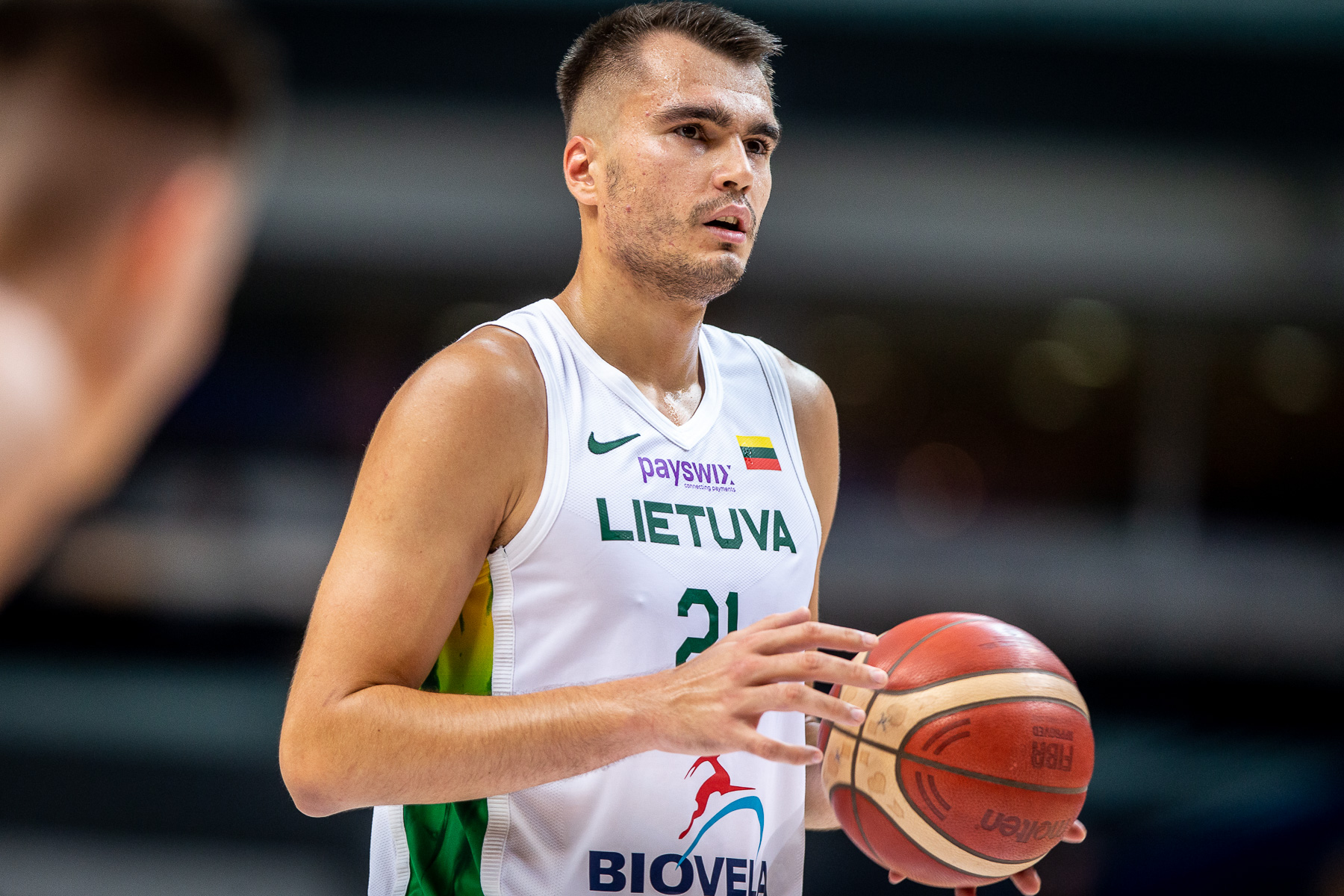
- Masiulis with Lithuania national team in 2022

No. 21 – Rytas Vilnius
- Position: Power forward
- League: LKL; BCL

Personal information
- Born: 10 April 1998 (age 28) Kaunas, Lithuania
- Listed height: 2.07 m (6 ft 9 in)
- Listed weight: 99 kg (218 lb)

Career information
- NBA draft: 2020: undrafted
- Playing career: 2014–present

Career history
- 2014–2020: Žalgiris Kaunas
- 2014–2018: → Žalgiris-2 Kaunas
- 2018–2020: → Neptūnas Klaipėda
- 2020: → Fraport Skyliners
- 2020–2021: Lietkabelis Panevežys
- 2021–2022: Bilbao Basket
- 2022–present: Rytas Vilnius

Career highlights
- FIBA Champions League champion (2026); All-LKL Team (2021); LKL Rising Star (2019); 2× King Mindaugas Cup winner (2017, 2018); 2× Lithuanian League champion (2017, 2024)

Gytis Masiulis (born 10 April 1998) is a Lithuanian professional basketball player for Rytas Vilnius of the Lithuanian Basketball League (LKL) and the Basketball Champions League (BCL).

== Professional career ==
Masiulis started his professional career when he signed with BC Žalgiris-2 in summer 2014. He debuted for the senior team of Žalgiris Kaunas on 22 January 2017 against Nevėžis Kėdainiai. In June 2017, he participated in adidas Eurocamp in Treviso, and led Europe to an 82–62 victory over the United States, scoring 16 points and grabbing 4 rebounds. In July 2018, Masiulis was loaned to Neptūnas Klaipėda. In the following year, he was named LKL Best Young Player as the top under-21 player in the league.

On 28 May 2020, Masiulis was loaned to Fraport Skyliners of the Basketball Bundesliga.

On July 7, 2021, he signed with Bilbao Basket of the Liga ACB.

On July 2, 2022, Masiulis signed with Rytas Vilnius of the LKL and the Basketball Champions League.

== National team career ==
Gytis Masiulis made his youth debut for Lithuania at the 2014 FIBA Europe Under-16 Championship in Latvia. He won a bronze medal with Lithuania in the 2015 FIBA Europe Under-18 Championship. One year later, he won silver medal at the 2016 FIBA Europe Under-18 Championship in Turkey. In 2017, Masiulis represented Lithuania at the 2017 FIBA Under-19 Basketball World Cup.

== Personal life ==
Gytis is the son of former Lithuanian national basketball team member Tomas Masiulis, who won a bronze medal at the 2000 Summer Olympics in Sydney, and previously had success with Žalgiris Kaunas and Prokom Trefl Sopot in the EuroLeague.
