= Martynas Echodas =

Lithuanian basketball player

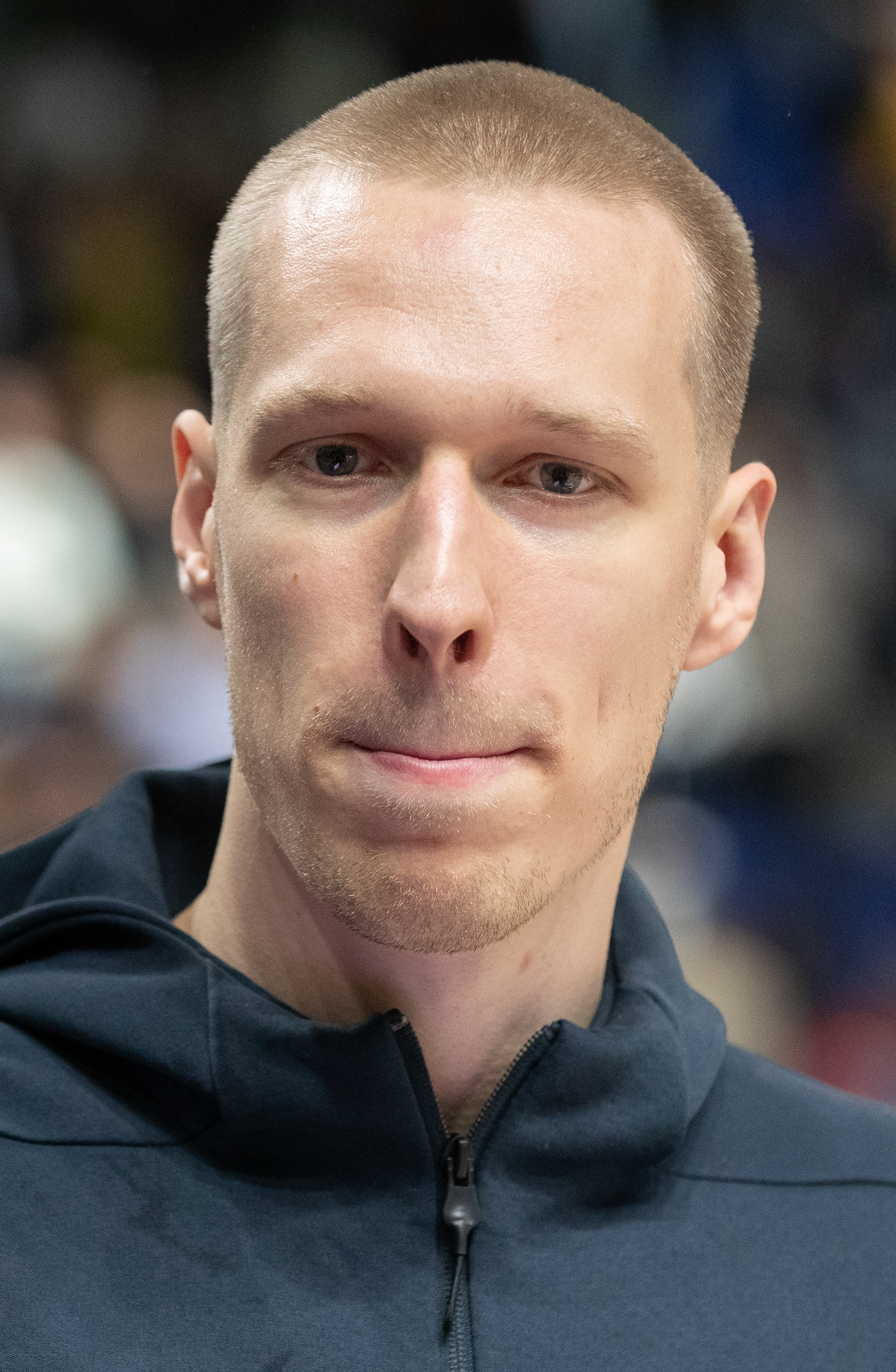
- Echodas with ALBA Berlin in 2025

No. 14 – Neptūnas Klaipėda
- Position: Center
- League: LKL; EuroCup

Personal information
- Born: 7 July 1997 (age 29) Kaunas, Lithuania
- Listed height: 2.06 m (6 ft 9 in)
- Listed weight: 110 kg (243 lb)

Career information
- Playing career: 2016–present

Career history
- 2013–2017: Žalgiris Kaunas
- 2013–2016: →Žalgiris-2 Kaunas
- 2016–2017: →Šiauliai
- 2017–2021: Lietuvos rytas Vilnius / Rytas Vilnius
- 2021–2022: Reyer Venezia
- 2022–2024: Rytas Vilnius
- 2024–2025: Manisa
- 2025–2026: Alba Berlin
- 2026: Rytas Vilnius
- 2026–present: Neptūnas Klaipėda

Career highlights
- FIBA Champions League champion (2026); EuroCup Rising Star (2019); King Mindaugas Cup winner (2019); LKL Best Young Player (2017); All-LKL Team (2023); Lithuanian League champion (2024)
Medals
Men's basketball
Representing Lithuania
FIBA European U-20 Championship
Silver medal – second place	2016 Finland	Team
FIBA European U-18 Championship
Bronze medal – third place	2015 Greece	Team

Martynas Echodas (born 7 July 1997) is a Lithuanian professional basketball player for Neptūnas Klaipėda of the Lithuanian Basketball League (LKL) and the EuroCup.

== Professional career ==
Echodas was born in Kaunas, Lithuania. A product of Žalgiris' youth system, Echodas spent his first three seasons playing for Žalgiris-2 Kaunas of National Basketball League (NKL). On 1 September 2016 Echodas was loaned to BC Šiauliai of the LKL. On November 23, he recorded a career-high 30 points, 14 rebounds, and 37 efficiency points in a FIBA Europe Cup match against Pardubice.

In August 2017, Echodas signed a three-year contract with Rytas Vilnius. In his second year with Rytas, Echodas won the EuroCup's Rising Star Award for the 2018–19 season. During 18 games played, he averaged 9.6 points, 5.1 rebounds and 11.7 point PIR rating, while shooting 62.6% from the field. He re-signed with the team on 23 July 2020.

On 29 June 2021 Echodas signed with Reyer Venezia of the Italian Lega Basket Serie A (LBA).

On 1 July 2022 Echodas returned to Rytas Vilnius, signing a contract until the end of the 2023–2024 season.

On 29 July 2024 he signed with Manisa Basket of the Basketbol Süper Ligi (BSL).

On August 30, 2025, Echodas signed with Alba Berlin of the Basketball Bundesliga.

On March 24, 2026, Echodas once again signed contract with Rytas Vilnius of the Lithuanian Basketball League (LKL).

On July 21, 2026, he signed with Neptūnas Klaipėda of the Lithuanian Basketball League (LKL) and the EuroCup.

== National team career ==
Echodas was part of the U-16 and U-18 Lithuanian youth teams that participated in the 2013 FIBA Europe Under-16 Championship and the 2015 FIBA Europe Under-18 Championship. In the latter tournament, he averaged 9.0 points, 6.1 rebounds and 1.1 blocks per game in just 18.2 minutes per game. On 23 February 2018 Echodas debuted as a member of the Lithuania men's national basketball team by scoring 5 points and grabbing 6 rebounds, and helped to defeat the Hungary national basketball team 80–75 during the 2019 FIBA Basketball World Cup qualification.

== Personal life ==
Echodas is of Jewish descent (through his maternal grandfather).
