= Šiauliai Arena =

Arena in Šiauliai, Lithuania

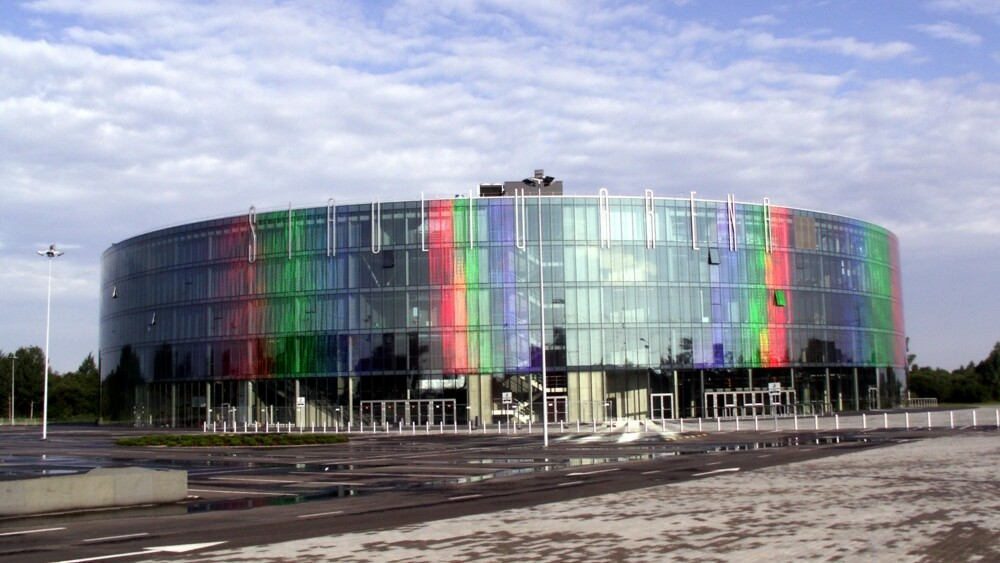
- Šiaulių Arena in 2007
- Interactive map of Šiauliai Arena
- Address: J. Jablonskio g. 16
- Location: Šiauliai, Lithuania
- Coordinates: 55°55′12″N 23°16′58″E
- Capacity: Basketball 5,500; Concerts 7,300

Construction
- Groundbreaking: 2006
- Opened: 25 July 2007
- Cost: € 21.87 million
- Architects: Eugenijus Miliūnas & Dviejų grupė
- General contractor: PST

Tenant
- BC Šiauliai

Website
- siauliuarena.lt

Šiauliai Arena is the largest arena in Šiauliai, Lithuania. It generally hosts basketball games as well as concerts. The basketball club BC Šiauliai, which currently competes in the domestic LKL and ULEB Cup, uses the facility for all of its European and LKL home fixtures. It opened on 25 July 2007. The arena had hosted the Eurobasket 2011 Group B matches from 31 August 2011 to 5 September 2011.

In 2013, Šiauliai Arena hosted Davis Cup matches.

== Building ==
Holographic glass shining in the sun on the outside throughout four out of five floors makes the arena stand out from the other buildings. The Šiauliai Arena is capable of accommodating 7,400 people during concerts, while it features 5,700 seats for basketball games. The arena was built by Panevėžio statybos trestas from Panevėžys in 18 months. The total cost exceeded 75 million Litas (27 million USD). The parking lot next to the arena has the capacity for 600 cars.

== Gallery ==
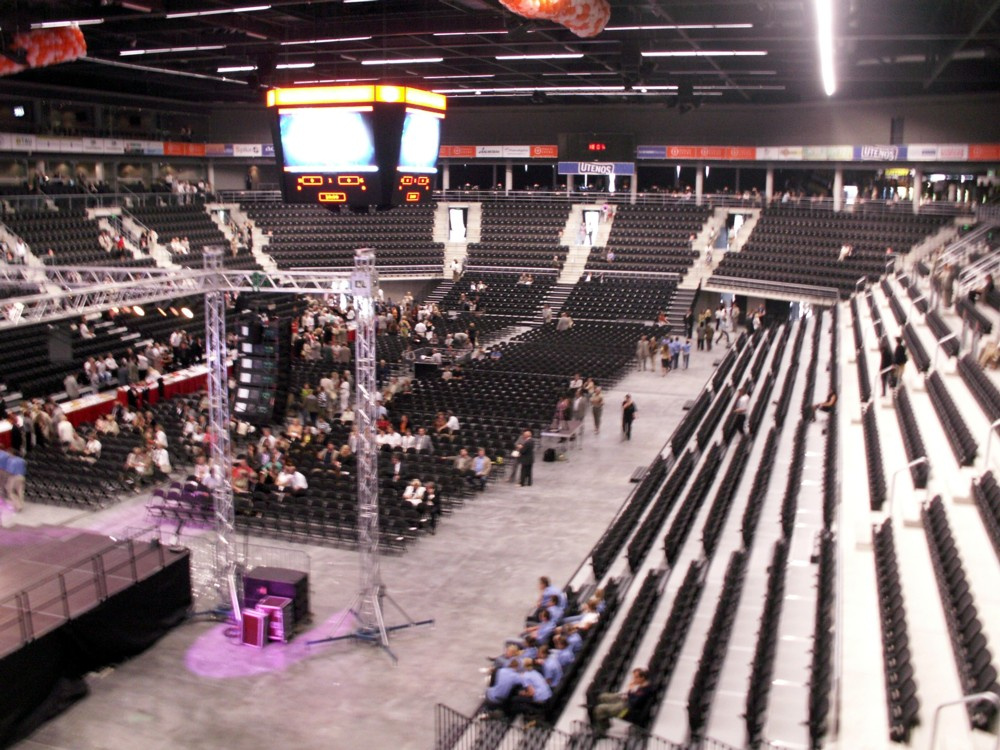
Šiauliai Arena from inside.

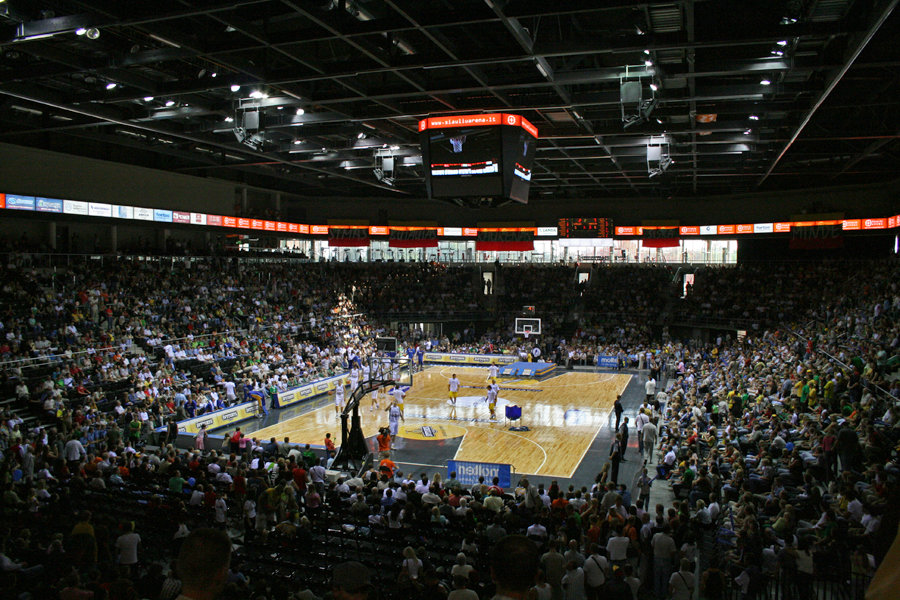
Basketball game at the arena.

== See also ==
- List of indoor arenas in Lithuania
- Šiauliai BMX Track
