= 2023–24 King Mindaugas Cup =

2023–24 Karaliaus Mindaugo taurė
Tournament details
- Country: Lithuania
- City: Kaunas
- Venue(s): Žalgiris Arena
- Dates: 10 October 2023 – 18 February 2024
- Teams: 13
- Defending champions: Žalgiris

Final positions
- Champions: Žalgiris (7th title)
- Runners-up: 7Bet–Lietkabelis
- Third place: Rytas

Awards
- MVP: (Lithuania) Laurynas Birutis

The 2023–24 King Mindaugas Cup, also known as Citadele Karaliaus Mindaugo taurė for sponsorship purposes, was the ninth edition of the Lithuanian King Mindaugas Cup. Žalgiris successfully defended the title for the 4th time in a row after defeating 7Bet–Lietkabelis in the final 86–70.

== Format ==
All 12 teams from 2023–24 LKL season and one wildcard team from 2023–24 NKL season participated in this tournament. Five teams that participated in Euroleague Basketball and FIBA tournaments, have received bye's to quarterfinals stage, while the remaining teams were drawn into two groups, with the group winners advancing straight to the Quarterfinals, while second-placed teams faced off each other for the final Quarterfinals spot.

== Group stage ==
=== Group A ===
Pos	Team	Pld	W	L	PF	PA	PD	Qualification	NEP	JUV	GAR	MAZ
1	Neptūnas	6	5	1	547	513	+34	Advance to Quarterfinals	—	92–90	84–78	109–80
2	Uniclub Casino – Juventus	6	4	2	517	463	+54	Advance to Eightfinal	92–78	—	84–61	90–91
3	Gargždai	6	2	4	478	514	−36		87–97	66–75	—	95–93
4	M Basket-Delamode	6	1	5	506	558	−52		86–87	75–86	81–91	—

Source: LKL.LT

=== Group B ===
Pos	Team	Pld	W	L	PF	PA	PD	Qualification	SIA	NEV	OLI	PZV
1	Šiauliai	6	5	1	565	506	+59	Advance to Quarterfinals	—	89–74	82–90	104–93
2	Nevėžis–Optibet	6	3	3	525	512	+13	Advance to Eightfinal	98–102	—	83–57	112–107
3	Olimpas	6	3	3	457	474	−17		75–88	77–66	—	80–71
4	Pieno žvaigždės	6	1	5	511	566	−55		76–100	80–92	84–78	—

Source: LKL.LT

== Eightfinal ==
Second ranked teams from each group faced-off each other in a home-and-away format, with the overall cumulative score determining the winner of a match. The winner earned the last quarterfinals spot.

Team 1	Agg.	Team 2	1st leg	2nd leg
Uniclub Casino – Juventus	208–203	Nevėžis–Optibet	107–90	101–113

== Quarterfinals ==
Five teams have received byes to the Quarterfinals stage due to participating in FIBA and Euroleague Basketball competitions. Those teams are:

- 7Bet–Lietkabelis
- Cbet
- Rytas
- Wolves
- Žalgiris

All qualified teams will be drawn into pairs, where they will face-off each other in a home-and-away format, with the overall cumulative score determining the winner of a match. The winners of each pair would then qualify for the Final four.

Team 1	Agg.	Team 2	1st leg	2nd leg
Žalgiris	177–158	Wolves	95–76	82–82
Rytas	202–153	Uniclub Casino – Juventus	98–86	104–67
7Bet–Lietkabelis	168–167	Neptūnas	89–91	79–76
Cbet	149–163	Šiauliai	77–80	72–83

== Final four ==
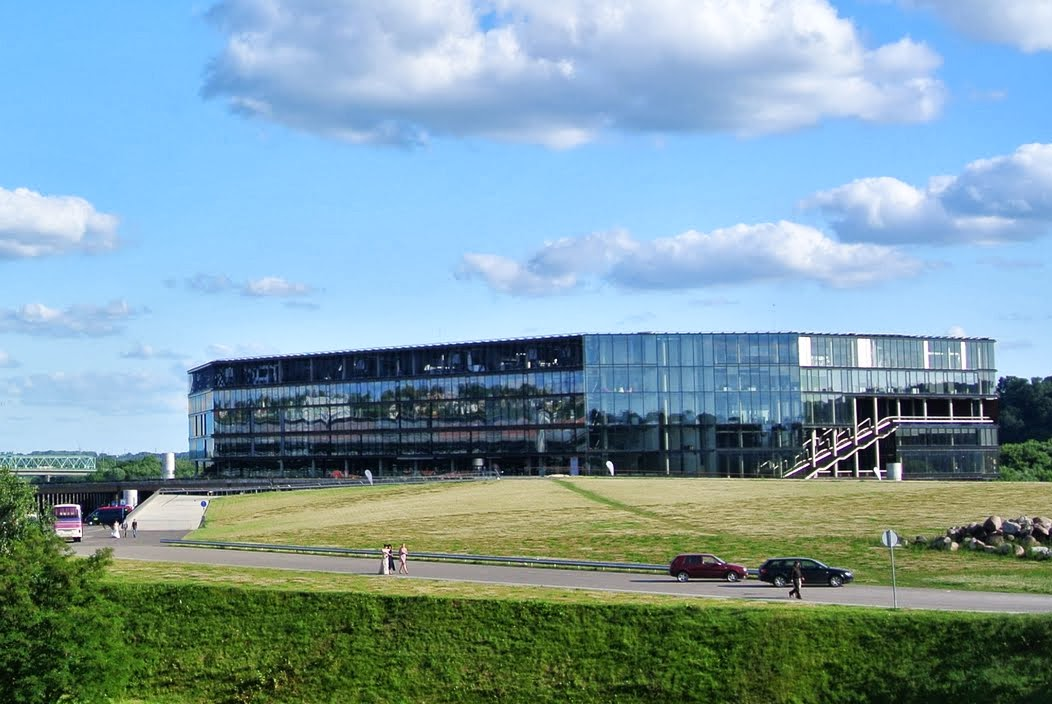
Žalgirio Arena in Kaunas, Lithuania

The final four was hosted by the Žalgiris Arena in Kaunas on 17–18 February 2024.

Semifinals; 17 February
Žalgiris	87
Šiauliai	77
Rytas	86
7Bet–Lietkabelis	94

Final; 18 February
Žalgiris	86
7Bet–Lietkabelis	70
Third place 18 February
Šiauliai	89
Rytas	94

=== Semifinals ===
17 February 2024	Žalgiris	87–77	Šiauliai	Kaunas
18:15 (EET)	Scoring by quarter: 20–25, 21–22, 26–16, 20–14
	Pts: Lekavičius 17; Rebs: Birutis 6 Asts: Evans, Lekavičius 4 PIR: Lekavičius 18	Boxscore	Pts: Romančenko 17; Rebs: Pavelka 8 Asts: Thorpe 5 PIR: Romančenko 22	Arena: Žalgiris Arena; Attendance: 5,343; Referees: Jurgis Laurinavičius, Gintaras Mačiulis, Juozas Barkauskas

Starters:			Pts	Reb	Ast
PG	2	(United States) Keenan Evans	10	3	4
SG	9	(Lithuania) Dovydas Giedraitis	9	0	2
SF	10	(Latvia) Rolands Šmits	8	2	3
PF	92	(Lithuania) Edgaras Ulanovas	8	5	1
C	45	(United States) Brady Manek	5	4	3
Reserves:					
PG	4	(Lithuania) Lukas Lekavičius	17	1	4
C	8	(Central African Republic) Kevarrius Hayes	3	0	0
C	15	(Lithuania) Laurynas Birutis	12	6	1
G	26	(United States) Edmond Sumner	2	2	1
SG	33	(Lithuania) Tomas Dimša	13	2	2
F/C	35	(Lithuania) Danielius Lavrinovičius	0	0	0
SF	51	(Lithuania) Arnas Butkevičius	0	2	2
Head coach:
(Italy) Andrea Trinchieri

Žalgiris	Šiauliai

Starters:			Pts	Reb	Ast
PG	2	(United States) L.J. Thorpe	14	2	5
SG	4	(Lithuania) Eimantas Stankevičius	2	2	1
SF	9	(Lithuania) Daniel Baslyk	5	5	0
PF	8	(United States) Ben Vander Plas	3	4	2
C	21	(Slovakia) Tomaš Pavelka	11	8	0
Reserves:					
G	3	(Lithuania) Karolis Giedraitis	4	1	1
SF	23	(Canada) Shaquille Keith	6	0	4
F/C	25	(Lithuania) Dovydas Romančenko	17	4	0
G/F	29	(Lithuania) Nojus Mineikis	11	6	2
SG	45	(Lithuania) Deividas Žukauskas	DNP		
PF	77	(Lithuania) Paulius Danusevičius	4	2	2
Head coach:
(Lithuania) Žydrūnas Urbonas

17 February 2024	Rytas	86–94	7Bet–Lietkabelis	Kaunas
15:30 (EET)	Scoring by quarter: 23―15, 18―16, 17―27, 28―36
	Pts: Foster 23; Rebs: Echodas 13; Asts: Velička 4 PIR: Echodas 24	Boxscore	Pts: Gagić 31; Rebs: Gagić 10; Asts: Orelik 4 PIR: Gagić 44	Arena: Žalgiris Arena; Attendance: 4,508; Referees: Gytis Vilius, Saulius Račys, Gvidas Gedvilas

Starters:			Pts	Reb	Ast
PG	17	(United States) Marcus Foster	23	0	2
SG	8	(United States) R. J. Cole	4	1	3
SF	4	(United States) Justin Gorham	4	1	0
PF	7	(Lithuania) Gytis Radzevičius	7	5	2
C	12	(United States) Javin DeLaurier	5	3	0
Reserves:					
PG	1	(Lithuania) Arnas Velička	7	2	5
G	2	(Lithuania) Margiris Normantas	14	3	3
G/F	10	(Lithuania) Lukas Uleckas	0	0	0
C	14	(Lithuania) Martynas Echodas	12	13	3
PF	21	(Lithuania) Gytis Masiulis	10	5	1
PG	22	(Lithuania) Gantas Križanauskas	DNP		
F/C	41	(Lithuania) Oskaras Pleikys	DNP		
Head coach:
(Lithuania) Giedrius Žibėnas

Rytas	7Bet–Lietkabelis

Starters:			Pts	Reb	Ast
PG	7	(United States) Diante Baldwin	4	5	2
SG	91	(Lithuania) Deividas Sirvydis	18	8	1
SF	10	(Lithuania) Vytenis Lipkevičius	4	4	1
PF	17	(Lithuania) Gediminas Orelik	13	4	4
C	41	(Serbia) Đorđe Gagić	31	10	1
Reserves:					
PG	2	(Lithuania) Dovis Bičkauskis	11	2	3
G/F	3	(Lithuania) Liutauras Lelevičius	DNP		
SG	9	(Lithuania) Nikas Stuknys	DNP		
F	11	(Lithuania) Džiugas Slavinskas	0	1	1
F/C	12	(Lithuania) Gabrielius Maldūnas	7	4	1
G/F	13	(Lithuania) Martynas Varnas	4	1	3
PG	66	(Lithuania) Paulius Valinskas	2	1	0
Head coach:
(Serbia) Nenad Čanak (basketball)

=== Third place ===
18 February 2024	Šiauliai	89–94	Rytas	Kaunas
15:45 (EET)	Scoring by quarter: 21―29, 23―23, 21―22, 24―20
	Pts: Keith 25; Rebs: Pavelka 6 Asts: Thorpe 3 PIR: Keith 21	Boxscore	Pts: Normantas 22; Rebs: Cole, Radzevičius 6 Asts: Radzevičius 6 PIR: Radzevičius 26	Arena: Žalgiris Arena; Attendance: 9,933; Referees: Saulius Račys, Gintaras Mačiulis, Aurimas Borusas

Starters:			Pts	Reb	Ast
PG	2	(United States) L.J. Thorpe	20	4	3
SG	4	(Lithuania) Eimantas Stankevičius	13	4	1
SF	8	(Lithuania) Ben Vander Plas	0	1	2
PF	9	(United States) Daniel Baslyk	4	2	1
C	21	(Slovakia) Tomaš Pavelka	6	6	1
Reserves:					
G	3	(Lithuania) Karolis Giedraitis	3	0	1
SF	23	(Canada) Shaquille Keith	25	4	0
F/C	25	(Lithuania) Dovydas Romančenko	6	3	1
G/F	29	(Lithuania) Nojus Mineikis	10	2	1
SG	45	(Lithuania) Deividas Žukauskas	DNP		
PF	77	(Lithuania) Paulius Danusevičius	2	5	0
Head coach:
(Lithuania) Žydrūnas Urbonas

Šiauliai	Rytas

Starters:			Pts	Reb	Ast
PG	17	(United States) Marcus Foster (basketball)	19	0	0
SG	8	(United States) R. J. Cole	2	6	5
SF	7	(United States) Gytis Radzevičius	15	6	6
PF	4	(Lithuania) Justin Gorham	15	5	1
C	12	(United States) Javin DeLaurier	4	1	3
Reserves:					
G	2	(Lithuania) Margiris Normantas	22	0	1
G/F	10	(Lithuania) Lukas Uleckas	4	2	1
C	14	(Lithuania) Martynas Echodas	4	5	3
PF	21	(Lithuania) Gytis Masiulis	4	3	1
PG	22	(Lithuania) Gantas Križanauskas	DNP		
F/C	41	(Lithuania) Oskaras Pleikys	5	2	2
Head coach:
(Lithuania) Giedrius Žibėnas

=== Final ===
18 February 2024	Žalgiris	86–70	7Bet–Lietkabelis	Kaunas
19:15 (EET)	Scoring by quarter: 23―19, 29―19, 18―18, 16―14
	Pts: Evans 16; Rebs: Hayes 6 Asts: Lekavičius 5 PIR: Evans 21	Boxscore	Pts: Sirvydis 15; Rebs: Lipkevičius 7 Asts: Orelik 8 PIR: Orelik 18	Arena: Žalgiris Arena; Attendance: 12,767; Referees: Gytis Vilius, Jurgis Laurinavičius, Gvidas Gedvilas

2023–24 King Mindaugas Cup champions
Žalgiris
(7th title)

== Three-Point contest ==
Contestants
Pos.	Player	Team	Height (m)	Weight (kg)	First round	Second round	Final round
G	(United States) Sean McNeil^{C}	Nevėžis–Optibet	1.90	95	19	19	16
G/F	(Latvia) Artis Ate	Pieno žvaigždės	1.93	88	18	–	–
G	(Lithuania) Eimantas Stankevičius	Šiauliai	1.92	90	18	–	–
G	(Puerto Rico) Ivan Gandia-Rosa	CBet	1.85	87	18	–	–
G	(Lithuania) Martynas Gecevičius	M Basket–Delamode	1.93	95	22	18	–
G	(Lithuania) Ignas Sargiūnas	Neptūnas	1.96	86	13	–	–
G	(Lithuania) Liutauras Lelevičius	7Bet–Lietkabelis	2.01	90	18	–	–
G	(Lithuania) Marius Valinskas	Uniclub Casino – Juventus	1.87	81	11	–	–
G	(United States) Rasheed Sulaimon^{C}	Wolves	1.94	93	19	20	16
G/F	(Lithuania) Lukas Uleckas^{REP}	Rytas	1.99	93	12	–	–
F/C	(Lithuania) Danielius Lavrinovičius	Žalgiris	2.06	105	22	17	–
G	(Lithuania) Edvinas Paulauskas	—	1.90	80	15	–	–
G	(United States) Brandon Tabb	Pieno žvaigždės	1.93	89	14	–	–

^REP Lukas Uleckas was selected as Arnas Velička replacement.
^C After the contest, it was noted that Rasheed Sulaimon scored only 16 points instead of 18 points and the series should have been tied. The LKL presented a prize of the same value to Sean McNeil and the contest title is shared between these two players.
