= 2021–22 King Mindaugas Cup =

2021–22 Karaliaus Mindaugo taurė
Tournament details
- Country: Lithuania
- City: Vilnius
- Venue: Avia Solutions Group Arena
- Dates: 28 September 2021 – 20 February 2022
- Teams: 11
- Defending champions: Žalgiris

Final positions
- Champions: Žalgiris (5th title)
- Runners-up: Lietkabelis
- Third place: Rytas

Awards
- MVP: (France) Joffrey Lauvergne

The 2021–22 King Mindaugas Cup, also known as Citadele Karaliaus Mindaugo taurė for sponsorship purposes, was the seventh edition of the Lithuanian King Mindaugas Cup. Žalgiris successfully defended the title for the 2nd time in a row after defeating Lietkabelis in the final 91–67.

== Format ==
All 11 teams from 2021–22 LKL season participated in this tournament. Top three teams from 2020–21 LKL season have received bye's to quarterfinals stage, while 4-10 ranked teams were drawn into two groups, with the group winners and runners-up advancing straight to the Quarterfinals, while third-placed teams faced off each other for the final Quarterfinals spot.

== Group stage ==
=== Group A ===
Pos	Team	Pld	W	L	PF	PA	PD	Qualification	NEP	JSK	PRI	NEV
1	Neptūnas	6	5	1	523	476	+47	Advance to Quarterfinals	—	89–74	76–79	97–95
2	Cbet Jonava	6	3	3	471	487	−16	Advance to Quarterfinals	86–92	—	78–74	83–70
3	Labas Gas	6	3	3	476	463	+13	Advance to Eightfinal	70–84	81–85	—	89–59
4	Nevėžis–Optibet	6	1	5	458	502	−44		72–85	81–65	81–83	—

Source: LKL.LT
Legend: Blue = home team win; Red = away team win.

=== Group B ===
Pos	Team	Pld	W	L	PF	PA	PD	Qualification	JUV	DZU	SIA	PZV
1	Uniclub Casino – Juventus	6	6	0	527	496	+31	Advance to Quarterfinals	—	75–68	98–91	90–88
2	Dzūkija	6	3	3	477	509	−32	Advance to Quarterfinals	80–81	—	96–91	65–64
3	Šiauliai	6	2	4	549	563	−14	Advance to Eightfinal	94–98	101–111	—	95–90
4	Pieno žvaigždės	6	1	5	484	469	+15		75–85	97–57	70–77	—

Source: LKL.LT
Legend: Blue = home team win; Red = away team win.

=== Eightfinal ===
Third ranked teams from each group faced-off each other in a home-and-away format, with the overall cumulative score determining the winner of a match. The winner earned the last quarterfinals spot.

Team 1	Agg.	Team 2	1st leg	2nd leg
Labas Gas	156–184	Šiauliai–7bet	100–94	56–90

== Quarterfinals ==
Top three teams from 2020–21 LKL season have received bye's to quarterfinals stage. Those teams are:

- Žalgiris
- Rytas
- Lietkabelis

All qualified teams will be drawn into pairs, where they will face-off each other in a home-and-away format, with the overall cumulative score determining the winner of a match. The winners of each pair would then qualify for the Final four.

Team 1	Agg.	Team 2	1st leg	2nd leg
Žalgiris	154–134	Cbet	86–75	68–59
Uniclub Casino – Juventus	169–178	Šiauliai–7bet	83–86	86–92
Rytas	189–161	Dzūkija	95–81	94–80
Lietkabelis	153–149	Neptūnas	73–69	80–80

== Final four ==
Avia Solutions Group Arena in Vilnius, Lithuania

The final four was hosted by the Avia Solutions Group Arena in Vilnius on 19–20 February 2022.

Semifinals; 19 February
Žalgiris	80
Šiauliai–7bet	68
Rytas	80
Lietkabelis	82

Final; 20 February
Žalgiris	91
Lietkabelis	66
Third place 20 February
Šiauliai–7bet	71
Rytas	76

=== Semifinals ===
19 February 2022	Žalgiris	80–68	Šiauliai–7bet	Vilnius
17:30 (EET)	Scoring by quarter: 27–17, 18–21, 16–11, 19–19
	Pts: Lauvergne 15; Rebs: Lauvergne, Nebo 8 Asts: Kalnietis 6 PIR: Lauvergne 24	Boxscore	Pts: Varnas 12; Rebs: Sabeckis 6 Asts: Elmore 10; PIR: Elmore 18	Arena: Avia Solutions Group Arena; Attendance: 4,600; Referees: Jurgis Laurinavičius, Gvidas Gedvilas

19 February 2022	Rytas	80–82	Lietkabelis	Vilnius
20:15 (EET)	Scoring by quarter: 20―15, 23―24, 17―24, 20―19
	Pts: Buva 21; Rebs: Butkevičius, Radzevičius 8 Asts: Kariniauskas 9 PIR: Butkevičius 22	Boxscore	Pts: Lipkevičius 16; Rebs: Maldūnas 9 Asts: Žemaitis 4 PIR: Lipkevičius 23	Arena: Avia Solutions Group Arena; Attendance: 5,500; Referees: Gytis Vilius, Tomas Jasevičius

=== Third place ===
20 February 2022	Šiauliai–7bet	71–76	Rytas	Vilnius
17:45 (EET)	Scoring by quarter: 16―23, 18―14, 19―13, 18―26
	Pts: Elmore 21; Rebs: Armwood 8 Asts: Elmore 9 PIR: Elmore 22	Boxscore	Pts: Girdžiūnas 23; Rebs: Radzevičius, Williams 10; Asts: Girdžiūnas 4 PIR: Girdžiūnas 24	Arena: Avia Solutions Group Arena; Attendance: 6,221; Referees: Gvidas Gedvilas

=== Final ===
20 February 2022	Žalgiris	91–66	Lietkabelis	Vilnius
21:15 (EET)	Scoring by quarter: 22―12, 24―15, 22―16, 23―23
	Pts: Nebo 25; Rebs: Lauvergne 8 Asts: Lekavičius 6 PIR: Nebo 28	Boxscore	Pts: Lipkevičius 14; Rebs: Maldūnas 6 Asts: Kalaitzakis 6 PIR: Lipkevičius 18	Arena: Avia Solutions Group Arena; Attendance: 8,378

2021–22 King Mindaugas Cup champions
Žalgiris
(5th title)
