= Tomas Masiulis =

Lithuanian professional basketball player and coach

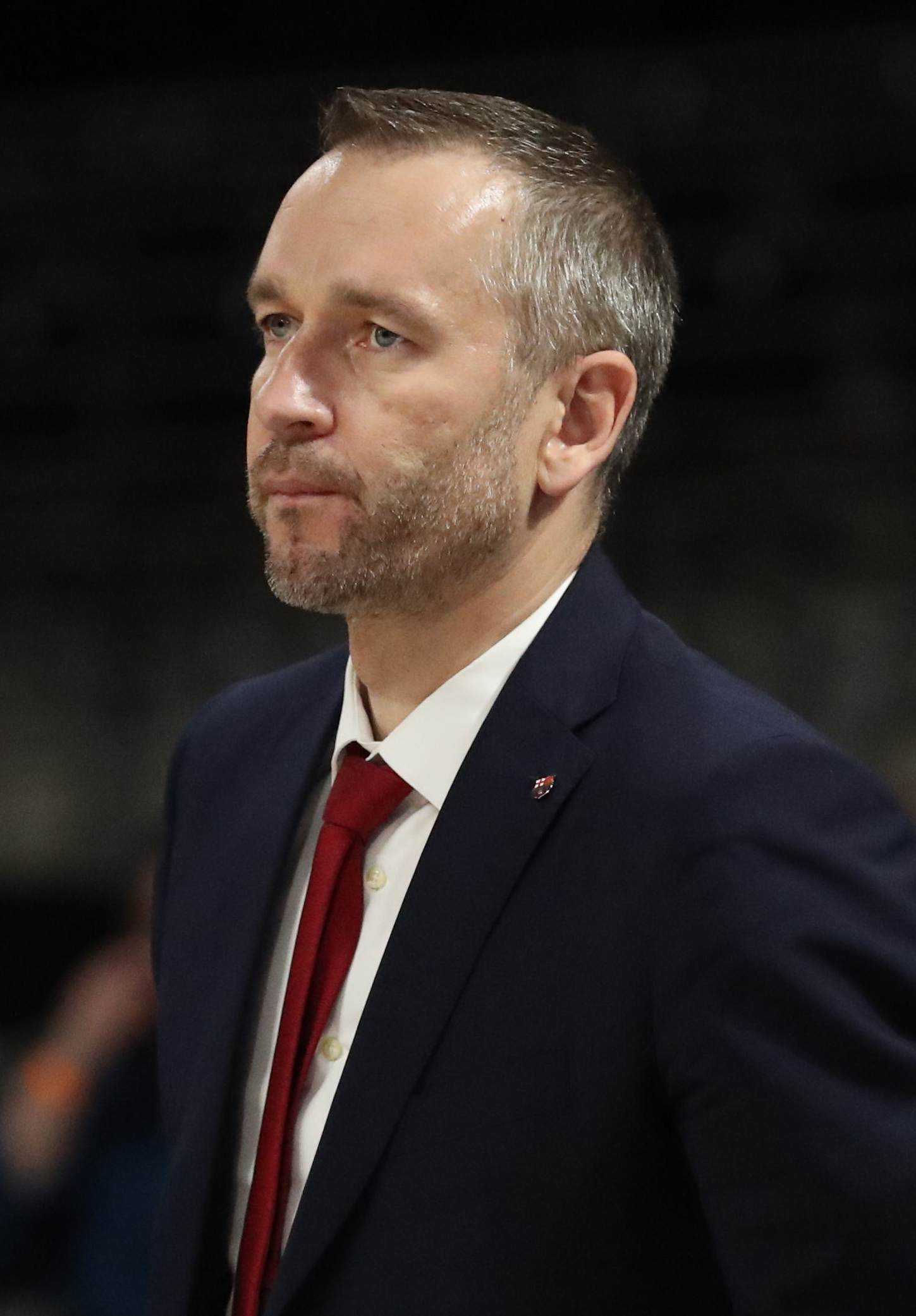

Žalgiris Kaunas
- Title: Head coach
- League: LKL; EuroLeague

Personal information
- Born: September 19, 1975 (age 51) Kaunas, Lithuanian SSR, Soviet Union
- Listed height: 6 ft 8.75 in (2.05 m)
- Listed weight: 230 lb (104 kg)

Career information
- College: Kaunas University of Technology
- Playing career: 1994–2009
- Position: Power forward
- Coaching career: 2009–present

Career history

Playing
- 1994–1995: Statyba Jonava
- 1995–2002: Žalgiris Kaunas
- 2002: Montepaschi Siena
- 2002–2008: Prokom Trefl Sopot
- 2008: Žalgiris Kaunas
- 2008–2009: Aisčiai Kaunas

Coaching
- 2009–2010: Žalgiris U16
- 2010–2011: Aisčiai Kaunas (assistant)
- 2011–2018: Žalgiris-2
- 2013: Lithuania Under-19
- 2014–2016: Lithuania Under-20
- 2018–2020: Žalgiris Kaunas (assistant)
- 2020–2023: FC Barcelona (assistant)
- 2023–2025: Fenerbahçe Beko (assistant)
- 2025–present: Žalgiris Kaunas

Career highlights
- As a player: EuroLeague champion (1999); 2× FIBA Saporta Cup champion (1998, 2002); 5× Lithuanian League champion (1996–1999, 2001); 5× Polish League champion (2004–2008); Polish League Finals MVP (2006); 2× Polish League Best Defender (2004, 2006); North European League champion (1999); As assistant coach: European Basketball Triple Crown (2025); EuroLeague champion (2025); 2× Turkish League champion (2024, 2025); 2× Turkish Cup winner (2024, 2025); 2× Liga ACB champion (2021, 2023); 2× Spanish Cup winner (2021, 2022); Catalan League champion (2022); 2× Lithuanian LKL champion (2019, 2020); King Mindaugas Cup winner (2020); As head coach: LKL champion (2026); King Mindaugas Cup winner (2026); LKL Coach of the Year (2026)
Medals
Representing Lithuania
Men's basketball
Olympics
| Bronze medal – third place | 2000 Sydney |
Men's basketball
Head Coach for Lithuania
FIBA Europe U20 Championship
| Silver medal – second place | 2016 Finland | Under-20 |
FIBA World Under-19 Championship
| Bronze medal – third place | 2013 Czech Republic | Under-19 |

Tomas Masiulis (born September 19, 1975) is a Lithuanian professional basketball coach and former player who is current the head coach for Žalgiris Kaunas of the Lithuanian Basketball League (LKL) and the EuroLeague. During his playing career, at a height of 2.05 m (6'8 3/4") tall, he played at the power forward position.

== Professional playing career ==
Masiulis started his club playing career with Statyba Jonava, in the Lithuanian Second Division (LKAL). After a year, he moved to Žalgiris Kaunas, of the Lithuanian First Division (LKL), where he played until mid-2002 and won five Lithuanian League titles, North European Basketball League and EuroLeague in 1999. Later, he moved to the Italian League club Montepaschi Siena.

After finishing the season with that club, he moved to the Polish League club Asseco Prokom Gdynia. At the end of the 2007–2008 season, after Asseco Prokom Gdynia changed owners, Masiulis was released, he seriously considered retiring. However, after some of Žalgiris Kaunas' players sustained injuries, Masiulis joined Žalgiris Kaunas again. His contract with Žalgiris Kaunas, which ended on December 16, 2008, was not extended, so Masiulis then signed a contract with the Aisčiai Kaunas, on December 17, 2008. After the New Year, he extended the contract through the end of the season.

== National team playing career ==
As a member of the senior Lithuania men's national basketball team, Masiulis played at the 1998 FIBA World Championship, and the 1999 EuroBasket. He was also a member of the Lithuanian team that won the bronze medal at the 2000 Summer Olympic Games.

== Coaching career ==
=== Early coaching career ===
In October 2009, Masiulis became a coach at the basketball school of Žalgiris-2, coaching the Under-14 team. In January 2010, he became an assistant coach with Aisčiai Kaunas. He was next the head coach of Žalgiris-2's main team, which is the reserve team of Žalgiris Kaunas. He led the team to the Lithuanian Second Division (NKL) Finals in 2016 and 2018.

=== Žalgiris Kaunas (2018–2020) ===
In July 2018, Masiulis joined the Lithuanian powerhouse Žalgiris Kaunas coaching staff as an assistant coach of Šarūnas Jasikevičius and this way replaced Darius Songaila, who joined the San Antonio Spurs. This was the beginning of a successful long-term collaboration of two childhood friends in the same teams coaching staff. Being a part of the Žalgiris Kaunas coaching staff, Masiulis became twice the Lithuanian League champion in the 2018–19 LKL season, and 2019–20 LKL season, as well as won the 2019–20 King Mindaugas Cup.

=== FC Barcelona (2020–2023) ===
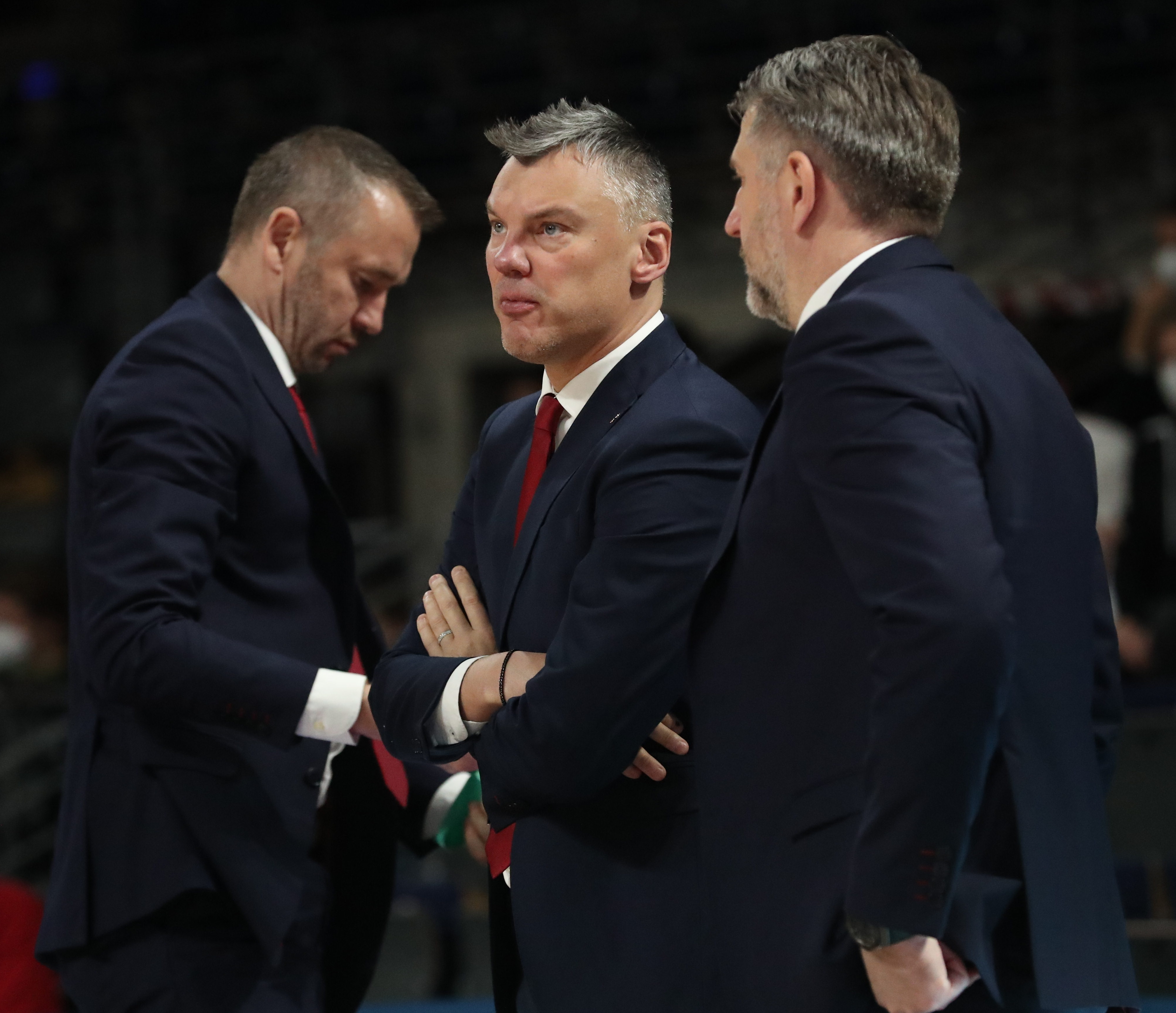
Masiulis with head coach Šarūnas Jasikevičius and another assistant coach Darius Maskoliūnas coaching FC Barcelona in 2022

In July 2020, Jasikevičius became the head coach of the FC Barcelona Bàsquet and soon Masiulis joined him as an assistant coach. The FC Barcelona Bàsquet, coached by Lithuanian coaching staff of Jasikevičius, Masiulis and Darius Maskoliūnas, in the 2020–21 ACB season reclaimed the Spanish League champions title for the first time since 2014. Later the FC Barcelona Bàsquet also became the Spanish League champions in the 2022–23 ACB season. Nevertheless, while Masiulis was a part of the FC Barcelona Bàsquet coaching staff, the FC Barcelona Bàsquet failed to win the top-tier European basketball league EuroLeague as in the 2021 EuroLeague Final Four they finished second, in the 2022 EuroLeague Final Four finished third, and in the 2023 EuroLeague Final Four finished fourth. Following the 2022–2023 season, head coach Jasikevičius left the FC Barcelona Bàsquet and Masiulis did so as well.

=== Fenerbahçe Istanbul (2023–2025) ===
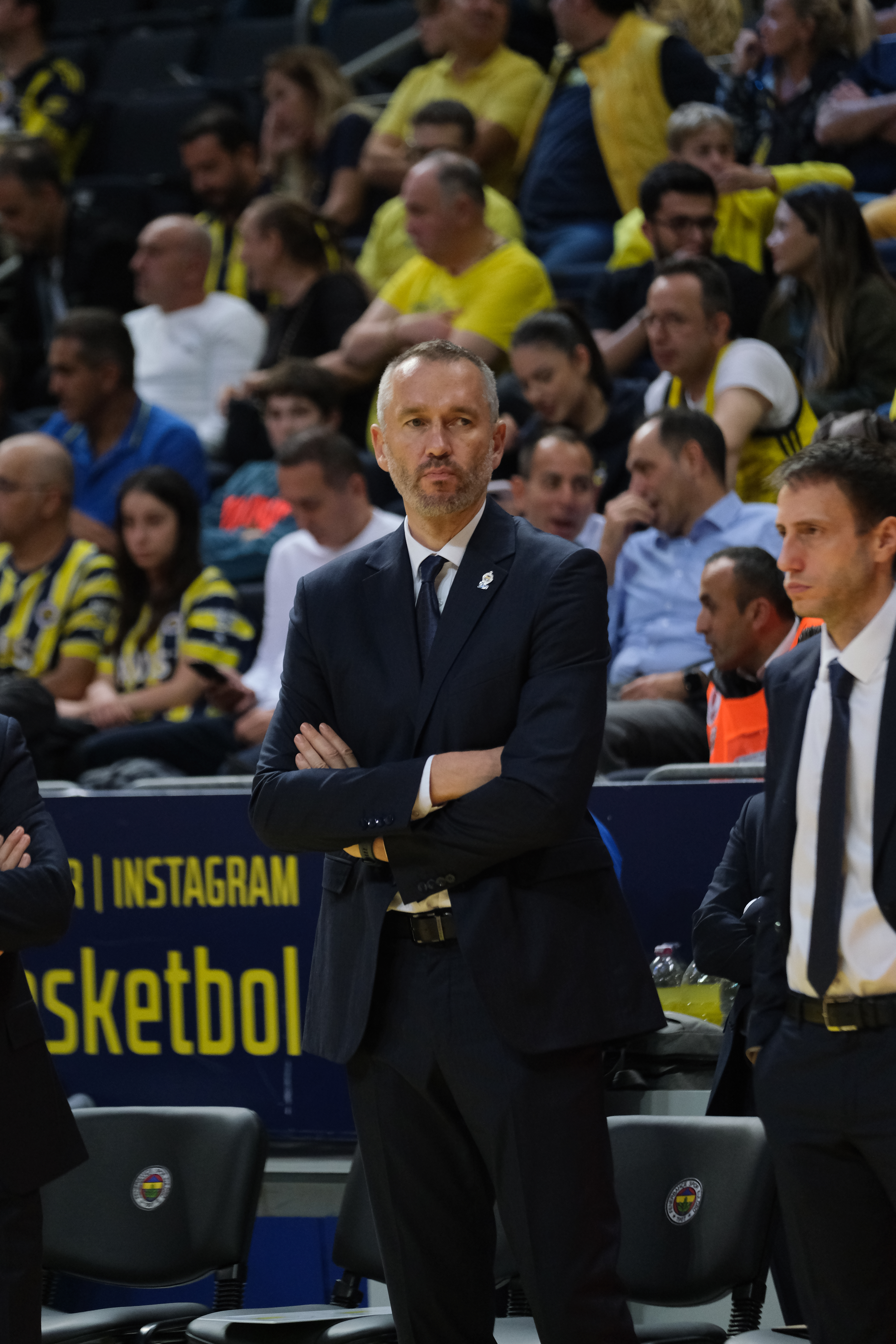
Masiulis coaching Fenerbahçe in 2024

In December 2023, Jasikevičius became a head coach of the Turkish powerhouse Fenerbahçe Istanbul and Masiulis also signed in December 2023 with the Fenerbahçe Istanbul, becoming once again an assistant coach of Jasikevičius. In the first season in the Fenerbahçe Istanbul's coaching staff Masiulis won the 2023–24 Turkish League, 2024 Turkish Basketball Cup, and finished fourth in the 2024 EuroLeague Final Four.

In the second season in the Fenerbahçe Istanbul's coaching staff Masiulis contributed to Fenerbahçe Istanbul's European Basketball Triple Crown (won the Turkish League, Turkish Cup, and EuroLeague in the 2025 EuroLeague Final Four).

=== Žalgiris Kaunas (2025–present) ===
In June 2025, Masiulis once again returned to the Žalgiris Kaunas and became its head coach. In his debut season as head coach of the Žalgiris Kaunas he won the 2025–26 King Mindaugas Cup. Moreover, Žalgiris Kaunas finished fifth in the 2025–26 EuroLeague regular season, while Masiulis was a runner-up for the 2026 EuroLeague Coach of the Year award. In the 2026 EuroLeague Playoffs Masiulis' coached Žalgiris Kaunas faced off his former team Fenerbahçe Istanbul, coached by Jasikevičius, and Žalgiris Kaunas lost the series 1–3.

== Career statistics ==
Legend
| GP | Games played | GS | Games started | MPG | Minutes per game |
| FG% | Field-goal percentage | 3P% | 3-point field-goal percentage | FT% | Free-throw percentage |
| RPG | Rebounds per game | APG | Assists per game | SPG | Steals per game |
| BPG | Blocks per game | PPG | Points per game | PIR | Performance index rating |
| **Bold** | Career high |

| Led the league |

=== EuroLeague ===
| Year | Team | GP | GS | MPG | FG% | 3P% | FT% | RPG | APG | SPG | BPG | PPG | PIR |
|---|---|---|---|---|---|---|---|---|---|---|---|---|---|
| 2000–01 | Žalgiris | 5 | 5 | **30.5** | **.697** | .333 | .632 | **8.2** | **2.0** | **1.6** | .4 | **12.8** | **19.2** |
| 2001–02 | Žalgiris | 11 | 10 | 26.0 | .517 | **.533** | .545 | 5.9 | 1.7 | 1.1 | .7 | 8.9 | 11.7 |
| 2004–05 | Prokom Trefl Sopot | 18 | 17 | 24.0 | .628 | .160 | .391 | 5.4 | 1.7 | 1.2 | .6 | 7.1 | 10.6 |
| 2005–06 | Prokom Trefl Sopot | 14 | 10 | 23.4 | .667 | .400 | .367 | 5.6 | 1.8 | .9 | **.9** | 5.8 | 10.2 |
| 2006–07 | Prokom Trefl Sopot | **20** | **19** | 20.1 | .517 | .278 | **.733** | 3.9 | 1.0 | 1.0 | .3 | 4.3 | 5.8 |
| 2007–08 | Prokom Trefl Sopot | 13 | 13 | 21.2 | .478 | .273 | .389 | 3.6 | 1.1 | .8 | .1 | 2.9 | 4.5 |
| 2008–09 | Žalgiris | 4 | 0 | 12.5 | .000 | .000 | .000 | 2.3 | .8 | .3 | .0 | .0 | .5 |

== State awards ==
- Lithuania: Recipient of the Officer's Cross of the Order of the Lithuanian Grand Duke Gediminas (1999)
- Lithuania: Recipient of the Commander's Cross of the Order of the Lithuanian Grand Duke Gediminas (2001)

== Personal life ==
In 1998, Masiulis graduated from the Kaunas University of Technology.

Masiulis' son, Gytis Masiulis, also is a professional basketball player. He debuted with the primary Žalgiris Kaunas roster in 2017.
