= 2019–20 King Mindaugas Cup =

2019–20 Karaliaus Mindaugo taurė
Tournament details
- Country: Lithuania
- City: Klaipėda
- Venue(s): Švyturys Arena
- Dates: 8 October 2019 – 16 February 2020
- Teams: 16
- Defending champions: Rytas

Final positions
- Champions: Žalgiris (3rd title)
- Runners-up: Rytas
- Third place: Lietkabelis

Awards
- MVP: (Lithuania) Edgaras Ulanovas

The 2019–20 King Mindaugas Cup, also known as Citadele Karaliaus Mindaugo taurė for sponsorship purposes, was the fifth edition of the Lithuanian King Mindaugas Cup. Žalgiris won their third cup after defeating defending champions Rytas in the final 80–60.

== Format ==
All 10 teams from 2019–20 LKL season and 6 teams from 2019–20 NKL season participated in this tournament. Top four teams from 2018–19 LKL season have received bye's to quarterfinals stage, while the rest of the LKL teams and NKL teams will be drawn into pairs, with the two highest ranked pair winners from 2018 to 2019 LKL season advancing straight into Quarterfinals, while the remaining pair winners will advance to the second round, where once again will be drawn into pairs. The second round pair winners will advance to the Quarterfinals.

== Round 1 ==
5–10 ranked teams from 2018 to 2019 LKL season and 6 2019–20 NKL season teams faced-off each other in a home-and-away format, with the overall cumulative score determining the winner of a match. The winners advanced to the next round.

Team 1	Agg.	Team 2	1st leg	2nd leg
Cbet Prienai	174–143	Šilutė	86–68	88–75
Šiauliai	190–146	Kuršiai	88–81	102–65
Pieno žvaigždės	148–132	Telšiai	68–63	80–69
Juventus	196–124	Sūduva-Mantinga	103–67	93–57
Sintek–Dzūkija	152–126	Tauragė	79–71	73–55
Nevėžis	189–131	Ežerūnas	102–70	87–61

== Round 2 ==
Two highest ranked pair winners from 2018 to 2019 LKL season received bye's into Quarterfinals, while the remaining teams faced-off each other in a home-and-away format, with the overall cumulative score determining the winner of a match. The winners earned the remaining quarterfinals spots.

Team 1	Agg.	Team 2	1st leg	2nd leg
Pieno žvaigždės	Bye	N/A	—	—
Juventus	Bye	N/A	—	—
Cbet Prienai	181–188	Šiauliai	80–85	101–103
Sintek–Dzūkija	157–144	Nevėžis	75–71	82–73

== Quarterfinals ==
Top four teams from 2018–19 LKL season have received bye's to quarterfinals stage. Those teams are:

- Žalgiris
- Rytas
- Lietkabelis
- Neptūnas

All qualified teams will be drawn into pairs, where they will face-off each other in a home-and-away format, with the overall cumulative score determining the winner of a match. The winners of each pair would then qualify for the Final four.

Team 1	Agg.	Team 2	1st leg	2nd leg
Žalgiris	190–145	Šiauliai	85–79	105–66
Lietkabelis	175–157	Pieno žvaigždės	78–72	97–85
Rytas	184–179	Juventus	81–85	103–94
Neptūnas	165–161	Sintek–Dzūkija	92–89	73–72

== Final four ==
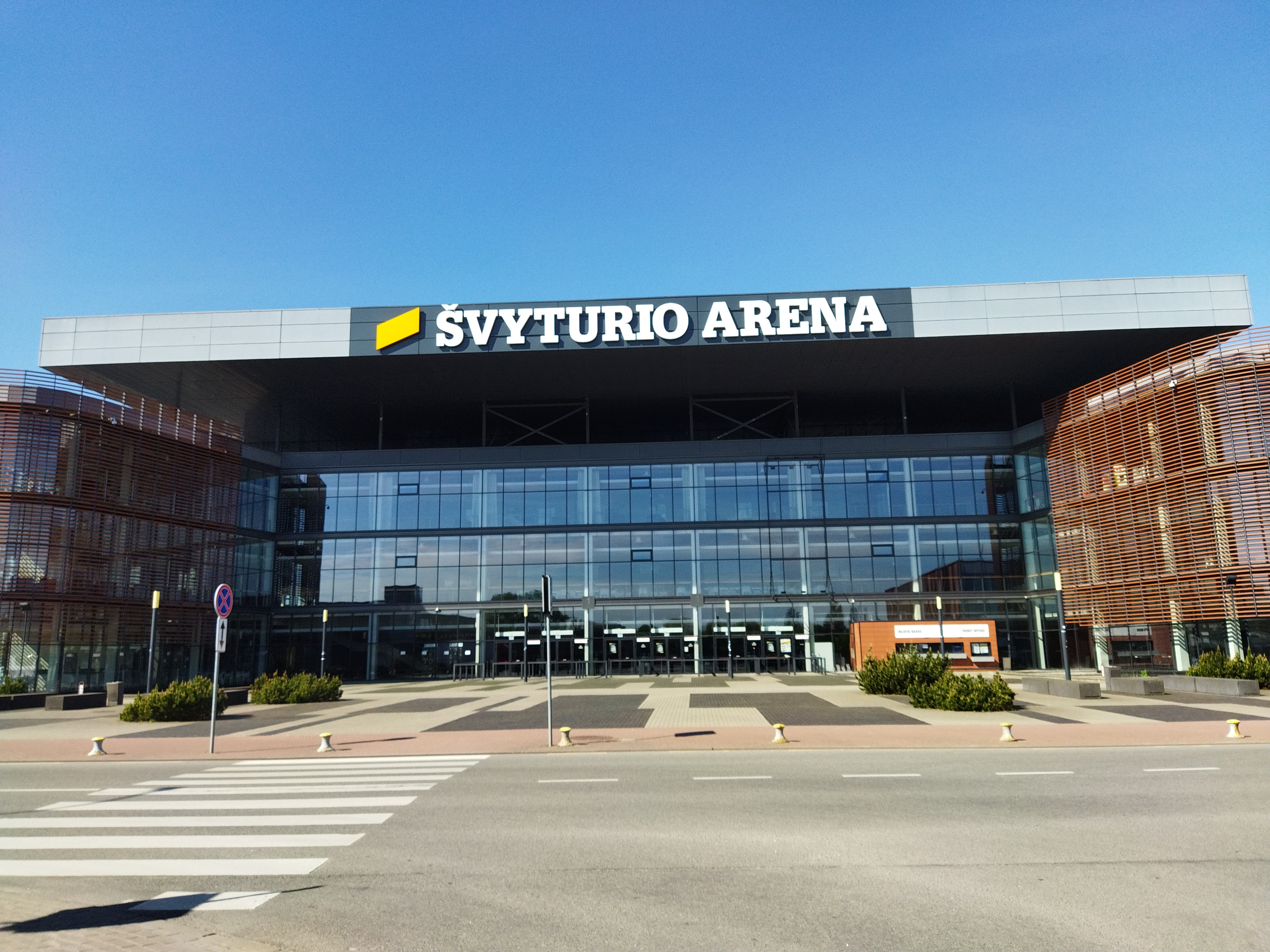
Švyturys Arena in Klaipėda, Lithuania

The final four was hosted by the Švyturys Arena in Klaipėda on 15–16 February 2020.

Semifinals; 15 February
Žalgiris	82
Lietkabelis	72
Rytas	96
Neptūnas	71

Final; 16 February
Žalgiris	80
Rytas	60
Third place 16 February
Lietkabelis	84
Neptūnas	73

=== Semifinals ===
15 February 2020	Žalgiris	82–72	Lietkabelis	Klaipėda
14:00 (EET)	Scoring by quarter: 19–17, 19–21, 27–14, 17–20
	Pts: Ulanovas 17; Rebs: LeDay 6 Asts: Lekavičius 5 PIR: Ulanovas 25	Boxscore	Pts: Valinskas 14; Rebs: Maldūnas 9 Asts: Normantas 4 PIR: Three players 13	Arena: Švyturys Arena; Attendance: 2,527; Referees: Tomas Jasevičius, Artūras Šukys, Gvidas Gedvilas

15 February 2020	Rytas	96–71	Neptūnas	Klaipėda
16:30 (EET)	Scoring by quarter: 22―10, 25―25, 28―18, 21―18
	Pts: Holloway 19; Rebs: Blaževič 10; Asts: Cruz 5 PIR: Holloway 29	Boxscore	Pts: Gailius 13; Rebs: Galdikas 7 Asts: Janavičius 5 PIR: Olisevičius 17	Arena: Švyturys Arena; Attendance: 3,780; Referees: Jurgis Laurinavičius, Gytis Vilius, Gintaras Vitkauskas

=== Third place ===
16 February 2020	Lietkabelis	84–73	Neptūnas	Klaipėda
14:45 (EET)	Scoring by quarter: 17―25, 18―20 , 32―11, 17―17
	Pts: Dimša 20; Rebs: Lipkevičius 6 Asts: Šakić 6 PIR: Šakić 22	Boxscore	Pts: Gailius 24; Rebs: Masiulis 9 Asts: Janavičius 5 PIR: Gailius 18	Arena: Švyturys Arena; Attendance: 4,965; Referees: Artūras Šukys, Gintaras Vitkauskas, Andrius Maleckas

=== Final ===
16 February 2020	Žalgiris	80–60	Rytas	Klaipėda
17:50 (EET)	Scoring by quarter: 24―21, 15―15, 21―7, 20―17
	Pts: LeDay, Ulanovas 18; Rebs: Jankūnas 7 Asts: Walkup 8 PIR: Jankūnas 17	Boxscore	Pts: Cruz 14; Rebs: Bendžius, Cruz 6 Asts: Holloway 4 PIR: Bendžius 13	Arena: Švyturys Arena; Attendance: 5,680; Referees: Gytis Vilius, Tomas Jasevičius, Jurgis Laurinavičius

2019–20 King Mindaugas Cup champions
Žalgiris
(3rd title)
