= 2022–23 King Mindaugas Cup =

2022–23 Karaliaus Mindaugo taurė
Tournament details
- Country: Lithuania
- City: Šiauliai
- Venue(s): Šiauliai Arena
- Dates: 10 October 2022 – 19 February 2023
- Teams: 12
- Defending champions: Žalgiris

Final positions
- Champions: Žalgiris (6th title)
- Runners-up: Cbet
- Third place: 7Bet–Lietkabelis

Awards
- MVP: (Lithuania) Edgaras Ulanovas

The 2022–23 King Mindaugas Cup, also known as Citadele Karaliaus Mindaugo taurė for sponsorship purposes, was the eighth edition of the Lithuanian King Mindaugas Cup. Žalgiris successfully defended the title for the 3rd time in a row after defeating Cbet in the final 81–77.

== Format ==
All 12 teams from 2022–23 LKL season participated in this tournament. Top three teams from 2021–22 LKL season have received bye's to quarterfinals stage, while 4-10 ranked teams were drawn into two groups, with the group winners and runners-up advancing straight to the Quarterfinals, while third-placed teams faced off each other for the final Quarterfinals spot. 11th placed team faced off against LKL debutants in the preliminary round for the final Group stage spot.

== Preliminary round ==
Team 1	Agg.	Team 2	1st leg	2nd leg
Gargždai	153–157	Labas Gas	76–67	77–90

== Group stage ==
=== Group A ===
Pos	Team	Pld	W	L	PF	PA	PD	Qualification	NEP	WOL	JUV	PRI
1	Neptūnas	6	5	1	575	507	+68	Advance to Quarterfinals	—	99–86	92–90	110–89
2	Wolves	6	4	2	530	477	+53	Advance to Quarterfinals	84–90	—	100–85	95–70
3	Uniclub Casino – Juventus	6	3	3	555	541	+14	Advance to Eightfinal	95–86	79–94	—	103–85
4	Labas Gas	6	0	6	461	596	−135		72–105	68–76	77–107	—

Source: LKL.LT

=== Group B ===
Pos	Team	Pld	W	L	PF	PA	PD	Qualification	NEV	JSK	SIA	PZV
1	Nevėžis–Optibet	6	4	2	568	554	+14	Advance to Quarterfinals	—	85–80	90–87	122–118
2	Cbet	6	4	2	484	460	+24	Advance to Quarterfinals	82–80	—	82–66	81–70
3	Šiauliai	6	3	3	497	501	−4	Advance to Eightfinal	101–106	83–79	—	79–73
4	Pieno žvaigždės	6	1	5	494	528	−34		86–85	76–80	71–81	—

Source: LKL.LT

=== Eightfinal ===
Third ranked teams from each group faced-off each other in a single-leg match, with the host being decided by LKL standings at the time. The winner earned the last quarterfinals spot.

8 December 2022	Šiauliai	91–112	Uniclub Casino – Juventus	Šiauliai
21:00 (EET)	Scoring by quarter: 20–19, 23–32, 24–38, 24–23
	Pts: Urbutis 20; Rebs: Urbutis 8 Asts: Jackson 8 PIR: Urbutis 27	Boxscore	Pts: Evans 25; Rebs: Hamilton 10; Asts: Hamilton 10; PIR: Hamilton 36	Arena: Šiauliai Arena; Attendance: 972; Referees: Artūras Šukys, Juozas Barkauskas, Andžej Urbanovič

== Quarterfinals ==
Top three teams from 2021–22 LKL season have received bye's to quarterfinals stage. Those teams were:

- 7Bet–Lietkabelis
- Rytas
- Žalgiris

All qualified teams will be drawn into pairs, where they will face-off each other in a home-and-away format, with the overall cumulative score determining the winner of a match. The winners of each pair would then qualify for the Final four.

Team 1	Agg.	Team 2	1st leg	2nd leg
Rytas	168–156	Nevėžis–Optibet	70–78	98–78
Cbet	161–155	Neptūnas	85–80	76–75
7Bet–Lietkabelis	194–154	Uniclub Casino – Juventus	85–81	109–73
Žalgiris	186–151	Wolves	95–79	91–72

== Final four ==
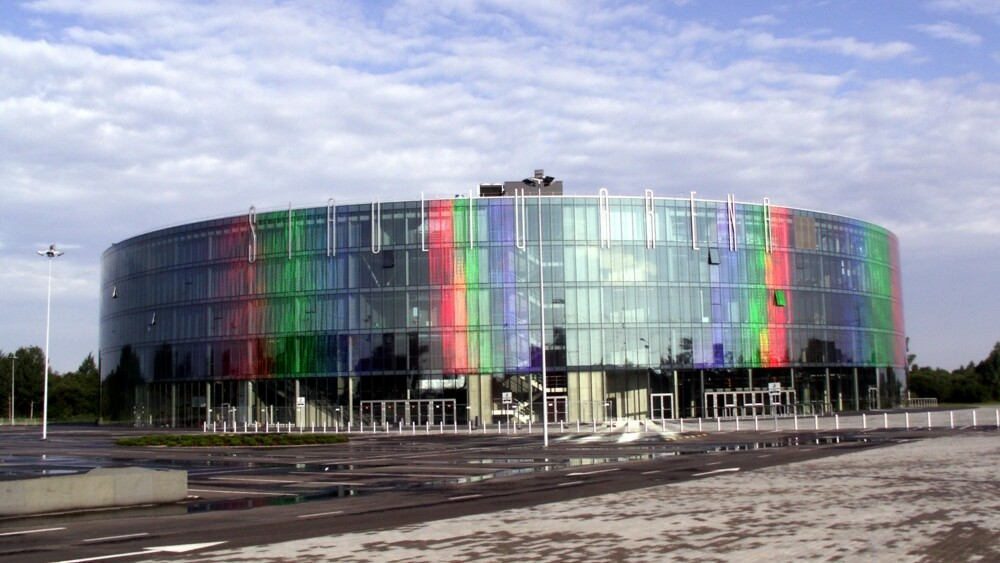
Šiauliai Arena in Šiauliai, Lithuania

The final four was hosted by the Šiauliai Arena in Šiauliai on 18–19 February 2023.

Semifinals; 18 February
Rytas	86
Cbet	92
7Bet–Lietkabelis	67
Žalgiris	77

Final; 19 February
Cbet	77
Žalgiris	81
Third place 19 February
Rytas	88
7Bet–Lietkabelis	91

=== Semifinals ===
18 February 2023	7Bet–Lietkabelis	67–77	Žalgiris	Šiauliai
20:15 (EET)	Scoring by quarter: 17–17, 12–21, 16–17, 22–22
	Pts: Golomán, Morris 14; Rebs: Kullamäe 5 Asts: Kullamäe 4 PIR: Maldūnas 12	Boxscore	Pts: Lekavičius 16; Rebs: Ulanovas 8 Asts: Ulanovas 9 PIR: Ulanovas 21	Arena: Šiauliai Arena; Attendance: 4,411; Referees: Gytis Vilius, Jurgis Laurinavičius, Gvidas Gedvilas

18 February 2023	Rytas	86–92	Cbet	Šiauliai
17:30 (EET)	Scoring by quarter: 15―25, 30―15, 18―28, 23―24
	Pts: Foster 20; Rebs: Masiulis 8 Asts: Friðriksson 8 PIR: Echodas 20	Boxscore	Pts: Šeškus 24; Rebs: Huskić 7 Asts: Huskić 8 PIR: Šeškus 24	Arena: Šiauliai Arena; Attendance: 4,301; Referees: Saulius Račys, Artūras Šukys, Juozas Barkauskas

=== Third place ===
19 February 2023	Rytas	88–91	7Bet–Lietkabelis	Šiauliai
15:45 (EET)	Scoring by quarter: 21―18, 21―29, 14―23, 32―21
	Pts: Foster 35; Rebs: Radzevičius 9 Asts: Friðriksson 6 PIR: Foster 37	Boxscore	Pts: Orelik 14; Rebs: four players 5 Asts: Orelik 6 PIR: Lipkevičius 18	Arena: Šiauliai Arena; Attendance: 5,027; Referees: Jurgis Laurinavičius, Artūras Šukys, Gintaras Mačiulis

=== Final ===
19 February 2023	Cbet	77–81	Žalgiris	Šiauliai
19:15 (EET)	Scoring by quarter: 17―26, 16―14, 23―15, 21―26
	Pts: Šeškus 17; Rebs: Garrett 7 Asts: Watson 5 PIR: Šeškus, Watson 14	Boxscore	Pts: Ulanovas 22; Rebs: Laurynas Birutis, Butkevičius 7 Asts: three players 2 PIR: Ulanovas 27	Arena: Šiauliai Arena; Attendance: 5,359; Referees: Gytis Vilius, Saulius Račys, Gvidas Gedvilas

2022–23 King Mindaugas Cup champions
Žalgiris
(6th title)
