= Kevarrius Hayes =

Central African-American basketball player

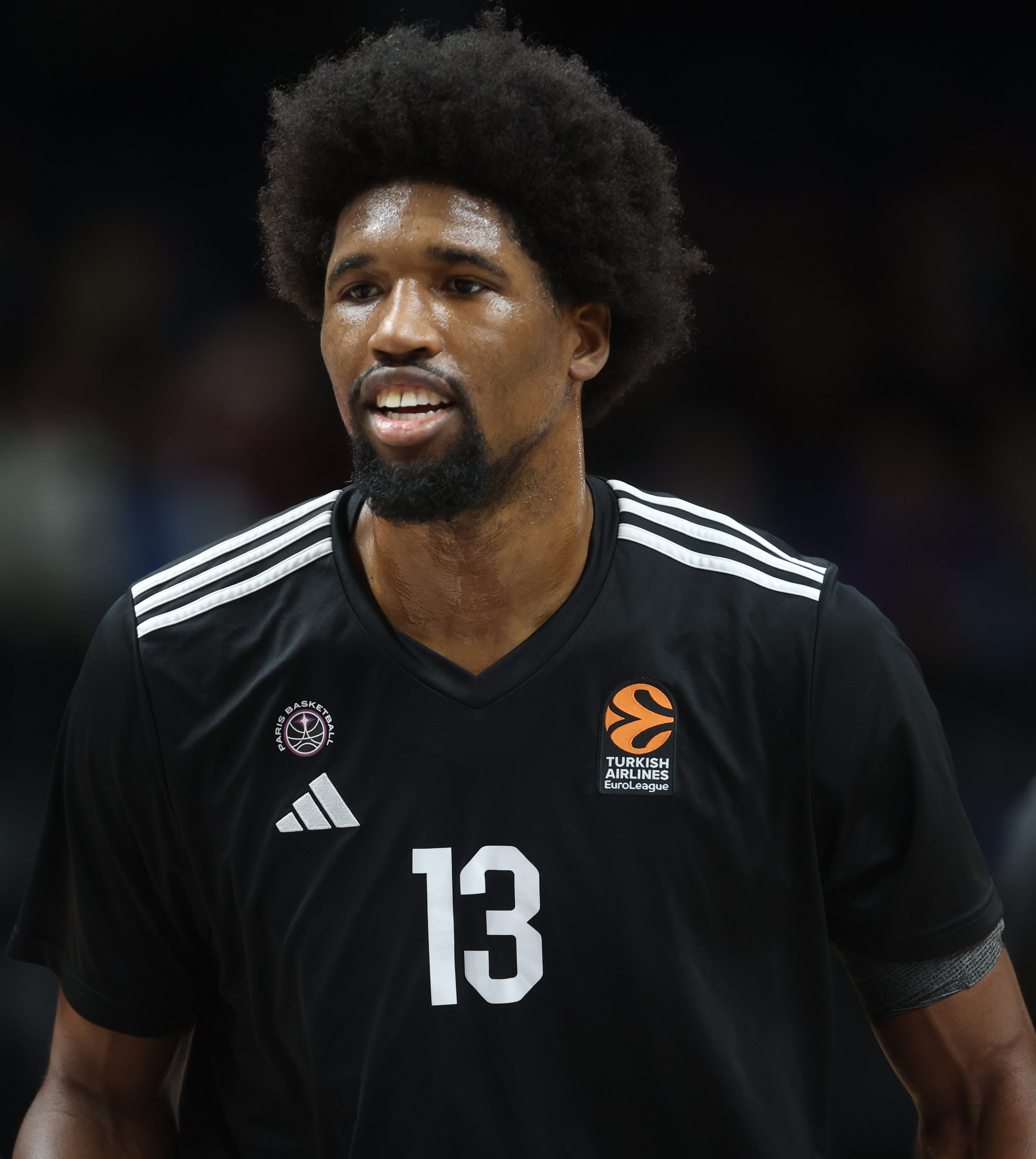
- Hayes with Paris in October 2024

No. 13 – Partizan Belgrade
- Position: Center
- League: Serbian SuperLeague; ABA League; EuroLeague

Personal information
- Born: March 5, 1997 (age 29) Live Oak, Florida, U.S.
- Listed height: 2.06 m (6 ft 9 in)
- Listed weight: 103 kg (227 lb)

Career information
- High school: Suwannee (Live Oak, Florida)
- College: Florida (2015–2019)
- NBA draft: 2019: undrafted
- Playing career: 2019–present

Career history
- 2019–2020: Cantù
- 2020–2021: ASVEL
- 2021–2022: Bursaspor
- 2022–2024: Žalgiris Kaunas
- 2024–2025: Paris Basketball
- 2025–2026: AS Monaco
- 2026–present: Partizan

Career highlights
- 3× French League champion (2021, 2025, 2026); 3× French Cup winner (2021, 2025, 2026); French League Cup winner (2026); French Supercup winner (2025); LKL champion (2023); 2× King Mindaugas Cup winner (2023, 2024)

Kevarrius Keshawn Hayes (born March 5, 1997) is an American-born naturalized Central African professional basketball player for Partizan Belgrade of the Serbian SuperLeague, the ABA League, and the EuroLeague. He played college basketball for the Florida Gators. He represents the Central African Republic in international competition.

== Early life ==
Hayes was born and grew up in Live Oak, Florida and attended Suwannee High School. He was student body president. Ranked the 58th-best college prospect by ESPN.com for his class, Hayes committed to play college basketball at the University of Florida as a sophomore in high school. He was named second team Class 5A All-State in both his junior and senior seasons.

== College career ==
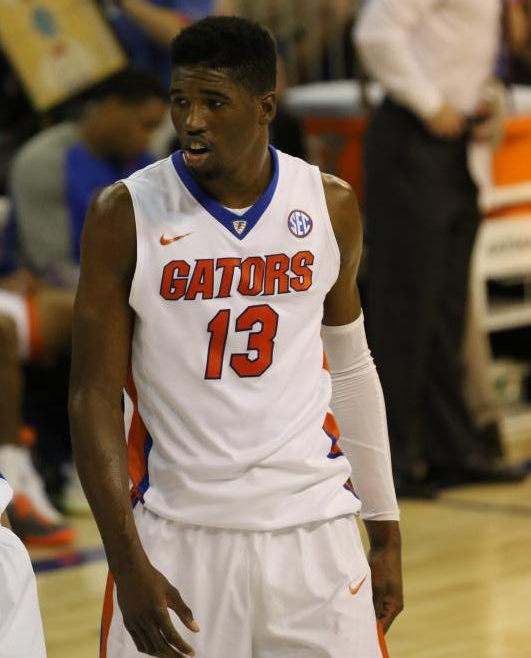
Hayes with Florida in December 2015

Hayes was a member of the Florida Gators for four seasons. He played mostly as a backup center during his true freshman season, starting six of 35 games played, and averaged 2.8 points and 2.6 rebounds per game. He saw more playing time and became a starter for the team towards the end of his sophomore season, averaging 6.3 points and 4.4 rebounds per game and led the team with 60 blocked shots.

As a junior, Hayes averaged 4.8 points and five rebounds over 33 games played (25 starts) and again led the team and finished 5th in the Southeastern Conference (SEC) with 67 blocks. In his senior season, Hayes set career highs with 8.3 points and 6.3 rebounds per game over 36 games, starting all but one, and led the team a third straight year with 67 blocks (3rd in the SEC). He finished his collegiate career with averages of 5.6 points, 4.6 rebounds, and 1.5 blocks per game in 140 games played (82 starts). His 214 career blocks were the second most in Gators history.

== Professional career ==
=== Cantu (2019–2020) ===
On July 8, 2019, Hayes signed with Pallacanestro Cantù of the Italian Lega Basket Serie A. In his first professional season, Hayes averaged 9.6 points, 7.3 rebounds and led Serie A with 2.6 blocks per game and was named honorable mention All-Serie A by Eurobasket.com.

=== ASVEL (2020–2021) ===
On June 8, 2020, Hayes signed a one-year deal with ASVEL of the French LNB Pro A.

=== Bursaspor (2021–2022) ===
On July 2, 2021, Hayes signed with Frutti Extra Bursaspor of the Turkish Basketbol Süper Ligi (BSL). In 53 games played for Bursaspor, Hayes averaged 9.4 points, 6.5 rebounds, 1.1 steals and 1.3 blocks per game.

=== Žalgiris (2022–2024) ===
On July 29, 2022, Hayes signed a one-year contract with Žalgiris Kaunas of the Lithuanian Basketball League (LKL), with an option for an additional year. On May 29, 2023, Hayes renewed his contract for two (1+1) more seasons. He helped Žalgiris win the Lithuanian championship in 2023 and the Lithuanian Cup tournament in 2023 and 2024. He parted ways with the club on July 17, 2024.

=== Paris Basketball (2024–2025) ===
On July 23, 2024, Hayes signed a one-year deal with Paris Basketball of the French LNB Élite and the EuroLeague.

=== AS Monaco (2025–2026) ===
On June 30, 2025, Hayes signed a two-year contract with AS Monaco of the French LNB Élite and the Euroleague. On February 2, 2026, Hayes suffered a fractured cheekbone during the game against Virtus Bologna.

=== Partizan (2026–present) ===
On July 19, 2026, Hayes signed with Partizan of the Serbian SuperLeague, the ABA League, and the EuroLeague. He signed a two-year contract.

== National team career ==
Hayes was on the roster for the Central African Republic national basketball team for AfroBasket 2021.

== Career statistics ==
Legend
GP	Games played	GS	Games started	MPG	Minutes per game
FG%	Field-goal percentage	3P%	3-point field-goal percentage	FT%	Free-throw percentage
RPG	Rebounds per game	APG	Assists per game	SPG	Steals per game
BPG	Blocks per game	PPG	Points per game	PIR	Performance index rating
**Bold**	Career high

=== EuroLeague ===
Year	Team	GP	GS	MPG	FG%	3P%	FT%	RPG	APG	SPG	BPG	PPG	PIR
2020–21	ASVEL	20	3	10.9	.452	.000	.636	2.6	**.5**	.4	**.9**	3.0	4.4
2022–23	Žalgiris	**37**	**28**	17.6	.500	—	.724	**4.4**	**.5**	**.7**	**.9**	5.4	**7.8**
2023–24	Žalgiris	34	15	**18.6**	**.566**	**.667**	**.771**	4.0	**.5**	**.7**	.7	**5.6**	7.4
Career		91	46	16.5	.522	.500	.714	3.9	.5	.6	.9	4.9	6.9
