= Arnas Butkevičius =

Lithuanian basketball player (born 1992)

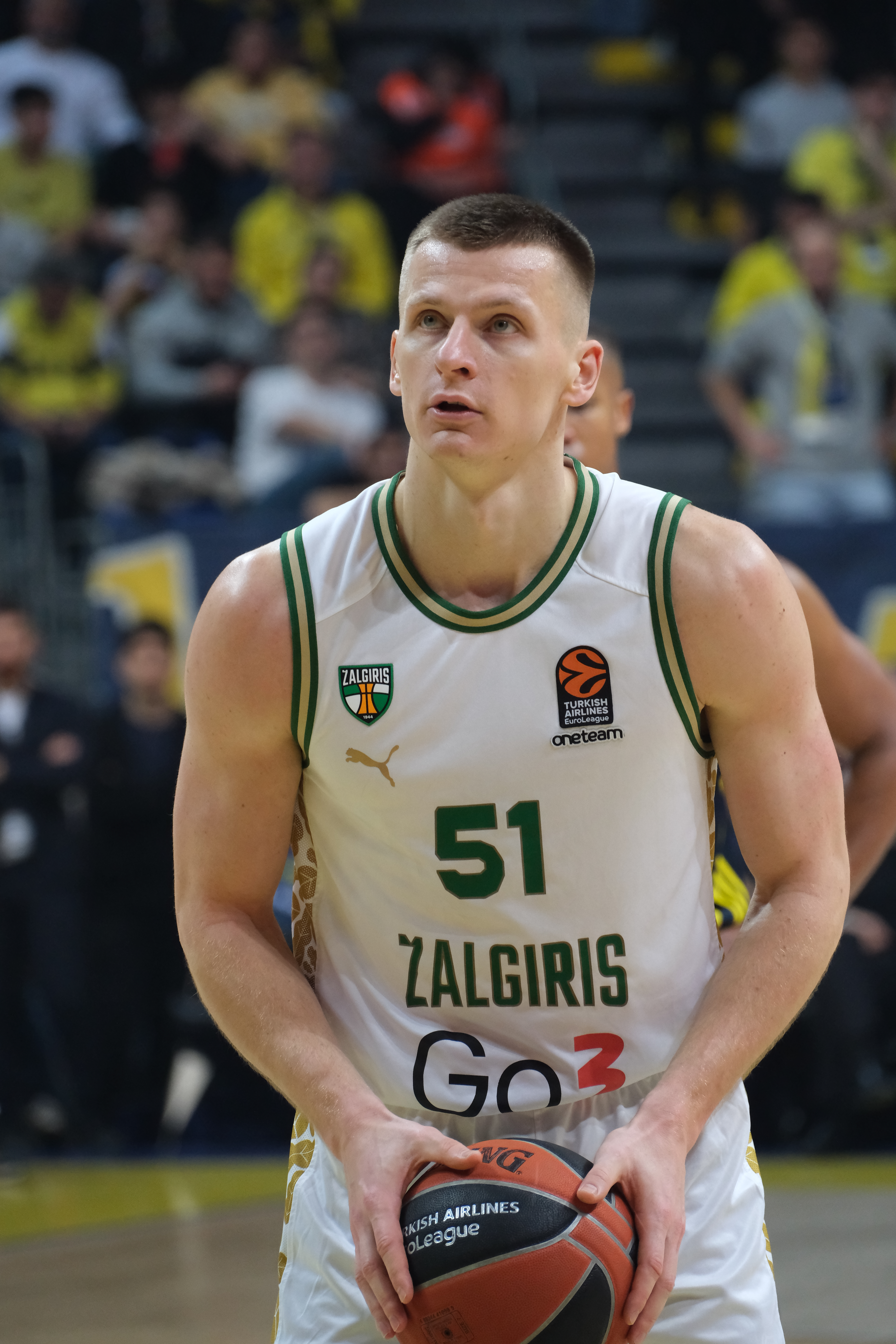
- Butkevičius with Žalgiris Kaunas in 2025

No. 51 – Žalgiris Kaunas
- Position: Small forward / power forward
- League: LKL; EuroLeague

Personal information
- Born: 22 October 1992 (age 33) Klaipėda, Lithuania
- Listed height: 1.97 m (6 ft 6 in)
- Listed weight: 95 kg (209 lb)

Career information
- NBA draft: 2014: undrafted
- Playing career: 2009–present

Career history
- 2009–2010: Kuršiai Neringa
- 2010–2012: Sakalai Vilnius
- 2012–2013: Lietkabelis Panevėžys
- 2013–2017: Neptūnas Klaipėda
- 2017–2022: Rytas Vilnius
- 2022–present: Žalgiris Kaunas

Career highlights
- 4× LKL champion (2022, 2023, 2025, 2026); LKL Finals MVP (2022); 3× All-LKL Team (2019, 2020, 2022); 4× King Mindaugas Cup winner (2019, 2023, 2024, 2026)
Medals
Men's basketball
Representing Lithuania
FIBA World Under-19 Championship
Gold medal – first place	2011 Latvia	National Team
FIBA Europe Under-20 Championship
Gold medal – first place	2012 Slovenia	National Team

Arnas Butkevičius (born 22 October 1992) is a Lithuanian professional basketball player for Žalgiris Kaunas of the Lithuanian Basketball League (LKL) and the EuroLeague.

== Professional career ==
Arnas was alumni of V.Knašius Basketball School at his young age, started his professional career at Neringa's Kuršiai in third Lithuanian league when he was 17. Next season he joined Sakalai in LKL. Arnas joined Neptūnas in 2013, after showing good performance in Lithuanian Basketball League playing for BC Lietkabelis scoring 8.1 points and 3.4 rebounds and 1.4 steals at his last season there, before the end of the season he joined Neptūnas for the playoffs. He quickly became an important part for the team, helping Neptūnas reach the LKL finals twice, as well as playing in the EuroLeague and EuroCup competitions.

== Career statistics ==
Legend
GP	Games played	GS	Games started	MPG	Minutes per game
FG%	Field-goal percentage	3P%	3-point field-goal percentage	FT%	Free-throw percentage
RPG	Rebounds per game	APG	Assists per game	SPG	Steals per game
BPG	Blocks per game	PPG	Points per game	PIR	Performance index rating
**Bold**	Career high

=== EuroLeague ===
Year	Team	GP	GS	MPG	FG%	3P%	FT%	RPG	APG	SPG	BPG	PPG	PIR
2014–15	Neptūnas	10	1	20.4	.558	.471	.519	2.8	1.1	.9	**.5**	**7.0**	**7.8**
2022–23	Žalgiris	**37**	12	**22.5**	.414	.254	.873	3.6	**1.6**	**1.1**	.3	5.3	7.4
2023–24	Žalgiris	22	6	20.9	.507	.389	.704	3.3	.9	.6	.1	5.0	5.7
2024–25	Žalgiris	33	**17**	22.0	.412	.380	.743	**3.7**	1.2	1.0	.3	4.5	6.5
2025–26	Žalgiris	16	7	18.2	**.596**	**.545**	**1**	2.6	1.2	.8	.1	5.5	7.6
Career		118	42	21.3	.469	.375	.759	3.4	1.3	.9	.2	5.2	6.9

=== EuroCup ===
Year	Team	GP	GS	MPG	FG%	3P%	FT%	RPG	APG	SPG	BPG	PPG	PIR
2014–15	Neptūnas	6	0	17.6	.526	.500	.600	1.5	2.0	.3	.2	5.0	6.0
2015–16	Neptūnas	16	**14**	21.3	.420	.192	.620	4.3	1.6	.9	.2	5.9	7.9
2017–18	Lietuvos rytas / Rytas Vilnius	5	4	18.7	.357	.250	**.875**	2.2	2.2	.4	**.6**	3.8	5.0
2018–19	Lietuvos rytas / Rytas Vilnius	**18**	7	26.8	.414	.346	.778	**4.9**	2.1	**1.2**	.2	6.1	9.3
2019–20	Lietuvos rytas / Rytas Vilnius	16	12	**27.2**	**.564**	**.577**	.788	4.8	**2.7**	.9	.4	**8.1**	**14.0**
Career		61	37	23.9	.464	.372	.715	4.1	2.1	.9	.3	6.2	9.5
