= 2018–19 King Mindaugas Cup =

2018–19 Karaliaus Mindaugo taurė
Tournament details
- Country: Lithuania
- City: Vilnius
- Venue(s): Rytas Arena; Siemens Arena
- Dates: 9 October 2018 – 17 February 2019
- Teams: 14
- Defending champions: Žalgiris

Final positions
- Champions: Rytas (2nd title)
- Runners-up: Žalgiris
- Third place: Lietkabelis

Awards
- MVP: (Belarus) Artsiom Parakhouski

The 2018–19 King Mindaugas Cup, also known as Kidy Tour Karaliaus Mindaugo taurė for sponsorship purposes, was the fourth edition of the Lithuanian King Mindaugas Cup. Rytas won their second cup after defeating defending champions Žalgiris in the final 70–67.

== Format ==
All 10 teams from 2018–19 LKL season and top 4 teams from 2017–18 NKL season participated in this tournament. Top six teams from 2017–18 LKL season have received bye's to quarterfinals stage, while the rest of the LKL teams and NKL teams participated in two-stage qualifiers, where second round pair winners advanced to the Quarterfinals.

== Round 1 ==
7–10 ranked teams from 2017 to 2018 LKL season and top 4 2017–18 NKL season teams faced-off each other in a home-and-away format, with the overall cumulative score determining the winner of a match. The winners advanced to the next round.

Team 1	Agg.	Team 2	1st leg	2nd leg
Skycop Prienai	169–133	Vytis	78–54	91–79
Dzūkija	175–154	Žalgiris-2	89–84	86–70
Juventus	181–121	Neptūnas-Akvaservis	81–64	100–57
Nevėžis	169–155	Sūduva-Mantinga	82–75	87–80

== Round 2 ==
First round winners faced-off each other in a home-and-away format, with the overall cumulative score determining the winner of a match. The winners earned the remaining quarterfinals spots.

Team 1	Agg.	Team 2	1st leg	2nd leg
Nevėžis	127–155	Juventus	56–77	71–78
Skycop Prienai	162–152	Dzūkija	83–84	79–68

== Quarterfinals ==
Top six teams from 2017–18 LKL season have received bye's to quarterfinals stage. Those teams are:

- Žalgiris
- Rytas
- Neptūnas
- Lietkabelis
- Šiauliai
- Pieno žvaigždės

All qualified teams will be drawn into pairs, where they will face-off each other in a home-and-away format, with the overall cumulative score determining the winner of a match. The winners of each pair would then qualify for the Final four.

Team 1	Agg.	Team 2	1st leg	2nd leg
Šiauliai	136–204	Žalgiris	61–104	75–100
Pieno žvaigždės	147–182	Lietkabelis	68–78	79–104
Rytas	163–150	Juventus	87–85	76–65
Skycop Prienai	165–174	Neptūnas	85–85	80–89

== Final four ==
The final four was hosted by the Rytas Arena and Siemens Arena in Vilnius on 16–17 February 2019.

Semifinals; 16 February
Žalgiris	89
Lietkabelis	58
Rytas	86
Neptūnas	72

Final; 17 February
Žalgiris	67
Rytas	70
Third place 17 February
Lietkabelis	94
Neptūnas	67

=== Semifinals ===
16 February 2019	Žalgiris	89–58	Lietkabelis	Vilnius
15:10 (EET)	Scoring by quarter: 25–18, 21–12, 21–13, 22–15
	Pts: Grigonis 19; Rebs: Thompson 6 Asts: Westermann 5 PIR: Grigonis 27	Boxscore	Pts: Kupšas 12; Rebs: Kupšas 8 Asts: Iroegbu, Wilson 3 PIR: Kupšas 21	Arena: Siemens Arena; Attendance: 2,910; Referees: Tomas Jasevičius, Artūras Šukys, Vilius Mačiulaitis

16 February 2019	Rytas	86–72	Neptūnas	Vilnius
17:30 (EET)	Scoring by quarter: 33―23, 24―10, 20―16, 9―23
	Pts: Kramer 20; Rebs: Echodas 10; Asts: Kramer 5 PIR: Kramer 20	Boxscore	Pts: Williams 13; Rebs: Galdikas, Slavinskas 5 Asts: Weaver 4 PIR: Weaver 15	Arena: Rytas Arena; Attendance: 3,740; Referees: Luigi Lamonica, Jurgis Laurinavičius, Gytis Vilius

=== Third place ===
17 February 2019	Lietkabelis	94–67	Neptūnas	Vilnius
14:00 (EET)	Scoring by quarter: 29―17, 19―19, 21―22 , 25―9
	Pts: Kulvietis 24; Rebs: Kupšas 9 Asts: Sinovec, Valinskas 6 PIR: Kulvietis 32	Boxscore	Pts: Masiulis 15; Rebs: Olisevičius 11; Asts: Four players 3 PIR: Olisevičius 15	Arena: Siemens Arena; Attendance: 5,247; Referees: Gytis Vilius, Artūras Šukys, Gvidas Gedvilas

=== Final ===
17 February 2019	Žalgiris	67–70	Rytas	Vilnius
17:40 (EET)	Scoring by quarter: 11―13, 24―17, 16―13, 16―27
	Pts: Grigonis 15; Rebs: White 6 Asts: Westermann 5 PIR: Grigonis 18	Boxscore	Pts: Kramer 15; Rebs: Parakhouski 11; Asts: Kramer 4 PIR: Parakhouski 21	Arena: Siemens Arena; Attendance: 9,350; Referees: Luigi Lamonica, Tomas Jasevičius, Jurgis Laurinavičius

2018–19 King Mindaugas Cup champions
Rytas
(2nd title)
