= Laurynas Birutis =

Lithuanian basketball player

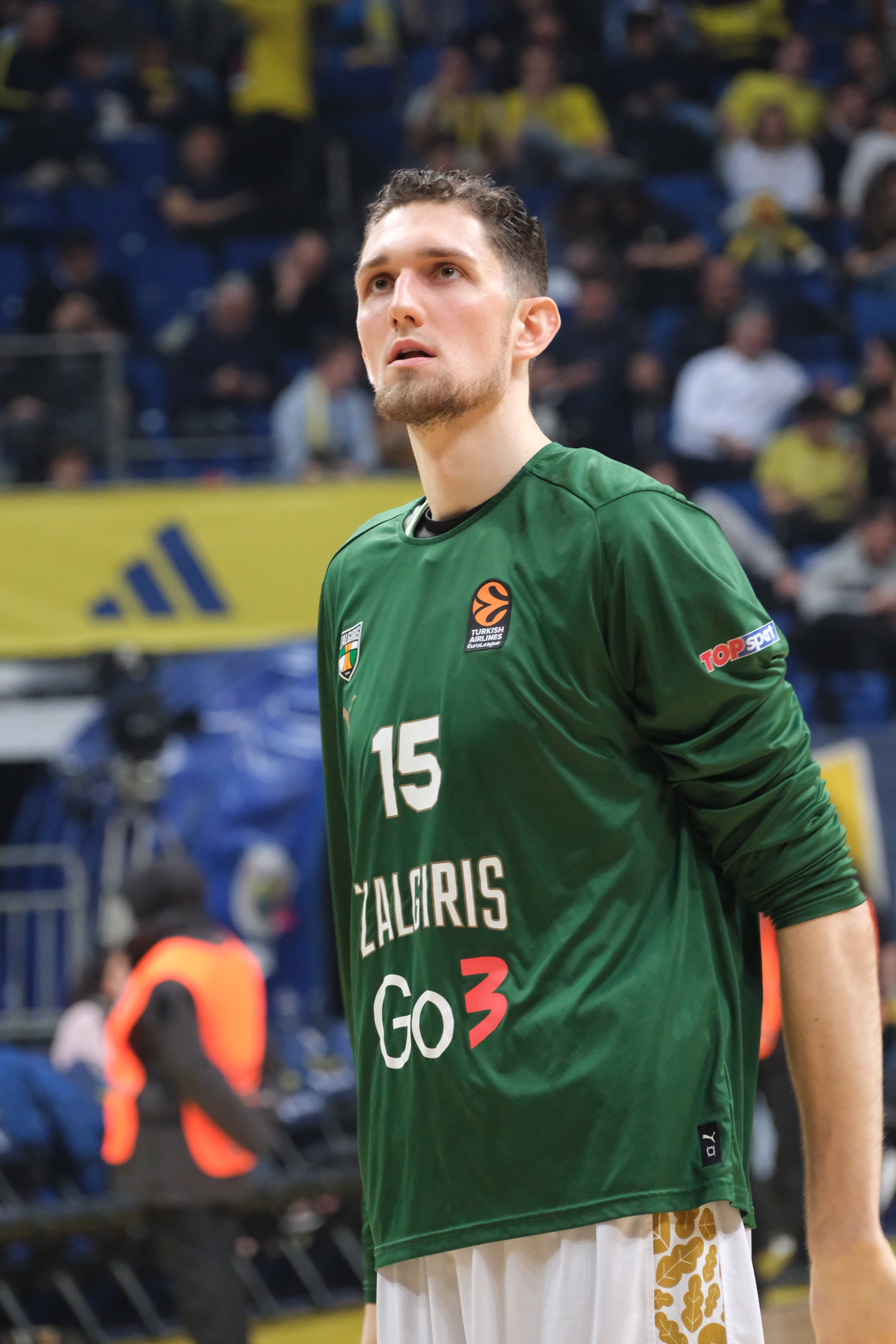
- Birutis with Žalgiris Kaunas in 2025

No. 15 – Basket Zaragoza
- Position: Center
- League: Liga ACB

Personal information
- Born: 27 August 1997 (age 29) Šiauliai, Lithuania
- Listed height: 2.13 m (7 ft 0 in)
- Listed weight: 114 kg (251 lb)

Career information
- NBA draft: 2019: undrafted
- Playing career: 2014–present

Career history
- 2014–2020: Žalgiris Kaunas
- 2014–2017: →Žalgiris-2
- 2017: →Vytautas Prienai–Birštonas
- 2017–2018: →Šiauliai
- 2019–2020: →CBet Prienai
- 2020–2022: Monbus Obradoiro
- 2022–2026: Žalgiris Kaunas
- 2026–present: Casademont Zaragoza

Career highlights
- LKL MVP (2018); 4× All-LKL Team (2020, 2023–2025); King Mindaugas Cup MVP (2024); 4× Lithuanian League champion (2019, 2023, 2025, 2026); 4× King Mindaugas Cup winner (2023–2026); LKL leading scorer (2018); LKL rebounding leader (2018); LKL blocks leader (2018); LKL Best Young Player (2018); LKL efficiency leader (2018, 2020)
Medals
Men's basketball
Representing Lithuania
FIBA Europe Under-20 Championship
Silver medal – second place	2016 Finland	U20 National Team
FIBA Europe Under-18 Championship
Bronze medal – third place	2015 Greece	U18 National Team

Laurynas Birutis (born 27 August 1997) is a Lithuanian professional basketball player for Casademont Zaragoza of the Liga ACB.

== Professional career ==
=== Žalgiris-2 and LKL debut (2014–2017) ===
Birutis began his professional career when he signed with BC Žalgiris-2 in the summer of 2014. On 5 January 2016, he set a National Basketball League record with 23 rebounds in a game against BC Petrochema. Later that season, he won silver medals with Žalgiris-2 after losing the final game against BC Sūduva.

On 14 April 2017, after dominating the second-tier National Basketball League by averaging 17.4 points, nine rebounds, 1.4 assists and two blocks per game, Birutis was invited to join Vytautas Prienai–Birštonas in the top-tier Lithuanian Basketball League. Birutis made a strong debut on 15 April 2017, scoring 17 points and grabbing four rebounds, but his team lost 92–89 after Justas Tamulis buzzer-beater. Two days later, he recorded his first LKL win 96–89 against Neptūnas Klaipėda and was the second-best Vytautas' scorer with 19 points and six rebounds.

=== BC Šiauliai (2017–2018) ===
On 1 August 2017, Birutis was loaned his hometown club BC Šiauliai. During the 2018 Karaliaus Mindaugo taurė quarterfinals against the Lithuanian champions Žalgiris Kaunas, Birutis played the best game of his career by scoring 35 points, grabbing 11 rebounds, dishing out 2 assists and blocking one shot, although his team lost 85–78. On 18 April 2018, Birutis entered his name into the 2018 NBA draft. During his second LKL season, he led the league in all three major statistical categories of his position, with 14.9 points, 7.3 rebounds and 1.3 blocks. For his performances throughout the campaign, Birutis received the LKL Most Valuable Player Award. Furthermore, with his help, BC Šiauliai recovered from the league's worst record last season (6–30) and became a solid playoff participant by finishing fifth in the regular season (16–20). At the season closing ceremony he was also named the LKL Best Young Player. It was also announced that Birutis would return to Žalgiris for the 2018–19 season.

=== Žalgiris Kaunas (2018–2019) ===
Birutis joined Lithuanian champions Žalgiris Kaunas and made his EuroLeague debut on 12 October 2018 against Saski Baskonia. He scored seven points in 10 minutes. Birutis struggled with injury since the start of the season and was unable to train due to pain, which led to surgery on 14 February 2019. On 1 June, he won his first LKL championship.

=== CBet Prienai (2019–2020) ===
For the 2019–20 season, Birutis was loaned to CBet Prienai. On November 23, he made his return to the court, scoring nine points and four rebounds in 16 minutes, including the game-winning shot, in a thrilling 81–79 win over BC Pieno žvaigždės. He was later named LKL Player of the Month for February. He had his best game on 1 February 2020 against BC Neptūnas, in which he scored 25 points and collected 36 efficiency points. He finished the 2019–20 LKL season as the league leader in efficiency, averaging 20.4 PIR per game. Additionally, he ranked second in the league in both scoring and rebounding with 15.2 points and seven rebounds per game.

=== Monbus Obradoiro (2020–2022) ===
On July 24, 2020, Birutis signed a two-year contract with Monbus Obradoiro of the Spanish Liga ACB. On 28 September 2020, Birutis was named Liga ACB MVP of September after averaging 19.3 points, 8 rebounds and 1 block per game.

=== Žalgiris Kaunas (2022–2026) ===
On 10 June 2022, Birutis returned to Žalgiris Kaunas, signing a two-year deal. He was named to the All-LKL Team for three consecutive seasons, from 2023 to 2025. On 9 April 2024, Birutis signed a contract extension through 2026.

=== Casademont Zaragoza (2026–present) ===
On 22 July 2026, Birutis signed a one-year deal with Cascademont Zaragoza, returning to the Liga ACB.

== National team career ==
Laurynas Birutis debuted for the Lithuania men's u-16 basketball team at the 2013 FIBA Europe Under-16 Championship in Ukraine. He won bronze medals with Lithuania men's u-18 basketball team at the 2015 FIBA Europe Under-18 Championship. Birutis, along with his teammates and generational peers Tadas Sedekerskis and Martynas Varnas, was invited to play at the FIBA's Youth All-Star Game during EuroBasket 2015. On 26 February 2018, Birutis made his debut with the Lithuania men's national basketball team by scoring 8 points and grabbing 6 rebounds, helping to beat the Kosovo national basketball team 106–50 during the 2019 FIBA Basketball World Cup qualification.

He had his second opportunity with the senior Lithuanian national team in a EuroBasket 2022 qualification game against the Czech Republic when he scored 17 points and three rebounds in 15 minutes, leading the team in +/- value (+20) in 97–89 comeback victory. Later he also represented Lithuania during the 2023 FIBA Basketball World Cup qualification. In 2025, Birutis was for the first time included into the final roster of the Lithuania men's national basketball team during a major tournament – EuroBasket 2025.

== Personal life ==
Laurynas is the son of former long-time BC Šiauliai player Sigitas Birutis.

== Career statistics ==
Legend
GP	Games played	GS	Games started	MPG	Minutes per game
FG%	Field-goal percentage	3P%	3-point field-goal percentage	FT%	Free-throw percentage
RPG	Rebounds per game	APG	Assists per game	SPG	Steals per game
BPG	Blocks per game	PPG	Points per game	PIR	Performance index rating
**Bold**	Career high

=== EuroLeague ===
Year	Team	GP	GS	MPG	FG%	3P%	FT%	RPG	APG	SPG	BPG	PPG	PIR
2018–19	Žalgiris	17	0	6.9	.586	—	.706	.9	.1	.1	.3	2.7	2.5
2022–23	Žalgiris	37	1	13.1	.635	—	**.736**	3.1	.4	**.2**	.3	5.4	7.1
2023–24	Žalgiris	34	**19**	**15.1**	.645	—	.618	**3.7**	**.6**	**.2**	.4	**7.5**	**8.9**
2024–25	Žalgiris	34	17	13.0	.635	—	.596	2.7	.4	.1	**.5**	5.3	5.4
2025–26	Žalgiris	**41**	10	9.9	**.692**	—	.407	2.4	.3	**.2**	.3	4.1	5.2
Career		163	47	12.0	.647	—	.593	2.7	.4	.2	.4	5.2	6.1
