= King Mindaugas Cup MVP =

The Karaliaus Mindaugo taurė MVP (transl. King Mindaugas MVP) is an award that is annually handed out to the most valuable player, in a given tournament, of the Karaliaus Mindaugo taurė professional basketball Lithuanian national domestic cup competition. The award was introduced when the competition was first held, in 2016. Antanas Kavaliauskas was the inaugural winner of the award. Since 2016, only two players have won the award more than once: Edgaras Ulanovas (4-time winner) and Joffrey Lauvergne (2-time winner). The current holder of the award is Moses Wright.

== Winners ==
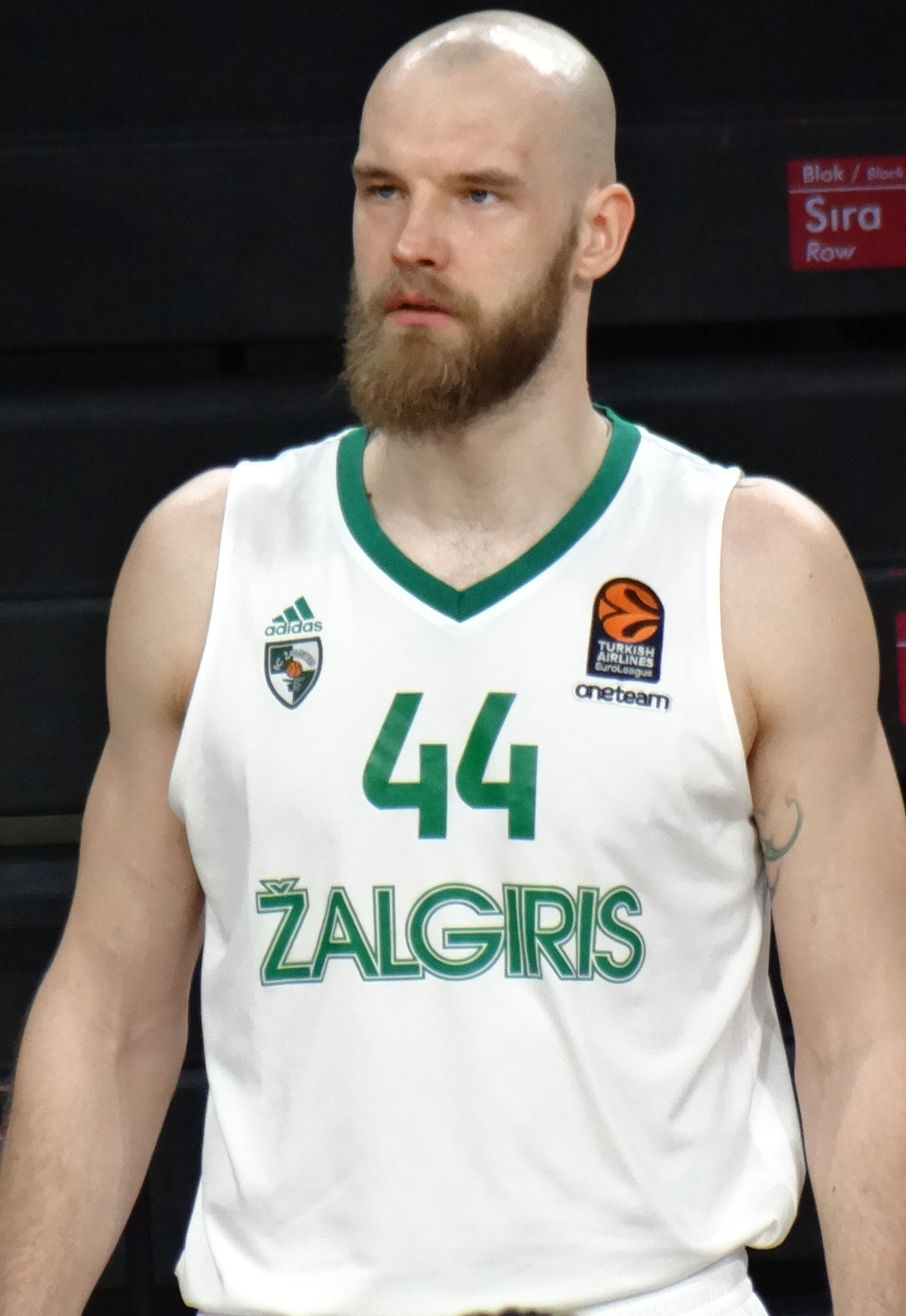
Antanas Kavaliauskas won the inaugural award, in 2016.

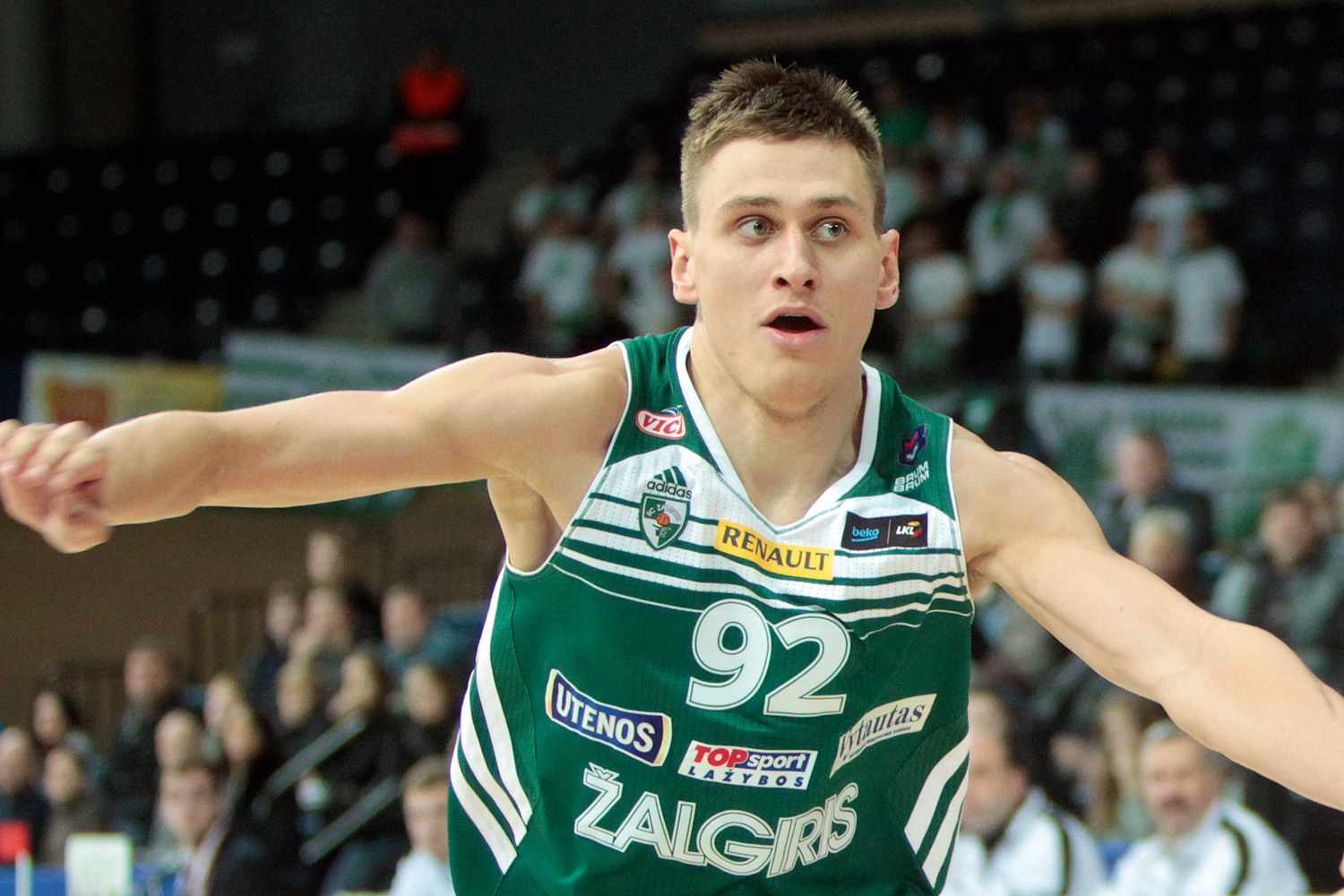
Edgaras Ulanovas was the second winner of the award.

Key
Player (X)	Name of the player, and number of times they had won the award at that point (if more than one).
Nationality	Nationality. as registered by FIBA, player may hold more nationalities.
†	Indicates multiple award winners in the same season.

Year	Player	Pos.	Nationality	Team	Ref.
2016	Antanas Kavaliauskas	PF/C	Lithuania	Lietuvos rytas	
2017	Edgaras Ulanovas	SF	Lithuania	Žalgiris	
2018	Edgaras Ulanovas (2×)	SF	Lithuania	Žalgiris	
2019	Artsiom Parakhouski	C	Belarus	Rytas	
2020	Edgaras Ulanovas (3×)	SF	Lithuania	Žalgiris	
2021	Joffrey Lauvergne	C	France	Žalgiris	
2022	Joffrey Lauvergne (2×)	C	France	Žalgiris	
2023	Edgaras Ulanovas (4×)	F	Lithuania	Žalgiris	
2024	Laurynas Birutis	C	Lithuania	Žalgiris	
2025	Ignas Brazdeikis	SF	Lithuania	Žalgiris	
2026	Moses Wright	C	United States	Žalgiris	

== Awards won by nationality ==
Country	Total
Lithuania	7
France	2
Belarus	1
United States	1

== Awards won by club ==
Country	Total
Žalgiris	9
Lietuvos rytas / Rytas	2

== See also ==
- LKL
- LKL MVP
- LKL Finals
- LKL Finals MVP
- King Mindaugas Cup
- LKF Cup
