= Osvaldas Olisevičius =

Lithuanian basketball player

- Olisevičius with the Lithuania national team

No. 31 – Pallacanestro Cantù
- Position: Small forward / power forward
- League: LBA

Personal information
- Born: 10 January 1993 (age 33) Vilnius, Lithuania
- Listed height: 2.00 m (6 ft 7 in)
- Listed weight: 92 kg (203 lb)

Career information
- NBA draft: 2015: undrafted
- Playing career: 2010–present

Career history
- 2013–2014: Trakai
- 2014–2017: Pieno žvaigždės
- 2017: s.Oliver Würzburg
- 2018: Pieno žvaigždės
- 2018–2020: Neptūnas Klaipėda
- 2020–2021: Medi Bayreuth
- 2021–2023: Reggio Emilia
- 2023–2026: Universo Treviso
- 2026–present: Pallacanestro Cantù

Career highlights
- NKL Most Improved Player (2014); Baltic Basketball League champion (2018); KMT Three-Point Contest champion (2020)
Medals
Men's basketball
Representing Lithuania
FIBA Europe Under-16 Championship
Silver medal – second place	2009 Lithuania	National Team

Osvaldas Olisevičius (born 10 January 1993) is a Lithuanian professional basketball player for Pallacanestro Cantù of the Lega Basket Serie A (LBA). He can play both small forward and power forward positions.

== Professional career ==
=== Trakai (2013–2014) ===
In 2014 Olisevičius was chosen as NKL Most Improved Player, while playing for Trakai and averaging 12.9 points, 4.4 rebounds and 1.6 assists.

=== Pieno žvaigždės (2014–2017) ===
In 2014, he joined Pieno žvaigždės Pasvalys by signing a three-year deal.

=== s.Oliver Würzburg (2017–2018) ===
On 10 June 2017, Olisevičius signed with the German team s.Oliver Würzburg.

=== Return to Pieno žvaigždės (2018) ===
On 3 January 2018, Olisevičius returned to Pieno žvaigždės Pasvalys.

=== Neptūnas Klaipėda (2018–2020) ===
In 2020, Olisevičius won the 2020 King Mindaugas Cup Three-Point Contest, playing for Neptūnas Klaipėda. He averaged 10.1 points, 3.5 rebounds and 2.1 assists per game in the 2019–20 season.

=== Medi Bayreuth (2020–2021) ===
On 12 August 2020, Olisevičius signed with Medi Bayreuth of the Basketball Bundesliga.

=== Reggio Emilia (2021–2023) ===
On 10 July 2021, Olisevičius signed with Reggio Emilia of the Italian Lega Basket Serie A. On 1 February 2022, he extended his contract with the team until 2024.

=== Universo Treviso (2023–2026) ===
On 21 November 2023, he signed with Universo Treviso of the Lega Basket Serie A.

=== Pallacanestro Cantù (2026–present) ===
On 13 October 2026, Olisevičius signed with Pallacanestro Cantù of the Italian Lega Basket Serie A.

== International career ==
Olisevičius won silver medal while representing the Lithuanian U-16 National Team during the 2009 FIBA Europe Under-16 Championship.

== Career statistics ==
Legend
GP	Games played	GS	Games started	MPG	Minutes per game
FG%	Field goal percentage	3P%	3-point field goal percentage	FT%	Free throw percentage
RPG	Rebounds per game	APG	Assists per game	SPG	Steals per game
BPG	Blocks per game	PPG	Points per game	**Bold**	Career high

=== Basketball Champions League ===
Year	Team	GP	GS	MPG	FG%	3P%	FT%	RPG	APG	SPG	BPG	PPG
2018–19	Neptūnas Klaipėda	**16**	**6**	21.6	.462	.283	.750	**3.3**	1.0	.8	.1	8.7
2019–20	Neptūnas Klaipėda	14	**6**	20.3	**.467**	**.420**	.824	3.1	1.2	**1.1**	.2	8.6
2022–23	Reggio Emilia	5	4	**24.4**	.405	.269	**.833**	2.8	**1.4**	.8	**.4**	**10.2**
Career		35	16	20.5	.573	.347	.796	3.2	1.3	.1	.2	9.2

=== Domestic leagues ===
Year	Team	League	GP	MPG	FG%	3P%	FT%	RPG	APG	SPG	BPG	PPG
2014–15	(Lithuania) Pieno žvaigždės	LKL	41	23.2	.461	.308	.769	3.6	1.2	.8	.2	6.6
2015–16	(Lithuania) Pieno žvaigždės	LKL	37	19.1	.426	.379	.800	2.9	.7	.5	.0	5.4
2016–17	(Lithuania) Pieno žvaigždės	LKL	38	25.6	.480	.364	.706	5.0	2.4	.7	.2	12.5
2017–18	(Germany) Würzburg Baskets	BBL	10	9.9	.529	.500	.500	1.6	.4	.1	.3	4.6
2017–18	(Lithuania) Pieno žvaigždės	LKL	23	26.4	.442	.326	.740	4.1	1.8	1.1	.3	11.4
2018–19	(Lithuania) Neptūnas Klaipėda	LKL	44	19.7	.486	.294	.781	3.6	1.6	.8	.2	8.9
2019–20	(Lithuania) Neptūnas Klaipėda	LKL	24	22.4	.543	.463	.815	3.5	2.0	.7	.2	10.1
2020–21	(Germany) Medi Bayreuth	BBL	34	24.7	.547	.410	.821	3.3	2.0	1.0	.1	13.9
2021–22	(Italy) Reggio Emilia	LBA	19	29.2	.461	.357	.885	4.6	1.5	1.0	.1	16.2
2022–23	(Italy) Reggio Emilia	LBA	29	24.9	.430	.296	.800	3.9	1.4	1.0	.1	11.6
2023–24	(Italy) Universo Treviso	LBA	21	31.4	.436	.402	.814	5.5	2.9	.7	.0	15.6
2024–25	(Italy) Universo Treviso	LBA	25	30.2	.462	.412	.894	4.2	2.2	.8	.1	16.8
2025–26	(Italy) Universo Treviso	LBA	14	27.4	.390	.380	.837	4.4	1.2	.7	.2	13.5
