= Edgaras Ulanovas =

Lithuanian basketball player (born 1992)

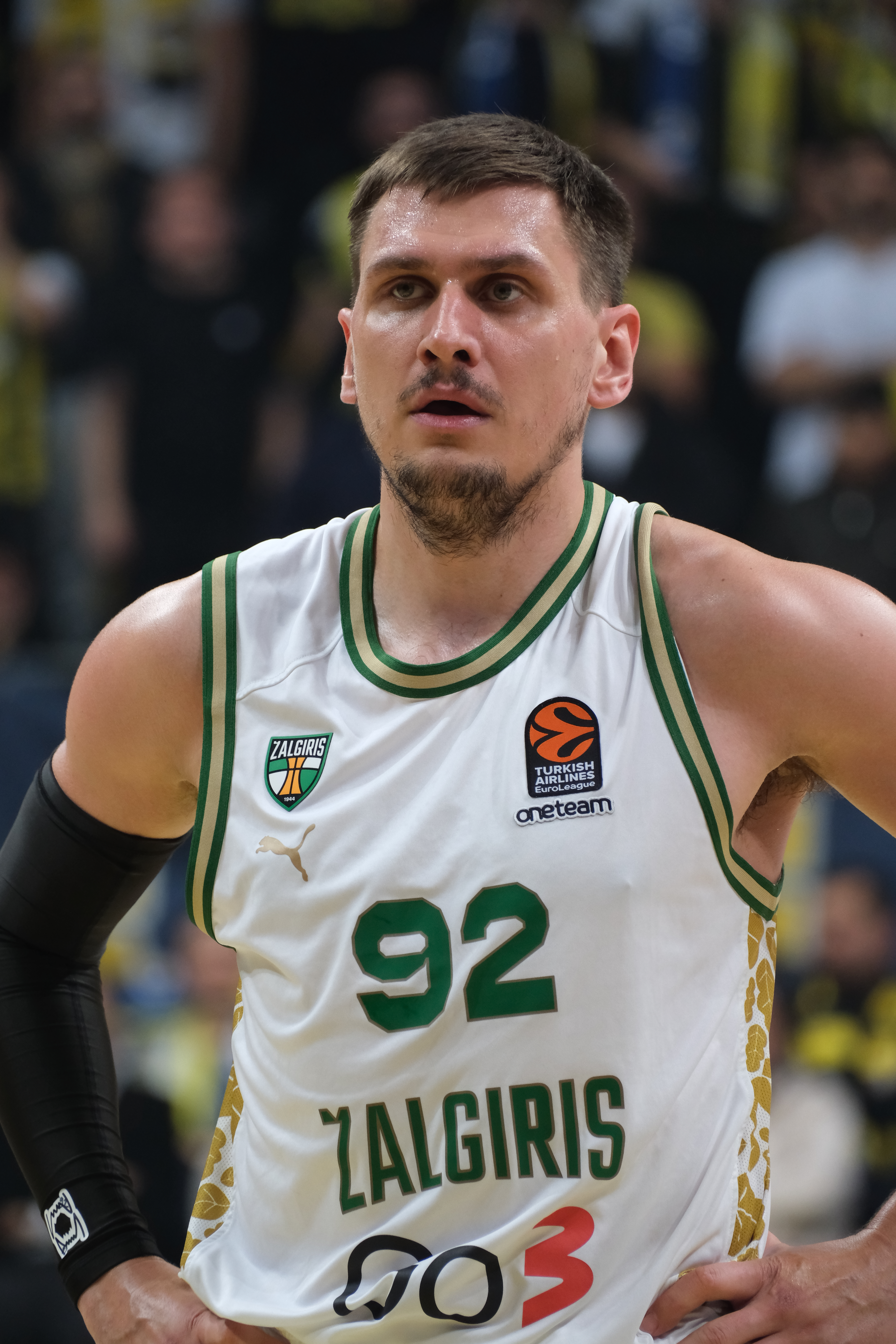
- Ulanovas with Žalgiris Kaunas in 2025

No. 92 – Žalgiris Kaunas
- Position: Small forward / power forward
- League: LKL; EuroLeague

Personal information
- Born: January 7, 1992 (age 34) Kaunas, Lithuania
- Listed height: 2.03 m (6 ft 8 in)
- Listed weight: 99 kg (218 lb)

Career information
- NBA draft: 2014: undrafted
- Playing career: 2009–present

Career history
- 2008–2009: Aiščiai-Artransa Kaunas
- 2009–2010: Triobet Jonava
- 2010–2020: Žalgiris Kaunas
- 2010–2011: →BC Žalgiris-2
- 2011–2012: →Baltai Kaunas
- 2012: →Pieno žvaigdžės
- 2012–2013: →Lietkabelis
- 2013–2014: →Neptūnas
- 2020–2021: Fenerbahçe
- 2021–present: Žalgiris Kaunas

Career highlights
- 9× LKL champion (2015–2020, 2023, 2025, 2026); 8× King Mindaugas Cup winner (2017, 2018, 2020, 2022–2026); 4× King Mindaugas Cup MVP (2017, 2018, 2020, 2023); 2× LKL Finals MVP (2017, 2019); 2× All-LKL Team (2016, 2019); LKL Most Improved Player (2016); LKF Cup winner (2015); LKF Cup Finals MVP (2015); LKL All-Star (2015); VTB United League Young Player of the Year (2014)
Medals
Men's basketball
Representing Lithuania
FIBA Europe Under-20 Championship
Gold medal – first place	2012 Slovenia	U-20 Team
FIBA World Under-19 Championship
Gold medal – first place	2011 Latvia	U-19 Team
FIBA Europe Under-18 Championship
Gold medal – first place	2010 Lithuania	U-18 Team
FIBA Europe Under-16 Championship
Gold medal – first place	2008 Italy	U-16 Team

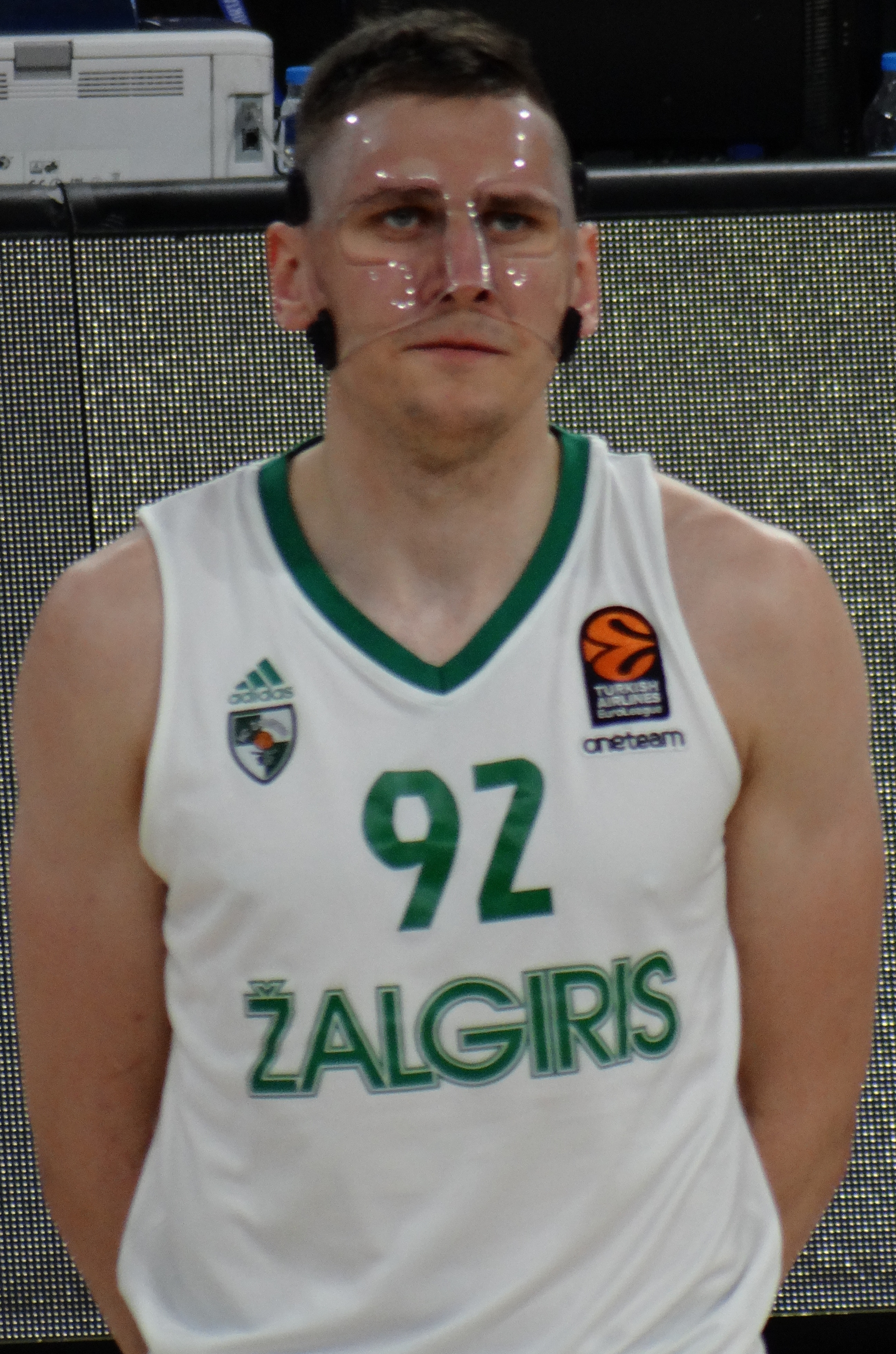
Ulanovas with Žalgiris Kaunas in 2018

Edgaras Ulanovas (born January 7, 1992) is a Lithuanian professional basketball player and the team captain for Žalgiris Kaunas of the Lithuanian Basketball League (LKL) and the EuroLeague.

== Professional career ==
On 25 April 2014, Ulanovas was named the Co-VTB United League Young Player of the Year, along with Dmitry Kulagin. In 2017, he was named the MVP of the 2017 King Mindaugas Cup, and also the MVP of the 2017 LKL Finals.

In 2019, Ulanovas was named the LKL Finals MVP for a second time in his career.

In 2020, Ulanovas was named MVP of the 2020 King Mindaugas Cup.

On 9 July 2020, Ulanovas transferred to the Turkish EuroLeague powerhouse Fenerbahçe, after a full decade with Žalgiris. During his first game as a member of the new team in the EuroLeague, Ulanovas was one of the team leaders by scoring 13 points, and helped his team to achieve a 77–63 season opening victory versus the KK Crvena zvezda. On 15 June 2021, Ulanovas officially parted ways with the Turkish club.

On 2 July 2021, Ulanovas returned to Žalgiris Kaunas, signing a one-year deal. On 10 April 2022, he re-signed with the club until the end of the 2023–24 season. On 26 September 2022, Ulanovas was named team captain of Žalgiris Kaunas. On July 5, 2023, he renewed his contract through 2027.

== National team career ==
=== Lithuanian junior national team ===
Ulanovas represented Lithuania's junior national teams at the 2008 FIBA Europe Under-16 Championship, the 2010 FIBA Europe Under-18 Championship, the 2011 FIBA Under-19 World Cup, and the 2012 FIBA Europe Under-20 Championship, winning four gold medals. In the 2012 FIBA Europe Under-20 Championship, he was named to the All-Tournament Team.

=== Lithuanian senior national team ===
In 2015, Ulanovas was included into the senior Lithuanian national team's extended candidates list, by the team's head coach, Jonas Kazlauskas. However, he was not invited into the team's training camp later on. Still, he was invited into the national team's training camp the next year, and he immediately qualified into the Olympic roster.

However, he was replaced on the roster by Vaidas Kariniauskas, just before the start of the tournament, due to injury. Following year, Ulanovas played with the team at the EuroBasket 2017, averaging 7.2 points.

== Personal life ==
On 26 June 2021 Ulanovas bought 15% shares of basketball website "Basketnews.com" and became part-owner.

== Career statistics ==
Legend
GP	Games played	GS	Games started	MPG	Minutes per game
FG%	Field-goal percentage	3P%	3-point field-goal percentage	FT%	Free-throw percentage
RPG	Rebounds per game	APG	Assists per game	SPG	Steals per game
BPG	Blocks per game	PPG	Points per game	PIR	Performance index rating
**Bold**	Career high

=== EuroLeague ===
*	Led the league

Year	Team	GP	GS	MPG	FG%	3P%	FT%	RPG	APG	SPG	BPG	PPG	PIR
2014–15	Žalgiris	24	12	19.2	.465	.323	.757	2.5	1.2	.6	.0	5.5	5.9
2015–16	Žalgiris	24	24	26.3	.372	.342	.875	**4.5**	2.0	.7	.2	6.3	9.2
2016–17	Žalgiris	30	16	24.4	**.510**	.381	**.877**	3.3	1.5	.3	.3	7.7	9.3
2017–18	Žalgiris	35	31	27.1	.503	**.457**	.787	4.1	2.1	.5	**.4**	7.5	10.9
2018–19	Žalgiris	34	24	25.0	.439	.354	.840	3.4	1.4	.6	.2	7.2	8.6
2019–20	Žalgiris	28*	28*	25.8	.427	.368	.813	3.3	2.0	.4	.1	8.3	8.9
2020–21	Fenerbahçe	28	28	19.6	.471	.400	.722	1.6	1.4	.3	.0	4.5	4.9
2021–22	Žalgiris	32	24	27.5	.441	.347	.789	4.3	2.0	.8	.2	8.1	11.2
2022–23	Žalgiris	**37**	**37**	**28.1**	.449	.395	.835	3.3	2.5	**.9**	.1	**10.2**	**11.7**
2023–24	Žalgiris	34	32	28.0	.448	.284	.866	4.1	**2.8**	.6	.1	7.6	10.7
2024–25	Žalgiris	34	16	22.3	.481	.393	.831	2.9	1.8	.5	.1	6.6	8.2
Career		340	272	25.1	.490	.366	.826	3.4	1.9	.6	.2	7.3	9.3
