= Lukas Lekavičius =

Lithuanian basketball player

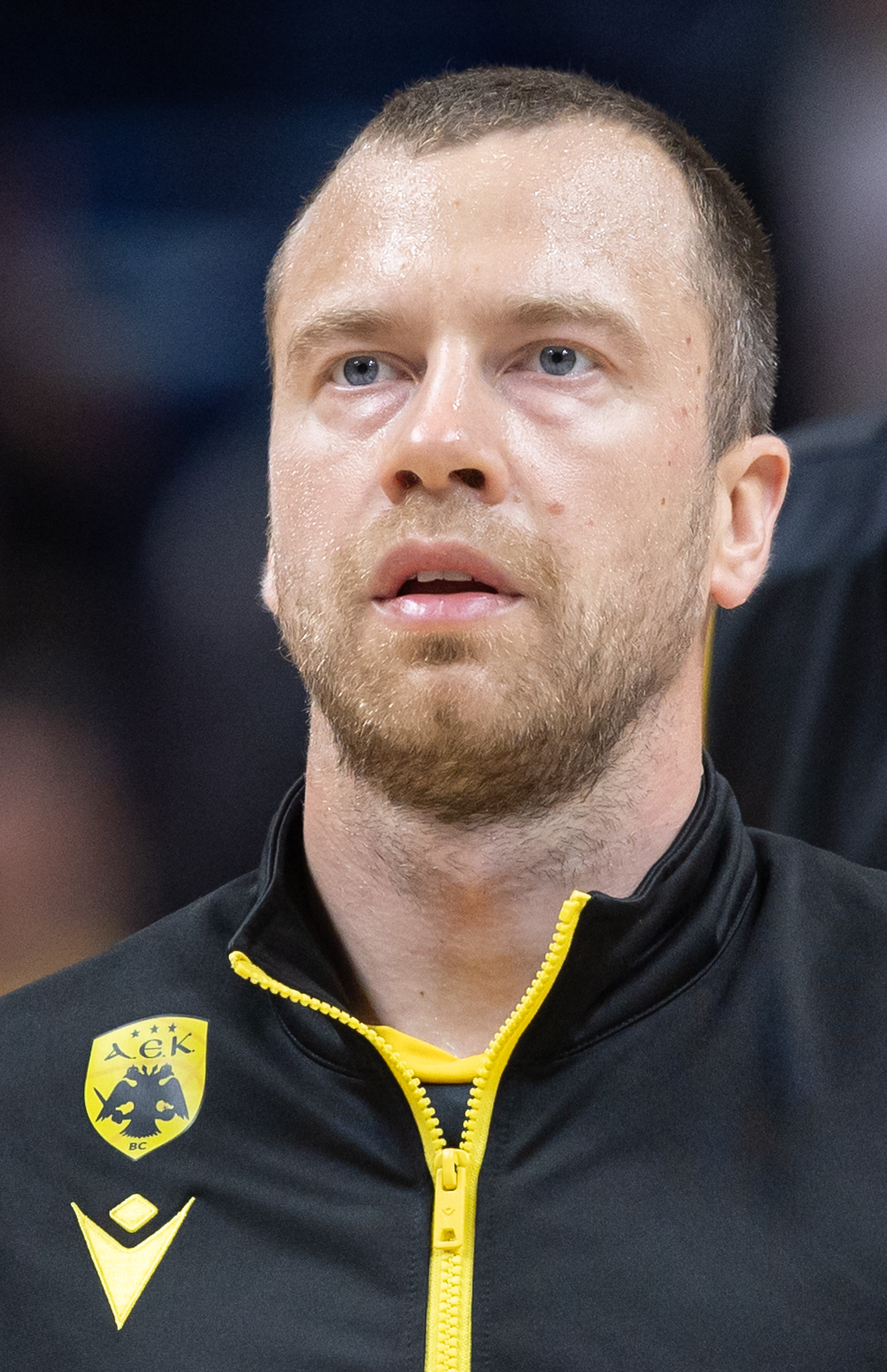
- Lekavičius with AEK B.C. in 2026

No. 9 – AEK Athens
- Position: Point guard
- League: Greek Basket League

Personal information
- Born: March 30, 1994 (age 32) Šilalė, Lithuania
- Listed height: 5 ft 11 in (1.80 m)
- Listed weight: 172 lb (78 kg)

Career information
- NBA draft: 2016: undrafted
- Playing career: 2012–present

Career history
- 2012–2017: Žalgiris Kaunas
- 2012–2014: →Žalgiris-2 Kaunas
- 2017–2019: Panathinaikos
- 2019–2025: Žalgiris Kaunas
- 2025–present: AEK Athens

Career highlights
- 2× Greek Basket League champion (2018, 2019); Greek Basketball Cup winner (2019); 6× LKL champion (2015–2017, 2020, 2021, 2023, 2025); 2× All-LKL Team (2017, 2022); 7× King Mindaugas Cup winner (2017, 2020–2025); LKL Best Young Player (2015); LKF Cup winner (2015); LKL All-Star (2015)
Medals
Men's basketball
Representing Lithuania
EuroBasket
Silver medal – second place	2015 France–Croatia–Germany–Latvia
FIBA World U-19 Cup
Bronze medal – third place	2013 Czech Republic	Under-19
FIBA European U-18 Championship
Silver medal – second place	2012 Vilnius/Liepaja	Under-18
FIBA European U-16 Championship
Silver medal – second place	2010 Montenegro	Under-16

Lukas Lekavičius (born March 30, 1994) is a Lithuanian professional basketball player for AEK Athens of the Greek Basket League. Standing at 1.80 m (5 ft 11 in), he plays the point guard position. He was named to the LKL All-Tournament Team in 2017.

== Professional career ==
After spending his whole career in the Žalgiris Kaunas system, helping Žalgiris dominate the LKL scene, Lekavičius joined Panathinaikos, on a two-year contract, in 2017. He was personally chosen by the Panathinaikos head coach, Xavi Pascual, who had previously observed Lekavičius playing for a couple of years. Lekavičius chose the number 19 for his Panathinaikos jersey, which was previously used in the same club by Lithuanian players Robertas Javtokas, Ramūnas Šiškauskas, Jonas Mačiulis and Lekavičius' former coach Šarūnas Jasikevičius.

After spending two years in Greece, Lekavičius returned to Lithuania and signed with Žalgiris on a two-year (1+1) deal on 17 June 2019. He averaged 10.5 points and 2.8 assists per game. He re-signed with the club on 8 July 2020.

On September 1, 2025, Lekavičius signed with Greek club AEK Athens. On August 16, 2026, he renewed his contract with AEK for 2 more years.

== National team career ==
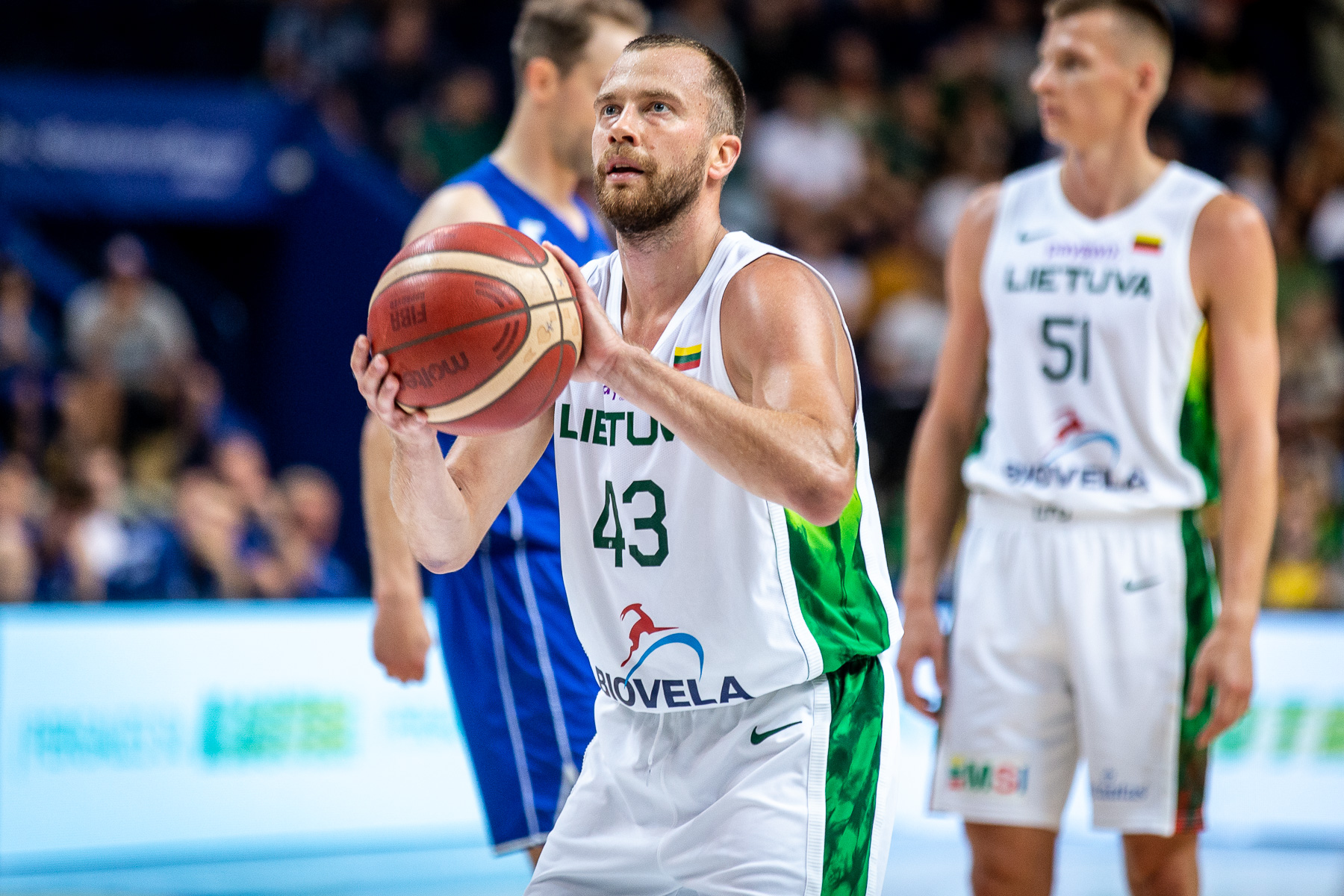
Lekavičius playing for the senior Lithuania men's national team in 2022

Lekavičius had notable performances with the Lithuania youth national teams, winning two European silver medals, and the world bronze medal in 2013. In 2015, Lekavičius was included into the senior Lithuania men's national basketball team candidates list, by the team's head coach, Jonas Kazlauskas. He was also invited to the team's training camp, and he then made it onto the main national team that competed at the EuroBasket 2015, where he won a silver medal. In 2017, just before the start of the EuroBasket 2017 championship, Lekavičius suffered a foot injury that ultimately sidelined him for two months, and was replaced in the final 12-man squad by Adas Juškevičius.

In 2019, Lekavičius represented Lithuania in the 2019 FIBA Basketball World Cup. Despite the team falling short of its goals, he was a crucial asset, providing scoring off the bench as the backup point guard. In five games played, he averaged 13.0 points, with 65% overall shooting, 1.8 assists, 1.0 steals and 13.4 point efficiency rating in just 17.7 minutes of playing time.

== Personal life ==
Lekavičius' has a couple of nicknames. His first nickname, Lightning McQueen (Žaibas Makvynas), was given to him by the Lithuanian TV broadcast commentator, and Lithuania national team staff representative, Linas Kunigėlis. His second nickname, Lithuanian Isaiah Thomas, was given to him by the Lithuanian sports media, because of his similarities to Isaiah Thomas' (Thomas' height is 5'9", and Lekavičius' height is 5'10". They are both left-handed, and at one time, both of their club team's main colors were green and white).

== Career statistics ==
Legend
GP	Games played	GS	Games started	MPG	Minutes per game
FG%	Field-goal percentage	3P%	3-point field-goal percentage	FT%	Free-throw percentage
RPG	Rebounds per game	APG	Assists per game	SPG	Steals per game
BPG	Blocks per game	PPG	Points per game	PIR	Performance index rating
**Bold**	Career high

=== EuroLeague ===
Year	Team	GP	GS	MPG	FG%	3P%	FT%	RPG	APG	SPG	BPG	PPG	PIR
2014–15	Žalgiris	24	**7**	19.0	.417	.333	.778	1.8	2.7	.4	.0	5.5	5.1
2015–16	Žalgiris	21	3	14.3	.418	**.516**	.737	1.1	1.3	**.9**	—	4.6	3.4
2016–17	Žalgiris	30	0	18.1	.448	.338	.759	**1.9**	3.5	.6	.0	8.5	8.8
2017–18	Panathinaikos	31	3	12.7	.473	.486	.895	1.0	1.5	.2	—	3.9	4.5
2018–19	Panathinaikos	**33**	0	10.8	.423	.405	.786	.8	1.3	.3	.0	4.0	3.9
2019–20	Žalgiris	27	3	19.9	.535	.392	.862	1.3	2.8	.5	.0	**10.5**	10.2
2020–21	Žalgiris	**33**	0	18.3	**.550**	.500	.864	1.2	2.4	.5	—	8.2	8.3
2021–22	Žalgiris	32	5	**23.7**	.439	.431	.878	1.3	**4.2**	.7	—	10.2	**10.9**
2022–23	Žalgiris	32	4	15.9	.469	.388	**.918**	1.1	1.5	.3	**.1**	6.9	6.2
2023–24	Žalgiris	30	1	12.1	.372	.396	.857	.8	1.6	.3	—	4.9	3.7
Career		293	26	16.5	.461	.396	.843	1.2	2.3	.5	.0	6.8	6.6
