= Vytenis Lipkevičius =

Lithuanian professional basketball player

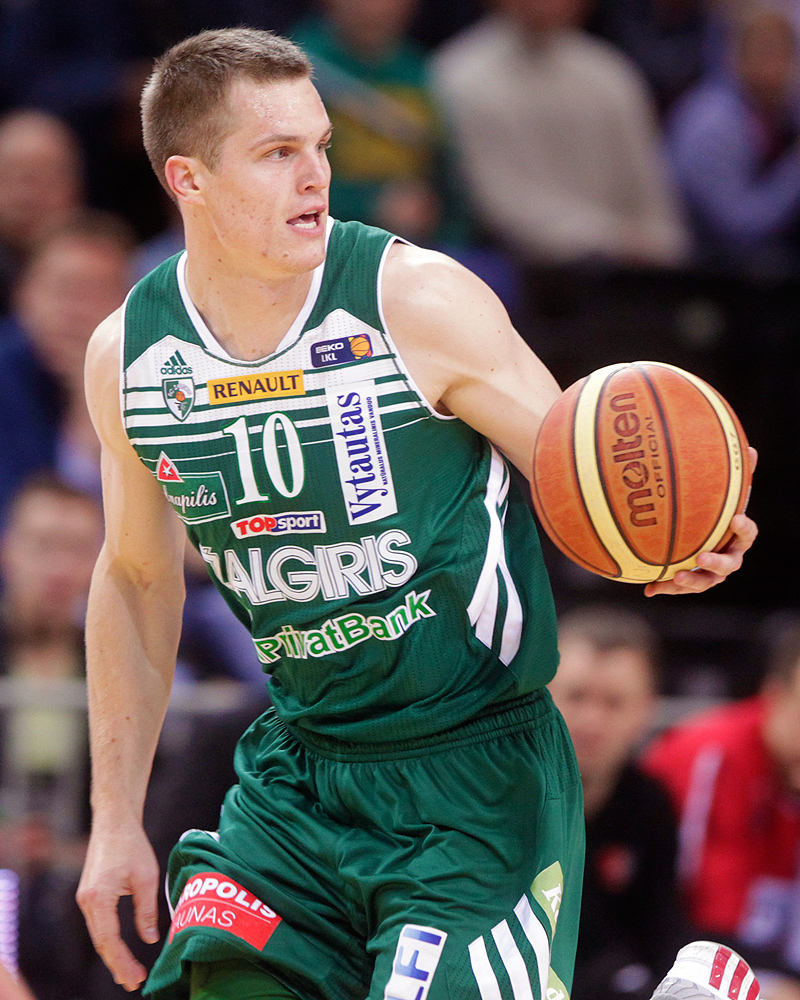
- Lipkevičius with Žalgiris Kaunas in 2014

KK Jurbarkas-Karys
- Position: Small forward / Power forward
- League: NKL

Personal information
- Born: May 19, 1989 (age 37) Vilkija, Lithuania
- Listed height: 1.98 m (6 ft 6 in)
- Listed weight: 98 kg (216 lb)

Career information
- NBA draft: 2011: undrafted
- Playing career: 2006–present

Career history
- 2006–2016: Žalgiris Kaunas
- 2006–2008: →Žalgiris-Arvydas Sabonis school
- 2008–2009: →Triobet Kaunas
- 2009–2010: →Aiščiai Kaunas
- 2010–2011: →Rūdupis Prienai
- 2011: →Baltai Kaunas
- 2016–2017: Vytautas Prienai-Birštonas
- 2017–2018: s.Oliver Würzburg
- 2018–2026: Lietkabelis Panevėžys
- 2018–2019: →SkyCop Prienai
- 2026–present: Jurbarkas-Karys

Career highlights
- LKL Best Defender (2022); 6× LKL champion (2011–2016); 3x BBL champion (2011, 2012, 2017); 2x LKF Cup winner (2012, 2015)
Medals
Men's basketball
Representing Lithuania
FIBA Europe Under-20 Championship
Silver medal – second place	2008 Latvia	National Team

Vytenis Lipkevičius (born May 19, 1989) is a Lithuanian professional basketball player for Jurbarkas-Karys of the National Basketball League (NKL). Standing at 1.98 m (6 ft 6 in), he primarily plays at the small forward position.

== Professional career ==
On 11 August 2010, Lipkevičius joined Rūdupis Prienai of the LKL, after being loaned by Žalgiris Kaunas. For the 2011–12 season, he went on loan to Baltai Kaunas. On 28 October 2011, Lipkevičius was brought back from his loan by Žalgiris. On 24 July 2013, Lipkevičius re-signed with the club until the end of the 2015–16 season. On 20 July 2015, he signed a new two-year contract with Žalgiris. On 12 September 2016, Lipkevičius mutually parted ways with the club and subsequently joined Vytautas Prienai-Birštonas.

On 10 June 2017, Lipkevičius signed a one-year deal with s.Oliver Würzburg of the German Basketball Bundesliga.

On 12 July 2018, Lipkevičius signed a two-year contract with Lietkabelis Panevėžys of the Lithuanian Basketball League (LKL). On 6 November, he was loaned to Skycop Prienai for the remainder of the season. On 2 July 2022, he re-signed with Lietkabelis until 2024.

== Career statistics ==
Legend
GP	Games played	GS	Games started	MPG	Minutes per game
FG%	Field-goal percentage	3P%	3-point field-goal percentage	FT%	Free-throw percentage
RPG	Rebounds per game	APG	Assists per game	SPG	Steals per game
BPG	Blocks per game	PPG	Points per game	PIR	Performance index rating
**Bold**	Career high

=== EuroLeague ===
Year	Team	GP	GS	MPG	FG%	3P%	FT%	RPG	APG	SPG	BPG	PPG	PIR
2011–12	Žalgiris Kaunas	12	7	8.6	.333	.333	**1**	1.3	.5	.4	.0	.8	1.4
2012–13	Žalgiris Kaunas	14	0	9.8	.348	.250	.417	1.1	.1	.2	**.1**	1.6	.7
2013–14	Žalgiris Kaunas	**23**	**22**	**21.1**	.438	.440	.839	**2.6**	.7	.4	.0	**4.7**	**4.7**
2014–15	Žalgiris Kaunas	14	2	7.2	**.600**	**.600**	.600	1.2	**.9**	.4	.0	2.1	2.8
2015–16	Žalgiris Kaunas	1	0	5.5	.333	.000	.000	2.0	.0	.0	.0	2.0	1.0
Career		64	31	13.0	.435	.405	.714	1.7	.6	.4	.0	2.7	2.7

=== EuroCup ===
Year	Team	GP	GS	MPG	FG%	3P%	FT%	RPG	APG	SPG	BPG	PPG	PIR
2020–21	Lietkabelis Panevėžys	10	9	25.7	.419	.308	.714	4.7	1.3	**2.0**	.0	5.4	10.2
2021–22	Lietkabelis Panevėžys	18	13	**29.4**	.459	.391	**.915**	4.7	2.1	1.0	.0	**9.6**	13.2
2022–23	Lietkabelis Panevėžys	**19**	11	27.8	.423	.301	.868	4.9	2.1	.8	.0	8.2	12.2
2023–24	Lietkabelis Panevėžys	15	13	28.2	**.475**	.358	.878	4.9	**2.7**	1.3	.1	8.7	**13.6**
2024–25	Lietkabelis Panevėžys	15	3	21.4	.351	.294	.769	2.8	1.2	1.1	.1	5.8	6.5
2025–26	Lietkabelis Panevėžys	7	1	16.2	.474	**.538**	.900	2.4	1.1	.6	.0	4.9	5.7
Career		84	50	25.9	.432	.344	.859	4.2	1.9	1.1	.0	7.5	10.9
