= King Mindaugas Cup =

Lithuanian basketball cup

Karaliaus Mindaugo taurė
- Sport: Basketball
- First season: 2016
- No. of teams: 11
- Country: Lithuania
- Confederation: FIBA Europe
- Most recent champion: Žalgiris (9th title)
- Most titles: Žalgiris (9 titles)
- Broadcaster: LRT
- Related competitions: LKL
- Website: Link
- 2026–27 season

Karaliaus Mindaugo taurė (English: King Mindaugas Cup) is an annual national domestic basketball cup competition between Lithuanian professional teams. It is organised by the Lithuanian Basketball League (Lietuvos krepšinio lyga – LKL). The tournament is named in honor of Mindaugas, the first and only crowned King of Lithuania.

The Final four event includes an annual LKL Three-point Shootout contest, LKL Future Cup was introduced in 2018 with Žalgiris and Rytas youth teams competing for the cup. LKL Slam Dunk Contest was part of the Final four program until the event was removed in 2019.

== History and format ==
The new tournament was presented to public on 1 December 2015, to replace the LKF Cup and the LKL All-Star Day.

In 2016 the official name was Kidy Tour King Mindaugas Cup for sponsorship purposes, where Top 8 teams after 2 rounds in the Lithuanian basketball league competed in a 3-day tournament, in Vilnius, Siemens Arena. The format was where top team after 2 LKL rounds faced 8th team in the quarterfinals, second placed team faced 7th team and so on. Lietuvos Rytas 67-57 beat Žalgiris in the final.

In 2017 Kidy Tour King Mindaugas Cup there was a slight change in the format, seeds where divided between 1-4 and 5-8 and a quarterfinal draw was introduced. Also, instead of a 3-day tournament, a Final four format was introduced where semi-finals and finals where played over the weekend. The first final four was held in Kaunas, where Žalgiris beat Lietkabelis 84–63 in the final.

The official name of King Mindaugas Cup in 2018 changed to SIL King Mindaugas Cup due to sponsorship reasons. Pairing format was kept the same, seeds were divided into 1-4 and 5-8 seeds, and the quarterfinal matches were played at the higher seed's home court. Final four was held in Klaipėda, where Žalgiris 81-62 beat Lietuvos Rytas.

In the summer of 2018 it was announced about the expansion of the tournament. Teams from lower division league NKL were introduced and the tournament started in October 2018. The official name of King Mindaugas Cup changed back to Kidy Tour King Mindaugas Cup. The 2018-2019 tournament included 10 LKL clubs and 4 clubs from the NKL league. They competed in a four-round tournament. Top 6 LKL teams received automatic placements into the quarterfinals round and the bottom 4 teams had to compete against the 4 NKL clubs. For the first-time home and away matches were played in the quarterfinals round. The final four was held in Vilnius for the second time, where Rytas 70-67 beat Žalgiris in the final.

In the summer of 2019 it was decided to change the format again, introducing two more clubs from the NKL, expanding the total number of teams to 16. 4 round system is kept the same, where bottom 6 LKL teams will be seeded versus the unseeded NKL clubs. Out of the 6 winners in the first round 2 teams that had the best record in their league last year will receive an automatic placement into the quarterfinals round, the other 4 teams will be paired and will play home and away games for the 2 remaining spots in the quarterfinals round. In the quarterfinals round teams that placed 1 to 4 last year will be seeded against teams that made their way through the second round. Final four will be held on the 15-16 of February, location is yet to be decided.

In 2021 the official name was Citadele King Mindaugas Cup for sponsorship purposes. The 2021 tournament included 10 LKL clubs and 6 clubs from the NKL league. They competed in a two-round tournament. Top 4 LKL teams received automatic placements into the quarterfinals round and the 6 bottom LKL teams had to compete against 6 NKL clubs. The final four took place on the 13-14 of February and was held in Panevėžys for the first time. In the final Žalgiris 78–69 beat Lietkabelis and defended its title.

The 2022 Citadele King Mindaugas Cup tournament was announced to be held in Vilnius and the newly renamed Avia Solutions Group Arena. In the quarterfinal stages Žalgiris, Rytas, Lietkabelis and Šiauliai-7bet prevailed to the semifinals. In the semifinals, Žalgiris beat Šiauliai-7bet 80-68 and Lietkabelis upset Rytas by beating them 82-80 in their home arena. Rytas beat Šiauliai-7bet 76-71 in the third place game and Žalgiris destroyed an undermanned Lietkabelis side 91-66 in the final to claim their 5th and 3rd straight King Mindaugas Cup title.

The 2023 edition was eerily similar. Rytas, Lietkabelis and Žalgiris all advanced to the semifinals, and together with them came debutants CBet Jonava. Rytas once again shockingly fell in the semifinals to CBet 86-92. On the other hand, Žalgiris left no other surprises and took care of Lietkabelis 77-67. The third place game saw two disappointed sides clash against each other, with Lietkabelis coming on top against Rytas 91-88. Žalgiris claimed their 6th and 4th straight Cup by beating CBet 81-77. Edgaras Ulanovas was named Final Four MVP.

== Winners ==
Year	Champion	Score	Runner-up	Third place	Score	Fourth place	City	Venue	MVP
2016	Rytas	67–57	Žalgiris	Neptūnas	88–51	Prienai	Vilnius	Siemens Arena	(Lithuania) Antanas Kavaliauskas
2017	Žalgiris	84–63	Lietkabelis	Juventus	70–61	Prienai	Kaunas	Žalgiris Arena	(Lithuania) Edgaras Ulanovas
2018	Žalgiris	81–62	Rytas	Lietkabelis	81–78	Dzūkija	Klaipėda	Švyturys Arena	(Lithuania) Edgaras Ulanovas
2018–19	Rytas	70–67	Žalgiris	Lietkabelis	94–67	Neptūnas	Vilnius	Siemens Arena	(Belarus) Artsiom Parakhouski
2019–20	Žalgiris	80–60	Rytas	Lietkabelis	84–73	Neptūnas	Klaipėda	Švyturys Arena	(Lithuania) Edgaras Ulanovas
2020–21	Žalgiris	76–69	Lietkabelis	Juventus	86–69	Neptūnas	Panevėžys	Cido Arena	(France) Joffrey Lauvergne
2021–22	Žalgiris	91–66	Lietkabelis	Rytas	76–71	Šiauliai	Vilnius	Avia Solutions Group Arena	(France) Joffrey Lauvergne
2022–23	Žalgiris	81–77	Jonava	Lietkabelis	91–88	Rytas	Šiauliai	Šiauliai Arena	(Lithuania) Edgaras Ulanovas
2023–24	Žalgiris	86–70	Lietkabelis	Rytas	94–89	Šiauliai	Kaunas	Žalgiris Arena	(Lithuania) Laurynas Birutis
2024–25	Žalgiris	91–89	Neptūnas	7bet–Lietkabelis	100–91	Wolves Twinsbet	Vilnius	Twinsbet Arena	(Lithuania) Ignas Brazdeikis
2025–26	Žalgiris	101–85	Rytas	Lietkabelis	94–73	Neptūnas	Šiauliai	Šiauliai Arena	(United States) Moses Wright

== Performance by club ==
Teams shown in italics are no longer in existence.

Club	Winners	Runners-up	Third place	Seasons Winners	Seasons Runners-up	Seasons Third place
Žalgiris	9	2	–	2017, 2018, 2020, 2021, 2022, 2023, 2024, 2025, 2026	2016, 2019	–
Rytas	2	3	2	2016, 2019	2018, 2020, 2026	2022, 2024
Lietkabelis	–	4	6	–	2017, 2021, 2022, 2024	2018, 2019, 2020, 2023, 2025, 2026
Neptūnas	–	1	1	–	2025	2016
Jonava	–	1	–	–	2023	
Juventus	–	–	2	–	–	2017, 2021

== Performers ==
Edition	Performers
2016	Leon Somov & Jazzu, Vaidas Baumila, Dee & Kamy, Jama&W
2017	Lilas ir Innomine, Golden Age, Rebelheart
2018	Beatrich, Monique, Petras Vyšniauskas & Vytautas Grubliauskas
2021	Freestarz
2023	Augustė Vedrickaitė

== See also ==
- LKL
- LKL MVP
- LKL Finals
- LKL Finals MVP
- King Mindaugas Cup MVP
- LKF Cup
- List of Lithuanian basketball league champions
- Basketball in Lithuania
