= 2014 Lithuania FIBA Basketball World Cup team =

This page tracks the progress of the Lithuanian national basketball team participating in the 2014 FIBA Basketball World Cup.

== Main roster ==
On May 13, head coach Jonas Kazlauskas announced both the extended 24–player main roster and the reserve roster for the national team. On July 1, he announced the condensed candidate roster consisting of 17 players. On August 11, he narrowed the list down to 14 players.

Lithuania men's national basketball team roster
Players
Coaches

Pos.	No.	Name	Age – Date of birth	Height	Club	Ctr.
C	14	Jonas Valančiūnas	22 – 6 May 1992	2.13 m (7 ft 0 in)	Toronto Raptors	(Canada)
C	7	Darjuš Lavrinovič	34 – 1 November 1979	2.12 m (6 ft 11 in)	Pallacanestro Reggiana	(Italy)
F/C	11	Donatas Motiejūnas	23 – 20 September 1990	2.13 m (7 ft 0 in)	Houston Rockets	(United States)
F/C	12	Kšyštof Lavrinovič	34 – 1 November 1979	2.10 m (6 ft 11 in)	Valencia BC	(Spain)
PF	13	Paulius Jankūnas (C)	30 – 29 April 1984	2.05 m (6 ft 9 in)	BC Žalgiris	(Lithuania)
SF	8	Jonas Mačiulis	29 – 10 February 1985	1.98 m (6 ft 6 in)	Real Madrid Baloncesto	(Spain)
SF	91	Simas Jasaitis	32 – 26 March 1982	2.01 m (6 ft 7 in)	PBC Lokomotiv Kuban	(Russia)
SF	19	Mindaugas Kuzminskas	24 – 19 October 1989	2.06 m (6 ft 9 in)	Unicaja Málaga	(Spain)
G/F	4	Martynas Pocius	28 – 28 April 1986	1.96 m (6 ft 5 in)	Galatasaray Liv Hospital	(Turkey)
SG	10	Renaldas Seibutis	29 – 23 July 1985	1.98 m (6 ft 6 in)	Darüşşafaka S.K.	(Turkey)
G	18	Adas Juškevičius	25 – 3 January 1989	1.94 m (6 ft 4 in)	BC Lietuvos rytas	(Lithuania)
PG	25	Šarūnas Vasiliauskas	25 – 27 March 1989	1.88 m (6 ft 2 in)	Trefl Sopot	(Poland)

Head coach

- (Lithuania) Jonas Kazlauskas

Assistant coach(es)

- (Lithuania) Darius Maskoliūnas
- (Lithuania) Gintaras Krapikas

=== Candidates that did not make it to the final team ===
#	Position	Player	Year of birth	Club	Reason	Date announced
	Center	Robertas Javtokas	1980	(Lithuania) Žalgiris Kaunas	Needs time to recuperate	June 30
	Forward	Linas Kleiza	1985	(Italy) EA7 Emporio Armani Milano	Personal problems	July 1
	Guard	Martynas Gecevičius	1988	(Lithuania) Lietuvos rytas	Coaching decision	July 1
	Guard	Marius Grigonis	1994	(Spain) Peñas Huesca	Coaching decision	July 1
	Guard	Tomas Dimša	1994	(Lithuania) Žalgiris Kaunas	Coaching decision	July 1
	Forward	Domantas Sabonis	1996	(United States) Gonzaga Bulldogs	Coaching decision	July 1
	Center	Antanas Kavaliauskas	1984	(Lithuania) Lietuvos rytas Vilnius	Coaching decision	August 11
	Forward	Deividas Gailius	1988	(Lithuania) Neptūnas Klaipėda	Coaching decision	August 11
	Guard	Žygimantas Janavičius	1989	(Germany) Braunschweig Löwen	Coaching decision	August 11
	Center	Artūras Gudaitis	1993	(Lithuania) Žalgiris Kaunas	Coaching decision	August 26
	Guard	Adas Juškevičius*	1989	(Lithuania) Lietuvos rytas	Coaching decision	August 26
	Guard	Mantas Kalnietis	1986	(Russia) Lokomotiv Kuban	Clavicular dislocation	August 26

* – Juškevičius was recalled to the national team after Kalnietis' injury vs. Croatia.

=== Depth chart ===
Pos.	Starting 5	Bench 1	Bench 2
C	Jonas Valančiūnas	Darjuš Lavrinovič
PF	Donatas Motiejūnas	Kšyštof Lavrinovič	Paulius Jankūnas
SF	Jonas Mačiulis	Mindaugas Kuzminskas	Simas Jasaitis
SG	Renaldas Seibutis	Martynas Pocius
PG	Šarūnas Vasiliauskas	Adas Juškevičius

=== Preparation matches ===
26 July 2014
19:00 EEST

Report (media)

Lithuania	93–74	Latvia
Scoring by quarter: 27–10, 21–24, 22–21, 23–19
Pts: Gudaitis 15; Rebs: Gudaitis 8 Asts: Vasiliauskas 9		Pts: Šmits 13

Šiauliai Arena, Lithuania

28 July 2014
19:00 EEST

Report (media)

Lithuania	82–51	(Georgia (country)) Georgia
Scoring by quarter: 21–9, 25–22, 12–12, 24–8
Pts: Kuzminskas 15; Rebs: Motiejūnas, Gailius 6 Asts: Jankūnas 6		Pts: Shengelia 13

Cido Arena, Lithuania

30 July 2014
19:00 EEST

Report (media)

Lithuania	81–54	(Georgia (country)) Georgia
Scoring by quarter: 18–14, 15–12, 29–15, 19–13
Pts: D.Lavrinovič 17; Rebs: Motiejūnas 12; Asts: Vasiliauskas 5		Pts: Pachulia 18

Siemens Arena, Lithuania

4 August 2014
19:00 EEST

Report (media)

Lithuania	90–81	Finland
Scoring by quarter: 26–14, 20–24, 25–22, 19–21
Pts: Kuzminskas 12; Rebs: Mačiulis 7 Asts: Pocius 4		Pts: Koivisto, Lee 13

Helsinki, Finland

8 August 2014
19:00 EEST

Report (media)

Lithuania	70–54	Ukraine
Scoring by quarter: 23–19, 15–18, 22–13, 10–4
Pts: D.Lavrinovič 19; Rebs: Motiejūnas, D.Lavrinovič 7 Asts: Pocius, D.Lavrinovič 4		Pts: Gladyr, Jeter 11

Švyturys Arena, Lithuania

9 August 2014
19:00 EEST

Report (media)

Lithuania	83–66	Finland
Scoring by quarter: 13–18, 27–21, 29–16, 14–11
Pts: Valančiūnas 20; Rebs: Valančiūnas 11; Asts: Kalnietis 11		Pts: Lee 20

Švyturys Arena, Lithuania

11 August 2014
19:00 EEST

Report (media)

Lithuania	91–78	Australia
Scoring by quarter: 24–15, 31–27, 19–18, 17–18
Pts: Valančiūnas 19; Rebs: Valančiūnas 8 Asts: Kalnietis 7		Pts: Andersen 19

Švyturys Arena, Lithuania

16 August 2014
19:00 EEST

Report (media)

Lithuania	86–67	Greece
Scoring by quarter: 19–16, 20–19, 25–10, 22–22
Pts: Motiejūnas 18; Rebs: Motiejūnas 7 Asts: Kalnietis 5		Pts: Printezis 14

Žalgiris Arena, Lithuania

17 August 2014
19:00 EEST

Report (media)

Lithuania	85–79	New Zealand
Scoring by quarter: 18–23, 19–18, 18–17, 30–21
Pts: Valančiūnas 19; Rebs: Valančiūnas, Mačiulis 5 Asts: Kalnietis 6		Pts: Penney 26

Žalgiris Arena, Lithuania

18 August 2014
19:00 EEST

Report (media)

Lithuania	80–76	Slovenia
Scoring by quarter: 17–22, 19–20, 21–12, 23–22
Pts: Valančiūnas 14; Rebs: Jankūnas 9 Asts: Kalnietis 4		Pts: Zupan 18

Žalgiris Arena, Lithuania

21 August 2014
18:15 EEST

Report (media)

Brazil	61–64	Lithuania
Scoring by quarter: 22–18, 16–7, 14–21, 9–18
Pts: Hettsheimeir 14		Pts: Valančiūnas, Mačiulis 11; Rebs: Motiejūnas 8 Asts: Kalnietis 7

Arena Stožice, Slovenia

22 August 2014
18:15 EEST

Report (media)

Iran	67–80	Lithuania
Scoring by quarter: 11–21, 20–17, 18–18, 18–24
Pts: Nikkhah 15		Pts: Pocius 12; Rebs: Jankūnas 7 Asts: Juškevičius 3

Arena Stožice, Slovenia

23 August 2014
21:15 EEST

Report (media)

Slovenia	74–72	Lithuania
Scoring by quarter: 16–13, 26–22, 12–18, 20–19
Pts: Lorbek 18		Pts: Motiejūnas, Kalnietis, D.Lavrinovič 15; Rebs: D.Lavrinovič 9 Asts: Kalnietis 6

Arena Stožice, Slovenia

26 August 2014
20:00 EEST

Report (media)

Croatia	94–80	Lithuania
Scoring by quarter: 25–12, 22–26, 28–23, 19–19
Pts: Bogdanović 24		Pts: Mačiulis 20; Rebs: Pocius 5 Asts: Vasiliauskas 3

Dražen Petrović Basketball Hall, Croatia

=== Preliminary round ===
30 August 2014
19:00

Boxscore

Lithuania	87–74	Mexico
Scoring by quarter: 22:27, 23:14, 22:12, 20:21
Pts: Mačiulis 19; Rebs: Valančiūnas 5 Asts: Seibutis 5		Pts: Cruz 21; Rebs: Ayón 6 Asts: Cruz 4

Gran Canaria Arena, Las Palmas

31 August 2014
19:00

Boxscore

Lithuania	75–62	Angola
Scoring by quarter: 23:22, 15:13, 25:14, 12:13
Pts: Motiejūnas 12; Rebs: Valančiūnas 13; Asts: Seibutis 4		Pts: Mingas 14; Rebs: Mingas 9 Asts: Cipriano 3

Gran Canaria Arena, Las Palmas

2 September 2014
16:30

Boxscore

Lithuania	75–82	Australia
Scoring by quarter: 20:30, 8:17, 28:15, 19:20
Pts: Seibutis 21; Rebs: Valančiūnas 6 Asts: Seibutis 3		Pts: Ingles 18; Rebs: Baynes 6 Asts: Ingles 4

Gran Canaria Arena, Las Palmas

3 September 2014
19:00

Boxscore

Lithuania	79–49	South Korea
Scoring by quarter: 17:19, 22:10, 18:4, 22:16
Pts: Juškevičius 20; Rebs: Valančiūnas 8 Asts: Motiejūnas 5		Pts: Moon 15; Rebs: Oh 4 Asts: Kim 4

Gran Canaria Arena, Las Palmas

4 September 2014
20:30

Boxscore

Lithuania	67–64	Slovenia
Scoring by quarter: 22:24, 14:20, 19:18, 12:2
Pts: Valančiūnas 12; Rebs: D.Lavrinovič 8 Asts: Juškevičius 3		Pts: Lorbek 14; Rebs: Omić 8 Asts: Dragić 4

Gran Canaria Arena, Las Palmas

=== Knockout stage ===
7 September 2014
16:00

Boxscore

New Zealand	71–76	Lithuania
Scoring by quarter: 9–23, 17–13, 24–22, 21–18
Pts: C. Webster 26; Rebs: Vukona 10; Asts: Penney 3		Pts: Valančiūnas 22; Rebs: Valančiūnas 13; Asts: Seibutis 5

Palau Sant Jordi, Barcelona
Attendance: 7,783
Referees: Ilija Belošević (SRB), Alejandro Chiti (ARG), Ferdinand Pascual (PHI)

=== Quarterfinals ===
9 September 2014
17:00

Boxscore

Lithuania	73–61	Turkey
Scoring by quarter: 13–18, 20–10, 14–16, 26–17
Pts: Seibutis 19; Rebs: Valančiūnas 13; Asts: Seibutis, Pocius 3		Pts: Gönlüm 13; Rebs: Aşık 10; Asts: Preldžić 5

Palau Sant Jordi, Barcelona
Attendance: 9,752
Referees: Juan González (ESP), Stephen Seibel (CAN), Eddie Viator (FRA)

=== Semifinals ===
11 September 2014
21:00

Boxscore

United States	96–68	Lithuania
Scoring by quarter: 21–16, 22–19, 33–14, 20–19
Pts: Irving 18; Rebs: Gay 7 Asts: Irving 4		Pts: Valančiūnas, Kuzminskas 15; Rebs: Kuzminskas 9 Asts: Juškevičius, Seibutis 2

Palau Sant Jordi, Barcelona
Attendance: 15,070
Referees: José Reyes (MEX), Matej Boltauzer (SLO), Sreten Radović (CRO)

=== Third place playoff ===
13 September 2014
18:00

Boxscore

Lithuania	93–95	France
Scoring by quarter: 19–22, 23–21, 29–21, 22–31
Pts: Valančiūnas 25; Rebs: Valančiūnas 9 Asts: Seibutis 4		Pts: Batum 27; Rebs: Lauvergne 9 Asts: Diaw 4

Palacio de Deportes de la Comunidad de Madrid, Madrid
Attendance: 11,800
Referees: Steven Anderson (USA), Ilija Belošević (SRB), Juan González (ESP)

== Reserve roster ==
The main goal of the reserve roster is to prepare the team for participation in the 2015 Summer Universiade held in South Korea. Some candidates are listed in both the main roster and the reserve roster.

Lithuania reserve national basketball team roster
Players
Coaches

Pos.	No.	Name	Age – Date of birth	Height	Club	Ctr.
F	6	Tauras Jogėla	21 – 2 May 1993	2.03 m (6 ft 8 in)	BC Žalgiris	(Lithuania)
G	8	Adas Juškevičius	25 – 3 January 1989	1.94 m (6 ft 4 in)	Eisbären Bremerhaven	(Germany)
PG	10	Žygimantas Janavičius	25 – 20 February 1989	1.92 m (6 ft 4 in)	BC TonyBet	(Lithuania)
C	11	Evaldas Kairys	23 – 11 October 1990	2.07 m (6 ft 9 in)	BC Pieno žvaigždės	(Lithuania)
PG	12	Šarūnas Vasiliauskas	25 – 27 March 1989	1.88 m (6 ft 2 in)	Trefl Sopot	(Poland)
PG	13	Vytenis Čižauskas	21 – 16 September 1992	1.88 m (6 ft 2 in)	BC Žalgiris	(Lithuania)
G/F	19	Vaidas Kariniauskas	20 – 16 November 1993	1.98 m (6 ft 6 in)	BC Žalgiris	(Lithuania)
SF	22	Eimantas Bendžius	24 – 23 April 1990	2.03 m (6 ft 8 in)	BC Lietuvos rytas	(Lithuania)
SG	31	Rokas Giedraitis	22 – 16 August 1992	1.98 m (6 ft 6 in)	BC Šiauliai	(Lithuania)
G	44	Paulius Dambrauskas	22 – 16 December 1991	1.95 m (6 ft 5 in)	BC Dzūkija	(Lithuania)
C	49	Mindaugas Kupšas	23 – 9 April 1991	2.16 m (7 ft 1 in)	BC Žalgiris	(Lithuania)
G/F	92	Edgaras Ulanovas	22 – 7 January 1992	1.97 m (6 ft 6 in)	BC Žalgiris	(Lithuania)
F/C	--	Artūras Gudaitis	21 – 19 June 1993	2.08 m (6 ft 10 in)	BC Žalgiris	(Lithuania)

Head coach

- (Lithuania) Dainius Adomaitis

Assistant coach(es)

Legend

- Club – describes last
  club before the tournament
- Age – describes age
  August 30, 2014

=== Candidates that did not make it to the final team ===
#	Position	Player	Year of birth	Club	Reason	Date announced
	Center	Egidijus Mockevičius	1992	(United States) Evansville Purple Aces	NCAA rules	June 16
	Forward	Gilvydas Biruta	1991	(United States) Rhode Island Rams	NCAA rules	June 16
	Forward	Artūras Gudaitis	1993	(Lithuania) Žalgiris Kaunas	Back injury	June 18

=== Friendly matches ===
June 22, 2014

Boxscore

Lithuania	76–55	Slovenia U–20
Scoring by quarter: 16–20, 19–10, 22–12, 19–13

Slovenia

June 24, 2014

Boxscore

Lithuania	82–65	Slovenia Reserve Team
Scoring by quarter: 25–15, 21–19, 12–18, 24–13

Slovenia

June 29, 2014

Boxscore

Lithuania	86–71	Lithuania U–20
Scoring by quarter: 15–20, 29–19, 21–15, 21–17

Druskininkai, Lithuania

June 30, 2014

Lithuania	82–64	Lithuania U–20
Scoring by quarter: 24–10, 19–14, 17–21, 22–19

Druskininkai, Lithuania

=== Promoted to the Main roster ===
#	Position	Player	Year of birth	PPG	RPG	APG
8	G	Adas Juškevičius	1989	13.3	4.5	2.0
10	PG	Žygimantas Janavičius	1989	6.8	2.3	4.3
12	PG	Šarūnas Vasiliauskas	1989	5.3	2.0	5.0
---	F/C	Artūras Gudaitis	1993	0.0	0.0	0.0
