= 2016 King Mindaugas Cup =

2016 Karaliaus Mindaugo taurė

Tournament details
- Arena: Lietuvos rytas Arena; Siemens Arena; Vilnius; Vilnius, Lithuania
- Dates: 19–21 February 2016

Final positions
- Champions: Lietuvos rytas (1st title)
- Runners-up: Žalgiris
- Third place: Neptūnas

Awards and statistics
- MVP: (Lithuania) Antanas Kavaliauskas

The 2016 Karaliaus Mindaugo taurė, also known as KIDY Tour – Karaliaus Mindaugo taurė for sponsorship purposes, was the first edition of the newly formed Lithuanian King Mindaugas Cup. It's managed by the Lithuanian Basketball League and the Lithuanian Basketball Federation. The competition was held in Vilnius, in the Siemens Arena on February 19–21, 2016.

Lietuvos rytas won the inaugural tournament, defeating Žalgiris 67–57 in the final. Their captain Antanas Kavaliauskas was awarded as MVP of the tournament. Neptūnas took the third place after a victory against Vytautas.

== Performers ==
The event included Leon Somov & Jazzu, Vaidas Baumila, Dee & Kamy and Jama&W musical performances.

== Qualified teams ==
Eight best ranked 2015–16 LKL season teams qualified into the tournament.

Pos	Team	Pld	W	L	PF	PA	PD
1	Žalgiris Kaunas	25	23	2	2142	1682	+460
2	Lietuvos rytas Vilnius	25	20	5	2127	1830	+297
3	Neptūnas Klaipėda	25	13	12	1899	1823	+76
4	Vytautas Prienai-Birštonas	25	13	12	2019	1988	+31
5	Juventus Utena	25	12	13	1955	2059	−104
6	Lietkabelis Panevėžys	25	11	14	1850	1939	−89
7	Šiauliai	25	10	15	1923	1991	−68
8	Pieno žvaigždės Pasvalys	25	9	16	1917	2033	−116

Source: LKL

== Bracket ==
Quarterfinals; 19 February
Vytautas Prienai-Birštonas	88
Juventus Utena	86
Žalgiris	77
Nevėžis	64
Neptūnas	96
Šiauliai	58
Lietuvos rytas	88
Lietkabelis	82

Semifinals; 20 February
Vytautas Prienai-Birštonas	67
Žalgiris	90
Neptūnas	79
Lietuvos rytas	97

Final; 21 February
Žalgiris	57
Lietuvos rytas	67
Bronze final

== Quarterfinals ==
=== Vytautas Prienai-Birštonas vs. Juventus Utena ===
19 February 2016 Quarterfinal A	Vytautas Prienai-Birštonas	88–86	Juventus Utena	Vilnius
12:00 (EEST)	Scoring by quarter: 25–19, 27–18, 18–16, 18–33
	Pts: Vasiliauskas 21; Rebs: Šulskis 10; Asts: Kisielius 6	Boxscore	Pts: Butterfield 21; Rebs: Dimša 7 Asts: Alijevas 4	Arena: Lietuvos rytas Arena; Attendance: 300; Referees: Vilius Mačiulaitis, Mindaugas Večerskis, Virgilijus Urbšys

Starters:			Pts	Reb	Ast
PG	12	(Lithuania) Šarūnas Vasiliauskas	21	2	2
SG	20	(Lithuania) Dainius Šalenga	5	3	1
SF	7	(Lithuania) Laimonas Kisielius	12	2	6
PF	8	(Lithuania) Vytautas Šulskis	16	10	3
C	14	(Lithuania) Vaidas Čepukaitis	12	1	1
Reserves:					
PG	4	(Lithuania) Kajus Okmanas	0	1	0
PF	6	(Lithuania) Vilmantas Dilys	9	2	6
SG	10	(Lithuania) Paulius Ivanauskas	9	4	2
SG	22	(Lithuania) Domantas Šeškus	4	0	1
SF	32	(Lithuania) Tomas Michnevičius	0	0	0
Head coach:
(Lithuania) Virginijus Šeškus

Vytautas Prienai-Birštonas	Juventus Utena

Starters:			Pts	Reb	Ast
PG	33	(Lithuania) Rolandas Alijevas	5	5	4
SG	22	(United States) Spencer Butterfield	21	5	1
SF	12	(Lithuania) Saulius Kulvietis	4	1	0
PF	21	(Lithuania) Egidijus Dimša	15	7	0
C	11	(Lithuania) Edgaras Želionis	15	5	3
Reserves:					
PF	6	(Lithuania) Arminas Urbutis	6	4	1
SF	9	(Lithuania) Martynas Linkevičius	13	5	2
SG	17	(Lithuania) Laurynas Samėnas	7	0	0
PG	25	(Lithuania) Ugnius Nikitinas	0	0	0
SF	40	(United States) Chavaughn Lewis	0	0	0
Head coach:
(Lithuania) Antanas Sireika

=== Žalgiris Kaunas vs. Nevėžis Kėdainiai ===
19 February 2016 Quarterfinal B	Žalgiris Kaunas	77–64	Nevėžis Kėdainiai	Vilnius
14:30 (EEST)	Scoring by quarter: 15–6, 18–23, 27–9, 17–26
	Pts: Pocius 14; Rebs: Hanlan 9 Asts: Lekavičius 2	Boxscore	Pts: King 15; Rebs: King 10; Asts: King 3	Arena: Lietuvos rytas Arena; Attendance: 500; Referees: Martynas Gudas, Antanas Ramanauskas, Rytis Sabas

Starters:			Pts	Reb	Ast
PG	20	(Latvia) Kaspars Vecvagars	0	1	1
SG	10	(Lithuania) Renaldas Seibutis	7	2	1
SF	7	(Lithuania) Martynas Pocius	14	4	1
PF	3	(Estonia) Siim-Sander Vene	4	4	1
C	14	(Greece) Ian Vougioukas	8	3	1
Reserves:					
PG	4	(Lithuania) Lukas Lekavičius	9	3	2
PF	12	(Australia) Brock Motum	8	5	0
PF	13	(Lithuania) Paulius Jankūnas	10	4	1
C	18	(Lithuania) Martynas Sajus	2	7	1
PG	21	(Canada) Olivier Hanlan	8	9	1
SF	92	(Lithuania) Edgaras Ulanovas	7	1	2
Head coach:
(Lithuania) Šarūnas Jasikevičius

Žalgiris Kaunas	Nevėžis Kėdainiai

Starters:			Pts	Reb	Ast
PG	11	(Lithuania) Ernestas Ežerskis	13	2	0
SG	9	(Lithuania) Darius Gvezdauskas	2	3	1
SF	33	(Lithuania) Andrius Aleksandrovas	2	1	0
PF	31	(United States) Taylor King	15	10	3
C	14	(Lithuania) Mindaugas Kupšas	10	2	0
Reserves:					
SG	6	(United States) Chad Frazier	5	2	1
PF	8	(Lithuania) Vaidotas Volkus	7	3	0
SF	10	(Lithuania) Rokas Grinius	0	0	0
SG	12	(Ukraine) Oleksandr Kolchenko	6	2	3
C	15	(Lithuania) Simonas Kymantas	2	4	1
PG	22	(Lithuania) Aidas Viskontas	2	3	2
Head coach:
(Lithuania) Ramūnas Cvirka

=== Neptūnas Klaipėda vs. Šiauliai ===
19 February 2016 Quarterfinal C	Neptūnas Klaipėda	96–58	Šiauliai	Vilnius
17:00 (EEST)	Scoring by quarter: 26–14, 26–23, 25–11, 19–10
	Pts: Plaisted 14; Rebs: Šarakauskas 6 Asts: Mažeika 8	Boxscore	Pts: Dudzinski 11; Rebs: Dudzinski 6 Asts: Scott 5	Arena: Lietuvos rytas Arena; Attendance: 700; Referees: Gintaras Vitkauskas, Artūras Šukys, Gintaras Mačiulis

Starters:			Pts	Reb	Ast
PG	7	(Lithuania) Martynas Mažeika	12	3	8
SG	13	(United States) Travis Bader	12	1	1
SF	51	(Lithuania) Arnas Butkevičius	12	5	4
PF	45	(United States) Jerai Grant	6	3	1
C	15	(Lithuania) Vytautas Šarakauskas	5	6	2
Reserves:					
PG	3	(United States) Daniel Ewing	8	5	3
SF	6	(Lithuania) Arvydas Šikšnius	7	1	1
SG	30	(Lithuania) Laurynas Beliauskas	8	0	2
SF	41	(Lithuania) Donatas Zavackas	12	6	2
C	44	(United States) Trent Plaisted	14	5	0
PF	49	(Lithuania) Gilvydas Biruta	0	1	1
Head coach:
(Lithuania) Dainius Adomaitis

Neptūnas Klaipėda	Šiauliai

Starters:			Pts	Reb	Ast
PG	0	(United States) Mike Scott	7	3	5
SG	20	(United States) Cameron Ayers	6	2	0
SF	21	(Lithuania) Artūras Jomantas	6	6	0
PF	23	(United States) David Dudzinski	11	6	2
C	33	(Bosnia and Herzegovina) Domagoj Bubalo	6	1	0
Reserves:					
PG	6	(Lithuania) Eividas Mološčiakas	4	0	0
C	7	(Lithuania) Karolis Guščikas	1	0	0
SG	8	(Lithuania) Gintaras Leonavičius	1	1	0
PG	9	(Lithuania) Tadas Pažėra	0	1	0
SG	30	(Lithuania) Arūnas Sajavičius	8	3	0
C	50	(Egypt) Assem Marei	8	5	0
Head coach:
(Lithuania) Gediminas Petrauskas

=== Lietuvos rytas Vilnius vs. Lietkabelis Panevėžys ===
19 February 2016 Quarterfinal D	Lietuvos rytas Vilnius	88–82	Lietkabelis Panevėžys	Vilnius
19:30 (EEST)	Scoring by quarter: 21–15, 24–17, 16–20, 27–30
	Pts: Gailius 14; Rebs: Gudaitis 5 Asts: Brown 4	Boxscore	Pts: Ilić 21; Rebs: Ilić 5 Asts: Pavković 7	Arena: Lietuvos rytas Arena; Attendance: 1400; Referees: Gytis Vilius, Andrius Maleckas, Juozas Barkauskas

Starters:			Pts	Reb	Ast
PG	2	(United States) Kendrick Brown	5	0	4
SG	7	(Lithuania) Adas Juškevičius	11	1	4
SF	13	(Lithuania) Deividas Gailius	14	4	2
PF	14	(Lithuania) Gediminas Orelik	13	3	4
C	16	(Poland) Adam Łapeta	4	3	0
Reserves:					
SF	8	(Lithuania) Mindaugas Lukauskis	11	3	1
PF	12	(Lithuania) Kšyštof Lavrinovič	4	3	1
PG	17	(Ukraine) Denys Lukashov	0	0	2
PG	19	(Lithuania) Žygimantas Janavičius	14	2	3
C	21	(Lithuania) Antanas Kavaliauskas	0	0	0
SG	22	(Lithuania) Marius Runkauskas	0	1	0
C	33	(Lithuania) Artūras Gudaitis	12	5	0
Head coach:
(Lithuania) Tomas Pačėsas

Lietuvos rytas Vilnius	Lietkabelis Panevėžys

Starters:			Pts	Reb	Ast
PG	4	(Serbia) Miljan Pavković	7	0	7
SG	13	(Lithuania) Simas Buterlevičius	11	3	0
SF	77	(Lithuania) Arnas Labuckas	14	2	3
PF	42	(Lithuania) Valdas Vasylius	4	4	4
C	9	(Serbia) Mile Ilić	21	5	4
Reserves:					
SG	6	(United States) Jermaine Love	12	1	3
SG	7	(Lithuania) Lukas Aukštikalnis	0	1	0
PF	16	(Croatia) Jurica Žuža	13	5	1
SF	21	(Lithuania) Mantas Kazonas	0	0	0
SF	22	(Lithuania) Julius Kazakauskas	0	2	1
Head coach:
(Lithuania) Kazys Maksvytis

== Semifinals ==
=== Žalgiris Kaunas vs. Vytautas Prienai-Birštonas ===
20 February 2016 Semifinal 1	Žalgiris Kaunas	90–67	Vytautas Prienai-Birštonas	Vilnius
13:30 (EEST)	Scoring by quarter: 18–22, 21–18, 24–14, 27–13
	Pts: Pocius 17; Rebs: Jankūnas 11; Asts: Vecvagars 4	Boxscore	Pts: Kisielius 26; Rebs: Šulskis 9 Asts: Kisielius 4	Arena: Siemens Arena; Attendance: 2250; Referees: Tomas Jasevičius, Antanas Ramanauskas, Gvidas Gedvilas

Starters:			Pts	Reb	Ast
PG	20	(Latvia) Kaspars Vecvagars	11	1	4
SG	10	(Lithuania) Renaldas Seibutis	5	4	3
SF	7	(Lithuania) Martynas Pocius	17	6	3
PF	13	(Lithuania) Paulius Jankūnas	4	11	1
C	12	(Australia) Brock Motum	8	5	0
Reserves:					
SF	3	(Estonia) Siim-Sander Vene	6	7	2
PG	4	(Lithuania) Lukas Lekavičius	11	0	0
C	14	(Greece) Ian Vougioukas	0	3	0
C	18	(Lithuania) Martynas Sajus	3	3	0
PG	21	(Canada) Olivier Hanlan	11	3	2
SF	92	(Lithuania) Edgaras Ulanovas	14	4	2
Head coach:
(Lithuania) Šarūnas Jasikevičius

Žalgiris Kaunas	Vytautas Prienai-Birštonas

Starters:			Pts	Reb	Ast
PG	12	(Lithuania) Šarūnas Vasiliauskas	3	1	4
SG	10	(Lithuania) Paulius Ivanauskas	19	2	1
SF	20	(Lithuania) Dainius Šalenga	5	2	1
PF	7	(Lithuania) Laimonas Kisielius	26	6	4
C	8	(Lithuania) Vytautas Šulskis	8	9	3
Reserves:					
PG	4	(Lithuania) Kajus Okmanas	3	1	0
PG	22	(Lithuania) Domantas Šeškus	3	1	0
SF	32	(Lithuania) Tomas Michnevičius	0	1	0
Head coach:
(Lithuania) Virginijus Šeškus

=== Lietuvos rytas Vilnius vs. Neptūnas Klaipėda ===
20 February 2016 Semifinal 2	Lietuvos rytas Vilnius	97–79	Neptūnas Klaipėda	Vilnius
16:00 (EEST)	Scoring by quarter: 38–21, 22–20, 26–15, 11–23
	Pts: Runkauskas 15; Rebs: Kavaliauskas 9 Asts: Kavaliauskas 6	Boxscore	Pts: Bader 17; Rebs: Biruta 4 Asts: Ewing 5	Arena: Siemens Arena; Attendance: 5500; Referees: Jurgis Laurinavičius, Andrius Maleckas, Martynas Gudas

Starters:			Pts	Reb	Ast
PG	17	(Ukraine) Denys Lukashov	10	4	4
SG	22	(Lithuania) Marius Runkauskas	15	0	1
SF	13	(Lithuania) Deividas Gailius	5	4	1
PF	21	(Lithuania) Antanas Kavaliauskas	8	9	6
C	16	(Poland) Adam Łapeta	10	6	1
Reserves:					
PG	2	(United States) Kendrick Brown	11	3	2
SG	7	(Lithuania) Adas Juškevičius	8	1	2
SF	8	(Lithuania) Mindaugas Lukauskis	2	0	2
PF	12	(Lithuania) Kšyštof Lavrinovič	2	1	0
SF	14	(Lithuania) Gediminas Orelik	12	2	0
PG	19	(Lithuania) Žygimantas Janavičius	0	1	4
C	33	(Lithuania) Artūras Gudaitis	14	2	1
Head coach:
(Lithuania) Tomas Pačėsas

Lietuvos rytas Vilnius	Neptūnas Klaipėda

Starters:			Pts	Reb	Ast
PG	7	(Lithuania) Martynas Mažeika	12	3	3
SG	13	(United States) Travis Bader	17	0	1
SF	51	(Lithuania) Arnas Butkevičius	4	3	2
PF	45	(United States) Jerai Grant	7	3	1
C	15	(Lithuania) Vytautas Šarakauskas	8	2	1
Reserves:					
PG	3	(United States) Daniel Ewing	15	1	5
SF	6	(Lithuania) Arvydas Šikšnius	4	2	0
SG	30	(Lithuania) Laurynas Bieliauskas	2	2	1
SF	41	(Lithuania) Donatas Zavackas	0	1	1
C	44	(United States) Trent Plaisted	6	4	1
PF	49	(Lithuania) Gilvydas Biruta	4	4	1
Head coach:
(Lithuania) Dainius Adomaitis

== Bronze final ==
21 February 2016 Bronze final	Vytautas Prienai-Birštonas	51–88	Neptūnas Klaipėda	Vilnius
13:00 (EEST)	Scoring by quarter: 9–20, 21–23, 15–24, 6–21
	Pts: Šulskis 11; Rebs: Kisielius 5 Asts: Kisielius 4	Boxscore	Pts: Grant 17; Rebs: Šikšnius 7 Asts: Šikšnius 7	Arena: Siemens Arena; Attendance: 3500; Referees: Vilius Mačiulaitis, Gintaras Vitkauskas, Artūras Šukys

Starters:			Pts	Reb	Ast
PG	12	(Lithuania) Šarūnas Vasiliauskas	11	1	0
SG	10	(Lithuania) Paulius Ivanauskas	2	2	0
SF	20	(Lithuania) Dainius Šalenga	4	0	1
PF	7	(Lithuania) Laimonas Kisielius	6	5	4
C	8	(Lithuania) Vytautas Šulskis	11	2	2
Reserves:					
PG	4	(Lithuania) Kajus Okmanas	10	1	1
PG	22	(Lithuania) Domantas Šeškus	7	3	0
SF	32	(Lithuania) Tomas Michnevičius	0	2	2
Head coach:
(Lithuania) Virginijus Šeškus

Vytautas Prienai-Birštonas	Neptūnas Klaipėda

Starters:			Pts	Reb	Ast
PG	7	(Lithuania) Martynas Mažeika	10	4	3
SG	13	(United States) Travis Bader	10	1	3
SF	51	(Lithuania) Arnas Butkevičius	3	3	2
PF	6	(Lithuania) Arvydas Šikšnius	12	7	7
C	45	(United States) Jerai Grant	17	6	0
Reserves:					
PG	3	(United States) Daniel Ewing	5	3	2
C	15	(Lithuania) Vytautas Šarakauskas	16	4	2
SG	30	(Lithuania) Laurynas Beliauskas	10	0	1
SF	41	(Lithuania) Donatas Zavackas	3	4	0
C	44	(United States) Trent Plaisted	0	0	0
PF	49	(Lithuania) Gilvydas Biruta	2	2	0
Head coach:
(Lithuania) Dainius Adomaitis

== Final ==
21 February 2016	Žalgiris Kaunas	57–67	Lietuvos rytas Vilnius	Vilnius
17:00 (EEST)	Scoring by quarter: 17–20, 6–9, 16–18, 18–20
	Pts: Pocius 13; Rebs: Seibutis 4 Asts: Lekavičius 4	Boxscore	Pts: Kavaliauskas 20; Rebs: Orelik 8 Asts: Kavaliauskas 4	Arena: Siemens Arena; Attendance: 7800; Referees: Tomas Jasevičius, Jurgis Laurinavičius, Gytis Vilius

Starters:			Pts	Reb	Ast
PG	4	(Lithuania) Lukas Lekavičius	2	2	4
SG	10	(Lithuania) Renaldas Seibutis	8	4	0
SF	92	(Lithuania) Edgaras Ulanovas	6	3	1
PF	13	(Lithuania) Paulius Jankūnas	12	1	0
C	12	(Australia) Brock Motum	8	3	1
Reserves:					
SF	3	(Estonia) Siim-Sander Vene	0	0	0
SG	7	(Lithuania) Martynas Pocius	13	3	0
C	14	(Greece) Ian Vougioukas	4	4	0
C	18	(Lithuania) Martynas Sajus	0	0	0
PG	20	(Latvia) Kaspars Vecvagars	0	0	0
PG	21	(Canada) Olivier Hanlan	4	1	3
Head coach:
(Lithuania) Šarūnas Jasikevičius

Žalgiris Kaunas	Lietuvos rytas Vilnius

Karaliaus Mindaugo taurė MVP
(Lithuania) Antanas Kavaliauskas
Game rules
Game was played under FIBA rules.

2016 Karaliaus Mindaugo taurė Winners
Lietuvos rytas Vilnius
1st title

Starters:			Pts	Reb	Ast
PG	2	(United States) Kendrick Brown	6	6	3
SG	22	(Lithuania) Marius Runkauskas	0	0	1
SF	13	(Lithuania) Deividas Gailius	5	5	1
PF	21	(Lithuania) Antanas Kavaliauskas	20	7	4
C	33	(Lithuania) Artūras Gudaitis	7	3	0
Reserves:					
SG	7	(Lithuania) Adas Juškevičius	0	3	1
SG	8	(Lithuania) Mindaugas Lukauskis	11	4	0
PF	12	(Lithuania) Kšyštof Lavrinovič	0	0	0
SF	14	(Lithuania) Gediminas Orelik	5	8	0
C	16	(Poland) Adam Łapeta	5	5	1
PG	17	(Ukraine) Denys Lukashov	8	4	1
PG	19	(Lithuania) Žygimantas Janavičius	0	0	1
Head coach:
(Lithuania) Tomas Pačėsas
