= Lithuania national basketball team at the 2012 Olympic Games =

The Lithuania national basketball team competed in the 2012 Olympic Games after qualifying into it during 2012 FIBA World Olympic Qualifying Tournament.

The following is the Lithuania roster in the men's basketball tournament of the 2012 Summer Olympics.

Lithuania men's national basketball team – 2012 Summer Olympics roster
Players
Coaches

Pos.	No.	Name	Age – Date of birth	Height	Club	Ctr.
G	4	Rimantas Kaukėnas	35 – 11 April 1977	1.94 m (6 ft 4 in)	Mens Sana Basket	(Italy)
G	5	Mantas Kalnietis	25 – 6 September 1986	1.96 m (6 ft 5 in)	BC Žalgiris	(Lithuania)
F	6	Jonas Mačiulis	27 – 10 February 1985	1.98 m (6 ft 6 in)	Mens Sana Basket	(Italy)
G	7	Martynas Pocius	26 – 28 April 1986	1.96 m (6 ft 5 in)	Real Madrid Baloncesto	(Spain)
G	8	Renaldas Seibutis	27 – 23 July 1985	1.98 m (6 ft 6 in)	BC Lietuvos rytas	(Lithuania)
F	9	Darius Songaila	34 – 14 February 1978	2.06 m (6 ft 9 in)	CB Valladolid	(Spain)
G	10	Simas Jasaitis	30 – 26 March 1982	2.01 m (6 ft 7 in)	Türk Telekom B.K.	(Turkey)
F	11	Linas Kleiza (C)	27 – 3 January 1985	2.03 m (6 ft 8 in)	Toronto Raptors	(Canada)
C	12	Antanas Kavaliauskas	27 – 19 September 1984	2.09 m (6 ft 10 in)	BK VEF Rīga	(Latvia)
G	13	Šarūnas Jasikevičius	36 – 5 March 1976	1.93 m (6 ft 4 in)	Panathinaikos B.C.	(Greece)
C	14	Jonas Valančiūnas	20 – 6 May 1992	2.11 m (6 ft 11 in)	BC Lietuvos rytas	(Lithuania)
F	15	Paulius Jankūnas	28 – 29 April 1984	2.06 m (6 ft 9 in)	BC Žalgiris	(Lithuania)

Head coach

- (Lithuania) Kęstutis Kemzūra

Assistant coach(es)

- (Lithuania) Valdemaras Chomičius
- (Lithuania) Robertas Kuncaitis
- (Lithuania) Donaldas Kairys

Team manager

- (Lithuania) (Australia) Antanas Guoga

Legend

- Club – describes last
  club before the tournament
- Age – describes age
  on 29 July 2012
- (C) – team captain

Group play

Pos	Team	Pld	W	L	PF	PA	PD	Pts	Qualification
1	United States	5	5	0	589	398	+191	10	Quarterfinals
2	France	5	4	1	376	378	−2	9	Quarterfinals
3	Argentina	5	3	2	448	424	+24	8	Quarterfinals
4	Lithuania	5	2	3	395	399	−4	7	Quarterfinals
5	Nigeria	5	1	4	338	456	−118	6	
6	Tunisia	5	0	5	320	411	−91	5	

Source: FIBA archive
Rules for classification: 1) points; 2) head-to-head points; 3) head-to-head goal average; 4) head-to-head number of points scored.

29 July 2012
22:15

Report

Argentina	102–79	Lithuania
Scoring by quarter: 24–23, 27–16, 27–22, 24–18
Pts: Scola 32; Rebs: Ginóbili 10; Asts: Ginóbili, Prigioni 6		Pts: Kleiza 20; Rebs: Kleiza 7 Asts: Kalnietis 5

Basketball Arena, London
Referees: Carl Jungebrand (FIN), Jorge Carrion (PUR), Vaughan Mayberry (AUS)

31 July 2012
14:30

Report

Lithuania	72–53	Nigeria
Scoring by quarter: 14–8, 20–19, 22–13, 16–13
Pts: Songaila 12; Rebs: Kleiza 6 Asts: Jasikevičius 9		Pts: Diogu, Al. Aminu 12; Rebs: Al. Aminu 11; Asts: Al. Aminu 2

Basketball Arena, London
Referees: Cristiano Maranho (BRA), Stephen Seibel (CAN), Vitalis Gode (KEN)

2 August 2012
09:00

Report

France	82–74	Lithuania
Scoring by quarter: 25–21, 14–22, 20–9, 23–22
Pts: Parker 27; Rebs: Turiaf 10; Asts: Diaw 8		Pts: Kleiza 17; Rebs: Kleiza 7 Asts: Jasikevičius 5

Basketball Arena, London
Referees: Christos Christodoulou (GRE), Ilija Belošević (SRB), Jorge Vázquez (PUR)

4 August 2012
14:30

Report

Lithuania	94–99	United States
Scoring by quarter: 25–33, 26–22, 21–23, 22–21
Pts: Kleiza 25; Rebs: Pocius 7 Asts: Jasikevičius, Pocius 6		Pts: James, Anthony 20; Rebs: Love 8 Asts: Paul 6

Basketball Arena, London
Referees: Recep Ankaralı (TUR), Luigi Lamonica (ITA), Marcos Benito (BRA)

6 August 2012
11:15

Report

Tunisia	63–76	Lithuania
Scoring by quarter: 18–7, 17–22, 19–21, 9–26
Pts: Rzig 17; Rebs: Mejri 12; Asts: Mejri 3		Pts: Songaila, Jasikevičius 13; Rebs: Kleiza, Valančiūnas 6 Asts: Kalnietis 9

Basketball Arena, London
Referees: Juan Arteaga (ESP), Saša Pukl (SLO), Felicia Grinter (USA)

Quarter-final

8 August 2012
14:00

Report

Russia	83–74	Lithuania
Scoring by quarter: 17–10, 15–17, 22–23, 29–24
Pts: Kirilenko 19; Rebs: Kirilenko 13; Asts: Khryapa 8		Pts: Kaukėnas 19; Rebs: Valančiūnas 9 Asts: four players 3

North Greenwich Arena, London
Referees: Carl Jungebrand (FIN), Pablo Estévez (ARG), Michael Aylen (AUS)
