= 2014 LKL All-Star Game =

Rytai	Vakarai
	1	2	3	4	Total
Rytai	25	27	30	26	108
Vakarai	31	29	32	21	113
- Date: March 2, 2014
- Venue: Švyturys Arena, Klaipėda
- MVP: Justin Dentmon

The annual 2014 LKL All-star Game, was held on March 2, in Klaipėda. The format was slightly different from the previous contests: LKL teams were geographically divided into an eastern division and a western division. Players from teams of each conference then made up the respective All-Star team.

== Divisions ==
- Rytai (Eastern): Lietuvos rytas, Pieno žvaigždės, Nevėžis, Juventus, Lietkabelis
- Vakarai (Western): Žalgiris, TonyBet, Neptūnas, Šiauliai, Dzūkija, LSU–Atletas

== Teams ==
Rytai
Pos.	Player	Team	Total Votes
Starters
PG	(Lithuania) Renaldas Seibutis	BC Lietuvos rytas	3,787
SG	(Lithuania) Martynas Gecevičius	BC Lietuvos rytas	
SF	(Lithuania) Arvydas Šikšnius	BC Nevėžis	3,042
PF	(Colombia) Juan Palacios	BC Lietuvos rytas	3,648
C	(Lithuania) Darius Songaila**	BC Lietuvos rytas	4,299
Reserves
PG	(United States) Zabian Dowdell	BC Lietuvos rytas	
SF	(Lithuania) Artūras Jomantas	BC Pieno žvaigždės	
C	(United States) A.J. Mathews	BC Juventus	
SF	(Lithuania) Žygimantas Jonušas	BC Pieno žvaigždės	
SG	(Lithuania) Gintaras Leonavičius	BC Nevėžis	
PF	(Lithuania) Valdas Dabkus	BC Nevėžis	
PG	(Lithuania) Aidas Viskontas	BC Juventus	

Vakarai
Pos.	Player	Team	Total Votes
Starters
PG	(United States) Justin Dentmon	BC Žalgiris	3,821
SG	(Lithuania) Martynas Pocius	BC Žalgiris	2,542
SF	(Lithuania) Mindaugas Lukauskis	BC TonyBet	
PF	(Lithuania) Paulius Jankūnas	BC Žalgiris	4,845
C	(Lithuania) Kšyštof Lavrinovič*	BC Žalgiris	2,420
Reserves
SG	(Lithuania) Marius Runkauskas	BC Neptūnas	
F/C	(Lithuania) Artūras Valeika	BC TonyBet	
PG	(Lithuania) Martynas Mažeika	BC Neptūnas	
SG	(United States) Travis Leslie	BC Šiauliai	
F	(Lithuania) Valdas Vasylius	BC Neptūnas	
PG	(Montenegro) Derek Needham	BC Šiauliai	
PF	(Lithuania) Laimonas Kisielius	BC TonyBet	

* replaced by Giedrius Staniulis, of BC Dzūkija.
** replaced by Artūras Jomantas, of BC Pieno žvaigždės, in starting line-up, and by Ryan Olander, of BC Lietkabelis, in the roster.

== Coaches ==
Aleksandar Petrović of Lietuvos rytas was chosen to coach Rytai team and Saulius Štombergas of Žalgiris was chosen to coach the Vakarai team.

== Game ==
March 3
16:45 CET

Report

(United Nations) Vakarai 113, (United Nations) Rytai 108
Scoring by quarter: 31–25, 29–27, 32–30, 21–26
Pts: Justin Dentmon 21; Rebs: Justin Dentmon 6 Asts: Justin Dentmon 8	Pts: Renaldas Seibutis 24; Rebs: Žygimantas Jonušas 7 Asts: Renaldas Seibutis 11

Švyturys Arena (Klaipėda)
Attendance: 5,000
