= 2015 LKL All-Star Game =

LKL Žvaigždės	Amžini Priešininkai
95	105
	1	2	3	4	Total
LKL Žvaigždės	30	32	22	11	95
Amžini Priešininkai	35	34	21	15	105
- Date: March 29, 2015
- Venue: Siemens Arena, Vilnius
- MVP: Travis Leslie
- Attendance: 9,000

The annual 2015 LKL All-Star Game, was held on March 29, in Vilnius. The format was different from the previous contests: one team – Amžini Priešininkai – consisted of the best players from the two rivaling teams of Žalgiris and Lietuvos rytas, and the other team – LKL Žvaigždės – consisted of the best players from the rest of the LKL teams.

== Teams ==
Amžini Priešininkai
Pos.	Player	Team	Total Votes
Starters
PG	(Lithuania) Adas Juškevičius	Lietuvos rytas	9,423
SG	(United States) James Anderson	Žalgiris	15,980
SF	(Lithuania) Edgaras Ulanovas	Žalgiris	7,855
PF	(Lithuania) Paulius Jankūnas	Žalgiris	11,328
C	(Lithuania) Antanas Kavaliauskas	Lietuvos rytas	9,862
Reserves
F	(Lithuania) Gediminas Orelikas	Lietuvos rytas	
G/F	(Lithuania) Artūras Milaknis	Žalgiris	
F/C	(Lithuania) Kšyštof Lavrinovič	Lietuvos rytas	
PG	(Lithuania) Lukas Lekavičius	Žalgiris	
SG	(United States) Travis Leslie	Lietuvos rytas	
C	(Ukraine) Grigorij Khizhnyak	Žalgiris**	
PF	(Lithuania) Andrius Šležas	Lietuvos rytas**	

LKL Žvaigždės
Pos.	Player	Team	Total Votes
Starters
PG	(Albania) Rashaun Broadus	Juventus	5,769
SG	(Lithuania) Martynas Mažeika	Neptūnas	7,952
SF	(Lithuania) Deividas Gailius	Neptūnas	8,074
PF	(Lithuania) Julius Jucikas	Šiauliai	5,009
C	(United States) Alex Oriakhi	Pieno žvaigždės	6,457
Reserves
SF	(Lithuania) Arvydas Šikšnius	Juventus	
F/C	(Russia) Fedor Dmitriev	Dzūkija	
SG	(Lithuania) Rokas Giedraitis	Šiauliai	
PG	(Georgia (country)) Michael Dixon	Pieno žvaigždės	
PG	(Lithuania) Evaldas Žabas	Lietkabelis	
F	(Lithuania) Mindaugas Žukauskas	Šiauliai**	
SG	(Lithuania) Martynas Paliukėnas	Dzūkija**	

** Former Žalgiris and Lietuvos rytas members, Grigorij Khizhnyak and Andrius Šležas, respectively, appeared in the game, as a surprise to the spectators. While a member of Žalgiris, Khizhnyak led the EuroLeague in blocks per game, and otherwise led the team in points and rebounds. Šležas represented Lietuvos rytas for 9 seasons, and was known for his three point shooting abilities. For the "LKL Žvaigždės" team, the two late additions were Mindaugas Žukauskas and Martynas Paliukėnas. Žukauskas, who was a longtime Šiauliai player, established himself as an excellent defender, and a regular Lithuanian national team member. Paliukėnas, is a current member of Dzūkija.

== Coaches ==
Gintaras Krapikas, of Žalgiris, was chosen as the head coach of Amžini Priešininkai, after collecting 13,152 votes, and ousting his opponent, Marcelo Nicola of Lietuvos rytas, who gathered 6,609 votes. Kazys Maksvytis, of Neptūnas, was chosen as the head coach of LKL Žvaigždės, defeating Dainius Adomaitis, of Juventus, by 7,945 votes to 6,513 votes.

== Game ==
March 29
16:15 (CET)

Report

Amžini Priešininkai 105, LKL Žvaigždės 95
Scoring by quarter: 35–30, 34–32, 21–22, 15–11
Pts: Travis Leslie 28; Rebs: Adas Juškevičius 5 Asts: James Anderson 7	Pts: Deividas Gailius 17; Rebs: Alex Oriakhi 7 Asts: Deividas Gailius 5

Siemens Arena (Vilnius)
Attendance: 9,000
