= Travis Leslie =

American basketball player (born 1990)

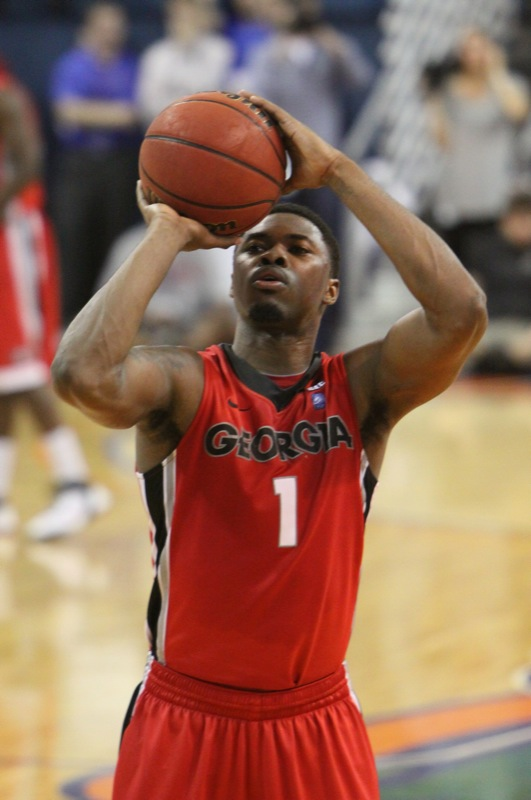
- Leslie with the Georgia Bulldogs in 2011

Personal information
- Born: March 29, 1990 (age 36) Atlanta, Georgia, U.S.
- Listed height: 6 ft 4 in (1.93 m)
- Listed weight: 205 lb (93 kg)

Career information
- High school: Columbia (Decatur, Georgia)
- College: Georgia (2008–2011)
- NBA draft: 2011: 2nd round, 47th overall pick
- Drafted by: Los Angeles Clippers
- Playing career: 2011–2025
- Position: Point guard / shooting guard
- Number: 23, 15, 8, 6

Career history
- 2011–2012: Los Angeles Clippers
- 2012: →Bakersfield Jam
- 2012–2013: Santa Cruz Warriors
- 2013–2014: ASVEL Basket
- 2014: BC Šiauliai
- 2014–2015: Lietuvos rytas
- 2015–2016: Medi Bayreuth
- 2016–2017: Fort Wayne Mad Ants
- 2017: Sydney Kings
- 2017–2018: Levallois Metropolitans
- 2018–2019: Boulazac Basket Dordogne
- 2019–2020: Élan Béarnais Pau-Lacq-Orthez
- 2020–2021: Champagne Châlons-Reims
- 2021: Leones de Ponce
- 2021–2022: Coosur Real Betis
- 2022–2023: Legia Warsaw
- 2023–2024: Kazma
- 2024: Astros de Jalisco
- 2024–2025: CS Maristes

Career highlights
- All-NBA D-League Second Team (2013); NBA Development League All-Star (2013); NBA Development League All-Star Game MVP (2013); BBL MVP (2014); BBL Finals MVP (2014); 2× LKL All-Star (2014, 2015); 2× LKL Slam Dunk Contest Champion (2014, 2015); Lithuanian League leading scorer (2014); LKL All-Star Game MVP (2015); Second-team All-SEC (2011)
- Stats at NBA.com
- Stats at Basketball Reference

Travis Demetrius Leslie (born March 29, 1990) is an American former professional basketball player. He is a 6'4", 205 lb shooting guard out of the University of Georgia.

== High school ==
Leslie attended Columbia High School, in Decatur, Georgia, where he played basketball.

== College career ==
Leslie played NCAA Division I college basketball at the University of Georgia, where he played with the Georgia Bulldogs, from 2008 to 2011.

== Professional career ==
=== NBA and G League ===
Leslie was drafted by the Los Angeles Clippers in the second round of the 2011 NBA draft with the 47th pick. In March 2012, Leslie was assigned twice to the Bakersfield Jam, the Clippers' D-League affiliate. Leslie was waived by the Clippers on October 30, 2012.

On November 2, 2012, Leslie was selected by the Santa Cruz Warriors in the NBA D-League Draft.

On February 14, 2013, Leslie was named to the Prospects All-Star roster for the 2013 NBA D-League All-Star Game as a replacement for Andrew Goudelock. He was subsequently named the MVP of the D-League All-Star Game with 19 points, 7 rebounds and 1 assist as the Prospects went on to defeat the Futures 139–125.

On March 10, 2013, Leslie was signed to a 10-day contract by the Utah Jazz. He did not appear in a game for the Jazz during that time, and was not signed to a second 10-day contract. He returned to the Santa Cruz Warriors following his stint.

=== International ===
In August 2013, Leslie joined JSF Nanterre of France. He left them before the start of the new season, and then signed with ASVEL Basket. ASVEL waived him on January 13, 2014. In January 2014, Leslie signed with BC Šiauliai. On July 23, 2014, Leslie signed a one-year deal with an option to another with Lietuvos rytas of Lithuania. After his contract with Lietuvos rytas expired, Leslie signed on August 14, 2015, with Medi Bayreuth of the Basketball Bundesliga. On October 30, 2016, Leslie was selected by the Fort Wayne Mad Ants with the fourth overall pick in the 2016 NBA Development League Draft. On August 10, 2017, Leslie signed with the Sydney Kings for the 2017–18 NBL season. On November 9, 2017, he was released by the Kings. On November 12, 2017, Leslie signed with French club Levallois Metropolitans for the rest of the season. He averaged 12.3 points per game with the team. Leslie signed with Boulazac Basket Dordogne on October 8, 2018. On June 20, 2019, Leslie signed with Élan Béarnais Pau-Lacq-Orthez of the LNB Pro A. On July 15, 2020, Leslie signed with Champagne Châlons-Reims in the Pro A. On September 9, 2021, Leslie signed with Leones de Ponce in the Baloncesto Superior Nacional. He averaged 13.3 points, 6.6 rebounds, 3.4 assists, and 1.2 steals per game. On December 20, 2021, Leslie signed with Real Betis Baloncesto of the Liga ACB. On July 30, 2022, he has signed with Legia Warszawa of the Polish Basketball League. On September 24, 2023, Leslie signed with the Kazma of the West Asia Super League. On December 28, 2024, Leslie signed with the CS Maristes of the Lebanese Basketball League.

== NBA career statistics ==
Legend
GP	Games played	GS	Games started	MPG	Minutes per game
FG%	Field goal percentage	3P%	3-point field goal percentage	FT%	Free throw percentage
RPG	Rebounds per game	APG	Assists per game	SPG	Steals per game
BPG	Blocks per game	PPG	Points per game	**Bold**	Career high

=== Regular season ===
Year	Team	GP	GS	MPG	FG%	3P%	FT%	RPG	APG	SPG	BPG	PPG
2011–12	L. A. Clippers	10	0	4.5	.357	.000	.444	.9	.5	.2	.2	1.4
Career		10	0	4.5	.357	.000	.444	.9	.5	.2	.2	1.4
