= Gediminas Orelik =

Lithuanian basketball player

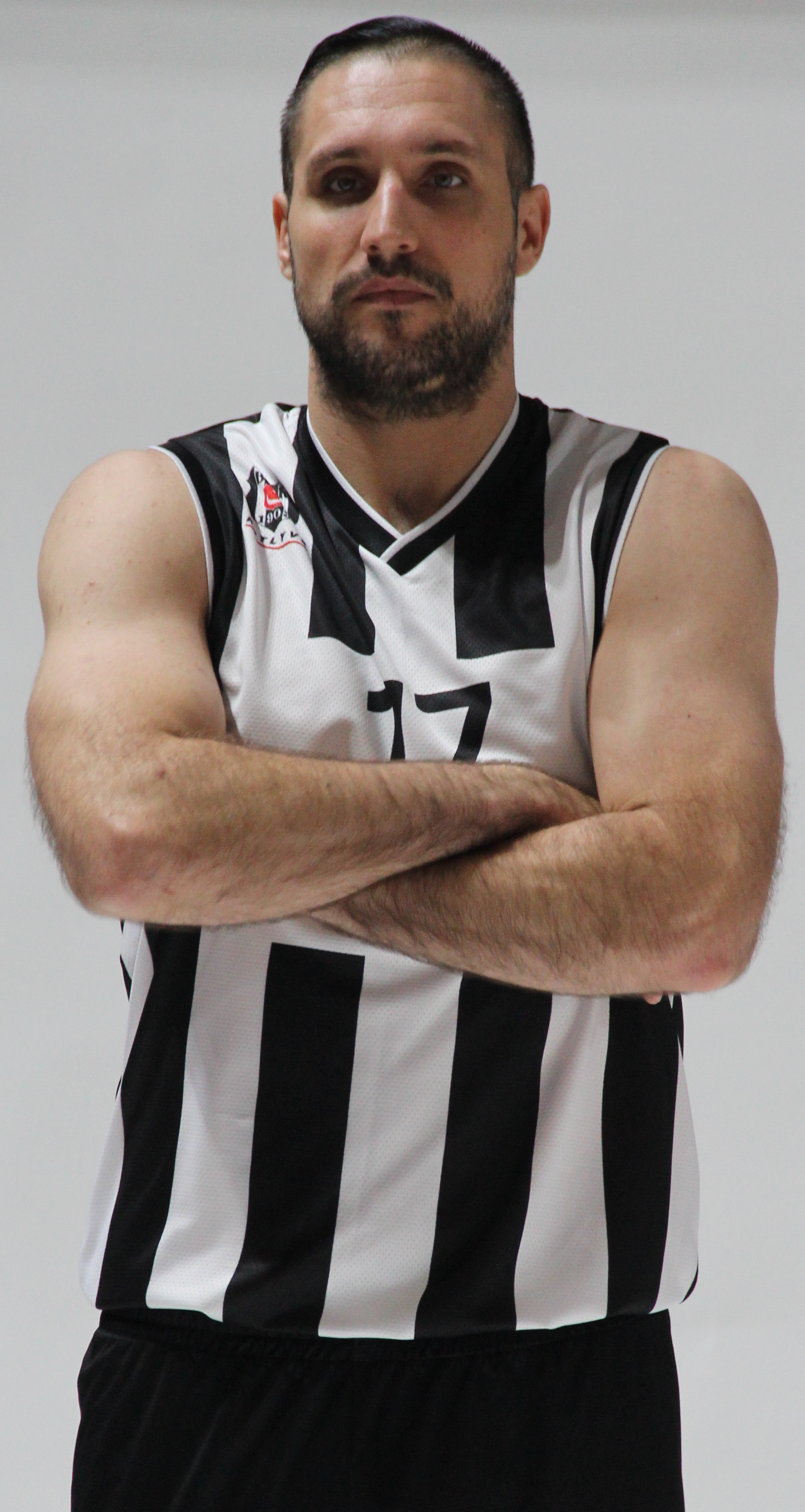
- Orelik with Beşiktaş in 2022

Absheron Lions
- Position: Power forward
- League: Azerbaijan Basketball League; FIBA Europe Cup

Personal information
- Born: 14 May 1990 (age 36) Šiauliai, Lithuania
- Listed height: 2.00 m (6 ft 7 in)
- Listed weight: 105 kg (231 lb)

Career information
- NBA draft: 2012: undrafted
- Playing career: 2006–present

Career history
- 2006–2010: Šiauliai
- 2008–2009: →Meresta Pakruojis
- 2010–2013: Rūdupis / TonyBet Prienai
- 2013–2016: Lietuvos rytas
- 2016–2017: Banvit
- 2017–2018: Reyer Venezia
- 2020: Šiauliai
- 2020–2021: Spars Sarajevo
- 2021–2022: Lietkabelis Panevėžys
- 2022–2023: Beşiktaş
- 2023–2024: Lietkabelis Panevėžys
- 2024: Juventus Utena
- 2024–2025: U-BT Cluj-Napoca
- 2025-present: Absheron Lions

Career highlights
- Liga Națională champion (2024-25); All-LKL Team (2022); FIBA Europe Cup champion (2018); BCL Star Lineup Second Best Team (2017); Turkish Cup winner (2017); Lithuanian King Mindaugas Cup winner (2016); 2× Lithuanian LKL All-Star (2013, 2015); Lithuanian LKL top scorer (2013); Lithuanian LKL MVP (2013); Baltic BBL MVP (2013)

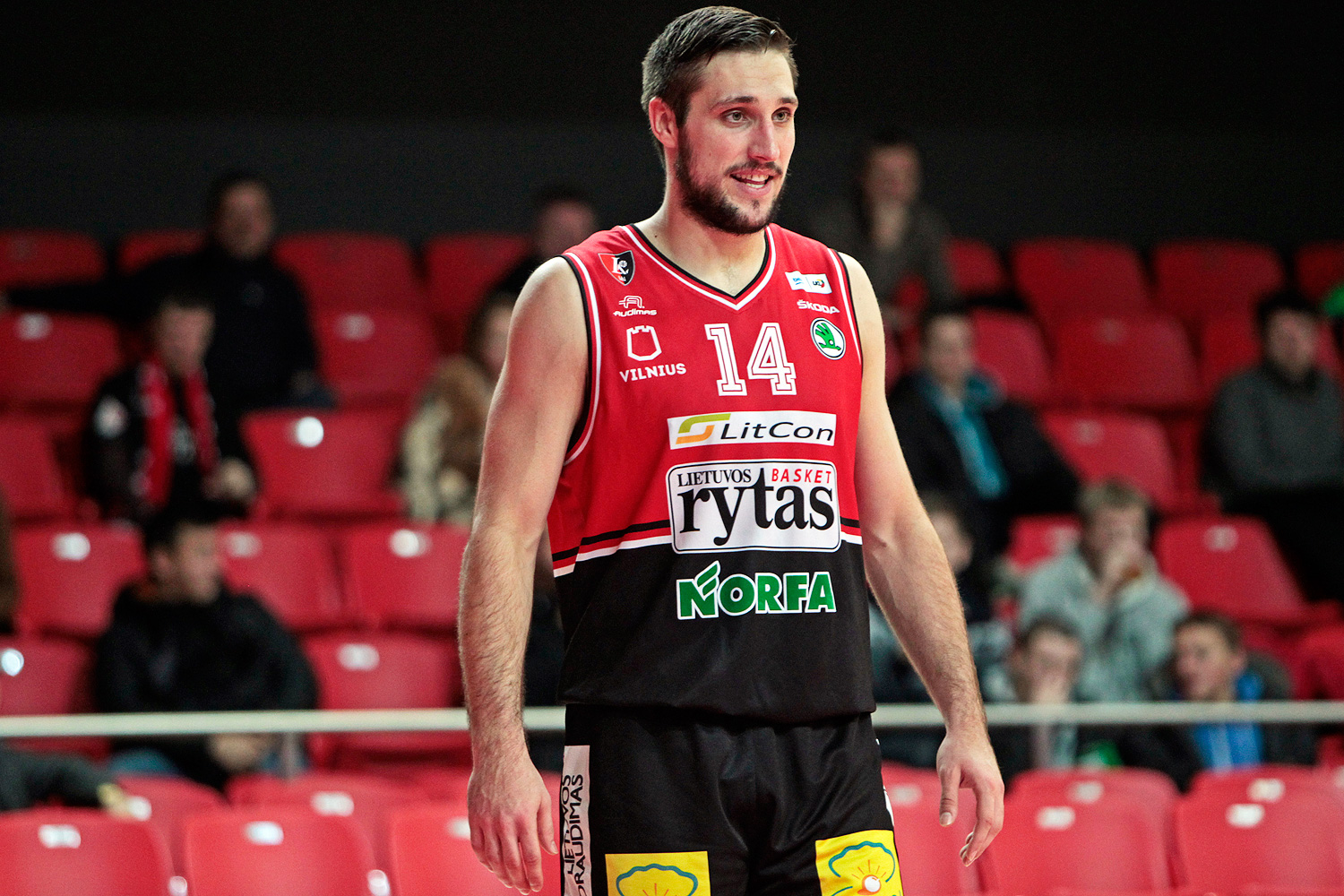
Orelik in 2015

Gediminas Orelik (Lithuanian: Gediminas Orelikas) (born 14 May 1990) is a Lithuanian professional basketball player. He primarily plays at power forward position.

== Professional career ==
At the conclusion of the Lithuanian League's 2012–13 season, Orelik won the league's season MVP award, after averaging 17.1 points per game, 5.4 rebounds per game, and 21.2 efficiency points per game. On 17 May 2013, it was announced that Orelik signed with Lietuvos rytas Vilnius.

On 1 August 2016, Orelik signed with Banvit of the Turkish Basketbol Süper Ligi (BSL).

On 15 July 2017, Orelik signed with Reyer Venezia Mestre of the Lega Basket Serie A (LBA), for the 2017–18 season. He averaged 14.9 points, 4.8 rebounds and 2.9 assists in the LBA, along with 14.2 points, 5.2 rebounds and 3.5 assists in the Champions League, before suffering a season-ending knee injury in January 2018.

On 14 October 2020, Orelik signed with BC Šiauliai of the Lithuanian Basketball League (LKL).

On 11 July 2021, Orelik signed a one-year contract with Lietkabelis Panevėžys of the Lithuanian Basketball League (LKL) and the EuroCup. He averaged 15.4 points, 4.7 rebounds, 2.7 assists and 1.0 steals in 15 EuroCup games played.

On 29 July 2022, Orelik signed with Beşiktaş of the Basketbol Süper Ligi (BSL). On 16 January 2023, he left the club on a mutual agreement. On the same day, he returned to Lietkabelis Panevėžys, signing until the end of the season.

On 5 July 2024, Orelik signed a two-year deal with Juventus Utena of the Lithuanian Basketball League (LKL). On 18 November 2024 he inked a deal with U-BT Cluj-Napoca of the Romanian Liga Națională and the EuroCup.

== National team career ==
=== Lithuanian junior national team ===
Orelik was a part of the Lithuanian Under-16, Under-18, Under-19, and Under-20 junior national teams. In 2009, he played alongside Donatas Motiejūnas, and led Lithuania to a 9th-place finish at the Under-19 World Cup. In 2011, he won a bronze medal, while representing Lithuania at the 2011 Summer Universiade.

=== Lithuanian senior national team ===
In 2015, Orelik was included into the senior Lithuanian national team's extended candidates list. However, he was not invited into the team's training camp later on.

== Personal life ==
Orelik is of Belarusian and Polish descent.
