= Alex Oriakhi =

American basketball player

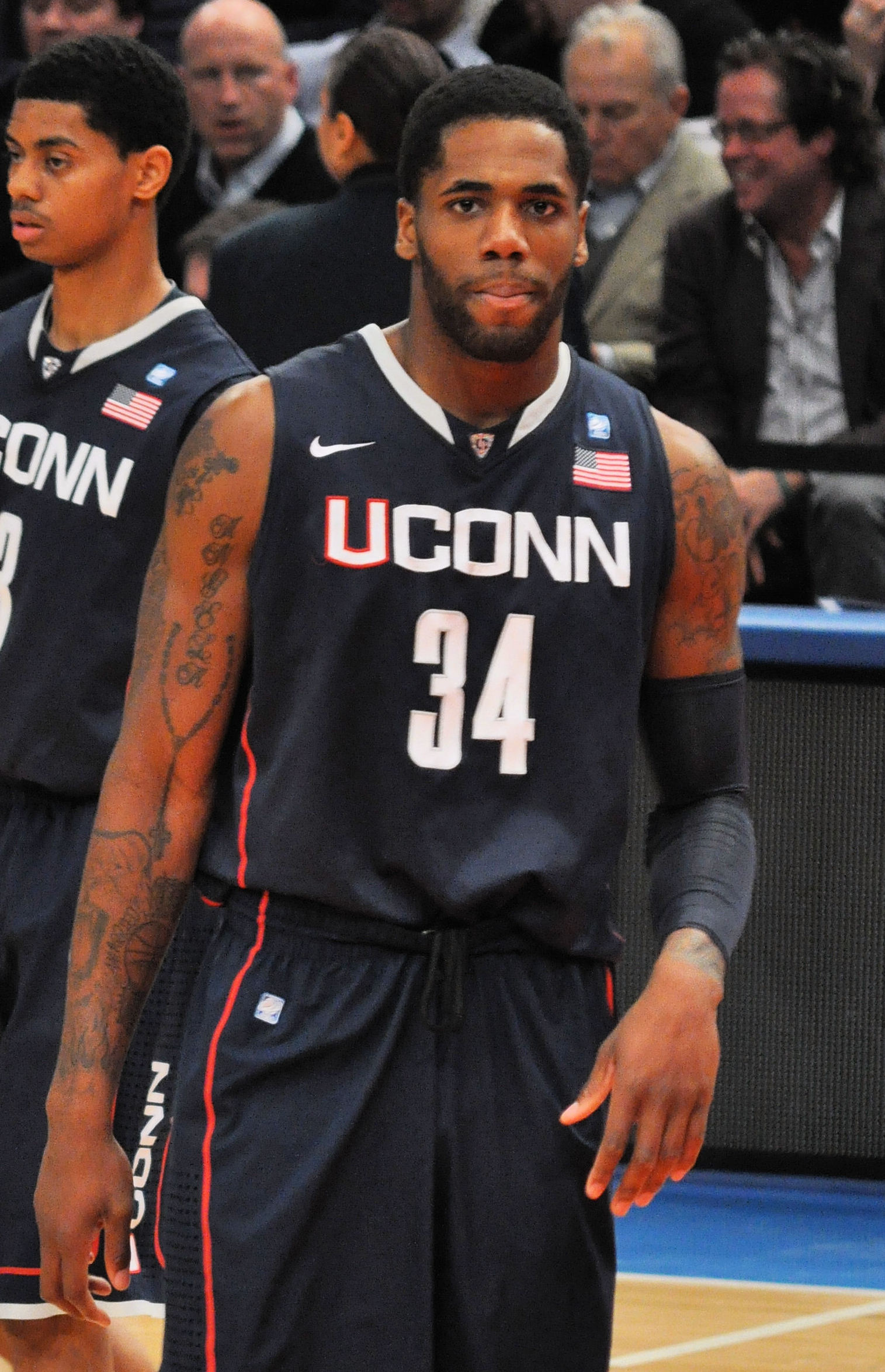
- Oriakhi with UConn in 2011

Personal information
- Born: June 21, 1990 (age 36) Lowell, Massachusetts, U.S.
- Listed height: 6 ft 9 in (2.06 m)
- Listed weight: 255 lb (116 kg)

Career information
- High school: Tilton School (Tilton, New Hampshire)
- College: UConn (2009–2012); Missouri (2012–2013)
- NBA draft: 2013: 2nd round, 57th overall pick
- Drafted by: Phoenix Suns
- Playing career: 2013–2022
- Position: Power forward

Career history
- 2013: Limoges CSP
- 2013: Hapoel Holon
- 2013–2014: Erie BayHawks
- 2014: Sioux Falls Skyforce
- 2014–2015: Pieno Žvaigždės
- 2015–2016: Orlandina Basket
- 2016: Bucaneros de La Guaira
- 2016: Socar Petkim
- 2017: Garzas de Plata
- 2017: Vaqueros de Bayamón
- 2017: Club Biguá
- 2018: Fuerza Regia
- 2019: Vitória S.C.
- 2021–2022: Depiro Rabat Imtarfa

Career highlights
- LKL All-Star (2015); NBA D-League All-Rookie First Team (2014); NCAA champion (2011); Second-team Parade All-American (2009); McDonald's All-American (2009)
- Stats at Basketball Reference

Alexander Ayemere Oriakhi Jr. (pronounced "Or-e-ah-ki"; born June 21, 1990) is an American former professional basketball player. He was the starting center for the Connecticut Huskies' 2010–11 NCAA championship team. He transferred to the University of Missouri for his senior year. He was selected with the 57th overall pick in the 2013 NBA draft by the Phoenix Suns.

== Early life ==
Oriakhi attended and played in 2004–05 at the Fessenden School (a K-9 school) in West Newton, Massachusetts for coach Pete Sanderson. Oriakhi played at Brooks School before playing for the Tilton School in Tilton, New Hampshire. As a senior, he was named a McDonald's All-American as well as a second-team Parade All-American and the Gatorade player of the year for New Hampshire.

Considered a five-star recruit by Rivals.com, Oriakhi was listed as the No. 3 center and the No. 21 player in the nation in 2009.

Oriakhi chose the University of Connecticut to play for Hall of Fame coach Jim Calhoun.

== College career ==
He started most of his freshman season, averaging 5.0 points and 6.6 rebounds per game. At the close of the season, he was named to the Big East Conference all-rookie team.

As a sophomore, Oriakhi raised his game to average 9.9 points, 8.7 rebounds (second in the Big East) and 1.6 blocks per game (7th in the Big East). He was the main post presence for the Huskies as they won the 2011 Big East tournament and the 2011 NCAA men's tournament. As a junior, Oriakhi saw his minutes decrease with the addition of highly recruited freshman Andre Drummond. His production dropped as well as he averaged 6.7 points and 4.8 rebounds per game.

After the season, Oriakhi announced his intention to transfer to another school, citing the Huskies' 2013 ban on postseason play. Because Connecticut's postseason ban covered his entire remaining eligibility (one season), he was eligible to play for his new school during the 2012–13 season. Ultimately Oriakhi transferred to Missouri. During his time at Missouri, he scored 11.2 points, grabbed 8.4 rebounds, and recorded 1.6 blocks per game in 25.8 minutes of play for 34 games.

== Professional career ==
=== 2013–14 season ===
On June 27, 2013, Oriakhi was selected by the Phoenix Suns in the 2013 NBA draft with the 57th overall pick. In July 2013, he joined the Suns for the 2013 NBA Summer League. On August 2, 2013, he signed his first professional contract with Limoges CSP of the LNB Pro A. On November 6, 2013, he parted ways with Limoges after just six games. Four days later, he signed with Hapoel Holon of Israel. In December 2013, he left Israel and returned to the United States.

On December 19, 2013, Oriakhi was acquired by the Erie BayHawks of the NBA Development League. On February 8, 2014, he was traded to the Sioux Falls Skyforce. He went on to earn NBA D-League All-Rookie first team honors.

=== 2014–15 season ===
On July 12, 2014, Oriakhi's rights were traded to the Sacramento Kings in exchange for Isaiah Thomas. When the trade was officially completed, Oriakhi would help the Kings win the 2014 NBA Summer League competition in Las Vegas. On September 20, 2014, he signed with Pieno Žvaigždės of Lithuania for the 2014–15 season.

=== 2015–16 season ===
In July 2015, Oriakhi joined the Sacramento Kings for the 2015 NBA Summer League. On August 10, 2015, he signed with Orlandina Basket of the Italian Serie A for the 2015–16 season. He averaged 8.5 points and 8.8 rebounds in 30 games.

On May 14, 2016, Oriakhi signed with Bucaneros de La Guaira of the Venezuelan League. That day, he made his debut for Bucaneros in an 86–71 win over Cocodrilos de Caracas, recording 16 points, 12 rebounds and four blocks in 30 minutes.

=== 2016–17 season ===
On July 22, 2016, Oriakhi signed with Socar Petkim of the Turkish Basketball First League. He left Socar after appearing in ten games. On January 7, 2017, he signed with Garzas de Plata of the Liga Nacional de Baloncesto Profesional. On April 12, 2017, he signed with the Vaqueros de Bayamón of the Baloncesto Superior Nacional.

=== 2017–18 season ===
On January 26, 2018, Oriakhi signed with Fuerza Regia of the Mexican LNBP, the highest tier of professional basketball in Mexico.

=== 2021–22 season ===
On June 3, 2021, Oriakhi signed with Depiro Rabat Imtarfa of the Maltese Division One Basketball league.
