= Mindaugas Lukauskis =

Lithuanian basketball player (born 1979)

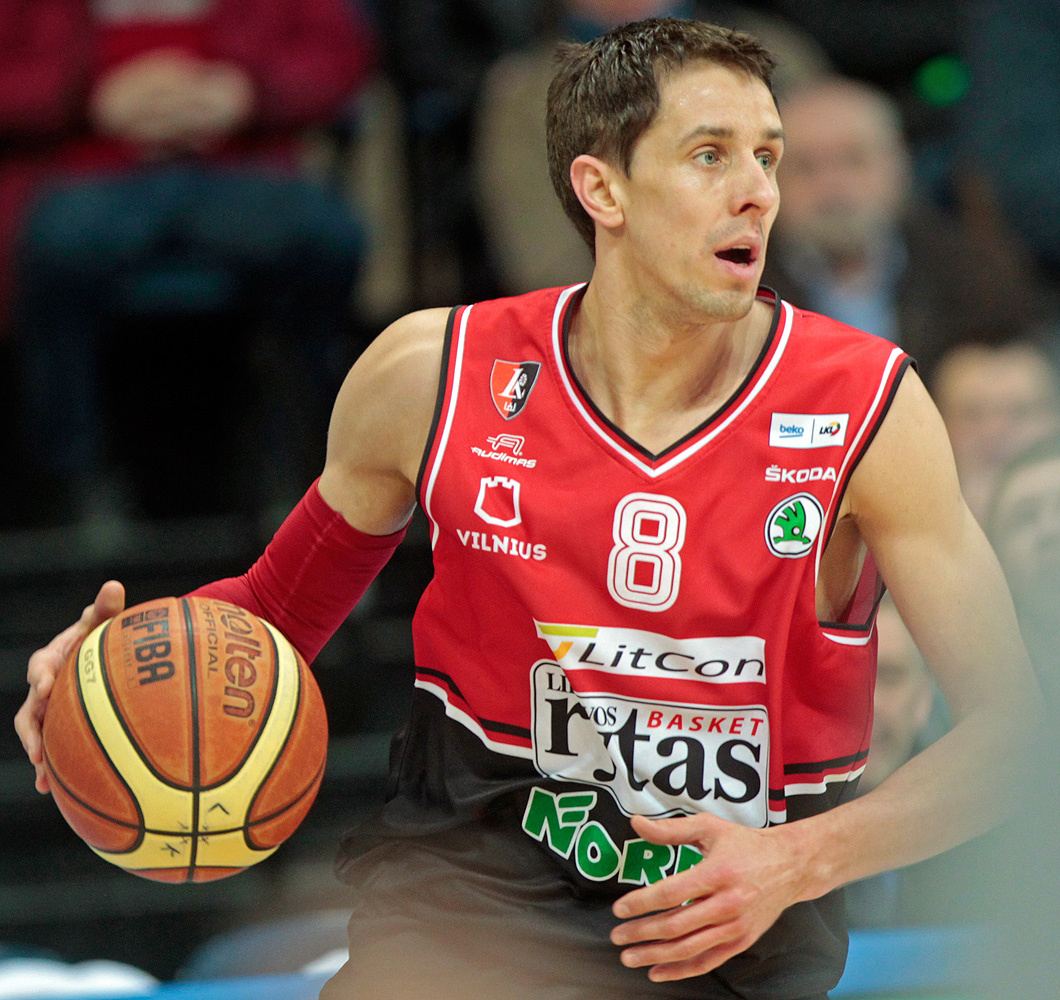
- Lukauskis with Lietuvos rytas in 2015

Personal information
- Born: 19 May 1979 (age 47) Panevėžys, Lithuania
- Listed height: 6 ft 6 in (1.98 m)
- Listed weight: 198 lb (90 kg)

Career information
- NBA draft: 2001: undrafted
- Playing career: 1996–2025
- Position: Small forward / shooting guard
- Number: 8, 16, 5, 79

Career history
- 1996–2001: Lietkabelis/Kalnapilis/Sema Panevėžys
- 2001–2002: Sakalai
- 2002–2003: BC Alita
- 2003–2009: Lietuvos rytas Vilnius
- 2009–2010: ASVEL Lyon-Villeurbanne
- 2010–2011: EWE Baskets Oldenburg
- 2011–2012: Sigma Barcellona
- 2012: Valencia Basket
- 2013: Tofaş
- 2013: Bilbao Basket
- 2013–2014: TonyBet Prienai
- 2014–2016: Lietuvos rytas Vilnius
- 2016–2017: Lietkabelis Panevėžys
- 2017–2018: Lietuvos rytas Vilnius
- 2018–2020: Skycop/CBet Prienai
- 2020–2021: BC Šiauliai
- 2021–2022: Dzūkija Alytus
- 2022–2023: BC Wolves
- 2023–2024: Jurbarkas-Karys
- 2024–2025: Milasta Birštonas

Career highlights
- 2× ULEB Cup champion (2005, 2009); 2× LKL champion (2006, 2009); 3× LKL All-Star (2008, 2009, 2014); LKL Three-point Shootout champion (2018); 2× LKF Cup winner (2009, 2014); LKF Cup MVP (2014); King Mindaugas Cup winner (2016); 3× BBL champion (2006, 2007, 2009); NKL champion (2024); Match des champions winner (2009); Semaine de As Cup winner (2010); LKL records: Most points scored all-time in LKL history; Most assists made all-time in LKL history; Most minutes played all-time in LKL history; Most fouls made all-time in LKL history; Most steals made all-time in LKL history; Most games played in LKL history; Oldest player in LKL history; Most three-pointers attempted all-time in LKL history

Mindaugas Lukauskis locally also known as the Legend or the Iron man, (born 19 May 1979) is a Lithuanian former professional basketball player. Lukauskis holds numerous Lithuanian Basketball League records and is the league's all-time leading scorer.

== Professional career ==
Lukauskis began his basketball career in the Panevežys youth basketball clubs, being the leader there. He got attention from the LKL, and in 2001, he joined Sakalai. In 2002, he signed a one-year contract with Alytus, and he was the top scorer on the team. In 2003, he joined Lithuanian basketball giant Lietuvos Rytas. In 2006, Lukauskis improved his game and alongside Tomas Delininkaitis he gave Rytas a strong impact off the bench. In the 2007 season, he became a starting player.

In the EuroCup Final 8 on 4 April 2009, Lukauskis made a decisive, game-winning, 10 meters distance three-pointer and that allowed him to become the only player to participate in the EuroCup Final three times in total. He then went on to become the only two-time EuroCup champion. In July 2009, he joined the French League club ASVEL. In September 2010 he signed with the German EuroCup-Team Baskets Oldenburg.

After spending a season with Italy's Barcellona Sigma of Legadue, in September 2012 Lukauskis moved to Valencia Basket of the Liga ACB, replacing the injured Thomas Kelati.

On 7 August 2016, Lukauskis signed with his hometown club Lietkabelis Panevėžys.

On 19 July 2017, he returned to Lietuvos rytas Vilnius for his ninth season as the club member. During the 2018 Karaliaus Mindaugo taurė, Lukauskis being 38 years old surprisingly became the LKL Three-point Shootout champion. On 25 August 2018, Lukauskis signed with BC Prienai of the Lithuanian Basketball League.

On 15 October 2020, Lukauskis signed with BC Šiauliai until the end of the season.

On 19 August 2021, Lukauskis signed with Dzūkija Alytus. On 19 September 2021, at 42 years and 123 days of age, Lukauskis became the oldest player to appear in a game in the Lithuanian Basketball League history, surpassing the previous record set by Algimantas Pavilonis in 1996. On 6 December 2021, Lukauskis scored a career-high 33 points in a game against Nevėžis Kėdainiai, breaking his previous scoring record set in 2001. He finished the season averaging 11.9 points, 4.1 rebounds, 1.6 assists and 1.2 steals in 34 LKL games played.

On 9 August 2022, Lukauskis signed with BC Wolves of the Lithuanian Basketball League. On 25 July 2023, he parted ways with the club.

== National team career ==
Lukauskis was a member of the senior Lithuanian national team at the 2008 Summer Olympics in Beijing. On 16 August 2008, when Lithuania played against Croatia in the Olympics, Lukauskis helped Lithuania to win the game, by scoring 20 points.

== Career statistics ==
Legend
GP	Games played	GS	Games started	MPG	Minutes per game
FG%	Field-goal percentage	3P%	3-point field-goal percentage	FT%	Free-throw percentage
RPG	Rebounds per game	APG	Assists per game	SPG	Steals per game
BPG	Blocks per game	PPG	Points per game	PIR	Performance index rating
**Bold**	Career high

=== EuroLeague ===
Year	Team	GP	GS	MPG	FG%	3P%	FT%	RPG	APG	SPG	BPG	PPG	PIR
2005–06	Lietuvos Rytas	19	0	14.4	.380	.361	.652	**3.2**	.8	.8	.1	4.3	5.1
2007–08	Lietuvos Rytas	**20**	**18**	23.3	.423	**.365**	.744	2.6	2.1	1.5	.1	**8.4**	8.2
2009–10	ASVEL	10	10	30.1	**.469**	.273	**.800**	2.0	**3.1**	**2.3**	**.3**	8.1	**11.1**
Career		49	28	21.5	.423	.343	.728	2.7	1.8	1.4	.1	6.8	7.6

== Awards and achievements ==
- Baltic League President's Cup Winner: 2008
- 2× LKF Cup Winner: 2009, 2014
- 2× ULEB Cup (EuroCup) Champion: 2005, 2009
- 3× Baltic League Champion: 2006, 2007, 2009
- 2× LKL League Champion: 2006, 2009
- Match des champions Winner: 2009
- Semaine de As Cup Winner: 2010
