= Gilvydas Biruta =

Lithuanian basketball player

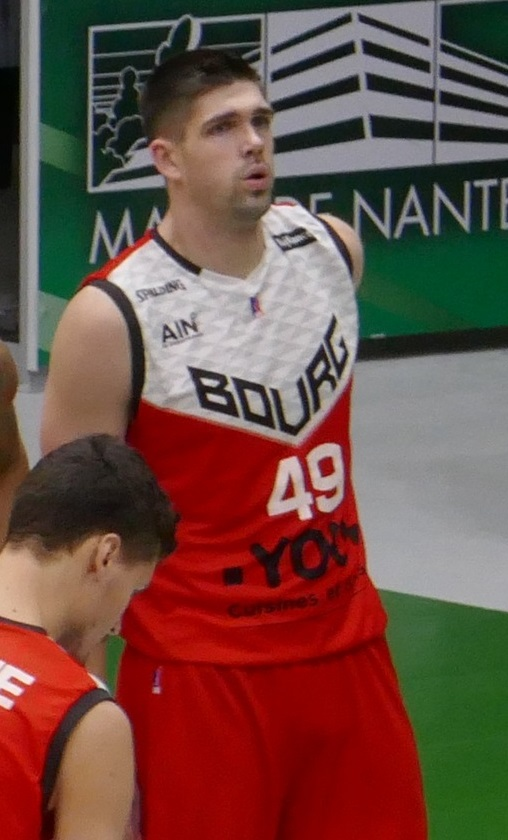
- Biruta in 2017

Grand Rapids Gold
- Title: Assistant coach
- League: NBA G League

Personal information
- Born: 10 October 1991 (age 35) Jonava, Lithuania
- Listed height: 6 ft 8 in (2.03 m)
- Listed weight: 236 lb (107 kg)

Career information
- High school: Saint Benedict's (Newark, New Jersey)
- College: Rutgers (2010–2012); Rhode Island (2013–2015)
- NBA draft: 2015: undrafted
- Playing career: 2015–2023
- Position: Power forward
- Coaching career: 2024–present

Career history

Playing
- 2015–2016: Neptūnas Klaipėda
- 2016: Lavrio
- 2016–2017: Aries Trikala
- 2017: Assigeco Piacenza
- 2017–2018: JL Bourg
- 2019: Cherkaski Mavpy
- 2020: Lietkabelis Panevėžys
- 2020: Heroes Den Bosch
- 2020–2021: CBet Prienai
- 2021–: CEP Lorient
- 2021–2022: Dax Gamarde basket 40
- 2022–2023: Vendée Challans Basket

Coaching
- 2024–present: Grand Rapids Gold (assistant)

Career highlights
- AAC All-Rookie Team (2011)
Medals
Men's basketball
Representing Lithuania
FIBA Europe Under-18 Championship
Silver medal – second place	2008 Greece	U-18 Team
FIBA Europe Under-16 Championship
Bronze medal – third place	2007 Greece	U-16 Team

Gilvydas Biruta (born 10 October 1991) is a Lithuanian former professional basketball player currently working as an assistant coach for the Grand Rapids Gold of the NBA G League. He used to play at the power forward position.

== Professional career ==
After graduating University of Rhode Island, Biruta was a part of Denver Nuggets during the 2015 NBA Summer League.

On 5 August 2015, Biruta signed with Neptūnas Klaipėda.

On 24 February 2016, Biruta signed with Lavrio of the Greek Basket League. In five games Biruta averaged 3.4 points and 2.2 rebounds. On August 30, 2016, he signed with Aries Trikala. In March 2017, he moved to Assigeco Piacenza of the Serie A2.

On 4 July 2017, Biruta signed with JL Bourg-en-Bresse of the Pro A.

Biruta played one game for Cherkaski Mavpy but left the team in January 2019 with an injury. On 5 January 2020, Biruta joined Lietkabelis Panevėžys. He averaged 4.3 points and 1.6 rebounds per game. On 18 September 2020, Biruta signed with Heroes Den Bosch of the Dutch Basketball League. He was released on 20 October after the DBL had been suspended due to a national spike in coronavirus infections.

== National team career ==
Biruta led the Lithuanian U-16 National Team to the bronze medals in the 2007 FIBA Europe Under-16 Championship by averaging 14.6 points, 8.0 rebounds, 1.8 steals and 1.3 blocks. He also been a part of Lithuanian U-18 team twice. First time he won silver medal with the Donatas Motiejūnas' led U-18 National Team. During his second appearance, Lithuanians finished fourth. Though, the successful youth national team years ended painfully when the U-20 team he represented suffered an fiasco, finishing only 14th in the 2011 FIBA Europe Under-20 Championship.

== Coaching career ==
On October 1, 2024, Biruta became an assistant coach for the Grand Rapids Gold of the NBA G League.
