= Žygimantas Janavičius =

Lithuanian basketball player (born 1989)

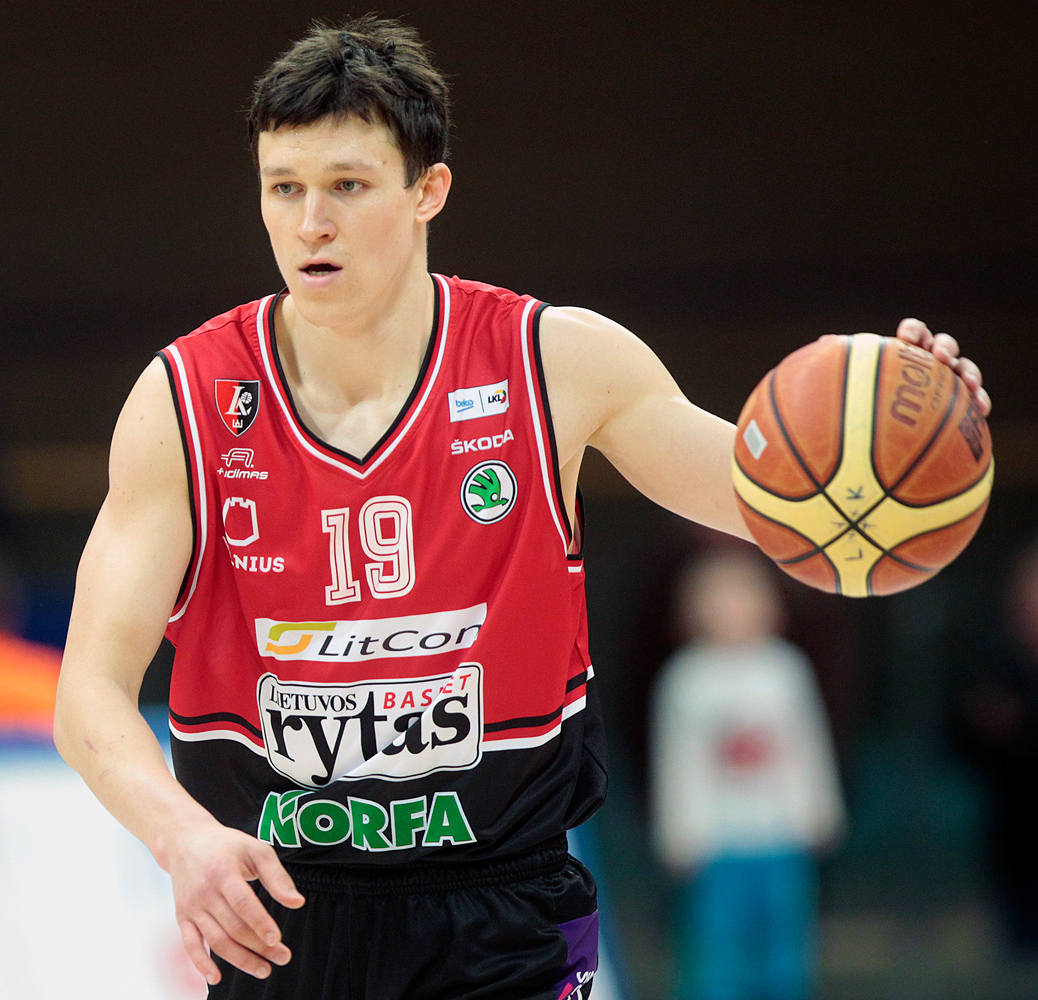
- Janavičius with Lietuvos rytas in 2015

Personal information
- Born: February 20, 1989 (age 37) Alytus, Lithuania
- Listed height: 6 ft 4 in (1.93 m)
- Listed weight: 187 lb (85 kg)

Career information
- NBA draft: 2011: undrafted
- Playing career: 2005–2025
- Position: Point guard

Career history
- 2005–2007: Alytus
- 2007–2012: Žalgiris Kaunas
- 2007–2008: →Žalgiris-Arvydas Sabonis school Kaunas
- 2010: →Aisčiai Kaunas
- 2010–2011: →Šiauliai
- 2011–2012: →Baltai Kaunas
- 2012–2014: Rūdupis Prienai
- 2014: Lietkabelis Panevėžys
- 2014–2016: Lietuvos rytas Vilnius
- 2016: → Lietkabelis Panevėžys
- 2016–2017: Lietkabelis Panevėžys
- 2017–2018: Basketball Löwen Braunschweig
- 2019: BC SkyCop Prienai
- 2019–2025: Neptūnas Klaipėda

Career highlights
- Nike Hoop Summit (2008); All-LKL Team (2019); LKL assists leader (2022); King Mindaugas Cup winner (2016); LKL champion (2012); NKL champion (2008)
Medals
Men's basketball
Representing Lithuania
FIBA Europe Under-20 Championship
Silver medal – second place	2008 Latvia	U-20 Team
FIBA Europe Under-18 Championship
Silver medal – second place	2006 Greece	U-18 Team

Žygimantas Janavičius (born February 20, 1989) is a Lithuanian former professional basketball player. Standing at 6 ft 4 in (1.93 m) tall and weighing 187 pounds (85 kg), he plays as a point guard.

== Professional career ==
In April 2008, Janavičius participated in the Nike Hoop Summit and scored 7 points for the Team World.

Janavičius made his pro debut with BC Alytus in 2005. He played two seasons with the club in the NKL.

In 2007, Janavičius signed with Žalgiris of Kaunas. He played one season for youth team, which were competing in NKL, and became the champion of the league. He played for BC Žalgiris in 2008–09, and half of the season in 2009–10, but because he was only given a small role on the team, he asked for to be loaned to Kauno Aisčiai, where he finished the season. In 2010–11, he played for BC Šiauliai. He started the 2011–2012 season with Kauno Baltai, but at the end of the season, he joined BC Žalgiris. After winning the championship of the LKL, he became a free agent.

In August 2012, he signed with Prienų Rūdupis.

== National team career ==
Janavičius won two silver medals while representing the Lithuanian youth squad in the 2006 FIBA Europe Under-18 Championship and the 2008 FIBA Europe Under-20 Championship. In 2014, coach Jonas Kazlauskas included Janavičius in the preliminary 24-player squad for the main Lithuania national basketball team, though he failed to compete for the spot in the national team's roster due to a broken palm. Janavičius was included in the candidates list once again in 2015. He did not make the EuroBasket 2015 roster either during his second try, when Lukas Lekavičius was taken instead of him less than a week before the championship began.

== Career statistics ==
Year	Team	League	GP	MPG	2P%	3P%	FT%	RPG	APG	SPG	BPG	PPG
2008–09	Žalgiris Kaunas	Euroleague	10	16.0	44.0	41.7	33.3	1.6	1.5	0.4	0.0	4.0
2009–10	Žalgiris Kaunas	Euroleague	7	6.9	20.0	00.0	50.0	0.1	0.6	0.1	0.0	0.4
2010–11	Šiauliai	Eurocup	6	26.8	35.7	31.6	62.5	3.5	3.7	1.0	0.0	8.0
2012–13	Rūdupis Prienai	Eurocup	6	23.3	56.3	12.5	52.2	4.2	3.2	1.2	0.0	9.0
