= Deividas Gailius =

Lithuanian basketball player (born 1988)

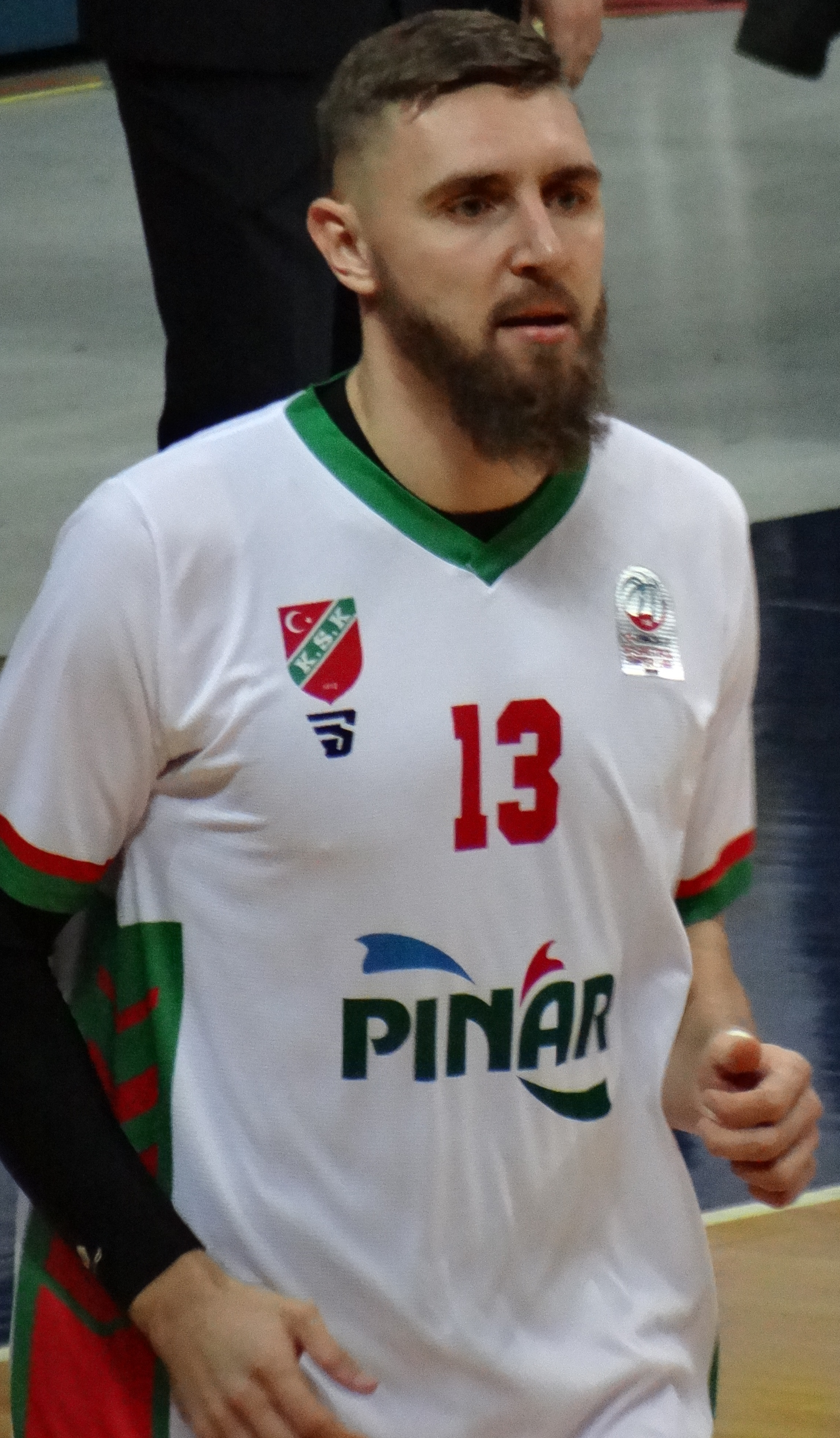
- Gailius with Pınar Karşıyaka in 2018

Personal information
- Born: April 26, 1988 (age 38) Klaipėda, Lithuanian SSR, Soviet Union
- Listed height: 6 ft 7 in (2.01 m)
- Listed weight: 202 lb (92 kg)

Career information
- NBA draft: 2010: undrafted
- Playing career: 2005–2026
- Position: Small forward / shooting guard

Career history
- 2005–2007: Nafta-Uni-Laivitė Klaipėda
- 2007–2009: Neptūnas
- 2009–2010: Šiauliai
- 2010–2012: Virtus Bologna
- 2012–2013: Neptūnas
- 2013–2014: Olimpija
- 2014–2015: Neptūnas
- 2015–2017: Lietuvos rytas
- 2017–2018: Burgos
- 2018–2019: Pınar Karşıyaka
- 2019–2020: Neptūnas
- 2020–2021: Baskets Bonn
- 2021–2025: Neptūnas
- 2025–2026: BC Gargždai

Career highlights
- King Mindaugas Cup winner (2016); All-LKL Team (2015); 2× LKL All-Star (2013, 2015); Slovenian Supercup champion (2013); NKL champion (2007)
Medals
Men's basketball
Representing Lithuania
EuroBasket
Silver medal – second place	2015 France–Croatia–Germany–Latvia

Deividas Gailius (né Daunys; April 26, 1988) is a Lithuanian former professional basketball player. Standing at 6 ft 7 in (2.01 m), he plays the small forward and shooting guard positions.

== Professional career ==
During the 2012–13 season with Neptūnas Klaipėda, Gailius averaged a career high of 17.0 points, 5.6 rebounds and 2.1 assists per game in the Lithuanian League. For the 2013–14 season he played with the Slovenian team Union Olimpija Ljubljana. In 16 EuroCup games played, Gailius averaged 16.1 points, 5.1 rebounds and 1.8 assists per game. In August 2014, he returned to Neptūnas, signing a one-year deal. In June 2015, he signed a two-year deal with Lietuvos rytas Vilnius. The seasons with Rytas were two of the worst in club history, finishing in only 3rd place in the Lithuanian championship, though in 2017, Gailius sealed the win against his former club Neptūnas. In August 2017, he signed a one-year deal with San Pablo Burgos of the Liga ACB.

Gailius spent the 2019–20 season with Neptūnas, averaging 16.6 points and 2.9 assists per game. On September 1, 2020, he signed with Baskets Bonn of the Basketball Bundesliga. In 19 games played for the German side, Gailius averaged 11.1 points, 2.9 rebounds and 1.5 assists per game.

On March 28, 2021, Gailius signed with Neptūnas to return one more time to the club. Gailius remained one of the top players with Neptūnas until his contract expired after the 2024–2025 season.

On August 15, 2025, he signed with BC Gargždai of the Lithuanian Basketball League. One of the team leaders, Gailius retired after the 2025–2026 season - his last game coming against his long-time team Neptūnas in the LKL playoffs.

== International career ==
Gailius played for Lithuania national team at the 2007 FIBA U-19 World Championship, finishing in 9th place. In 2014 coach Jonas Kazlauskas included Gailius in the preliminary 24-player list for the main Lithuania national basketball team. However, he did not make it into the final roster. In 2015 he was included in the extended candidates list once again. This time, he qualified into the main EuroBasket 2015 roster and won a silver medal. He was invited to the national team training camp in 2016 as well, but was released on July 14.

== Euroleague career statistics ==
Legend
GP	Games played	GS	Games started	MPG	Minutes per game
FG%	Field-goal percentage	3P%	3-point field-goal percentage	FT%	Free-throw percentage
RPG	Rebounds per game	APG	Assists per game	SPG	Steals per game
BPG	Blocks per game	PPG	Points per game	PIR	Performance index rating
**Bold**	Career high

Year	Team	GP	GS	MPG	FG%	3P%	FT%	RPG	APG	SPG	BPG	PPG	PIR
2014–15	Neptūnas	10	10	26.9	.470	.407	.600	4.8	2.5	1.3	.0	14.7	13.9
Career		10	10	26.9	.470	.407	.600	4.8	2.5	1.3	.0	14.7	13.9

== Personal life ==
In the summer of 2007, Gailius changed his surname from Daunys.
