= Adas Juškevičius =

Lithuanian basketball player (born 1989)

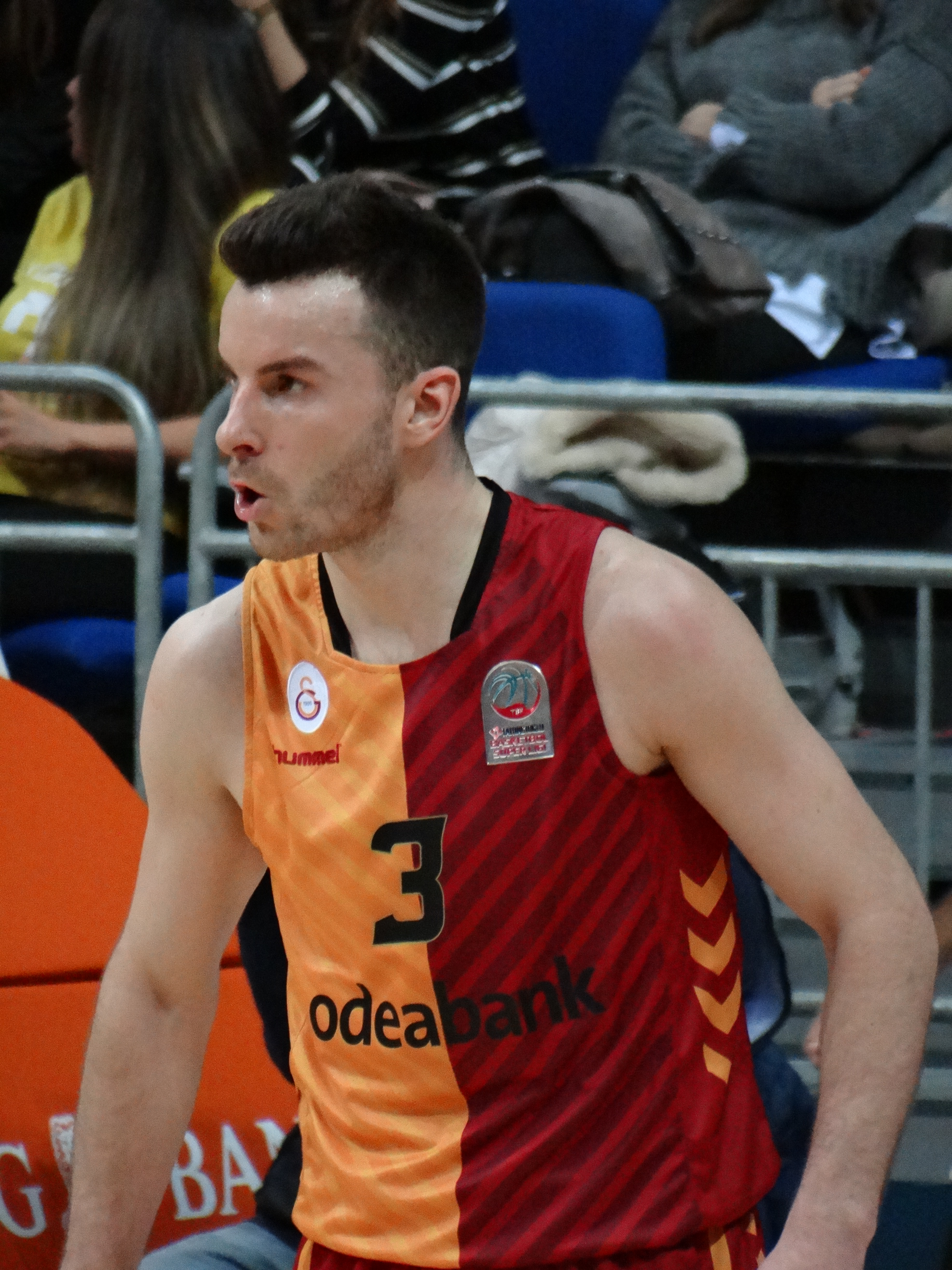
- Juškevičius with Galatasaray in 2018

KK Jurbarkas Karys
- Position: Shooting guard / point guard
- League: NKL

Personal information
- Born: 3 January 1989 (age 37) Kačerginė, Lithuania
- Listed height: 1.94 m (6 ft 4 in)
- Listed weight: 90 kg (198 lb)

Career information
- NBA draft: 2011: undrafted
- Playing career: 2005–present

Career history
- 2005–2014: Žalgiris Kaunas
- 2005–2008: →Žalgiris-Arvydas Sabonis School
- 2008–2009: →Aisčiai
- 2010–2012: →Rūdupis Prienai
- 2013–2014: →Eisbären Bremerhaven
- 2014–2016: Lietuvos rytas
- 2016–2017: Zaragoza
- 2017–2018: Lietkabelis
- 2018: Galatasaray
- 2018–2019: Nanterre 92
- 2019–2022: Parma
- 2022: Vanoli Cremona
- 2022–2024: BC Wolves
- 2024–2025: Stal Ostrów Wielkopolski
- 2025-2026: BC Astana
- 2026-present: Jurbarkas-Karys

Career highlights
- LKL champion (2013); LKL All-Star (2015); King Mindaugas Cup champion (2016); VTB United League All-Star (2020)
Medals
Men's basketball
Representing Lithuania
European U-20 Championship
Silver medal – second place	2008 Latvia	Team

Adas Juškevičius (born 3 January 1989) is a Lithuanian professional basketball player. He is a combo guard who stands 1.94 m (6 ft 4 1/2 in) tall.

== Professional career ==
=== Tecnyconta Zaragoza (2016–2017) ===
On 9 November 2016, Juškevičius signed with Tecnyconta Zaragoza of Liga ACB.

=== Lietkabelis Panevėžys (2017–2018) ===
On 23 July 2017, Juškevičius signed a one-year deal with Lietkabelis Panevėžys. On 19 January 2018, he parted ways with Lietkabelis in order to sign in Turkey.

=== Galatasaray (2018) ===
On 24 January 2018, he signed with Turkish club Galatasaray until the end of the 2018–19 season.

=== Nanterre 92 (2018–2019) ===
On 3 August 2018, Juškevičius joined Nanterre 92 of the French LNB Pro A.

=== Parma Basket (2019–2022) ===
On 2 August 2019, Juškevičius signed with Parma of the VTB United League. Juškevičius was selected to the 2020 VTB United League All-Star Game where he scored 12 points, grabbed 3 rebounds, dished out 1 assist and made 4 steals.

=== Vanoli Cremona (2022) ===
On 6 March 2022, Juškevičius signed with Vanoli Cremona of the Italian Lega Basket Serie A.

=== BC Wolves (2022–2024) ===
On 6 July 2022, he signed with BC Wolves of the Lithuanian Basketball League (LKL).

=== Stal Ostrów Wielkopolski (2024–2025) ===
On 6 November 2024, Juškevičius signed with Stal Ostrów Wielkopolski of the Polish Basketball League (PLK).

== National team career ==
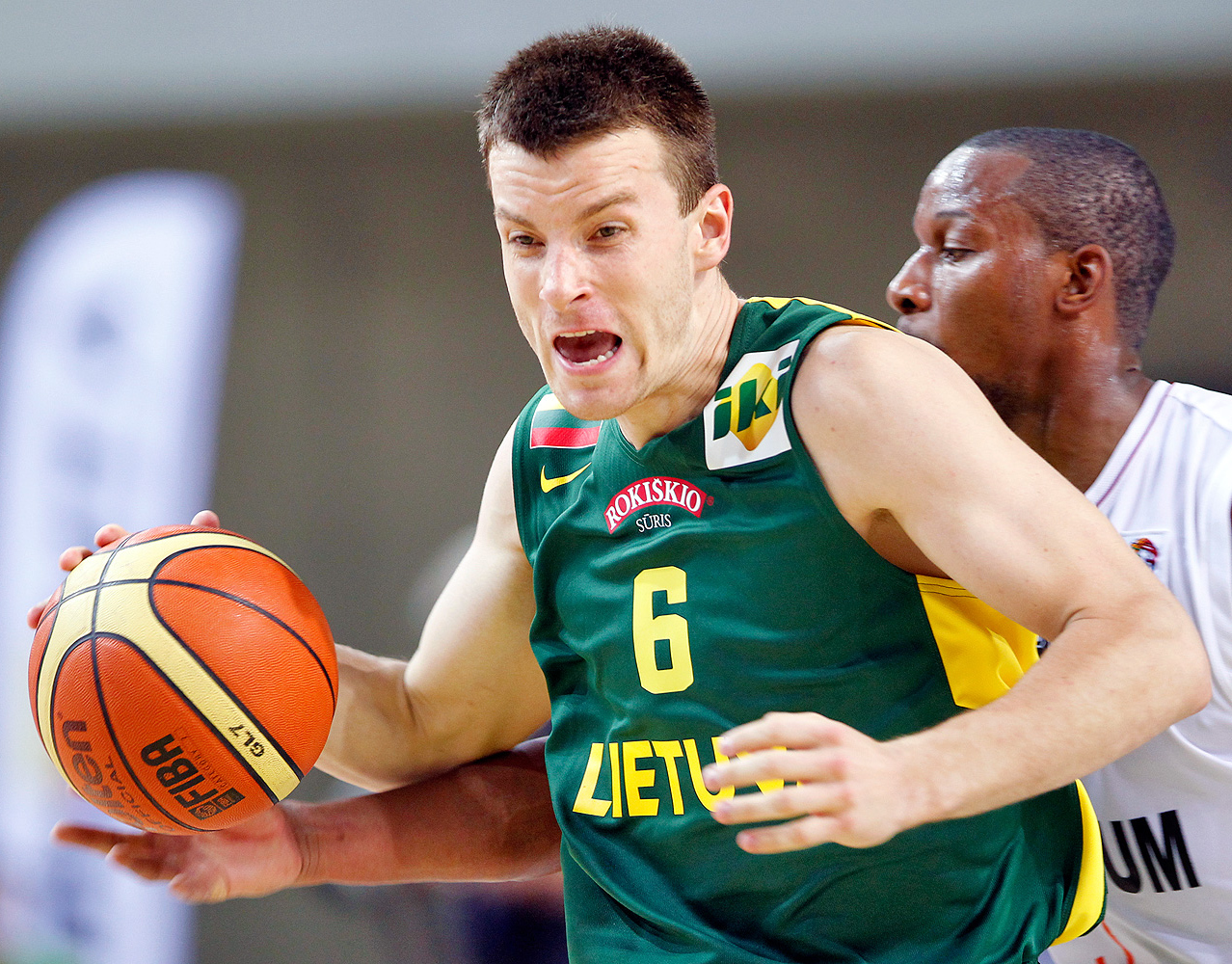
Adas Juškevičius with Lithuania in 2013

Juškevičius was on Lithuania national basketball team candidates list before EuroBasket 2013, but haven't made into the final roster. In 2014 coach Jonas Kazlauskas included Juškevičius into preliminary 24 players list for main Lithuania squad as well. Following Mantas Kalnietis injury, Juškevičius qualified into the main roster and represented Lithuania in 2014 FIBA Basketball World Cup. He also was included into the national team's candidates list in 2015, but was released on 25 August.
