= Kšyštof Lavrinovič =

Lithuanian basketball player (born 1979)

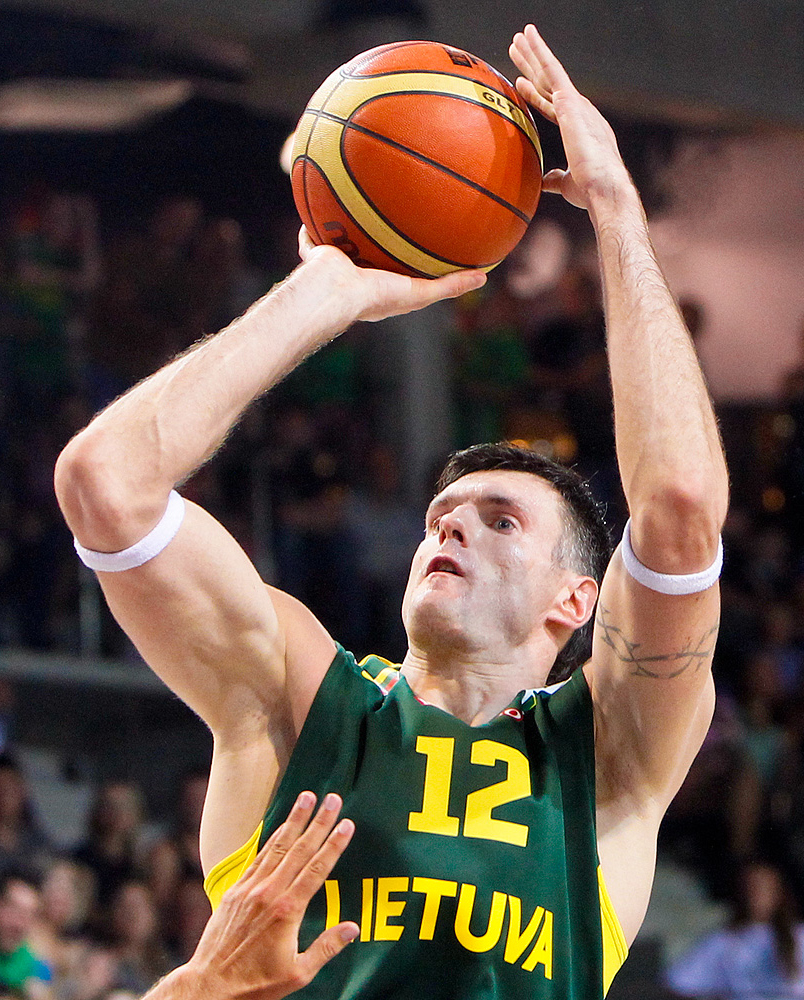
- Lavrinovič with Lithuania in 2014

Personal information
- Born: 1 November 1979 (age 47) Vilnius, Lithuania
- Listed height: 210 cm (6 ft 11 in)
- Listed weight: 108 kg (238 lb)

Career information
- NBA draft: 2001: undrafted
- Playing career: 1996–2022
- Position: Power forward / center

Career history
- 1996–2002: Alita
- 2002–2004: Ural Great Perm
- 2004–2005: Dynamo Moscow
- 2005–2007: UNICS Kazan
- 2007–2012: Montepaschi Siena
- 2012–2014: Žalgiris Kaunas
- 2014: Valencia
- 2014: Reggiana
- 2014–2016: Lietuvos rytas Vilnius
- 2016–2018: Lietkabelis Panevėžys
- 2018–2019: BC SkyCop Prienai
- 2019–2020: London City Royals
- 2020–2022: BC Vytis

Career highlights
- Russian Cup winner (2004); 2× All-EuroLeague Second Team (2008, 2011); Italian Cup MVP (2011); Italian SuperCup MVP (2011); 5× LBA champion (2008–2012); 5× Italian Cup winner (2008–2012); 2× LKL All-Star (2013, 2015); LKL All-Star Game Co-MVP (2013); EuroCup champion (2014); King Mindaugas Cup winner (2016); LKL All-Tournament Team (2017)

Kšyštof Lavrinovič (Polish: Krzysztof Ławrynowicz; born 1 November 1979) is a Lithuanian former professional basketball player. During his playing career, he played at the power forward and center positions. Lavrinovič was a two-time All-EuroLeague selection.

== Professional career ==
On 22 August 2018 Lavrinovič signed with BC Prienai of the Lithuanian Basketball League.

On 21 September 2019 he signed with the London City Royals of the British Basketball League.

On 19 January 2020 he signed with BC Vytis of the National Basketball League.

== National team career ==
Lavrinovič has also been a member of the men's Lithuanian national basketball team. Some of the tournaments he has played at with Lithuania's senior national team include: the EuroBasket 2003, the 2004 Summer Olympics, the EuroBasket 2005, the 2006 FIBA World Championship, the EuroBasket 2007, the 2008 Summer Olympics, the EuroBasket 2009, the EuroBasket 2011, the EuroBasket 2013, and the 2014 FIBA World Cup. He helped Lithuania win the gold medal at the EuroBasket 2003, the bronze medal at the EuroBasket 2007, and the silver medal at the EuroBasket 2013.

== Personal life ==
Lavrinovič is ethnically Polish. Lavrinovič has a twin-brother, Darjuš, whom he played with at UNICS Kazan in the Russian Superleague, as well as with on the senior men's Lithuanian national basketball team. Lavrinovič's wife is Miss Beauty of Russia 2004, Tatyana Sidorchuk. On 18 October 1998 Kšyštof Lavrinovič, his twin-brother Darjuš and their cousin raped at that time a seventeen-year-old girl. On 25 June 1999 the court sentenced the twin brothers for 5 years in prison and the cousin for 6 years in prison.

== Awards and accomplishments ==
=== Professional career ===
- 2× All-EuroLeague Second Team: (2008, 2011)
- Italian Cup MVP: (2011)
- Italian SuperCup MVP: (2011)

=== Lithuanian senior national team ===
- EuroBasket 2003: Gold
- EuroBasket 2007: Bronze
- EuroBasket 2013: Silver

== Career statistics ==
Legend
GP	Games played	GS	Games started	MPG	Minutes per game
FG%	Field-goal percentage	3P%	3-point field-goal percentage	FT%	Free-throw percentage
RPG	Rebounds per game	APG	Assists per game	SPG	Steals per game
BPG	Blocks per game	PPG	Points per game	PIR	Performance index rating
**Bold**	Career high

=== EuroLeague ===
*	Led the league

Year	Team	GP	GS	MPG	FG%	3P%	FT%	RPG	APG	SPG	BPG	PPG	PIR
2007–08	Mens Sana	22	2	20.6	**.609**	**.579***	.687	4.2	.5	1.5	**1.1**	12.7	15.5
2008–09	Mens Sana	17	1	24.3	.463	.340	.837	**6.4**	.8	**1.6**	.8	10.8	14.9
2009–10	Mens Sana	12	1	22.1	.455	.371	.764	4.3	1.1	1.3	.5	**13.2**	**16.3**
2010–11	Mens Sana	21	5	**24.7**	.458	.323	.753	5.0	**1.2**	.8	.3	11.8	13.3
2011–12	Mens Sana	15	1	19.5	.441	.444	.714	3.9	1.1	.7	.4	9.7	10.9
2012–13	Žalgiris	**24**	**9**	21.3	.493	.365	.825	4.0	1.0	.5	.3	8.5	10.3
2013–14	Žalgiris	13	0	17.5	.390	.231	**.875**	3.4	1.0	.4	.4	7.2	7.7
Career		124	19	21.6	.482	.389	.766	4.5	1.0	1.0	.5	10.6	12.7
