= Laimonas Kisielius =

Lithuanian basketball player (born 1985)

Personal information
- Born: 24 January 1985 (age 41) Vilnius, Lithuania
- Listed height: 6 ft 8 in (2.03 m)
- Listed weight: 216 lb (98 kg)

Career information
- High school: The Miller School of Albemarle (Charlottesville, Virginia)
- College: William & Mary (2004–2008)
- NBA draft: 2008: undrafted
- Playing career: 2008–2022
- Position: Small forward / power forward
- Number: 7

Career history
- 2008–2009: Ferro-ZNTU Zaporizhia
- 2009–2010: Lauvas Liepāja
- 2010–2011: Gloria Giants Düsseldorf
- 2011–2012: TrioBet Kėdainiai
- 2012–2013: Juventus Utena
- 2013–2014: Tonybet Prienai
- 2014–2015: Pieno žvaigždės Pasvalys
- 2015–2016: Vytautas Prienai-Birštonas
- 2016: Tsmoki Minsk
- 2016–2017: Lietuvos rytas Vilnius
- 2017–2019: Neptūnas Klaipėda
- 2019–2020: Pieno žvaigždės Pasvalys
- 2020–2022: CBet Jonava

Career highlights
- Third-team All-CAA (2008); CAA All-Rookie Team (2005)
Medals
Men's basketball
Representing Lithuania
FIBA Europe Under-20 Championship
Silver medal – second place	2005 Russia	Under-20

Laimonas Kisielius (born 24 January 1985) is a Lithuanian former professional basketball player.

== Playing career ==
On 30 December 2016, Kisielius signed with Lietuvos rytas Vilnius for the remainder of the 2016–17 season and the following 2017–18 season. On July 16, 2017, the team and Kisielius agreed to terminate contract for the 2017–18 season.

On July 27, 2017, Kisielius reached an agreement with Neptūnas Klaipėda and signed a two-year deal.

On August 9, 2019, Kisielius returned to Pieno žvaigždės Pasvalys.
