= Martynas Pocius =

Lithuanian basketball player and executive(born 1986)

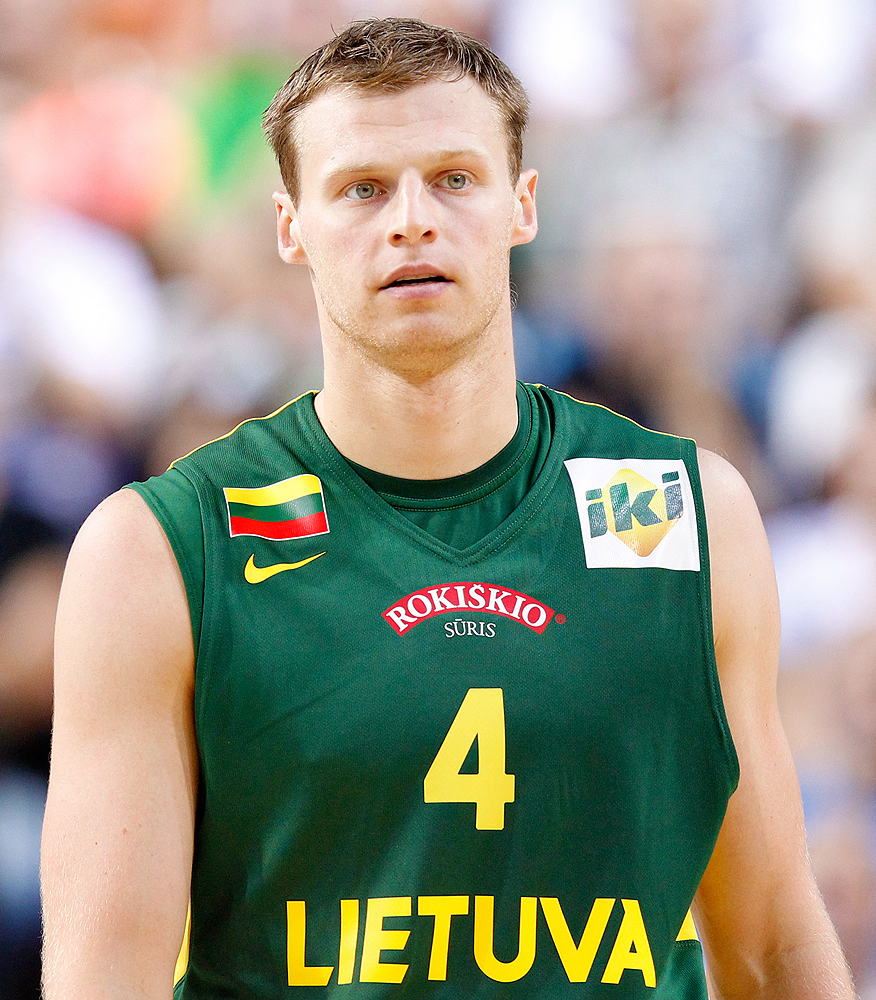
- Martynas Pocius representing Lithuania national team

Personal information
- Born: 28 April 1986 (age 40) Vilnius, Lithuania
- Listed height: 6 ft 5 in (1.96 m)
- Listed weight: 196 lb (89 kg)

Career information
- High school: Holderness School (Holderness, New Hampshire)
- College: Duke (2005–2009)
- NBA draft: 2009: undrafted
- Playing career: 2009–2017
- Position: Shooting guard / small forward

Career history
- 2009–2011: Žalgiris
- 2011–2013: Real Madrid
- 2013–2014: Žalgiris
- 2014–2015: Galatasaray
- 2015–2017: Žalgiris
- 2016–2017: → Murcia

Career highlights
- As player: 3× LKL champion (2011, 2014, 2016); 2× BBL champion (2010, 2011); LKF champion (2011); 3× LKL All-Star (2010, 2011, 2014); Liga ACB champion (2013); Copa del Rey winner (2012); Supercopa de España winner (2012); As executive: NBA champion (2023)

Martynas Pocius (born 28 April 1986) is a Lithuanian professional basketball executive and former player. He most recently served as the deputy general manager for Real Madrid of the Liga ACB and EuroLeague. He was also a member of the Lithuanian national basketball team.

== Early life ==
Martynas Pocius was born in Vilnius to Gintaras, a basketball coach, and Jūratė, a physical education teacher.

At age 13, he suffered a serious injury to his left hand, partially cutting three fingers with a grinder while at school. Two fingers were re-attached, while one had to be partially amputated.

Pocius attended the prestigious Holderness School in Plymouth, New Hampshire, where he played on the basketball team in his last two years, leading the team to back-to-back New England Prep School Class C titles. In his first title run, during the 2003–04 season, Pocius averaged 18 points and 4,5 rebounds, and led the team to a 17–7 record. In the 2004–05 season, Pocius averaged 18 points, 5 rebounds, 3 assists, and led the team to a 19–10 record.

As a senior, he was ranked 40th overall and 12th among shooting guards by Rivals.com and rated the 55th-top prospect (16th among shooting guards) by Scout.com. Pocius was also named to the World Select team for the 2005 Nike Hoops Summit, where he scored a game high 20 points in a 98–106 loss to the USA.

== College career ==
After graduating from high school, Pocius committed to Duke University, where he played on the university's basketball team, coached by Mike Krzyzewski.

As a freshman, Pocius appeared in 28 games, averaging 1.5 points and 0.3 rebounds in 6.1 minutes. In his sophomore year, Pocius increased his stats, averaging 1.9 points and 0.6 rebounds in 7.1 minutes in 27 games. Throughout the season he was battling an ankle injury, for which he missed four games. Pocius underwent a season-ending surgery on his left ankle on 8 January 2008, during his junior year. Due to the surgery he only played 4 games in which he averaged 4 points and 2.3 rebounds in 8 minutes. In his final season at Duke, Pocius played 22 games, averaging 1.5 points.

He graduated from Duke in 2009 with a degree in international comparative studies.

== Professional career ==
=== Žalgiris Kaunas (2009–2011) ===
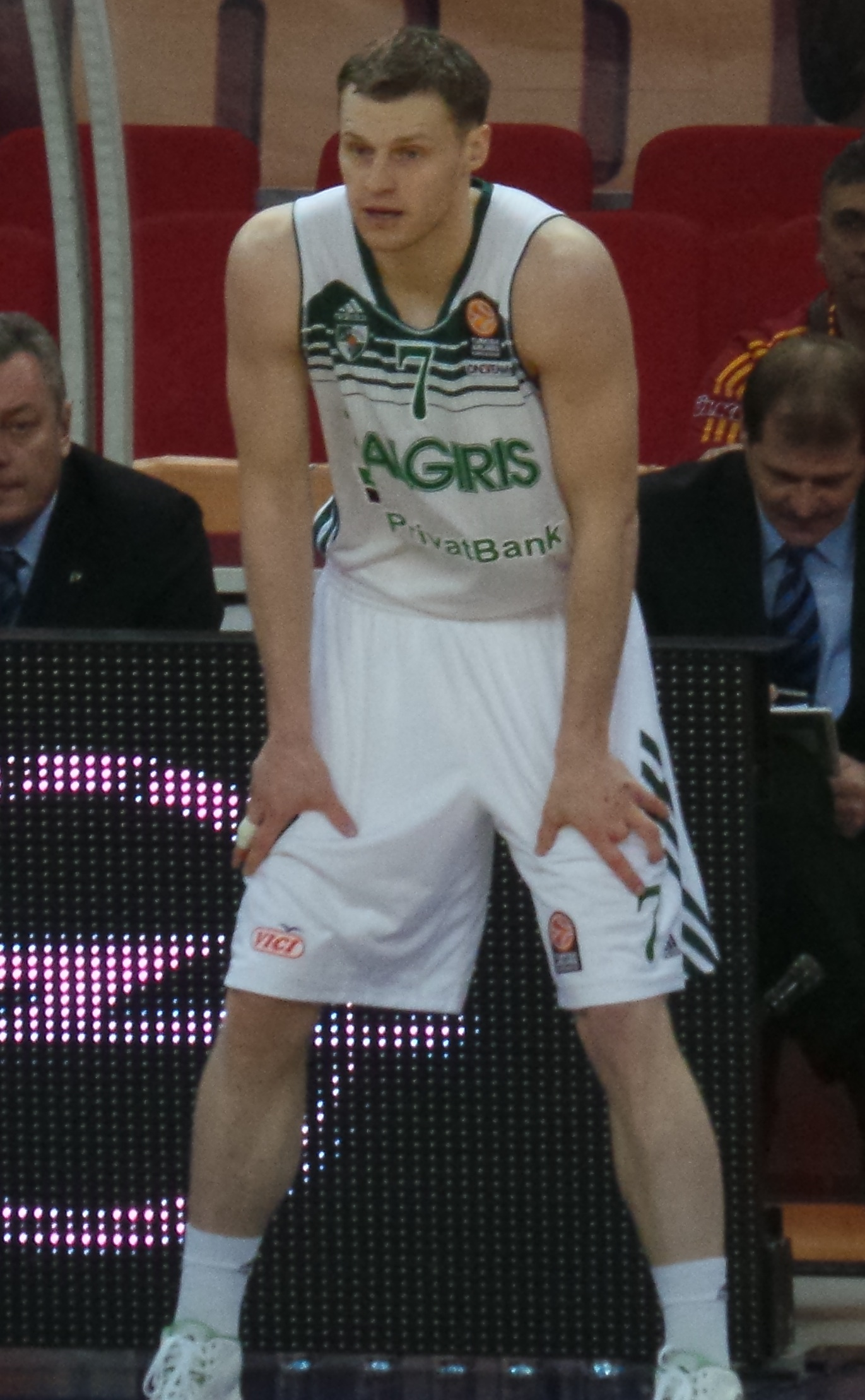
Pocius with Žalgiris jersey

After graduating from Duke, Pocius chose to continue his basketball career in Europe. He went back to his home country, Lithuania, and signed a multi-year contract with Žalgiris Kaunas.

In his debut season, Pocius averaged 8.1 points, 2.1 rebounds and 1.4 assists in 16 games in the EuroLeague. Although Žalgiris Kaunas did not pass the Top 16 round, the team did perform better in their national and regional championships. Pocius led the team to the Baltic Basketball League (BBL) title, averaging 10.7 points, 2.9 rebounds and 0.9 assists. He also led the team to a second place in Lietuvos krepšinio lyga (LKL), after losing the final's best-of-seven series 4–3. Pocius averaged 18.9 points, 2.6 rebounds and 1.8 assists in the season. Pocius also helped Žalgiris Kaunas win second place in the LKF Cup tournament and third place in the VTB United League.

During his second season with the team, Pocius led Žalgiris Kaunas to the Top 16 once more, but the team did move to the next round. Pocius averaged 10.9 points, 2.7 rebounds and 2.4 assists in 16 games during his second Euroleague season, improving every individual stat. Though, Žalgiris Kaunas went on to win the LKF Cup, the BBL title, and the LKL championship. Pocius missed the LKL finals due to a season-ending injury. He averaged 10.7 points, 2.1 rebounds and 2.1 assists throughout the season.

=== Real Madrid (2011–2013) ===
On 27 July 2011 it was announced that Pocius signed a contract with Real Madrid. Despite solid play in the first season with Real Madrid, his game declined in the second season, due to numerous injuries. He won the Copa del Rey de Baloncesto in 2012, and the Liga ACB in 2013. Pocius left Real Madrid in July 2013.

=== Žalgiris Kaunas (2013–2014) ===
Pocius returned to Žalgiris Kaunas in August 2013, signing a one-year deal. Pocius played solidly in the EuroLeague, helping the team reach the Top 16 stage despite suffering from injuries in the Top 16. Pocius finished the EuroLeague season averaging 10.8 points per game and helped Žalgiris Kaunas win the LKL championship, beating Lietuvos rytas Vilnius in the semifinals, and Neptūnas Klaipėda in the finals. Pocius left Žalgiris Kaunas in July 2014.

=== Galatasaray (2014–2015) ===
On 20 August 2014, Pocius officially signed a 1+1 contract with the Turkish team Galatasaray Istanbul. He averaged 6,2 points in the Euroleague competition.

=== Žalgiris Kaunas (2015–2017) ===
On 29 July 2015, Pocius returned to Žalgiris Kaunas, signing a 1+1 contract. After a difficult season where Pocius struggled with injuries and playing, and helping Žalgiris Kaunas to another LKL championship, he was loaned to UCAM Murcia.

On 16 June 2017, Pocius announced his retirement from professional basketball being just 31 years old due to injuries and pain he suffered while exercising.

== Post-playing career ==
Shortly after retiring Pocius joined the Denver Nuggets of the National Basketball Association (NBA) as a basketball operations associate in August 2017. On 15 February 2019, Pocius signed a multi-year contract extension with the Nuggets.

On August 28, 2025, Pocius left the Nuggets to serve as the deputy general manager for Real Madrid of the Liga ACB and EuroLeague.

== National team career ==
Pocius has played for Lithuania national teams in several tournaments. He played in the 2004 European U-18 Championship in Spain, where he showed himself as a team leader, averaging 26 points, 3 rebounds and 2.3 assists. Pocius also represented Lithuania at the 2006 European U-20 Championship in Turkey, where he led the team to a seventh-place finish, averaging 20 points per game. After his senior year at Duke, Pocius represented Lithuania at the 2009 Summer Universiade in Belgrade, Serbia, where he led the team to a fifth-place finish, averaging 13.5 points, 5.8 rebounds and 1.3 assists.

In 2010, Pocius made his debut with the Lithuanian men's national team at the 2010 FIBA World Championship in Turkey, where he was one of the leaders of the team and helped lead them to the bronze medals.

== State awards ==
- Lithuania: Recipient of the Knight's Cross of the Order of the Lithuanian Grand Duke Gediminas (2010)
- Lithuania: Recipient of the Officer's Cross of the Order for Merits to Lithuania (2013)

== Career statistics ==
Legend
GP	Games played	GS	Games started	MPG	Minutes per game
FG%	Field-goal percentage	3P%	3-point field-goal percentage	FT%	Free-throw percentage
RPG	Rebounds per game	APG	Assists per game	SPG	Steals per game
BPG	Blocks per game	PPG	Points per game	PIR	Performance index rating
**Bold**	Career high

=== Euroleague ===
Year	Team	GP	GS	MPG	FG%	3P%	FT%	RPG	APG	SPG	BPG	PPG	PIR
2009–10	Žalgiris	16	2	19.3	**.417**	**.383**	.727	2.1	1.4	**.6**	**.3**	8.1	6.3
2010–11	Žalgiris	16	8	**23.9**	.396	.300	.708	2.7	2.3	.4	.1	**10.9**	8.3
2011–12	Real Madrid	14	1	15.2	.400	.250	.903	1.6	.9	.2	.1	7.4	5.5
2012–13	Real Madrid	12	0	10.2	.371	.211	**1.000**	.8	.3	.3	.0	3.2	2.2
2013–14	Žalgiris	**20**	**17**	23.2	.416	.358	.780	**2.9**	**2.5**	.4	.1	10.8	**9.3**
2014–15	Galatasaray	19	7	20.6	.376	.317	.767	1.7	1.4	.3	.1	6.2	4.3
2015–16	Žalgiris	19	5	14.1	.343	.192	.667	1.8	.8	.1	.0	3.4	1.8
Career		116	40	18.5	.395	.313	.764	2.0	1.4	.3	.1	7.3	5.5
