= Renaldas Seibutis =

Lithuanian basketball player (born 1985)

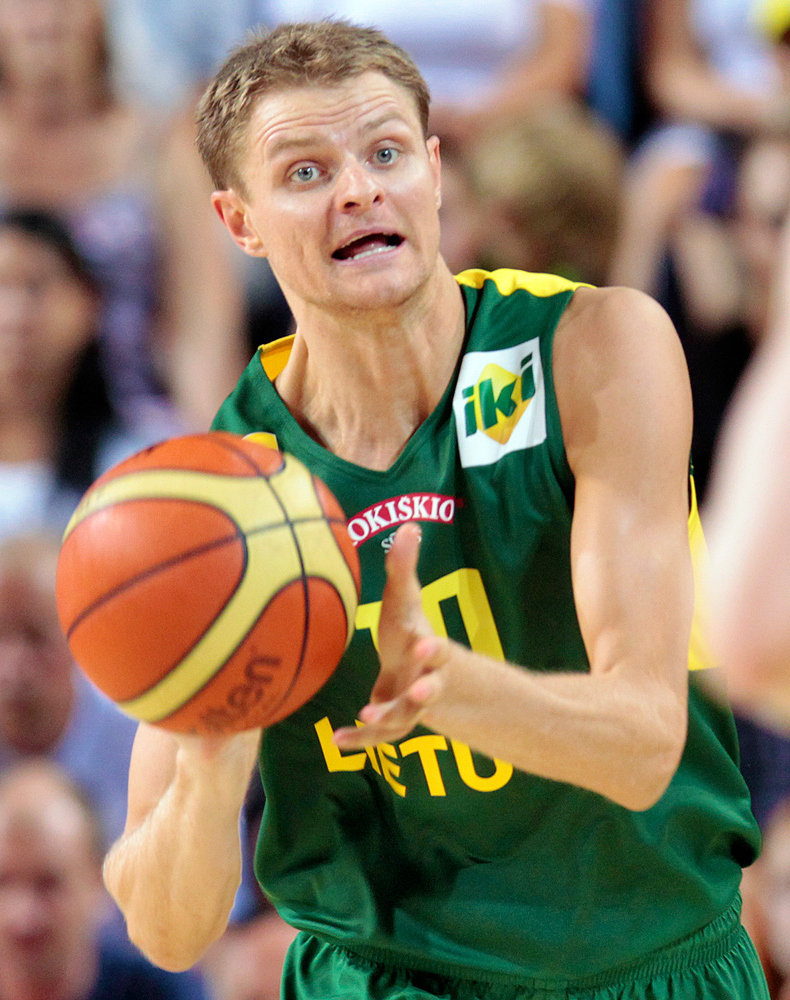
- Seibutis with Lithuania in 2013

Žalgiris Kaunas
- Title: Assistant coach
- League: LKL; EuroLeague

Personal information
- Born: July 23, 1985 (age 41) Palanga, Lithuania
- Listed height: 6 ft 5 in (1.96 m)
- Listed weight: 181 lb (82 kg)

Career information
- NBA draft: 2007: 2nd round, 50th overall pick
- Drafted by: Dallas Mavericks
- Playing career: 2002–2020
- Position: Shooting guard
- Number: 10, 8, 4
- Coaching career: 2023–present

Career history

Playing
- 2002–2003: Naglis Palanga
- 2003–2005: Sakalai Vilnius
- 2005–2008: Olympiacos
- 2006–2007: →Maroussi Honda
- 2008–2010: Bilbao Basket
- 2010–2011: Olin Edirne
- 2011–2014: Lietuvos rytas Vilnius
- 2014–2015: Darüşşafaka
- 2015–2017: Žalgiris Kaunas
- 2017–2018: Neptūnas Klaipėda
- 2018–2020: Zaragoza

Coaching
- 2023–2024: Olimpas Palanga (assistant)
- 2024–2025: Žalgiris Kaunas (player development)
- 2025–present: Žalgiris Kaunas (assistant)

Career highlights
- All-EuroCup First Team (2012); 2× LKL champion (2016, 2017); 3× LKL All-Star (2012–2014); King Mindaugas Cup winner (2017); FIBA Under-21 World Championship MVP (2005)
- Stats at Basketball Reference
Medals
Men's basketball
Representing Lithuania
FIBA World Cup
Bronze medal – third place	2010 Turkey
EuroBasket
Silver medal – second place	2013 Slovenia
Silver medal – second place	2015 France–Croatia–Germany–Latvia
FIBA Under-21 World Cup
Gold medal – first place	2005 Argentina	Under-21
FIBA Europe Under-20 Championship
Silver medal – second place	2005 Russia	Under-20

Renaldas Seibutis (born July 23, 1985) is a Lithuanian former professional basketball player. He represented the senior Lithuanian national team internationally. He currently serves as an assistant coach of Žalgiris Kaunas.

== Professional career ==
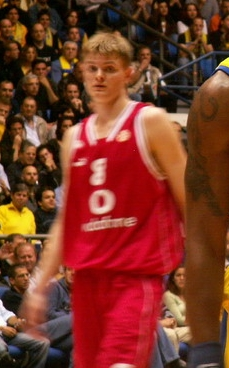
Seibutis with Olympiacos Piraeus

=== Europe ===
In the 2010–11 season, Seibutis played for Olin Edirne Basketbol of the Turkish Basketbol Süper Ligi (BSL), where he was one of the team's leaders, averaging 18.6 points, 3.5 rebounds, 4.5 assists and 1.6 steals per game.

On 12 June 2011, Seibutis signed a three-year (2+1) contract with the Lithuanian team Lietuvos rytas.

In July 2014, he signed a contract with Turkish team Darüşşafaka Doğuş.

On 4 September 2015, Seibutis signed a one-year contract (with an option for another) with the Lithuanian club Žalgiris Kaunas.

On 21 July 2017, Seibutis signed with Neptūnas Klaipėda for the 2017–18 season.

On 17 July 2018, Seibutis signed a two-year deal with Zaragoza of the Liga ACB.

On 11 August 2021, Seibutis officially announced his retirement from professional basketball, after having played his last game in 2019.

=== NBA ===
Seibutis was drafted in the second round with the 50th overall pick of the 2007 NBA draft by the Dallas Mavericks. Following the draft selection, he played with the Mavericks' NBA Summer League team in Las Vegas, averaging 6 points, 1 rebound, 1.6 assists, while shooting over 47% in 13 minutes per game over 5 games. He played again in 2008, averaging only 2 points in 10.9 minutes per game over 5 games. He was ultimately dropped from the 2008 roster because of his underperforming.

On 23 July 2018, the draft rights to Seibutis, along with Johnathan Motley, was traded to the Los Angeles Clippers in exchange for the draft rights to Maarty Leunen and cash considerations. On 7 August 2018, the draft rights to Seibutis, along with Sam Dekker, were traded to the Cleveland Cavaliers in exchange for the draft rights to Vladimir Veremeenko.

== National team career ==
At the 2010 FIBA World Championship Seibutis played for the Lithuanian national basketball team, which won bronze medals. He also participated in his first Olympic Games in London 2012.

== Career statistics ==
Legend
GP	Games played	GS	Games started	MPG	Minutes per game
FG%	Field-goal percentage	3P%	3-point field-goal percentage	FT%	Free-throw percentage
RPG	Rebounds per game	APG	Assists per game	SPG	Steals per game
BPG	Blocks per game	PPG	Points per game	PIR	Performance index rating
**Bold**	Career high

=== EuroLeague ===
Year	Team	GP	GS	MPG	FG%	3P%	FT%	RPG	APG	SPG	BPG	PPG	PIR
2005–06	Olympiacos	23	3	17.8	.440	.303	.821	1.9	.6	.6	.0	6.3	4.6
2007–08	Olympiacos	3	0	2.9	.000	.000	.000	.3	.3	.3	.0	.0	.7
2012–13	Lietuvos rytas	10	10	**30.2**	**.449**	.321	**.917**	**3.6**	2.3	**1.2**	.0	**12.9**	**10.9**
2013–14	Lietuvos rytas	10	5	26.7	.404	**.423**	.909	2.5	**3.2**	1.2	.0	10.7	9.4
2015–16	Žalgiris	21	**17**	22.3	.414	.319	.822	2.3	1.5	.2	**.1**	8.0	4.7
2016–17	Žalgiris	**30**	9	12.4	.342	.208	.760	1.3	.9	.3	**.1**	2.5	1.5
Career		97	44	18.9	.414	.314	.837	1.9	1.3	.6	.1	6.4	4.7

== State awards ==
- Lithuania: Recipient of the Knight's Cross of the Order of the Lithuanian Grand Duke Gediminas (2010)
- Lithuania: Recipient of the Officer's Cross of the Order for Merits to Lithuania (2013)
