= Eurocup 2014–15 Regular Season Group M =

Standings and Results for Group M of the Last 32 phase of the 2014–15 Eurocup basketball tournament.

== Standings ==
| Pos | Team | Pld | W | L | PF | PA | PD | KSK | PLV | BJK | NEP |
|---|---|---|---|---|---|---|---|---|---|---|---|
| 1 | (Turkey) Pınar Karşıyaka | 6 | 6 | 0 | 538 | 463 | +75 | | 86–79 | 73–64 | 99–85 |
| 2 | (France) Paris-Levallois | 6 | 3 | 3 | 485 | 486 | −1 | 75–85 | | 93–83 | 88–79 |
| 3 | (Turkey) Beşiktaş Integral Forex | 6 | 2 | 4 | 444 | 488 | −44 | 77–105 | 71–77 | | 80–78 |
| 4 | (Lithuania) Neptūnas | 6 | 1 | 5 | 469 | 499 | −30 | 83–90 | 82–73 | 62–69 | |

Source: Euroleague Basketball;
