= 2015 LKF Cup =

The 2015 LKF Cup was the 9th edition of this annual competition between Lithuanian basketball clubs held 20–22 February in Kaunas. Žalgiris Kaunas won its fifth title three years after its last one.

== Participating teams ==
- Žalgiris Kaunas
- Lietuvos rytas Vilnius
- Neptūnas Klaipėda
- BC Šiauliai
- Juventus Utena
- Pieno žvaigždės Pasvalys
- Dzūkija Alytus
- Lietkabelis Panevėžys

== Bracket ==
Quarter-finals
20 February
Juventus	82
Pieno žvaigždės	76
20 February
Žalgiris	86
Lietkabelis	58
20 February
Lietuvos rytas	78
Dzūkija	63
20 February
Neptūnas	71
Šiauliai	73

Semi-finals
21 February
Juventus	65
Žalgiris	91
21 February
Lietuvos rytas	71
Šiauliai	61

Final
February 22
Žalgiris	82
Lietuvos rytas	76
Third place
February 22
Juventus	62
Šiauliai	77

=== Quarterfinals ===
20 February 2015	BC Juventus	82–76	BC Pieno žvaigždės	Žalgiris Arena, Kaunas
13:00	Scoring by quarter: 16–16, 16–28, 30–14, 20–18
	Pts: A. Šikšnius 22; Rebs: 2 players 6 Asts: R. Broadus 5	Report	Pts: E. Kairys 14; Rebs: 3 players 6 Asts: 2 players 4	Attendance: 300

20 February 2015	BC Lietuvos rytas	78–63	BC Dzūkija	Žalgiris Arena, Kaunas
15:30	Scoring by quarter: 20–18, 18–17, 22–10, 18–18
	Pts: A. Juškevičius 19; Rebs: M. Moser 6 Asts: M. Gecevičius 8	Report	Pts: F. Dmitriev 13; Rebs: A. Lapeta 9 Asts: A. Jomantas 4	Attendance: 450

20 February 2015	BC Šiauliai	73–71	BC Neptūnas	Žalgiris Arena, Kaunas
18:00	Scoring by quarter: 17–14, 16–23, 20–16, 20–18
	Pts: J. Jucikas 15; Rebs: R. Olander 7 Asts: R. Alijevas 6	Report	Pts: M. Mažeika 20; Rebs: V. Šarakauskas 8 Asts: M. Shakur 3	Attendance: 400

20 February 2015	BC Žalgiris	86–58	BC Lietkabelis	Žalgiris Arena, Kaunas
20:30	Scoring by quarter: 22–8, 27–18, 14–23, 23–9
	Pts: A. Gudaitis 16; Rebs: A. Gudaitis 6 Asts: T. Dimša 4	Report	Pts: J. Žuža 17; Rebs: J. Žuža 9 Asts: J. Vladović 5	Attendance: 1216

=== Semifinals ===
21 February 2015	BC Lietuvos rytas	71–61	BC Šiauliai	Žalgiris Arena, Kaunas
18:00	Scoring by quarter: 20–22, 19–8, 17–27, 14–5
	Pts: G. Orelikas 18; Rebs: A. Valeika 8 Asts: B. Baron 4	Report	Pts: R. Giedraitis 13; Rebs: G. Leonavičius 6 Asts: R. Alijevas 5	Attendance: 1700

21 February 2015	BC Juventus	65–91	BC Žalgiris	Žalgiris Arena, Kaunas
20:30	Scoring by quarter: 19–31, 15–17, 14–21, 17–22
	Pts: R. Broadus 12; Rebs: N. Barinov 8 Asts: O. Varanauskas 5	Report	Pts: A. Milaknis 19; Rebs: 3 players 5 Asts: W. Cherry 7	Attendance: 2153

=== Third Place ===
21 February 2015	BC Juventus	62–77	BC Šiauliai	Žalgiris Arena, Kaunas
18:00	Scoring by quarter: 24–13, 18–21, 10–20, 10–23
	Pts: A. Šikšnius 16; Rebs: S. Kulvietis 9 Asts: R. Broadus 7	Report	Pts: J. Jucikas 21; Rebs: R. Olander 8 Asts: R. Alijevas 7	Attendance: 3110

=== Final ===
22 February 2015
20:30

Report

Žalgiris	82–76	Lietuvos rytas
Scoring by quarter: 16–21, 30–11, 13–21, 23–23
Pts: E. Ulanovas 16; Rebs: E. Ulanovas 6 Asts: J. Anderson 5		Pts: A. Kavaliauskas 18; Rebs: A. Kavaliauskas 8 Asts: Ž. Janavičius 4

Žalgiris Arena, Kaunas
Attendance: 5,215

Žalgiris	Lietuvos rytas

MVP
(Lithuania) Edgaras Ulanovas
Game rules
Game was played under FIBA rules.

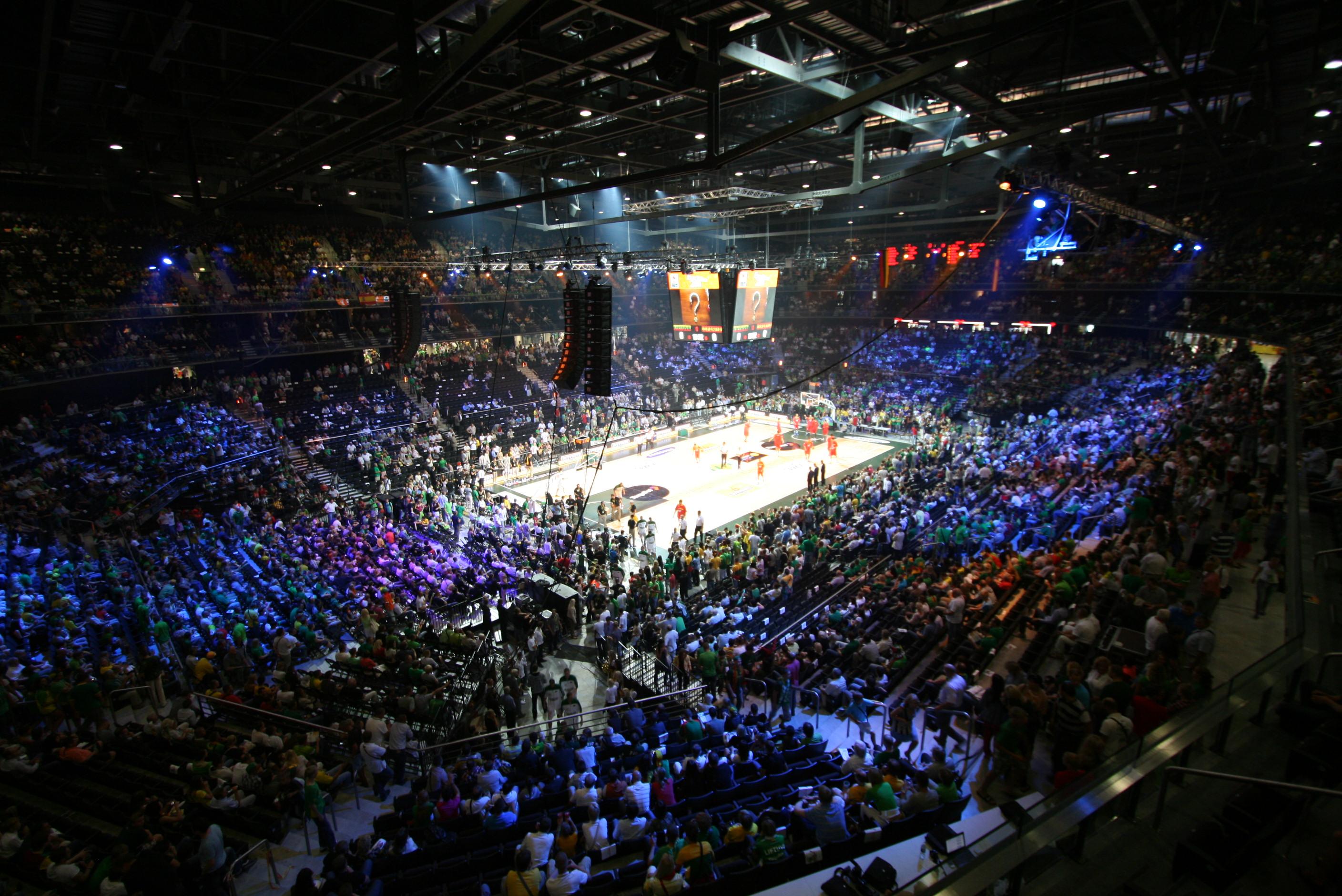
Žalgiris Arena

2015 LFK Cup Winners
BC Žalgiris
(5th title)
