= Michailas Anisimovas =

Ukrainian-Lithuanian basketball player

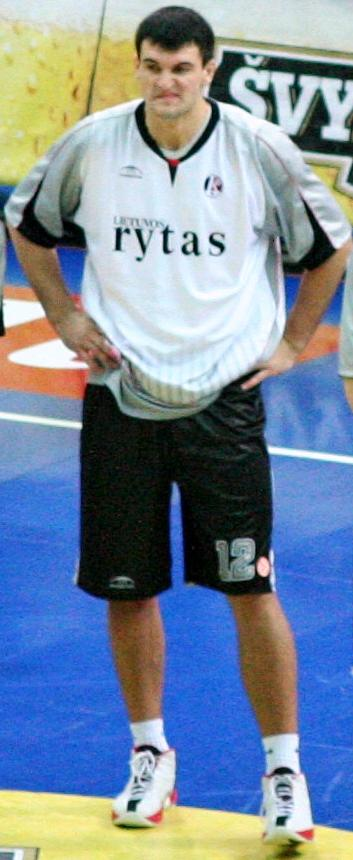
- Michailas Anisimovas with Lietuvos rytas Vilnius.

Personal information
- Born: October 11, 1984 (age 42) Kyiv, Ukrainian SSR, Soviet Union
- Listed height: 7 ft 1 in (2.16 m)
- Listed weight: 265 lb (120 kg)

Career information
- NBA draft: 2006: undrafted
- Playing career: 2002–present
- Position: Center

Career history
- 2002–2003: Atletas Kaunas
- 2003–2005: Šiauliai
- 2005–2006: Barons LMT
- 2006–2007: Neptūnas Klaipėda
- 2007–2009: Lietuvos rytas Vilnius
- 2009–2014: Budivelnyk Kyiv
- 2014: Neptūnas Klaipėda
- 2014–2015: Budivelnyk Kyiv
- 2015: Ventspils
- 2015–2016: Dynamo Kyiv
- 2016–2021: Budivelnyk Kyiv

Career highlights
- LKL All-Star (2007); LKL champion (2009); BBL champion (2009); Eurocup champion (2009); UBL champion (2011, 2013, 2014, 2017); Ukrainian Basketball Cup champion (2012, 2014, 2015)
Medals
Men's basketball
Representing Lithuania
FIBA Under-21 World Championship
Gold medal – first place	2005 Argentina	National Team
FIBA Europe Under-20 Championship
Bronze medal – third place	2004 Czech Republic	National Team

Michailas Anisimovas (born October 11, 1984) is a Ukrainian–Lithuanian professional basketball player.

== Lietuvos Rytas ==
After an impressive season in Klaipėda, he was signed by Lietuvos rytas in 2007. He was initially expected to develop his game to higher level to become one of the better centers in Lithuania, but failed to impress the head coach and was receiving only a few minutes per game. He improved his statistics in the 2008/2009 season, and became a more reliable bench player. In September 2009 he was signed by Budivelnyk Kyiv.

== Personal life ==
Michailas Anisimovas currently holds a dual Lithuanian and Ukrainian citizenship.

== Awards and achievements ==
- Baltic Basketball League Presidents Cup winner: 2008
- LKF Cup winner: 2009
- UBL best center of the season: 2015
