= Vidas Ginevičius =

Lithuanian basketball player (born 1978)

BC Gargždai
- Title: Assistant coach
- League: LKL

Personal information
- Born: 11 May 1978 (age 48) Kaunas, Lithuanian SSR, Soviet Union
- Listed height: 6 ft 4 in (1.93 m)
- Listed weight: 205 lb (93 kg)

Career information
- Playing career: 1997–2015
- Position: Point guard

Career history

Playing
- 1997–2000: Statyba Jonava
- 2000–2007: Žalgiris Kaunas
- 2001: →Neptūnas Klaipėda
- 2003–2004: →BC Alita
- 2007–2009: Spartak Primorye
- 2009–2010: Lietuvos rytas Vilnius
- 2010–2011: Olin Edirne Basket
- 2011–2012: Triobet Kėdainiai
- 2012–2013: Lietkabelis Panevėžys
- 2013: BC Tsmoki-Minsk
- 2013–2014: Nevėžis Kėdainiai
- 2014–2015: Žalgiris-2

Coaching
- 2015–2018: Žalgiris-2 (assistant)
- 2018–2021: BC Juventus (assistant)
- 2021-2022: Labas Gas Prienai (assistant)
- 2021: Labas Gas Prienai (interim)
- 2022–2025: Neptūnas Klaipėda (assistant)
- 2025: Neptūnas Klaipėda (interim)
- 2025–present: BC Gargždai (assistant)

Career highlights
- 5× LKL champion (2003–2005, 2007, 2010); 2× LKL All-Star (2006, 2011)

Vidas Ginevičius (born 11 May 1978) is a Lithuanian professional basketball coach and former player. He is currently an assistant coach for BC Gargždai of the Lithuanian Basketball League (LKL). Standing at 1.93 m (6 ft 4 in) and weighing 93 kg (205 lb), he played at the point guard position.

== Pro career ==
His career started in 1999, when he started to play for Statyba (Jonava). In the 2000–2001 season he played for Zalgiris, but he moved during the season to Neptūnas. In 2001, he came back to Žalgiris, who loaned him for the 2003 season to Alytus. In March 2004, he left the team due to the clubs' financial problems and he came back to Žalgiris, but only for Lithuanian League games.

He has played in 19 games in the EuroLeague, during the 2004–05 Euroleague season.

== Lithuanian national team ==
In 2004, he represented the colors and country of Lithuania, when he played for the Lithuanian national basketball team at the 2004 Olympic Basketball Tournament. He also played with Lithuania's national team in 6 games at the 2005 European Championship, which was held at Belgrade.

== Career statistics ==
Legend
GP	Games played	GS	Games started	MPG	Minutes per game
FG%	Field-goal percentage	3P%	3-point field-goal percentage	FT%	Free-throw percentage
RPG	Rebounds per game	APG	Assists per game	SPG	Steals per game
BPG	Blocks per game	PPG	Points per game	PIR	Performance index rating
**Bold**	Career high

=== Euroleague ===
Year	Team	GP	GS	MPG	FG%	3P%	FT%	RPG	APG	SPG	BPG	PPG	PIR
2000–01	Žalgiris	1	0	21.0	.000	.000	.000	2.0	1.0	1.0	.0	.0	2.0
2001–02	Žalgiris	10	**8**	18.1	.400	.100	.684	1.2	2.2	1.4	.1	3.6	4.6
2002–03	Žalgiris	13	1	18.0	.647	.371	.677	1.2	.8	1.2	.0	6.3	6.4
2004–05	Žalgiris	**19**	**8**	**25.1**	.586	.377	.733	**1.7**	**2.6**	**1.9**	.0	**6.7**	**6.9**
2005–06	Žalgiris	**19**	4	24.1	.520	.377	.725	1.6	1.7	1.8	**.2**	6.1	6.6
2006–07	Žalgiris	14	5	17.3	**.667**	.286	.389	.8	1.3	1.0	.0	3.1	2.6
2009–10	Lietuvos Rytas	4	1	6.4	.000	**.400**	**.1000**	.5	1.0	.0	.0	2.0	1.5

== Awards and achievements ==
- Lithuanian League (LKL) Champion – 2003, 2004, 2005, 2007, 2010
- Baltic League Champion – 2005
- Lithuanian LKL Domestic Player of the Year – 2001
- Lithuanian LKL Most Improved Player – 2001
- Lithuanian LKL All-Star Game – 2002, 2005
