= Robertas Kuncaitis =

Lithuanian basketball coach (born 1964)

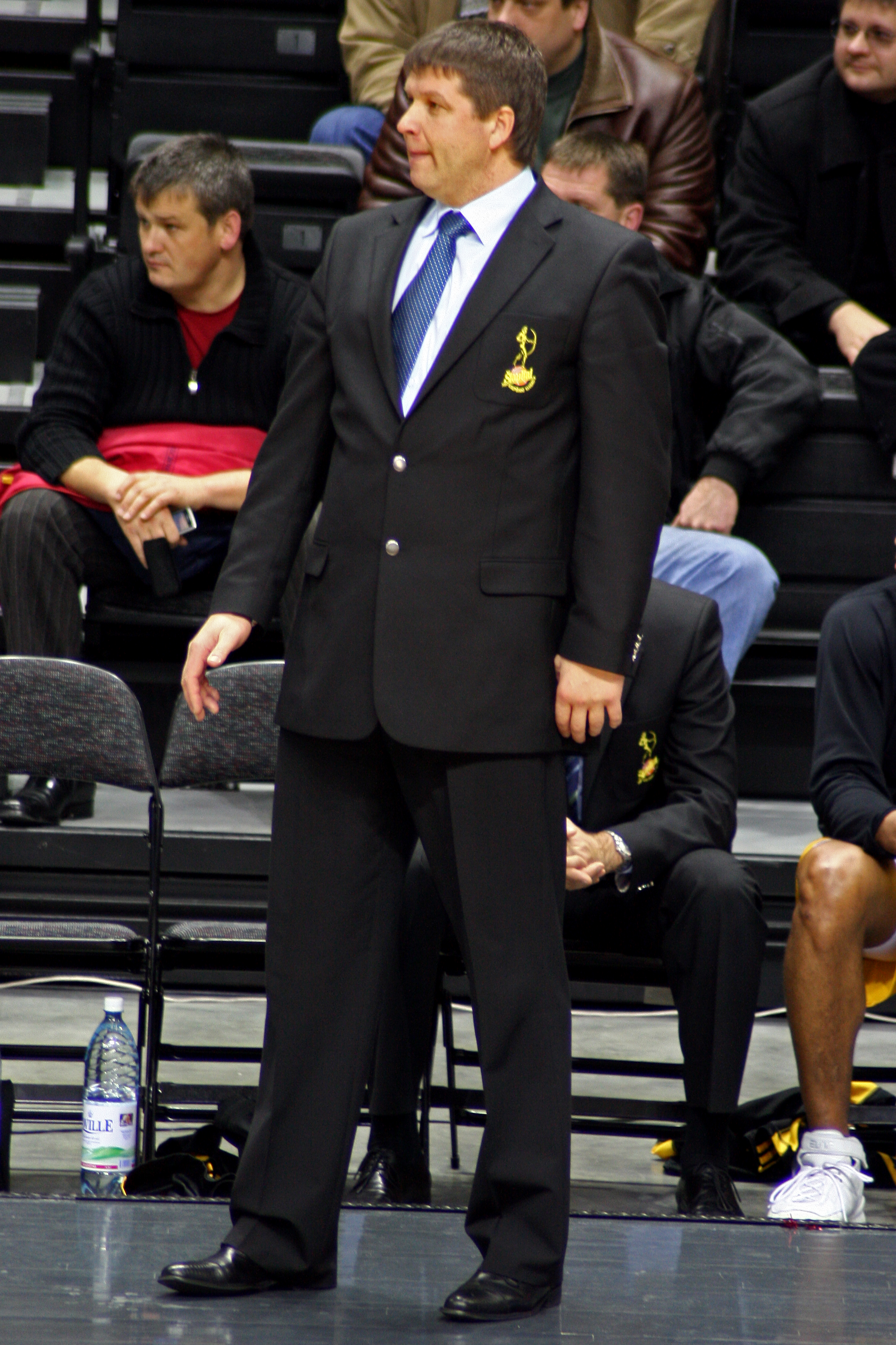
- Robertas Kuncaitis with BC Šiauliai

BC Khimki
- Position: Assistant coach
- League: VTB; EuroLeague

Personal information
- Born: 9 January 1964 (age 62) Šilutė, Lithuania
- Coaching career: 2002–present

Career history

Coaching
- 2002–2004: BC Šilutė (assistant)
- 2004: Lietuvos rytas Vilnius (assistant)
- 2004–2005: Neptūnas Klaipėda
- 2005–2006: Lietuvos rytas Vilnius (assistant)
- 2006–2007: Neptūnas Klaipėda
- 2007–2008: BC Šiauliai
- 2008–2010: Lietuvos rytas Vilnius (assistant)
- 2010–2011: Neptūnas Klaipėda
- 2007–2012: Lithuania (assistant)
- 2013–2015: ČEZ Nymburk (assistant)
- 2016–2017: BC Šilutė
- 2017–2018: Lietuvos rytas Vilnius (assistant)
- 2018–2019: Lietkabelis Panevėžys (assistant)
- 2019–present: BC Khimki (assistant)

Career highlights
- As head coach: As assistant coach: Lithuanian LKL champion (2006, 2009); EuroCup champion (2009); BBL champion (2006, 2009)

Robertas Kuncaitis (born January 9, 1964, in Šilutė, Lithuania) is a Lithuanian basketball coach who is currently an assistant coach for BC Khimki. He was a head coach of Neptūnas and assistant coach of the Lithuania national basketball team in the 2010–2011 season. On 6 May 2011, Neptūnas terminated the contract with Robertas Kuncaitis because of poor results.

== Career ==
- 2002–2004: BC Šilutė head coach
- 2004: BC Lietuvos Rytas assistant coach
- 2004–2005: KK Neptūnas head coach
- 2005–2006: BC Lietuvos Rytas assistant coach
- 2006–2007: KK Neptūnas head coach
- 2007–2008: BC Šiauliai head coach
- 2008–2010: BC Lietuvos Rytas assistant coach
- 2010–2011: KK Neptūnas head coach
- 2007–2012: Lithuania national basketball team assistant coach
- 2013–2015: ČEZ Basketball Nymburk assistant coach
- 2016-2017: BC Šilutė head coach
- 2017-2018: BC Lietuvos Rytas assistant coach
- 2018-2019: Lietkabelis Panevėžys assistant coach
- 2019-present: BC Khimki assistant coach

== Wins ==
- LKAL champion – 2003
- LKL vice-champion – 2004
- LKL champion – 2006
- BBL champion – 2006
- Bronze in EuroBasket 2007
- ULEB Eurocup champion 2009
