= Paulius Juodis =

Lithuanian basketball coach (born 1978)

Shanxi Loongs
- Position: assistant coach
- League: CBA

Personal information
- Born: August 24, 1978 (age 48) Utena, Lithuania SSR
- Coaching career: 2005–present

Career history

Coaching
- 2005–2007: Lietkabelis Panevėžys (assistant)
- 2007–2009: Neptūnas Klaipėda (assistant)
- 2009–2010: Neptūnas Klaipėda
- 2010–2011: Neptūnas Klaipėda (assistant)
- 2011–2012: Neptūnas Klaipėda
- 2012–2014: BC Budivelnyk (assistant)
- 2015–2016: Ohud Medina
- 2016–2017: BC Nevėžis
- 2017–2018: BC Nevėžis (assistant)
- 2018–2019: Guangdong Southern Tigers
- 2021: Wilki Morskie Szczecin (assistant)
- 2021–2023: BC Gargždai
- 2023–2025: Fujian Sturgeons (assistant)
- 2025: BC Jonava
- 2025–2026: Juventus Utena (assistant)
- 2026–present: Shanxi Loongs (assistant)

Career highlights
- As a coach: 2× Ukrainian Basketball SuperLeague champion (2013,2014); Ukrainian Basketball Cup winner (2014); Chinese Basketball Association champion (2019); NKL champion (2022)

Paulius Juodis (born August 24, 1978 in Utena, Lithuanian SSR, USSR) is a Lithuanian basketball coach. He is the current assistant coach for Shanxi Loongs of the CBA.

== Career ==
Juodis joined Lietkabelis Panevėžys in January 2005 as assistant coach, in November he was appointed as head coach. The next season he returned to the role of assistant coach.

In 2007 he signed with Neptūnas Klaipėda where he coached until 2012. Juodis held the assistant coach position in the 2007–2008, 2008–2009, 2010–2011 seasons and the head coach position in the 2009–2010, 2011–2012 seasons.

Juodis left the LKL for the first time in 2012 when he became the assistant coach of BC Budivelnyk in the Ukrainian Basketball SuperLeague, where he stayed until the end of the 2013–2014 season. Both seasons he coached there, BC Budivelyk were champions of the Ukrainian Basketball SuperLeague.

In October, 2014, it was announced that Juodis would be the new sports director of Rapla KK.

For the 2015–2016 season Juodis signed with Ohud Medina of the Saudi Basketball League.

Juodis came back to the LKL in 2016 when he signed with BC Nevėžis and became their head coach. In July, 2017, it was announced that for the upcoming season Juodis would be the assistant coach for the club.

He spent a season in the coaching staff of Guangdong Southern Tigers, which competes in the Chinese Basketball Association. The club won the league for the 9th time that season.

In July 2021, Juodis signed with Wilki Morskie Szczecin of the Polska Liga Koszykówki.

Juodis became the head coach of BC Gargždai midway through the 2021–2022 season and led the team to their first NKL title. Gargždai got promoted to the LKL for the next season. Juodis parted ways with the club midway through the 2022–23 season.

In his next coaching job he came back to the Chinese Basketball Association, this time becoming the assistant coach of Fujian Sturgeons in October 2023. Juodis was with the Fujian Sturgeons for 2 seasons.

On July 29, 2025, Juodis signed with BC Jonava of the LKL. On October 7, 2025, Juodis was fired after a bad start to the new season.

On December 28, 2025, Juodis was appointed as an assistant coach for Juventus Utena of the Lithuanian Basketball League (LKL).

On 21 September 2026, Juodis was named as the assistant coach for Shanxi Loongs of the CBA.
