= Arnas Beručka =

Lithuanian basketball player

No. 21 – Neptūnas Klaipėda
- Position: Shooting guard
- League: LKL; EuroCup

Personal information
- Born: 17 March 1997 (age 29) Vilnius, Lithuania
- Listed height: 1.95 m (6 ft 5 in)
- Listed weight: 86 kg (190 lb)

Career information
- Playing career: 2015–present

Career history
- 2015–2018: Lietuvos rytas Vilnius
- 2015-2018: →Perlas Vilnius
- 2017: →Vytautas Prienai–Birštonas
- 2018-2020: Juventus Utena
- 2018-2019: →BC Ežerūnas
- 2020–2021: BK Inter Bratislava
- 2021–2022: Pieno žvaigždės Pasvalys
- 2022–2024: BC Wolves
- 2024–present: Neptūnas Klaipėda

Arnas Beručka (born 17 March 1997) is a Lithuanian basketball player for Neptūnas Klaipėda of the Lithuanian Basketball League (LKL) and the EuroCup.

== Professional career ==
Beručka started his professional career signing with BC Perlas in 2015. He played 2 seasons in Perlas. In the second season, he was one of team leaders, averaging 11 points per game.

On 20 April 2017, Vytautas Prienai-Birštonas registered him because half of the team was injured and the pool of replacement candidates was small (LKL rules mandate a maximum age of signed players of 21 years).

On July 26, 2022, he has signed with BC Wolves of the Lithuanian Basketball League.

On June 19, 2024, he has signed with Neptūnas Klaipėda of the Lithuanian Basketball League.

== International career ==
Beručka represented Lithuanian youth national teams multiple times during the 2013 FIBA Europe Under-16 Championship, the 2015 FIBA Europe Under-18 Championship and the 2017 FIBA Europe Under-20 Championship.

== Career statistics ==
Legend
GP	Games played	GS	Games started	MPG	Minutes per game
FG%	Field-goal percentage	3P%	3-point field-goal percentage	FT%	Free-throw percentage
RPG	Rebounds per game	APG	Assists per game	SPG	Steals per game
BPG	Blocks per game	PPG	Points per game	PIR	Performance index rating
**Bold**	Career high

=== EuroCup ===
Year	Team	GP	GS	MPG	FG%	3P%	FT%	RPG	APG	SPG	BPG	PPG	PIR
2023–24	Wolves	**18**	8	17.5	.299	.214	.455	2.0	**1.1**	.4	.1	3.8	1.6
2025–26	Neptūnas Klaipėda	**18**	**10**	**19.6**	**.388**	**.340**	**.731**	**2.2**	.8	**1.1**	**.2**	**5.7**	**4.9**
Career		36	18	18.6	.343	.274	.649	2.1	.9	.8	.1	4.8	3.2
