= Donatas Zavackas =

Lithuanian professional basketball player and basketball executive

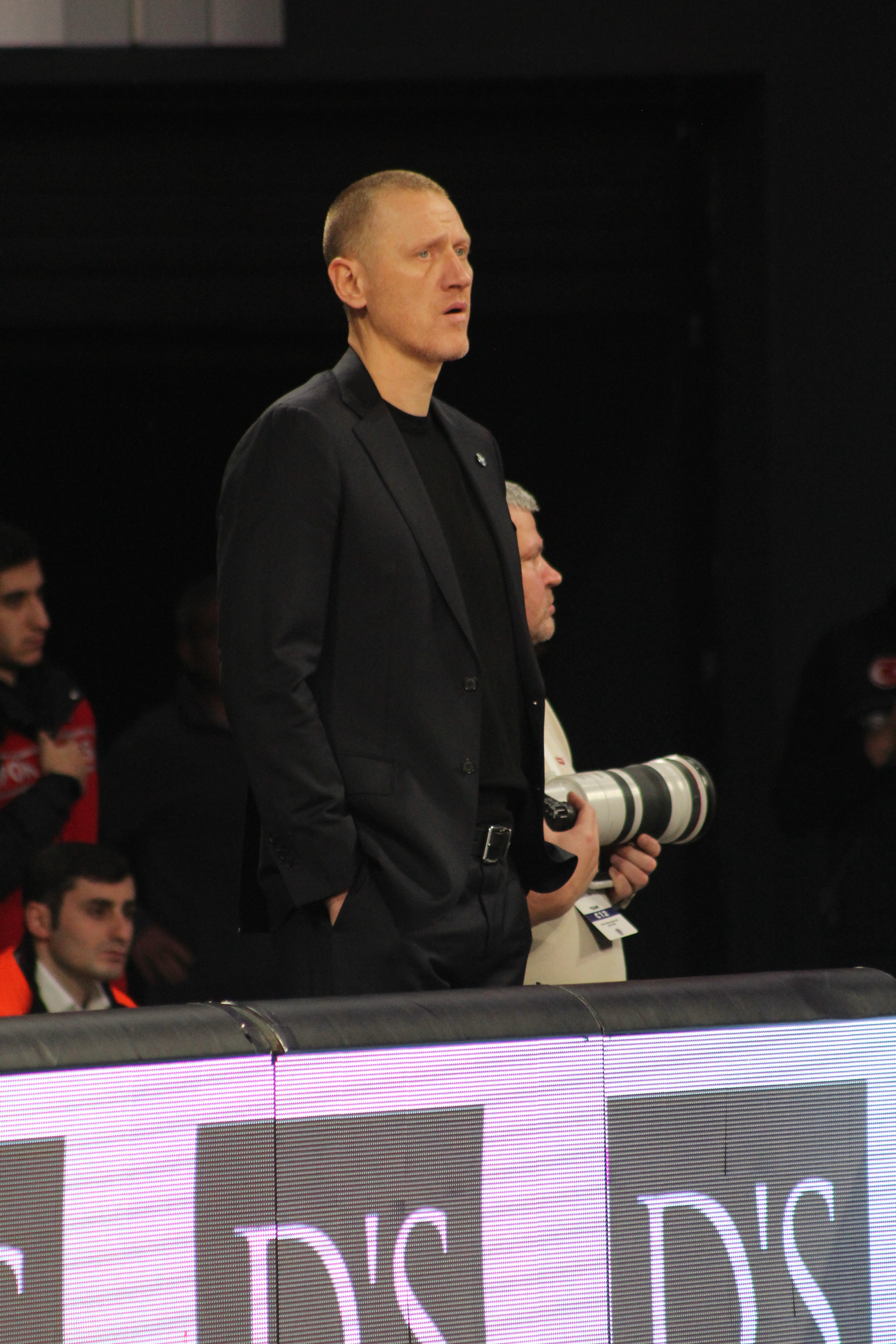
- Zavackas in 2024

Personal information
- Born: 23 April 1980 (age 46) Klaipėda, Lithuanian SSR, Soviet Union
- Listed height: 6 ft 8 in (2.03 m)
- Listed weight: 240 lb (109 kg)

Career information
- High school: St. Vincent – St. Mary (Akron, Ohio)
- College: Pittsburgh (1999–2003)
- NBA draft: 2003: undrafted
- Playing career: 1996–2017
- Position: Power forward
- Number: 14, 41

Career history
- 1996–1998: Neptūnas Klaipėda
- 2003–2004: Anwil Włocławek
- 2004–2005: Besançon BCD
- 2005: Liège Basket
- 2005–2006: Anwil Włocławek
- 2006: Snaidero Udine
- 2006: Neptūnas Klaipėda
- 2006–2007: BC Dnipro
- 2007–2008: Šiauliai
- 2008–2010: Lietuvos Rytas
- 2010–2012: EnBW Ludwigsburg
- 2012–2013: VEF Rīga
- 2013: Telekom Baskets Bonn
- 2014: Vanoli Cremona
- 2014–2016: Neptūnas Klaipėda
- 2016–2017: Consultinvest Pesaro

Career highlights
- EuroCup champion (2009); 2× Lithuanian LKL champion (2009, 2010); 2× Lithuanian LKF Cup winner (2009, 2010); Baltic League champion (2009); 2× Latvian LBL champion (2012, 2013); Latvian LBL All-Star (2013); Lithuanian LKL All-Star (2008); Lithuanian LKL MVP (2008); German BBL All-Star Game Three-Point Shoot Out champion (2012)

Donatas Zavackas (born 23 April 1980) is a Lithuanian professional basketball executive and former player, who was the sports director for Wolves Twinsbet of the Lithuanian Basketball League (LKL) and the EuroCup. He played college basketball at University of Pittsburgh. Standing at 6 ft 8 in (2.03 m), he played the power forward position.

== College career ==
During his successful career at Pitt, Zavackas was known as one of the most intelligent, hardworking team players in the Big East Conference. Zavackas was a key component in Head Coach Ben Howland's transformation of the Panthers into a level of league elite status. The season before Zavackas arrived, Pitt finished the Big East season in 11th place with a 5–13 record (14–16 overall). During Zavackas' four years the Panthers captured two regular season Big East Titles, played in three Big East tournament (BET) Championship games and captured one BET Championship. Pitt also played in one National Invitation Tournament and two NCAA Tournaments (advancing to the Sweet 16 round both times) with Zavackas at power forward position.

Zavackas scored 1,099 points for the Panthers which currently places him 31st on Pitt's All Time scoring list. His .807 free throw percentage is good enough for 5th place in Panther history.

Unfortunately, many Pittsburgh fans only remember Zavackas for removing his shoes and refusing to play in the waning minutes of an NCAA Tournament game. That game, versus Marquette, would be his last career college game.

== Professional career ==
After winning third place in the Lithuanian League (LKL) with Šiauliai, he moved to Lietuvos Rytas, where he became the LKL champion in 2009. In this club he gained reputation of overly emotional player.

In August 2010, he signed a one-year contract with the German club EnBW Ludwigsburg. In June 2011, he extended his contract with Ludwigsburg for one more season. In February, 2012 he moved to BK VEF Rīga, signing a two-year contract with a team.

On September 2, 2013, he signed a one-month contract with the EuroLeague powerhouse CSKA Moscow, to work with the team during preseason period. Later that month he moved to the German team Telekom Baskets Bonn. On December 30, 2013, he signed with the Italian team Vanoli Cremona for the remainder of the season.

In August 2014, he signed a two-year deal with his former team Neptūnas Klaipėda.

On August 16, 2016, Zavackas signed with Consultinvest Pesaro of the Italian Serie A. On October 9, 2017, Zavackas retired and became the sports director of Neptūnas Klaipėda.

== EuroLeague career statistics ==
Legend
GP	Games played	GS	Games started	MPG	Minutes per game
FG%	Field-goal percentage	3P%	3-point field-goal percentage	FT%	Free-throw percentage
RPG	Rebounds per game	APG	Assists per game	SPG	Steals per game
BPG	Blocks per game	PPG	Points per game	PIR	Performance index rating
**Bold**	Career high

Year	Team	GP	GS	MPG	FG%	3P%	FT%	RPG	APG	SPG	BPG	PPG	PIR
2009–10	Lietuvos Rytas	**10**	**9**	24.9	.379	.400	**.826**	3.1	1.1	**.9**	**.2**	7.9	6.7
2014–15	Neptūnas	**10**	**9**	**25.9**	**.594**	**.571**	.750	**5.1**	**1.8**	.7	.0	**12.0**	**13.7**
Career		20	18	25.4	.496	.480	.788	4.1	1.5	.8	.1	10.0	10.2
