= BC Neptūnas =

Basketball team in Klaipėda, Lithuania

Neptūnas Klaipėda
- Leagues: LKL; EuroCup
- Founded: 1964; 62 years ago
- History: Maistas Klaipėda (1962–1964); Neptūnas Klaipėda (1964–present)
- Arena: Švyturio Arena
- Capacity: 6,200
- Location: Klaipėda, Lithuania
- Team colors: Blue and white
- General manager: Martynas Mažeika
- Team manager: Dainius Vaitelis
- Head coach: Gediminas Petrauskas
- Team captain: Mindaugas Girdžiūnas
- Affiliations: Neptūnas-Akvaservis, VKKM, BC Neptūnas (Women), FK Neptūnas
- Championships: 1 Lithuanian SSR Championship
- Retired numbers: 3 (5, 7, 9)
- Website: bcneptunas.lt
Home	Away

Basketball Club Neptūnas (Lithuanian: Krepšinio klubas Neptūnas), commonly known as Neptūnas, Neptūnas Klaipėda and BC Neptūnas, is a Lithuanian professional basketball club based in Klaipėda, Lithuania. The club participates in the Lithuanian Basketball League and in the EuroCup. It was founded in 1962 under the name BC Maistas (English: food) and in 1964, BC Maistas's name was changed to BC Neptūnas. The club carries the name of the Roman sea god Neptune. Neptūnas participated in the 2014–15 EuroLeague season and is only the third Lithuanian club to participate in the premier European basketball league, after Žalgiris and Rytas.

== History ==
=== First steps (1962–1993) ===
In 1966 Neptūnas won the Žalgiris friendship championship and next year with the same roster became runners-up.

Since 1970 there have been many changes in the team: coaches and players left the team and were replaced with new team members, so the team did not achieve better results. In 1975 Klaipėda's community decided to change the team from its foundations based on people from Klaipėda and the Samogitia region, who also finished studies in the cities of Vilnius and Kaunas. There were young and prospective players, whose energy helped to reach better results in a period of two years, including 3rd place in Lithuanian Spartakiada; in 1981 and 1982 they became runners-up of newspaper Sport's championship, and also in 1983 they became champions of the Soviet Union Professional Union championship.

=== Difficult start in the LKL (1993–1998) ===
The Lithuanian Basketball Association was founded in 1993, when eight of the strongest Lithuanian basketball clubs' officials met with the representatives of the Šarūnas Marčiulionis basketball fund. Neptūnas was among that eight. This association would soon announce their basketball league that would start in the upcoming fall.

During the founding 1993–1994 LKL season, Neptūnas finished last, reaching only 4 victories per 36 games, despite the tireless efforts shown by Gintautas Bendžius, who averaged almost 20 points per game and was the third best scorer in the whole league. In the following season Neptūnas slightly improved, reaching 10 victories and suffering 30 defeats, with the help of a 21-year-old native Eurelijus Žukauskas, who quickly started becoming the star of the team and later was even nicknamed the "Lithuanian king of blocks".

In the 1995–1996 LKL season, Neptūnas progressed even further. With Svajūnas Airošius, Aloyzas Vasiliūnas, and Artūras Jakubauskas averaging double-digits in points and Eurelijus Žukauskas often adding solid double-doubles, the team qualified into the LKL playoffs for the first time with 17 victories as the 7th seed. But they were eliminated by the Lithuanian powerhouse Žalgiris Kaunas 0–2, after failing to guard the Lithuanian star and Olympic champion Rimas Kurtinaitis, who averaged 25.5 points over these games.

Neptūnas continued to show progress in the 1996–1997 season, qualifying for the LKL playoffs again by accomplishing a solid 19–17 record, the first with over 50% victories ratio in the club's LKL history. Despite losing the first series game versus BC Šiauliai 80–69, on April 4, 1997, Neptūnas achieved their first-ever victory in the LKL playoffs in a dominating fashion 88–60. Yet after Šiauliai's 88–73 revenge two days later, the series was lost 1–2. It was the last game for Eurelijus Žukauskas in a Neptūnas jersey, who, after averaging 15.7 points, 9.8 rebounds and 3.1 blocks, joined Žalgiris and soon became a EuroLeague champion and a multiple medalist with the Lithuania men's national basketball team. Another Neptūnas leader Artūras Jakubauskas left the team as well.

Following the loss of two long-term leaders, the team failed to compete with the same form during the 1997–1998 LKL season. Neptūnas finished as the 8th seed during the regular season with a 6–12 record, but after an unsuccessful second round they finished just 9th among 10 teams. The only consolation of the season was notable progress demonstrated by an 18-year-old Arvydas Macijauskas, who would later become one of the primary faces of Lithuanian basketball.

=== Participation in the Korać Cup (1998–2000) ===
The 1998–1999 season was remarkably different as on October 6, 1998, Neptūnas debuted in the FIBA Korać Cup, their first European tournament during a game versus the Espoon Honka, which they lost 93–73. But afterwards the team, led by Svajūnas Airošius, Arūnas Seferis and Arvydas Macijauskas, finished with a 4–2 record, claimed the second place in the group and advanced into the sixteenth-finals. They were stopped at that stage by Darüşşafaka, losing the series 0–2. Neptūnas also returned to the LKL playoffs that season after finishing 5th during the regular season. They were eliminated by BC Šiauliai yet again, this time 1–2. After the season, Arvydas Macijauskas signed with the Lietuvos rytas Vilnius.

During the 1999–2000 FIBA Korać Cup season, Neptūnas had less fortune than in the previous year. They were drawn into the group H, finished with just a 1–5 record, and after taking the 3rd spot in the group did not advance further. In the LKL, Neptūnas finished 8th and failed to challenge Žalgiris Kaunas in the first round of LKL playoffs, losing the series 0–2 with an average of 30 points difference.

=== First sparks in the LKL playoffs (2000–2012) ===
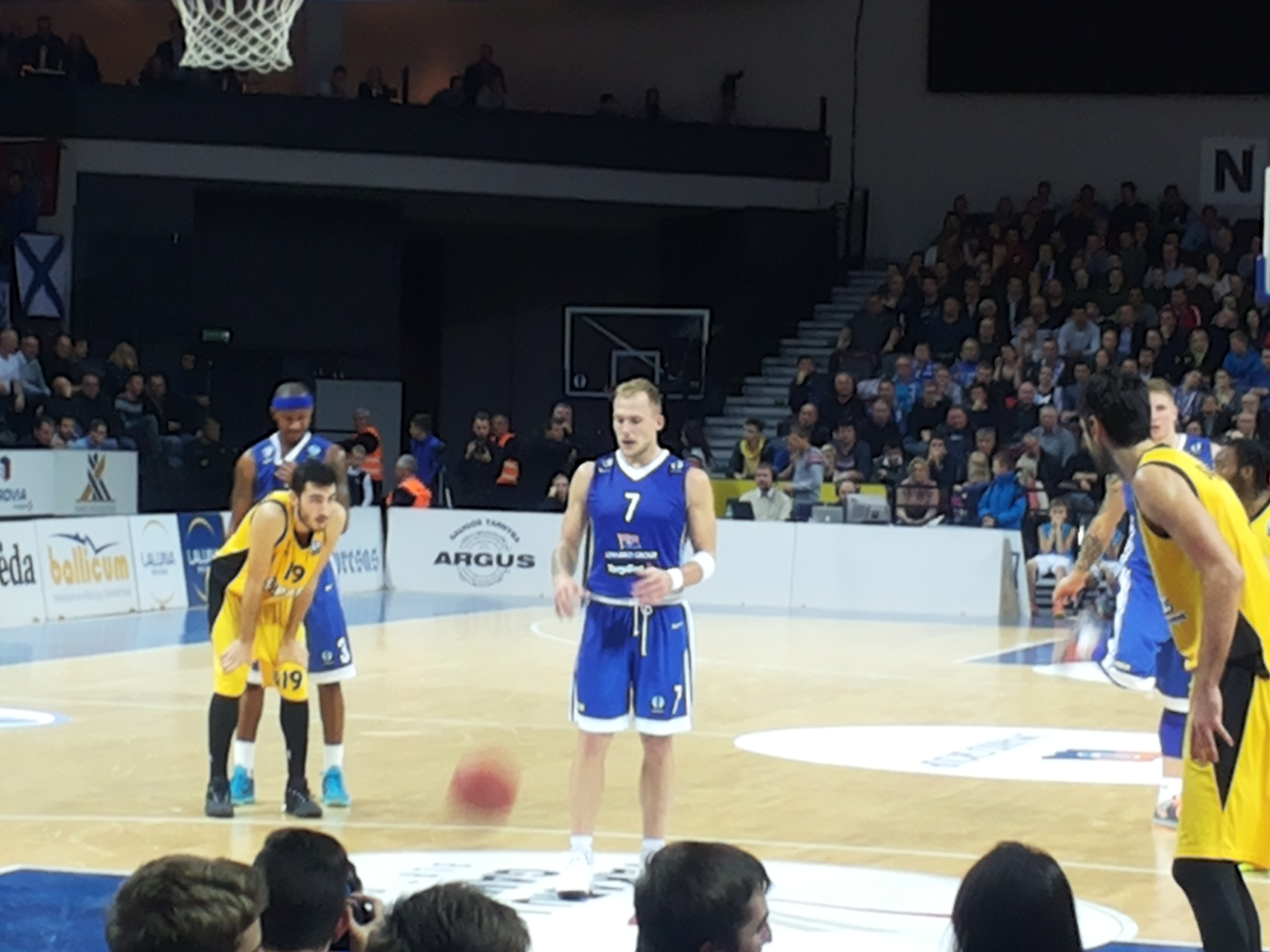
Future team's captain Martynas Mažeika debuted with a Neptūnas jersey in 2000.

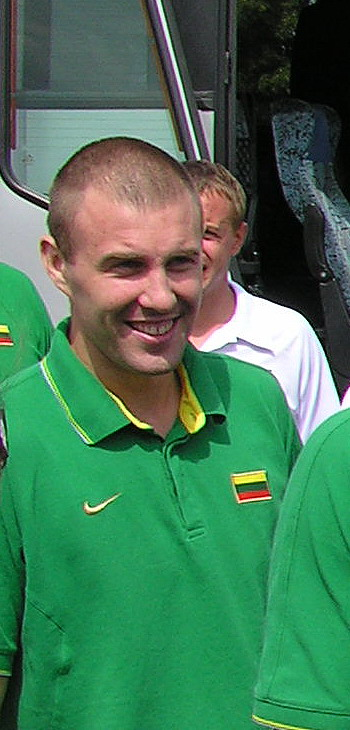
Tomas Delininkaitis, a two-time medalist with the Lithuania national team, started his career in Neptūnas.

After the 1999–2000 season, Neptūnas became a constant LKL playoffs participant, though at first they were unable to overcome the quarter-finals barrier. During the 2000–2001 LKL season, Neptūnas, led by one of the LKL's best scorer and playmaker Vidas Ginevičius (19.59 points, 4.32 assists per game), finished in a desired 3rd seed during the regular season, but was shockingly eliminated 0–2 by the Alita Alytus in the quarter-final. During the following 2001–2002 LKL season, Neptūnas triumphed just 10 times per 32 games, but that was enough to qualify for the LKL playoffs as the 8th seed, although they were quickly wiped out 0–2 by an uprising Lithuanian powerhouse Lietuvos rytas Vilnius, led by young and hungry Ramūnas Šiškauskas, Robertas Javtokas, Simas Jasaitis, Rimantas Kaukėnas and a former Neptūnas player Arvydas Macijauskas. The 2002–2003 LKL season was only slightly different; this time the Neptūnas squad finished 6th in the regular season, but yet again was smashed 0–2 in the quarter-final by BC Šiauliai, in spite of all of Tomas Delininkaitis's efforts. In the 2003–2004 season, Neptūnas reached the all-time bottom by winning just 6 times per 36 games and finishing last in the league (10th), including an absolutely disastrous 22 game losing streak.

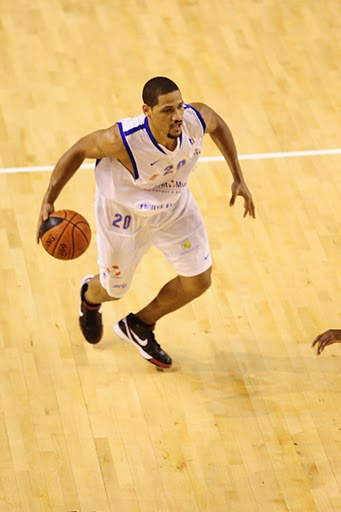
Antonio Grant, leader of the team during the 2004–2005 season

The 2004–2005 season was a bit more positive page in the club's history. During it, Neptūnas finished 4th during the regular LKL season and advanced to the TOP 5 teams of the league group, however Neptūnas was once again eliminated by BC Šiauliai in the knockout stage 1–2 and finished 5th in the final rankings. During the 2005 LKL All-Star Day, Petras Šalvis won the club's third LKL Three-point Shootout title. The team also participated in the Baltic Basketball League Elite Division for the first time as well, finishing 5th. Neptūnas slightly regressed again in the following 2005–2006 season, finishing 6th during the regular LKL season and, as previously, lost the first round of the LKL playoffs to BC Šiauliai 0–2 and finished only 10th in the BBL, with the only consolations being the club's fourth LKL Three-point Shootout title captured by Marius Kasiulevičius and the club's first-ever LKL Slam Dunk Contest champion title by Antonio Grant.

In the 2006–2007 season, Neptūnas finished 3rd during the regular LKL season for the second time in the club's history. Furthermore, they also finally sailed through the quarter-final stage of the LKL playoffs by overcoming the Nevėžis Kėdainiai 2–0. But Neptūnas' journey was again stopped by Lietuvos rytas at semi-finals 0–2, and Neptūnas qualified for their first historical LKL bronze final. The aspiration for the first-ever LKL medal was crushed by gallingly losing the series 0–3 to BC Šiauliai, with two home games being lost by just three and two points. In BBL, the team finished 2 places lower than in the previous season (12th).

Before the 2007–2008 season, Neptūnas signed with 19-year-old Deividas Gailius, who would soon lead Neptūnas during some of the club's most historic moments. However that season the team did not have much luck on the court. They ended up 5th during the regular LKL season and were once more eliminated in the quarter-final, this time by BC Alytus 1–2. The first series game, which could have made the series completely opposite, was dramatically lost by just three points in Alytus. Moreover, Neptūnas disappointingly finished only 16th in the BBL Elite Division. This was the club's worst and the last appearance in the elite division of the league.

The first part of the 2008–2009 LKL season finished almost identically when the club finished as the 5th seed, however the playoffs were drastically different. Neptūnas overcame the LKL quarter-final for the second time in history, beating Nevėžis 2–1. And after losing the semi-final to Žalgiris 0–2, Neptūnas returned to the bronze final for another try where they yet again faced a long-term rival BC Šiauliai. Despite the militant efforts and the thirst for a long-awaited revenge, the series was lost 2–3 following another dramatic defeat of 73–80 in Šiauliai, with Valdas Vasylius and Arvydas Eitutavičius scoring more than half of the team's points (45).

In the 2009–2010 LKL season, Neptūnas, led by a future team's manager Osvaldas Kurauskas, clinched the 5th spot during the regular season for a third straight year and was eliminated by the Juventus Utena 0–2 in the quarter-final. The 2010–2011 LKL regular season achieved just one less victory than the previous season, however this resulted in finishing only 8th and facing off the upcoming champions Žalgiris Kaunas in the first round of the playoffs. Regardless of being smashed 61–96 in Kaunas during the first series encounter, the team, led by a captain Martynas Mažeika, mightily fought in their home arena, this time losing only 82–88. Nevertheless, with the Švyturys Arena being built in the city, the historical victories and achievements were yet to come.

=== Historical victories and achievements (2012–2016) ===
==== 2012–13 season: VTB United League debut ====
"It is sweet. Especially because of the way we achieved it. We were a young, talented, ambitious, but inconsistent team. Prienai ruined our feast in Klaipėda, so now we ruined their feast in Prienai. Prienai kindled hell at home, but we haven't heard it. We were pumped for basketball and it did not affect us."

— Kazys Maksvytis, following the club's first triumph in the LKL bronze final.

2012 was a memorable year for Neptūnas as they were invited to VTB United League, despite the fact that they only took 6th place in LKL the previous season. Club director Osvaldas Kurauskas said that they are not going to be group outsiders and that they will raise the club's budget for the next season. Neptūnas debuted in VTB United League on October 7, 2012, against CSKA Moscow. Despite a powerful opponent Neptūnas won two quarters by one point (23–22, 14–13), however it was not enough to win the game as Neptūnas lost 72–83. After the season in the VTB United League, they were last in the group, however they were invited to continue playing in this league for another season. Despite poor results in the VTB League, where they finished with a dismal 3–15 record, Neptūnas recovered in the LKL, thanks to very solid play from leader Deividas Gailius, finishing 3rd and winning the bronze medals for the first time in club history, in a competitive series against BC Prienai, winning 3–2.

==== 2013–14 season: First time LKL finalists ====
"Now we are loading our suitcases and are going back to Klaipėda, but not quietly, we are going there with a cup and raised heads. I think the fans were satisfied with the final series. <...> I hope that Klaipėda's team will climb higher step by step. <...> I think we can play in the Euroleague."

— Kazys Maksvytis, after losing the club's first LKL final series 2–4.

The 2013–14 season was not less memorable for Neptūnas. During the regular season, Neptūnas defeated LKL champion and constant EuroLeague participant Žalgiris Kaunas several times, with the results 81–73 at Švyturys Arena and 79–88 at Žalgiris Arena. In the regular LKL season Neptūnas took third place and met Šiauliai in the quarter-finals, who they eliminated with a series result of 2–1. Neptūnas also won the semi-finals against Prienai TonyBet with a result of 2-0 and qualified to the LKL finals for the first time in club history. In the finals Neptūnas met previously defeated Žalgiris. Despite two former victories during the regular season, basketball experts were widely skeptical that Neptūnas could win any games there. Nevertheless, the militant Neptūnas showed that they can fight against Žalgiris and won their first LKL final series game with a 71–59 score in crammed Švyturys Arena, however then Neptūnas lost three games to Žalgiris and almost lost all the chances of winning the series. In spite of that, Neptūnas did not give up and won the fifth series game with a score of 87–86, however they failed to do that again in the sixth series game and after being crushed 90–70, lost the LKL final series with a result of 4–2. Despite a sufficiently successful LKL season, Neptūnas had tough times in international competitions. In the second-tier European league EuroCup Neptūnas won four games out of ten and after taking fifth place of sixth in the group did not qualify into the second stage. Neptūnas also participated in VTB United League, however there, after winning five of eighteen games, Neptūnas did not qualify into the playoffs and took eighth place out of ten in the group. Following the best LKL season in club history, on June 25, 2014, Neptūnas was invited to join the prestigious EuroLeague as an LKL vice-champion for the 2014–15 season.

==== 2014–15 season: EuroLeague debut ====
Since 2011 Neptūnas has played in one of Lithuania's finest arenas.

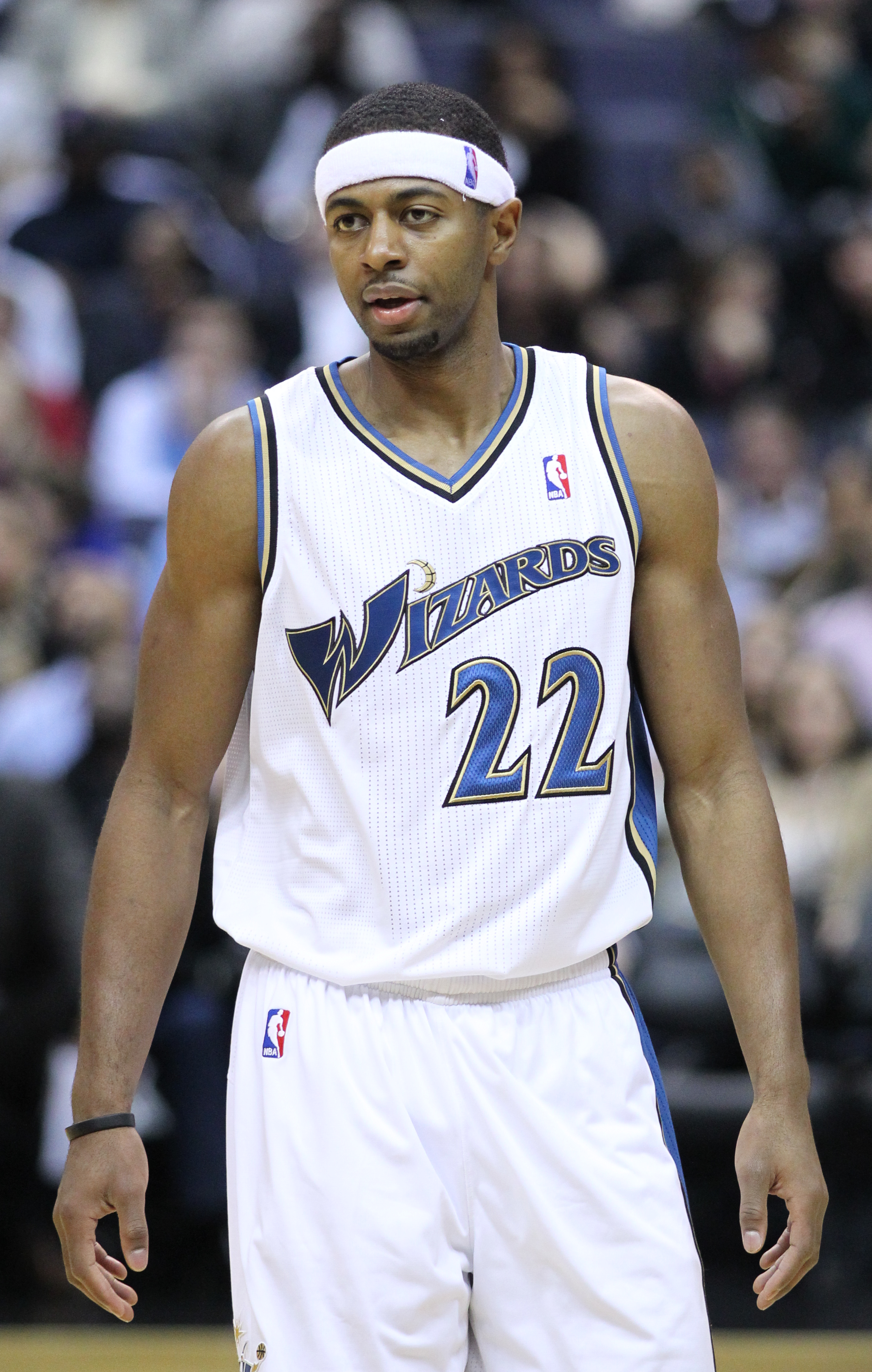
Mustafa Shakur, one of Neptūnas's leaders in the 2014–15 season

Before their debut in the EuroLeague, Neptūnas recalled former team leader Deividas Gailius. Multiple LKL champion Donatas Zavackas and UBL champion Michailas Anisimovas were signed as well. However, Anisimovas left the team shortly afterward without debuting in the EuroLeague due to the Russo-Ukrainian war. On October 15, 2014, Neptūnas played their first EuroLeague game against the Laboral Kutxa, which they lost 69–88 despite playing more than two quarters point-to-point. On October 23, 2014, Neptūnas achieved the club's first EuroLeague victory against KK Crvena zvezda with a score of 83–81 after the Valdas Vasylius winning shot 3 seconds away from over-time. This was the first EuroLeague game played in the Neptūnas home-court. On October 31, 2014, Neptūnas lost their third EuroLeague game only after OT 81–85 against one of the strongest tournament teams, Olympiacos Piraeus, two times EuroLeague champion over the past three years. Despite being competitive and cherishing a chance of qualifying for the TOP16 stage, Neptūnas failed to accomplish this in their debut EuroLeague season, winning 4 games of 10 total and taking 5th place in the group. It was just one step from the TOP16's qualifier Galatasaray, who also finished with a 4–10 record. As a result, Neptūnas was transferred to the EuroCup Last 32 stage. The EuroCup was just a terrible place for Neptūnas. There they won only once against Paris-Levallois Basket, suffered five defeats and took last place in the group. A promising season in international competitions was finished painfully.

On February 20–22, Neptūnas participated in the 2015 LKF Cup. They surprisingly lost the quarter-finals game to Šiauliai 71–73 and ended the appearance in competition early.

Neptūnas recovered in the LKL, playing very solidly, even splitting the season series with Žalgiris. They defeated the Lithuanian powerhouse twice in two weeks: 67–65 in Klaipėda and 90–86 in Kaunas. Deividas Gailius led Neptūnas during these two games. But they took only the third spot during the regular season due to the unfavorable results versus Lietuvos rytas. Neptūnas defeated Dzūkija with the series result of 3–1, losing only once in Alytus 56–65. The semi-finals began unsuccessfully for the team versus Lietuvos rytas. Despite holding up close to the opponents the whole game, Neptūnas lost during the final minutes 88–79 in Vilnius. But Neptūnas, led by Deividas Gailius (22 points) and Arnas Butkevičius (20 points), successfully got revenge in Klaipėda, overcoming Rytas 107–101 after OT. The semi-final series was tied at 1–1. But Neptūnas lost another thriller 96–89 two days later in Vilnius and ended up on the edge of the precipice. Furthermore, primary Neptūnas center Simas Galdikas suffered a painful leg injury, after stepping on Kšyštof Lavrinovič's feet. Despite that, the team's coach Kazys Maksvytis said that "we will meet in Vilnius again". This promise did not came true following the 87–92 loss at home. Neptūnas lost the semi-final series 3–1 to Lietuvos rytas. And then Neptūnas suffered the biggest fiasco of the season. They shockingly lost to Juventus in the LKL bronze medals series 2–3, including an embarrassing defeat in the decisive game 69–84 in the home arena.

Neptūnas had the highest attendance rate in all of LKL during this season (3,022 spectators per game).

==== 2015–16 season: Second EuroCup season ====
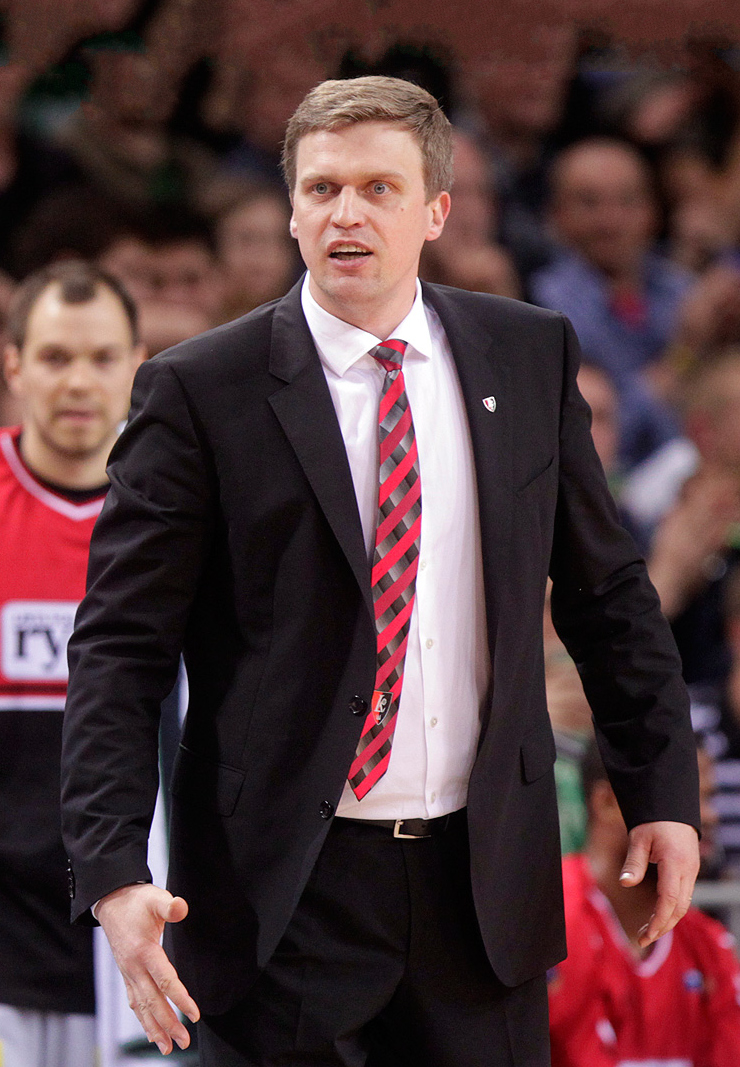
Dainius Adomaitis replaced Kazys Maksvytis in 2015.

Following the lost LKL semi-final and the bronze final last season, Neptūnas did not automatically qualify into the EuroCup. But on June 29, 2015, they received the wild card to the tournament. For the first time in history, three Lithuanian basketball clubs were invited to participate in the second-tier European league. Krasta Auto (authorized BMW dealer in Lithuania) became one of the club sponsors, giving brand-new cars for the club members.

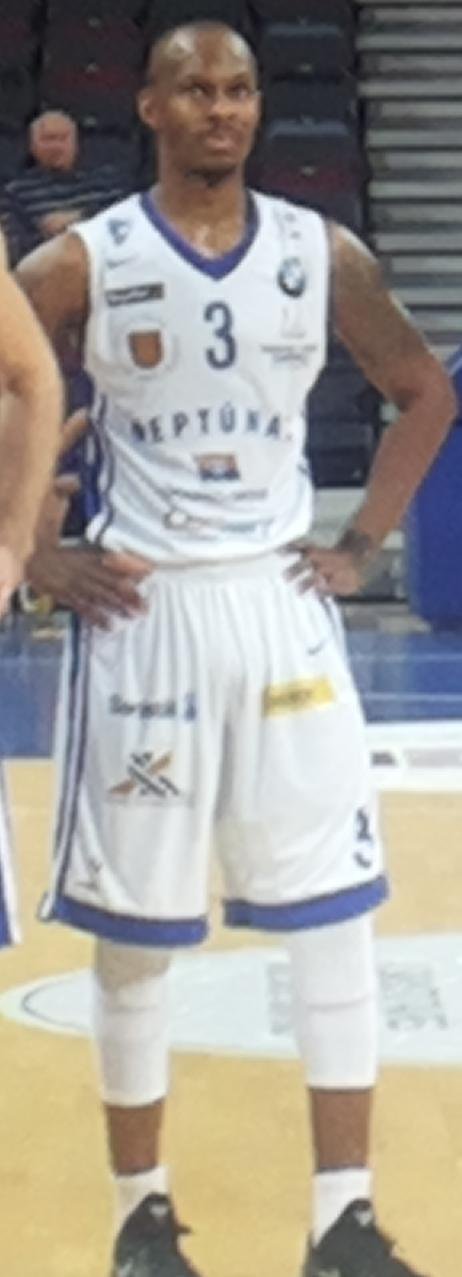
Daniel Ewing, star of the team during the 2015–16 season

Neptūnas began the summer by losing former leader Deividas Gailius, who signed with Lietuvos rytas Vilnius. Gailius was replaced with one of the last season Juventus leaders Arvydas Šikšnius. Furthermore, former Juventus head coach Dainius Adomaitis signed a two-year deal with Neptūnas as well. Past Lithuania men's national basketball team head coach Kęstutis Kemzūra, Olympic champion Valdemaras Chomičius, Lithuania national team head coach assistant Darius Maskoliūnas and Gediminas Petrauskas were other solid candidates to replace Kazys Maksvytis. Neptūnas captain Martynas Mažeika signed a new two-year contract with the club. It was his 11th season at Neptūnas. Vytautas Šarakauskas and Simas Galdikas stayed with Neptūnas as well, both signing two-year contracts with the club. One of BK Ventspils's leaders Jerai Grant became the club's first foreigner in the summer of 2015. University of Rhode Island graduate Gilvydas Biruta, who represented the Denver Nuggets during the 2015 NBA Summer League, also joined BC Neptūnas. Three times Polish league champion and experienced EuroLeague player Daniel Ewing became Neptūnas' main point guard on August 15, 2015. Neptūnas also signed multiple NCAA three-pointers record holder Travis Bader to strengthen the shooting guard position.

On October 14, 2015, the new 2015–16 EuroCup season began with a loss to the powerful Galatasaray S.K. squad 90–94 in Klaipėda. The second game versus the Hapoel Jerusalem was not successful either, losing it 74–59. But afterwards the team began showing a very solid form. They won 6 of 7 games, including the noteworthy away games victories versus the BC Nizhny Novgorod 78–82 and Galatasaray S.K. 76–82, both of them being EuroLeague Top 16 participants last season. During the last match of the regular season versus the AEK, Neptūnas was even able to guarantee the first place in the group, but after dissipating a 16-point advantage in the third quarter, lost it 75–71 and finished second. Just before the start of the EuroCup's Last 32 stage, Trent Plaisted replaced Simas Galdikas. Despite a very successful first stage, the Last 32 phase began with a desperate loss to Aris 84–58 in Thessaloniki. However, the team then created a feast in Klaipėda, defeating Alba Berlin 73–65. Following it, Neptūnas suffered two close defeats to the Italian powerhouse EA7 Emporio Armani Milan (79–71 in Milan and 73–74 in Klaipėda). The pleasant 72–68 rematch with Aris left the Neptūnas hopes for the playoffs alive, though it vanished after losing to Alba 62–76 in Berlin and finishing with a 2–4 record in the second round.

"It's been a very long journey but what we accomplished was great. Salute to ALL the fans and people of Klaipėda, thank you very much for your support and generosity! Special thanks to my teammates, none of this was possible without the commitment we had for each other. Thanks to the coaching staff and organization for the opportunity to wear the jersey of NEP-TŪ-NAS. And if our paths never cross again, I'd like to say it's been a pleasure."

— Daniel Ewing.

On 19–21 February, Neptūnas competed in the newly formed Karaliaus Mindaugo taurė tournament. The team easily overcame BC Šiauliai 96–58 at the quarter-final, but was powerfully stopped at the semi-final by the upcoming champions Lietuvos rytas Vilnius 97–79. Still, they rehabilitated by winning the club's first Lithuanian Cup bronze medals after crushing Vytautas Prienai-Birštonas 88–51. Shortly after the competition, Gilvydas Biruta was replaced with Angus Brandt.

In LKL, Neptūnas finished the regular season with a third seed and a 19–17 record. Švyturys Arena had the most spectators in the LKL for a second straight season, this time with 3,474 per game. In the quarter-final, Neptūnas eliminated BC Šiauliai 3–1. The semi-final series versus Lietuvos rytas Vilnius was one of the most dramatic in the league's history. Neptūnas began it by shocking Rytas in their home arena with an 83–71 victory. Afterwards, the team also secured their home court in Game 2, winning 70–68. The fate of the historic series was to be determined in Game 5, following two dramatic Rytas victories: 66–64 and 74–73. During Game 5, Daniel Ewing led Neptūnas to another stunning upset of the Lithuanian powerhouse 73–72, surprisingly won the intense series 3–2, and advanced into the LKL final just for a second time in club history. The final series was begun with an 83–72 loss to Žalgiris Kaunas. Just three days later, Neptūnas by surprise swept Žalgiris 76–54 to tie the series 1–1. In spite of that, later Neptūnas failed to compete in the series, losing the next three games by an average of 25 points and the series 1–4.

=== Basketball Champions League participants (2016–2020) ===
==== 2016–17 season: Basketball Champions League debut ====
On October 21, 2016, Neptūnas decided to choose the FIBA Basketball Champions League instead of the EuroCup. On July 10, Neptūnas re-signed with the efficient center Jerai Grant for another season. On July 27, Larry Drew II, son of the prominent NBA player and coach Larry Drew, joined the team to replace Daniel Ewing who left the team. On August 4, former Lithuania men's national basketball team member Tadas Klimavičius signed a two-seasons deal with the club. On August 10, Matas Jucikas signed a long-term (three-seasons) deal. On August 24, another Lithuanian, Mindaugas Kačinas, fresh out of the NCAA Division I US college basketball system at South Carolina, was signed. On August 26, Jimmy Baron became the last addition to the team's roster before the beginning of the season. On November 3, the front line was strengthened with Omari Johnson.

On October 19, Neptūnas started the 2016–17 Basketball Champions League season with a close 67–65 away victory over Uşak Sportif. Neptūnas ended up as the second team in the group, with a 10–4 record and a first round playoff bye.

In January, Tadas Klimavičius left after terminating his contract and signed with BC Vytautas. While the Klimavičius departure was not as significant, team star and leader Jimmy Baron signed with BC Lietuvos rytas in February, shocking both the team and its fans. On February 10, just one day after Baron's departure, the team released Drew and Johnson, after reported discipline violations. Club director and longtime former player Osvaldas Kurauskas was fired as well. The departures affected the team, who were easily defeated in the first round of the King Mindaugas Cup by BC Žalgiris 58–81. However, by the end of February, good news struck the team - Daniel Ewing returned to Neptūnas from Israel, replacing Larry Drew at the point guard position, and Neptūnas also signed Chris Lofton to a deal, to replace Jimmy Baron. The changes did not help the team in the Champions League, ending with a loss on aggregate to MHP Riesen Ludwigsburg in the quarterfinals 119–125 (61–73 away and 58–52 home).

While the season was over in the Champions League, Neptūnas went on a win streak in the LKL, climbing up the standings. They finished the regular season in fourth seed with 21 victories and 15 defeats balance. During the 2016–17 LKL Playoffs quarter-final Neptūnas eliminated Juventus Utena 3–0, and advanced into the semi-finals where they faced Lithuanian champions Žalgiris Kaunas. Game 1 of the series did not provide much intrigue in Kaunas, with Žalgiris desperately crushing Neptūnas 83–54. The view was completely different during Game 2 in Klaipėda where Neptūnas defeated Žalgiris 73–70 to even the series 1–1. In Kaunas, Žalgiris won again, 83–60 and finished the series in Klaipėda, where Neptūnas lost the game 53–69 and the series 1–3. During the LKL bronze final Neptūnas faced Lietuvos rytas Vilnius for the intense series. Both teams successfully defended their home courts with Neptūnas losing the opening game on May 29, 2017, in Vilnius 79–60, but winning 83–70 on June 1 in Klaipėda. Later the series continued in the same order with Lietuvos rytas defeating Neptūnas 71–54 for the second time in Vilnius on June 4, and Neptūnas doing the same 70–65 in Klaipėda on June 7 to force the Game 5 of the series. Neptūnas lost the series on June 10 in Vilnius after losing the crucial game 75–66 and the series 3–2, mostly because of two former Neptūnas players Jimmy Baron and Deividas Gailius who combined for more than a half of Rytas' points (39). A very promising season at the beginning ended on a very disappointing note.

==== 2017–18 season: Second Basketball Champions League season ====
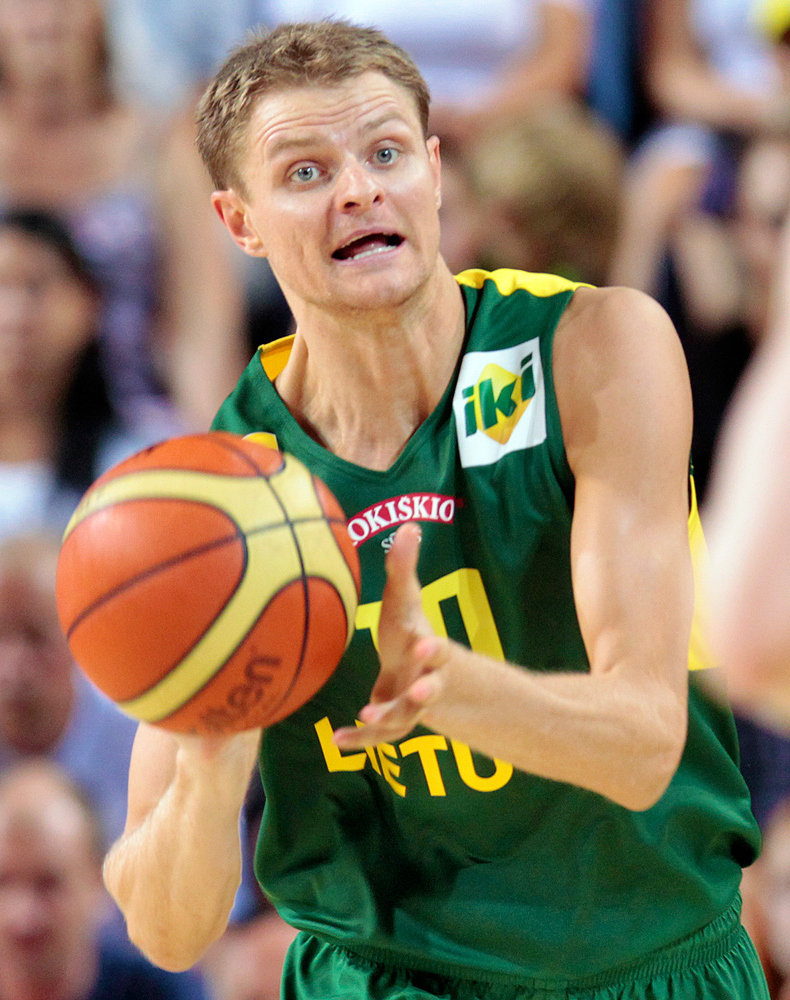
Renaldas Seibutis, one of the primary players in the 2017–18 season

On June 28, 2017, it was announced that Neptūnas will compete in the 2017–18 Basketball Champions League season without participating in the qualifying tournament. On the same day former head coach Kazys Maksvytis returned to the team, replacing the newly chosen Lithuania men's national basketball team head coach Dainius Adomaitis due to the difficulties to match two coaching positions. Edgaras Želionis became club's first player addition for the upcoming season on July 5, 2017. Afterwards, the team has signed two long-term Lithuania national team members Tomas Delininkaitis and Renaldas Seibutis. On July 27, 2017, Neptūnas reached an agreement with Laimonas Kisielius and signed a two-years deal. On August 10, 2017, the team signed Juan Palacios to replace Jerai Grant. On August 14, 2017, former team member Simas Galdikas returned to the team. Due to the departure of the previous long-term captain Martynas Mažeika, Simas Galdikas was chosen to replace him in the position.

On September 21, 2017, Neptūnas began the 2017–18 LKL season by defeating BC Šiauliai 73–82. On the next day, Malcolm Armstead, known for his scoring ability, was signed. After a solid 5–1 LKL season start, including a 73–64 victory versus the reigning champions Žalgiris Kaunas, on October 10, 2017, Neptūnas successfully started the 2017–18 Basketball Champions League season with a last seconds 75–73 victory over the French League champions Élan Chalon. On October 25, 2017, Malcolm Armstead was replaced with Jerry Johnson due to his poor sport form. On November 1, 2017, Neptūnas crushed Gaziantep Basketbol during the Champions League away game 114–73 and achieved their highest victory in the history of the tournament. More wins followed - a dominating away against Betaland Capo d'Orlando 90–60, and a home win against P.A.O.K. BC - 82–69. Neptūnas also picked up home wins over Lietuvos rytas Vilnius 81–76 and Lietkabelis Panevėžys 86–76, and moved up to 2nd place in the LKL standings. However, financial problems surfaced - Neptūnas was badly beaten in the Champions League by defending league champion Iberostar Tenerife 67–90, and lost team leaders Mindaugas Girdžiūnas and Arnas Butkevičius, who left the team to sign with Lietuvos rytas. On December 14, 2017, team manager Artūras Žalys was fired and was replaced by a prominent Lithuanian basketball agent Virginijus Bulotas. This proved to be false, as the man that wanted to hire Bulotas, Artūras Jakubauskas, was fired and was replaced by Giedrius Vasilkevičius. Sigitas Ambrazevičius became the new team owner. After some more bad news - Palacios leaving for Beşiktaş J.K., some good news arrived - Neptūnas signed Vytautas Šulskis and new point guard Brandon Fields, who replaced the departed Girdžiūnas. In the second round of the Champions League, Neptūnas struggled - they lost to Élan Chalon 81–86, but won the away game against Ventspils 84–69 (Neptūnas had won at home 87–80 in the first round). Neptūnas suffered their first loss of the season at home against MHP Riesen Ludwigsburg 71–87 (Neptūnas lost the first round away game 83–95). In an away game against Gaziantep, Neptūnas were down by double digits for most of the game - but managed to force overtime, and lost 94–98 after coach Maksvytis got ejected. After a dominating home win against Betaland Capo d'Orlando 99–62, Neptūnas lost the final two games of the regular season against P.A.O.K. 70–91 in Thessaloniki and against Iberostar at home, 67–83. Neptūnas finished the regular season with a 7–7 record, but made the playoffs. On February 13, Neptūnas suffered one of the most embarrassing losses of the season, losing to BC Dzūkija 77–85 in the quarterfinals of the King Mindaugas Cup. The loss was especially painful, because the final four of the tournament was held in Klaipėda. In the Champions League playoffs, Neptūnas suffered another heartbreak, losing the SIG Basket on aggregate 151–158, winning the first match at home 73–68, but losing a thriller at Strasbourg in overtime, 78–88. In the LKL, Neptūnas rebounded and defeated Lietuvos rytas 99–86 in Vilnius, thus showing signs of improved play. Neptūnas then signed center Jameel McKay, to help the team in the LKL. McKay, however, played poorly and was released in May.

Neptūnas finished 3rd in the regular season in the LKL, and defeated BC Pieno žvaigždės 3–1 in the quarterfinals, including a dominating 101–64 win in the deciding game four in Pasvalys. Neptūnas faced rival BC Lietuvos rytas in the semifinal. After winning the first game 84–79 in Vilnius and taking the series lead, Neptūnas had one of the worst shooting performances of all time, losing 49–67 in Klaipėda, with Rytas tying the series 1–1. Rytas then won the third game in Vilnius 74–67, and took a 2–1 lead in the series. Led by Želionis, Seibutis, Delininkaitis and Galdikas, Neptūnas tied the series with a 74–70 win in Klaipėda. In the decisive fifth game in Vilnius, Neptūnas lost a close game 82–88, and lost the series 2–3. In the series for 3rd place, Neptūnas faced previous year's finalist, BC Lietkabelis. Having home court advantage, Neptūnas started the series with an embarrassing 69–83 loss - Lietkabelis had led by 29 points at one point and only when young players like Matas Jucikas and Laurynas Beliauskas were in, did Neptūnas cut the deficit. Down 0–1 in the series, Neptūnas was down for much of the game in Panevėžys, including an 11-point deficit in the 2nd quarter, before coming from behind and winning the game 71–69, after a last second layup by Seibutis. The series was tied 1–1. In the third game at home, Neptūnas took the lead in the first quarter and never looked back, winning 79–71 and taking a 2–1 series lead. In the fourth game in Panevėžys, Neptūnas started slowly, but led by Želionis, who scored 27 points in the game, Delininkaitis and Johnson, took the lead by half-time, and went on to win the game 89–78, winning the series 3–1 and winning the bronze medals for the second time in club history. After all the turmoil all season long, the win helped the team finish the season on a high.

==== 2018–19 season: Third Basketball Champions League season ====
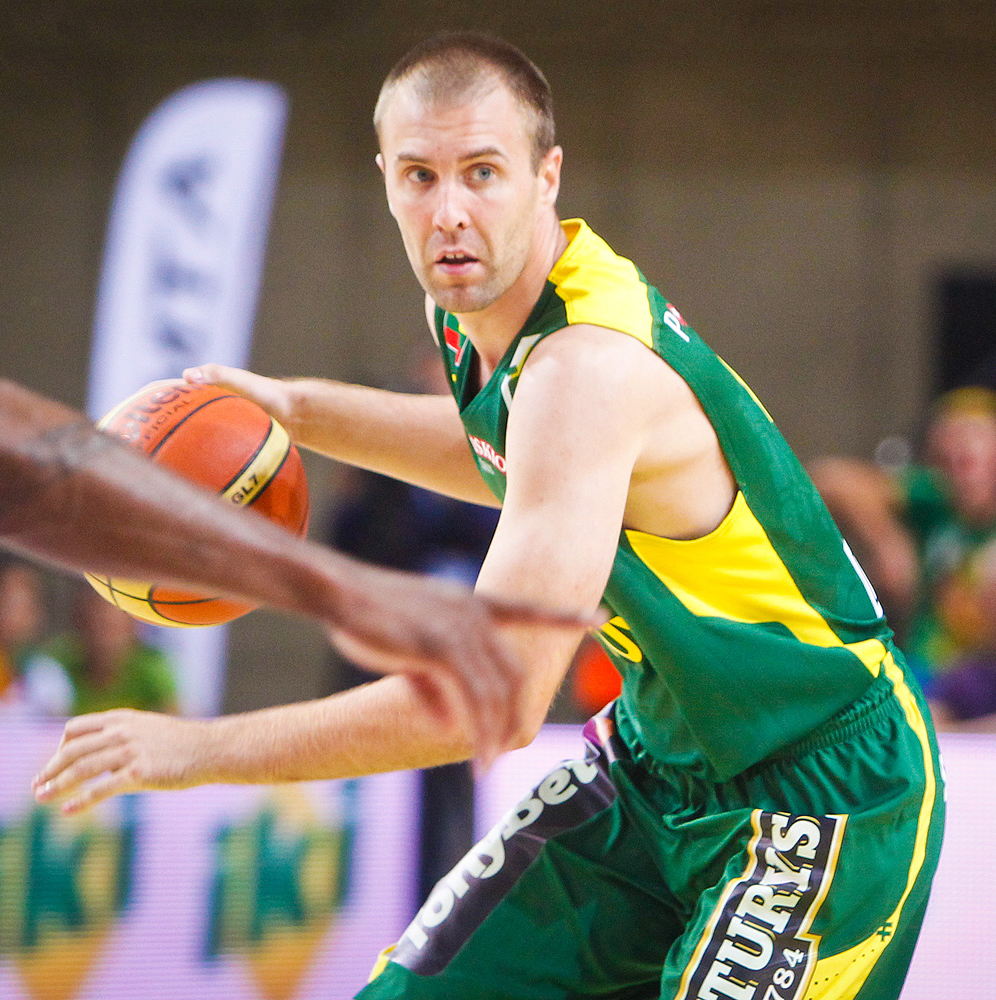
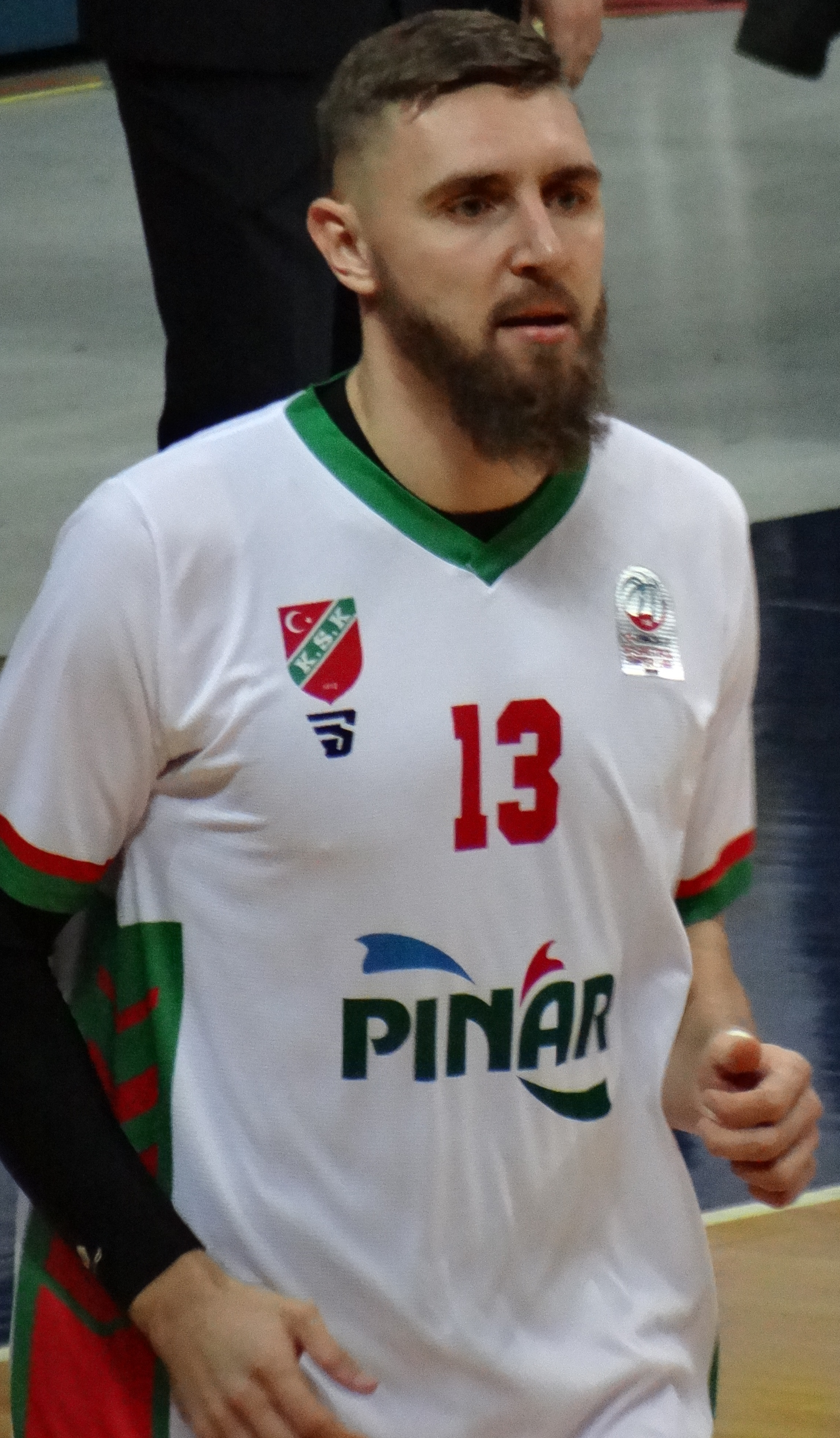
Tomas Delininkaitis (left) and Deividas Gailius (right), both natives of Klaipėda, were major stars of the team in the 2018–19 season.

After the season ended, Neptūnas entered the off-season with uncertainty. Team leaders Seibutis and Želionis departed, and players like Fields, Johnson, Šulskis and Kačinas were released. Coach Maksvytis remained with the team, and all the chaos with the management was sorted out. Neptūnas signed Paulius Dambrauskas and Lorenzo Williams from rival BC Lietkabelis, as the new point guards. Neptūnas then signed back Jerai Grant, who returned after a one-year absence, at center. Žalgiris loaned Neptūnas Gytis Masiulis, one of the team's top prospects, to get more playing time. Neptūnas also signed Osvaldas Olisevičius, the leader of BC Pieno žvaigždės, to a one-year deal. Kyle Weaver signed with Neptūnas in August. Neptūnas showed a lot of promise during the pre-season, winning a couple of tournaments. On January 14, 2019, Deividas Gailius returned to Neptūnas, signing for the rest of the season. On April 4, 2019, Weaver was released by Neptūnas.

Neptūnas started the 2018–19 LKL season with a 100–76 home win over BC Nevėžis. On October 14, Neptūnas shocked champions BC Žalgiris with a dominating 75–60 win in Kaunas, and climbed to first place in the LKL standings. On November 3, Neptūnas picked up another shocking away win, beating rivals BC Rytas in Vilnius, 78–66. The seven game win streak ended on November 18, in a home defeat against BC Rytas, 78–93, also losing the 1st place in the standings to Žalgiris. Neptūnas recovered from the loss by crushing rival BC Lietkabelis 100–76 in Panevėžys, tying Rytas for second place in the standings. On January 6, the first game of the new year, Neptūnas shocked Žalgiris again, this time winning a double overtime thriller at home, 98–93. This win helped Neptūnas retain the second place over Rytas in the standings. A shocking loss to BC Pieno žvaigždės at home, 77–80, lead to Neptūnas giving the spot up to Rytas. Neptūnas returned to the second place the next week, after Rytas suffered a loss themselves. On March 3, Neptūnas shocked Žalgiris again, with an 81–71 win at home, and becoming the first team in since 2014 to beat Žalgiris in a season series. The win helped Neptūnas retain second place in the standings over Rytas. On March 30, however, after a very poor fourth quarter, Neptūnas lost to Rytas in Vilnius, 52–70, and lost the second place to Rytas. On April 11, Neptūnas picked up a dominating home win over Rytas, 89–74, continuing the battle for second place. An 8-game win streak followed, and even after an 80–90 loss to Žalgiris on May 9 snapped it, Neptūnas had already secured second place and homecourt advantage in the playoffs. Neptūnas finished with a 28–8 record. Neptūnas defeated SkyCop Prienai 2–1 in the quarterfinals. In the semifinals, Neptūnas faced rivals Rytas. Having homecourt advantage for the first time, Neptūnas started the series at home – however, Neptūnas played the worst game of the season, with Rytas taking a lead at halftime, and increasing it by the end, taking a 75–46 win in Klaipėda, with Neptūnas even hearing boos from the fans. In the second game, Neptūnas desperately needed the win, to take the series back to Klaipėda - in a tension filled match, where team captain Galdikas even received an ejection, Neptūnas started poorly, with Rytas taking a huge lead at halftime. By the end, Neptūnas was only able to cut down the deficit – 70-83 and a very disappointing 0–2 loss. In the 3rd place series, Neptūnas faced Lietkabelis, in a rematch from last season, which Neptūnas won, and the King Mindaugas Cup of 2019, where Neptūnas lost. Neptūnas won the series 3–0, with wins at home 89-77 and 84–77, and away 88–75.

At the star of the 2018–19 Basketball Champions League, Neptūnas lost to Virtus Bologna in an away game, 78–83. Neptūnas got their first win by defeating Beşiktaş Sompo Japan 78–63 at home the next week. After a hard-fought away loss to B.C. Oostende, 89–91, Neptūnas rebounded by scoring two wins - a home victory and revenge over SIG Strasbourg 92–83, and finally, an away win against KK Olimpija, 97–88, being led by Jerai Grant and a resurgent Delininkaitis. The win streak was stopped at home by Promitheas Patras B.C., with Neptūnas losing the match 82–83 after some turnovers in the end. In the final game of the first round, Neptūnas suffered one of the worst losses in European competitions, losing to Medi Bayreuth 78–102 in an away loss, finishing with a 3–4 record. Neptūnas recovered at the start of the second round, handing Virtus their first loss in the competition with an 88–85 home win. In Istanbul, Neptūnas lost to Beşiktaş 70–77. Another heartbreaking loss to Oostende, this time at home, 77–79, plummeted Neptūnas to a disastrous 7th place in the standings. However, Neptūnas recovered - sparked by the return of Gailius, Neptūnas finished the regular season with four consecutive wins - an away win over SIG Strasbourg 90–80, a home win over KK Olimpija 82–74, getting revenge over Promitheas Patras with a dominating 82–69 away victory, and defeating Medi Bayeruth 83–73 at home, finishing with an 8–6 record. After Oostende lost at home to SIG, Neptūnas qualified to the playoffs for the third consecutive season, and finished 3rd in standings. In the playoffs, Neptūnas faced Hapoel Jerusalem, one of the top teams in the competition. In the first game at home, Neptūnas lost 74–86. In the rematch, Neptūnas lost 64–84, losing the series on aggregate 138–170.

==== 2019–20 season ====
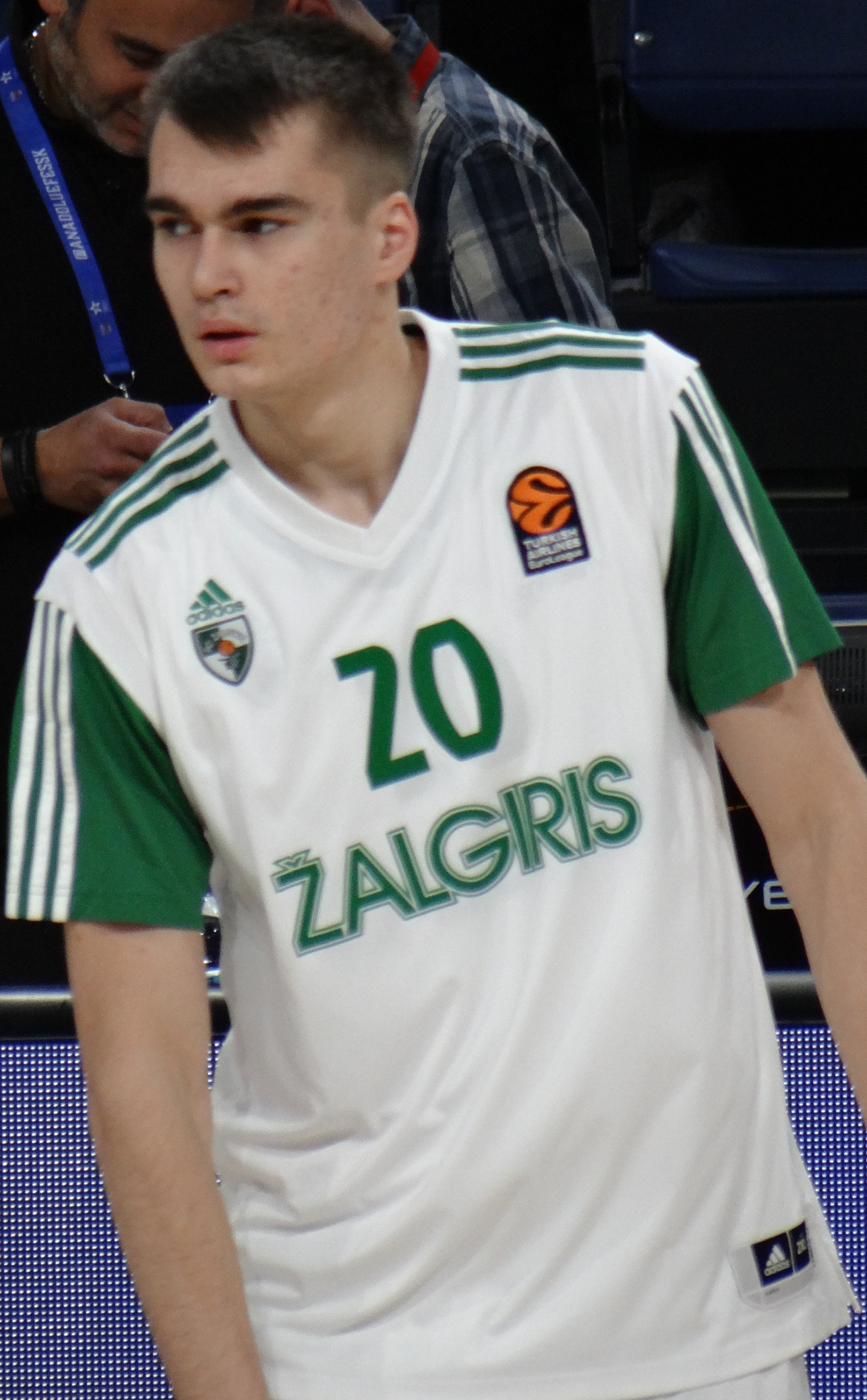
Gytis Masiulis was loaned from Žalgiris Kaunas and was one of Neptunas's key players in the 2019–20 season

The third-place finish helped Neptūnas directly qualify for the 2019-20 Basketball Champions League. Coach Maksvytis, team leader Grant, Williams, Dambrauskas, Bieliauskas, Kisielius and Mikalauskas left during the summer. Assistant coach Tomas Rinkevičius was named as Maksvytis replacement. Neptūnas signed Andre Williamson as the new center to replace Grant, while Darrin Dorsey was a replacement for Williams as the new point guard. Žygimantas Janavičius was also signed to strengthen the point guard position. Masiulis was loaned for one more season by Žalgiris, while another Euroleague team, Kirilobet Baskonia, loaned Tadas Sedekerskis for Neptūnas. Matas Jogėla signed just before the season started. Team veterans Gailius and Delininkaitis remained with the team. Neptūnas won the Vladas Garastas Cup, defeating BC Dnipro 75–63 in the finals, which also served as the club's 55 year anniversary tournament. Longtime captain Martynas Mažeika returned to the team in January.

Neptūnas started off the 2019–20 LKL season by defeating BC Juventus 80–67 at home. Neptūnas struggled in the LKL, and in February, with an 11–9 record and 5th place in the standings, and an early exit in the Champions League also, replaced coach Rinkevičius with assistant Jurica Žuža. Under Žuža, Neptūnas qualified for the King Mindaugas Cup, by beating BC Dzūkija 92–89 away and 73–72 at home, avenging the loss in 2018, and qualifying for the Final Four tournament, held on Neptūnas homecourt Švyturio Arena. Despite promising statements from the management and coach Žuža, the tournament ended with Neptūnas finishing in a disappointing 4th place, suffering a blowout loss in the semifinals to BC Rytas 71–96, and a loss in the 3rd place game to BC Lietkabelis, 73–84. Coach Žuža was then replaced by the coach of the reserve team Neptūnas-Akvaservis, Tomas Gaidamavičius. Due to the COVID-19 pandemic, the LKL season was ended prematurely, with Neptūnas finishing in 4th place.

In the Basketball Champions League, Neptūnas defeated Happy Casa Brindisi 81–71 in the home opener. In the second game, Neptūnas faced JDA Dijon, also at home - despite the best efforts from Neptūnas, JDA Dijon took a huge lead at halftime, and won the game 89–75. Tied at 1-1, Neptūnas won the first away game of the tournament, beating PAOK 94–72 in Thessaloniki. Neptūnas then defeated Casademont Zaragoza 91–73 at home. Neptūnas lost to Telekom Baskets Bonn, 85–97, in an away game. Neptūnas finished the first round with a home win over Beşiktaş J.K. 86–80, and an away loss to Falco KC, 73–97, tied for 3rd place with a 4–3 record. The second round, however, ended up with failure - Neptūnas suffered away losses to both Brindisi and JDA Dijon, 82–96 and 71–92, a very painful home loss to PAOK 80–86, and lost to Casademonet Zaragoza, 70–86, losing 5 consecutive games for the first time in the competition. While Neptūnas defeated Telekom Baskets 93–68 at home, an away loss to Beşiktaş, 69–76, ended any hope for Neptūnas to reach the playoffs, for the first time since joining the competition. Neptūnas finished the competition with a win at home over Falco KC, 87–83, finishing 6th with a 6–8 record.

=== The pandemic difficulties (2020–2022) ===
==== 2020–21 season ====
Neptūnas faced off with the financial difficulties when the rest of the 2019–20 season was cancelled due to the COVID-19 pandemic, therefore the club formed its next season roster mostly from young Lithuanian players and had no foreign players. Starting the 2020–21 season, Neptūnas participated in the 2020–21 Basketball Champions League season Qualification Group D, where it defeated the London Lions 77–73 in the semi-finals, however the team failed to qualify to the regular season after losing the qualification final to the BC Tsmoki-Minsk 69–59, and played only in the Lithuanian League. In the LKL, Neptūnas became the surprise team of the year. Under coach Tomas Gaidamavičius, the young team with some veteran leadership, led by players like Martynas Mažeika, Žygimantas Janavičius and Matas Jogėla, were in playoff contention all season long. Evaldas Šaulys, Džiugas Slavinskas, among others, also had good seasons. Deividas Gailius returned near the end of the season to Neptūnas, immediately becoming the team leader and leading Neptūnas to the 6th seed in the regular season. In the King Mindaugas Cup, Neptūnas also reached the semifinals. Neptūnas nearly upset the heavily favored Lietkabelis Panevėžys in the playoffs, and while getting swept in the playoffs, gave Neptūnas fans hope for the future.

==== 2021–22 season ====
Before the 2021–2022 season, Neptūnas largely kept the same core as in the previous season, re-signed Deividas Gailius, and also signed the returning Edgaras Želionis, one of the best players for Neptūnas back in the 2017–2018 season. Neptūnas, having higher expectations for the season, expected to continue where they left off the previous season. However, the season began disastrously for Neptūnas. By December, Neptūnas was coming off a losing streak, which included many blow-out loses, and was out of playoff contention in the LKL. Needing changes, coach Gaidamavičius was released by Neptūnas, and in a surprising move, Dainius Adomaitis returned as the head coach of Neptūnas. Neptūnas regained their form - in the LKL, by April, Neptūnas had risen up to the 7th seed in the standings. Neptūnas finished the LKL regular season with a memorable 93–88 win over Rytas Vilnius in the regular season final. In the playoffs, Neptūnas faced Žalgiris Kaunas, now coached by former Neptūnas head coach Kazys Maksvytis. Neptūnas surprised all critics – they managed to stretch the series out to all five games, with Žalgiris winning 92-88 and 87–71 in Kaunas, and Neptūnas winning 70-68 and 87–78 in Klaipėda, and only in the deciding fifth game did Žalgiris finish off Neptūnas, 89–60 in Kaunas, to win the series 3–2. Gailius, along with the biggest surprise of the series, Nojus Mineikis, all shined during the series. After the season, Adomaitis once again left Neptūnas.

In the King Mindaugas Cup, Neptūnas dominated the group stage, and came close to eliminating future LKL finalists, Lietkabelis Panevėžys - Lietkabelis were the heavy favorites, but a narrow win in Klaipėda, 73–69, barely saved them from elimination as Neptūnas lead for most of the game in Panevėžys - where Lietkabelis had very few losses all season - before finishing the game with an 80–80 tie - the tie meaning Lietkabelis advancing on aggregate, 153–149. Lietkabelis later went all the way to the finals, where they lost to Žalgiris.

=== 2022–present ===
==== 2022–23 season ====
During the summer, coach Adomaitis left the team. Neptūnas decided to promote assistant coach Mindaugas Brazys to the head coaching position. Neptūnas rebuilt much of the team. Neptūnas initially struggled during the beginning of the season, going 0–4 at the start of the LKL season, before strong play from players like the returning Mindaugas Girdžiūnas, Deividas Gailius, career seasons from Matas Jogėla and Austin Wiley, the best of the new arrivals, brought Neptūnas back to LKL playoff contention, and having competitive matches against all top LKL teams. Neptūnas finished the regular season with a 16–17 record, and 7th place in the regular season. In the LKL quarterfinals, Neptūnas faced long time rivals and defending LKL champions Rytas Vilnius - Rytas beat Neptūnas in a very tough, very competitive series, needing overtime to beat Neptūnas at home 107–99, and finishing Neptūnas 95–91 in Klaipėda, to win the series 2–0. In the King Mindaugas Cup, Neptūnas won the group stage over the newly established and heavily favored BC Wolves. However, in the quarterfinal stage, Neptūnas could not beat CBet Jonava, who beat Neptūnas both in Klaipėda 85–80, and in Jonava 76–75. Long time player Martynas Mažeika, whose number was retired by Neptūnas during the season, also returned to the team, this time as club director.

==== 2023–24 season ====
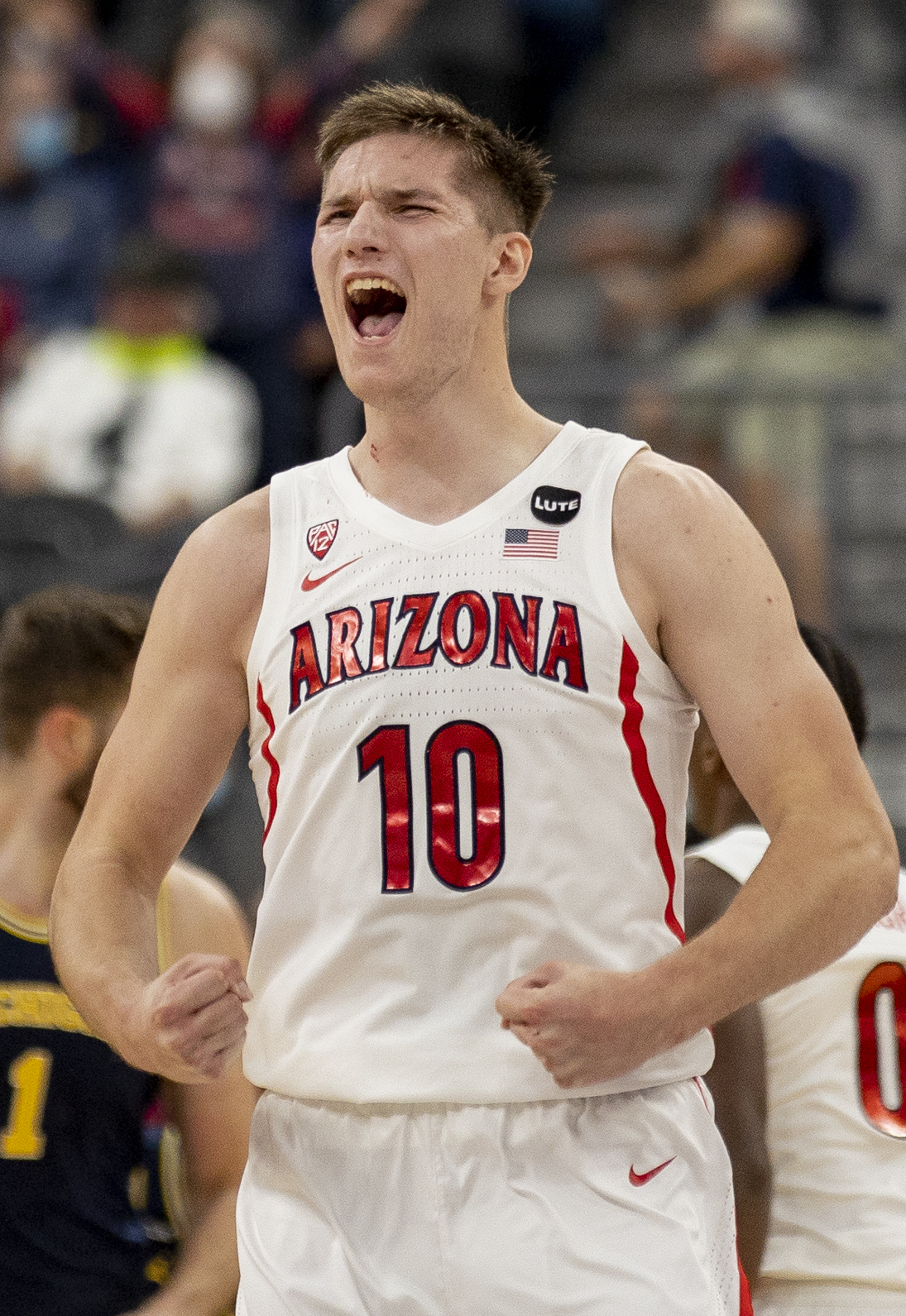
Ąžuolas Tubelis, 2023–24 LKL season MVP

For the 2023–2024 season, Brazys remained as Neptūnas head coach. Neptūnas signed Sterling Gibbs and Ignas Sargiūnas as the new point guards, Tommy Rutherford and Tim Lambrecht, one of the biggest stars of the LKL the previous season with BC Nevėžis, as well as re-signing Girdžiūnas and Gailius. Jogėla, Wiley and Pleikys became the biggest departures for the team. The renewed Neptūnas started the LKL with a big win over 7-Bet Lietkabelis, 91–81, at home. In November, Neptūnas was also loaned, from Rytas, who had signed Pleikys during the summer, Ąžuolas Tubelis, who quickly became team leader for Neptūnas. Neptūnas went on a four-game win streak during November–December, including a big win over BC Žalgiris in Kaunas.

The mid-season retirement by Gibbs, however, shocked Neptūnas - Neptūnas was eliminated in the King Mindaugas Cup by Lietkabelis, after winning the first game 91–89 in Klaipėda, lost in Panevėžys 76–79, losing by just one point on aggregate. In the LKL, at the start of March, Neptūnas had just a 6–12 record, just barely in the playoffs. Needing changes, Neptūnas made the decision to replace Brazys with longtime Panathinaikos Athens assistant and head coach Georgios Vovoras. Some roster changes also included signing of shooting guard Georgios Kamperidis. The changes instantly changed Neptūnas - who went on a club record eight-game win streak in the LKL, including wins over Lietkabelis (twice to sweep the season series), Žalgiris (a double overtime thriller) and also an amazing win in Vilnius over BC Rytas, 84–83, on a game winning basket by Tubelis. Attendances at the Švyturio Arena once again started to rise. Neptūnas finished the LKL regular season with a 14–16 record, in 6th place in the standings. Tubelis was named the MVP of the LKL regular season and his duo with Sargiūnas was considered as one of the very best in the LKL.

In the LKL playoffs, Neptūnas faced off the heavily favored BC Wolves - one of the assistants for the Wolves was Mindaugas Brazys, signed after getting released by Neptūnas. Wolves beat Neptūnas in Vilnius 91–84, before Neptūnas beat the Wolves, 95–76, in Klaipėda to tie the series 1-1. Despite a monster performance by Sargiūnas, who scored 27 points, Neptūnas succumbed in the deciding third game of the quarterfinals - Wolves beat Neptūnas 91–80 in Vilnius to win the series 2–1. Despite the loss, the amazing performance by Neptūnas in the second half of the season led to Neptūnas re-signing Vovaros.

==== 2024–25 season ====
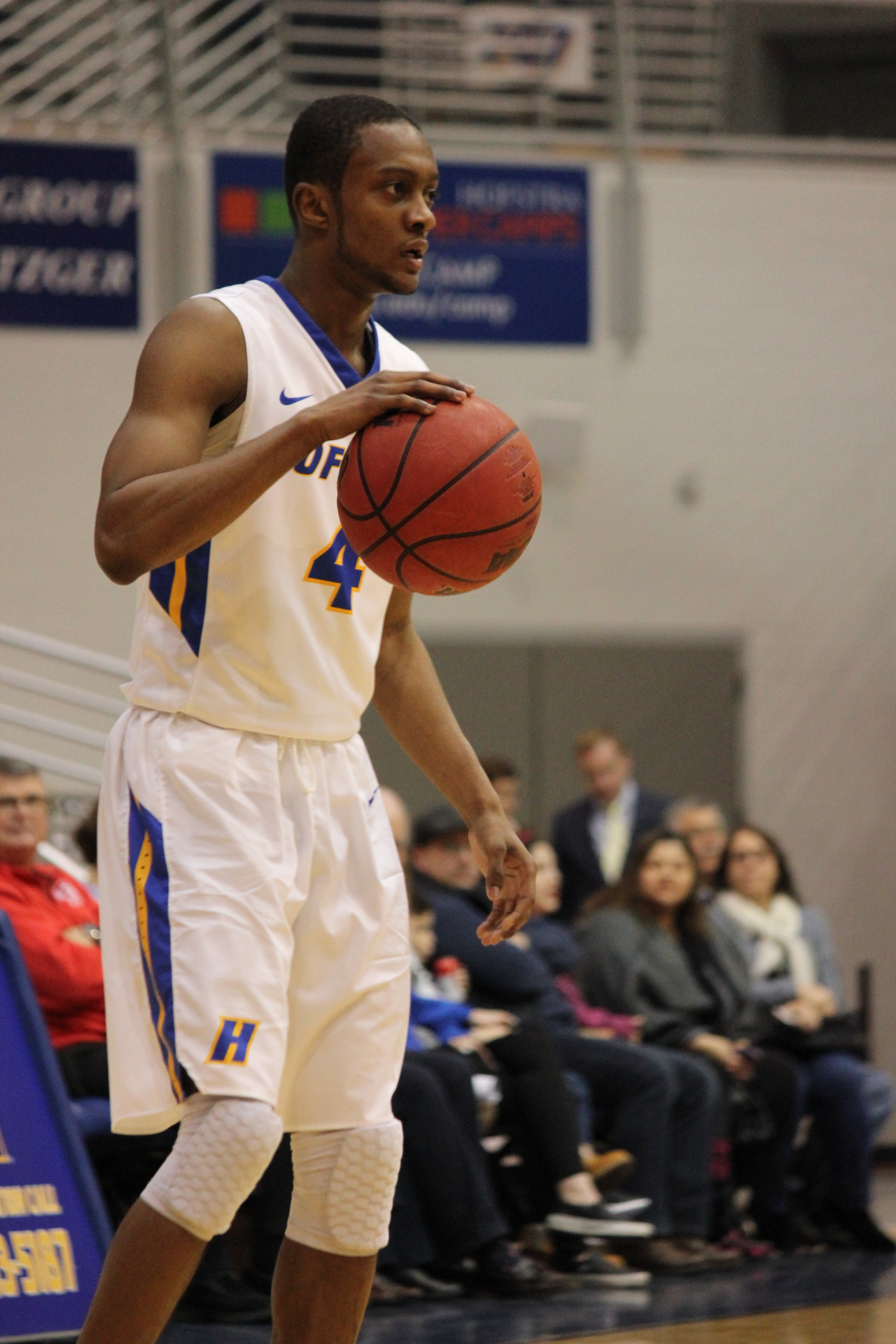
Desure Buie, one of Neptūnas's leaders in the 2024–25 season

Due to the good finish to the previous year, Neptūnas had high expecations for the 2024–2025 season. Vovaros was re-signed at the end of the previous season. Neptūnas changed up much of the roster, with Tubelis and Sargiūnas leaving for BC Rytas being the biggest departures. Neptūnas signed guards Nate Johnson and Desure Buie, who quickly emerged as the new team leaders, forward Arnas Beručka from the Wolves, Zane Waterman, leader of BC Nevėžis and Tomáš Pavelka from BC Šiauliai to form the front court with Martynas Pacevičius, who remained with Neptūnas during the summer. Neptūnas also resigned Gailius, Girdžiūnas and Janavičius to new contracts. During the year, Dimitrios Agravanis had a short stint with Neptūnas while replacing the injured Pacevičius, and Neptūnas also signed Myles Hesson to strengthen the front-court. Neptūnas also returned to the European competitions, playing in the 2024–25 FIBA Europe Cup qualifiers - while Neptūnas lost to Surne Bilbao Basket, 66-74 and 59-95, it can be considered just bad luck as Bilbao went on to win the whole competition.

In the LKL, Neptūnas started the season with a big away win over defending champions Rytas in Vilnius, 90-84. Neptūnas started the LKL with a 4–0 start, including wins over the Wolves-Twinsbet and 7-Bet Lietkabelis. Neptūnas had a 6–3 record after the first round of the LKL. In the King Mindaugas Cup, Neptūnas barely qualified for the playoffs, before going on an amazing run - in the playoffs, Neptūnas faced off Rytas - with Rytas winning the first game in Klaipėda, 78-67. The second game in Vilnius was largely considered a formality. By the second half, Neptūnas had taken the lead from Rytas, and in the fourth quarter, lead by Buie, proceeded to give one of the biggest upsets in the competition's history by beating Rytas 92-77 and winning on aggregate, thus eliminating Rytas from the competition - with Neptūnas fans managing to quiet down the Rytas fans in Vilnius - Neptūnas returned to the Final Four, held in Vilnius, for the first time since 2021. In the semifinals, Neptūnas, again huge underdogs, faced the Wolves, hosts of the competition - supported by their own fans Neptūnas defeated the Wolves 87–83 to reach the finals for the first time in club history. In the finals, again massive underdogs, Neptūnas faced BC Žalgiris - the absolute competition favorite. Supported by now thousands of Neptūnas fans in the Vilnius, Neptūnas took fight to the defending champions, including a double-digit lead, before Žalgiris came back and even took a double-digit lead of their own in the final quarter. This time, Neptūnas fought back - in the closing seconds, after a three-pointer by Gailius, Neptūnas took a slim lead, before Žalgiris regained the lead - Gailius missed the deciding three-pointer and Žalgiris defeated Neptūnas 91–89 to win the finals. The silver-medal finish became the best finish ever by Neptūnas in the competition. Buie lead Neptūnas throughout the competition.

For the rest of the season, however, Neptūnas fell apart - winning the next 3 out of 14 games, Neptūnas plummeted in the standings in the LKL, going from leading the league to barely fighting for a spot in the playoffs. In April, Neptūnas made a very unpopular decision to replace Vovaros, the architect of the King Mindaugas Cup silver medal, with his assistant Vidas Ginevičius - the results under Ginevičius were mixed, while Neptūnas qualified for the LKL playoffs, a 14–22 record and an 8th place in the standings meant Neptūnas was forced to face Žalgiris in the LKL playoffs. Facing a Žalgiris team that was on a 30-game win streak, few thought Neptūnas would be a suitable match - while Žalgiris did face a fight from Neptūnas in Kaunas, winning 88-75, in Klaipėda, the match was a pale imitation the battle in the King Mindaugas Cup finals - Žalgiris won 98-70 and ended a very disappointing year for Neptūnas with a 2–0 series win.

==== 2025–26 season ====
Arnas Velička, 2025–26 LKL season MVP

Neptūnas signed Gediminas Petrauskas as the new head coach during the summer, on a long term contract. Petrauskas had been the head coach for Nevėžis Kėdainiai, and was known for his good work with the developing of young players, as well as constantly being in playoff contention despite the fact that Nevėžis had the smallest resources in the league - Nevėžis was close to eliminating Neptūnas for the last spot of the LKL playoffs the year before. Neptūnas also earned a spot in the EuroCup Basketball competition, taking the place of the dissolved Wolves-Twinsbet. Much of the previous season's team departed Neptūnas, with Johnson, Buie, Pavelka, Hesson all departing, and Janavičius retiring. The saddest of departures came when Gailius left during the summer. Earning a EuroCup spot, Neptūnas made much bigger moves in the off-season - the key signings were Arnas Velička, the national team point guard, shooting guard and Latvian team leader Rihards Lomažs and Donatas Tarolis, former Žalgiris and Lietkabelis player, who returned after a long absence to the LKL. Girdžiūnas, Pacevičius, Waterman (a favorite of Petrauskas during his days with Nevėžis) and Beručka remained, while Neptūnas also signed former Nevėžis player Vitalijus Kozys and point guard Harrison Cleary to help Velička at the point guard position. During the season, Jordan Tucker (later replaced by Maks Klanjscek) also briefly played for Neptūnas, and while Pacevičius was injured, Neptūnas also briefly signed Egidijus Mockevičius, on a short-term deal, as center - he was later replaced by Aurimas Majauskas and Latvian center Kārlis Šiliņš full-time.

Under Petrauskas, Neptūnas changed their style. In the 2025–26 EuroCup Basketball season, Neptūnas finished just two games out of the playoffs - playing in a group with Hapoel Midtown Jerusalem (93-110 away and 98-92 at home), Bahçeşehir Koleji (100-85 away and 86-91 at home), KK Cedevita Olimpija (94-91 away and 85-104 at home), Umana Reyer Venezia (69-89 away and 103-118 at home), Baxi Manresa (100-87 at home and 96-97 away), U-BT Cluj-Napoca (102-107 at home and 97-118 away), Aris Betsson (87-93 at home and 64-83 away), Śląsk Wrocław (85-95 away and 103-87 at home) and Veolia Towers Hamburg (97-88 at home and 98-94 away), Neptūnas became one of the top offensive teams in the competition, while also placing in last place in defense. A lack of strong center after an injury to Pacevičius also cost Neptūnas deeply. Lomažs and Velička, along with Tarolis, had their best years ever in the competition.

In the King Mindaugas Cup, where Neptūnas went all the way to the finals the previous year, Neptūnas eliminated Petrauskas former team Nevėžis in the quarter-finals - winning 87-76 away and 87-67 at home, but could not repeat their success in the semifinal rematch, held in Šiauliai, against Žalgiris Kaunas - Žalgiris easily beat Neptūnas 119-81 in the previous year's finals clash. In the bronze medal game, Neptūnas was defeated by Lietkabelis Panevėžys, in a bit of an upset, as Lietkabelis dominated Neptūnas 94-73 to win the game.

In the LKL, Neptūnas had their best year since 2018-2019 - Neptūnas finished third in the standings, with a 17-15 record - over BC Šiauliai. Velička was named the LKL MVP for the season. In the LKL quarter-finals, Neptūnas faced, and defeated, BC Gargždai, the new team of former long-time player Gailius, 2-0 (100-73 at home and 84-74 away) to qualify for the LKL semi-finals for the first time since 2019. In the semi-finals, Neptūnas faced the Cinderella team of Juventus Utena, who shockingly upset multiple time champions Rytas Vilnius in the quarter-finals. Neptūnas was considered a heavy favorite against the underdog Juventus team - and a heavy favorite to face Žalgiris in the LKL finals. Juventus had other plans - Neptūnas was soundly beaten at home, and away, with Juventus winning 96-83 in Klaipėda and 87-83 in Utena, to take a 2-0 series lead. Even though Neptūnas managed a win over Juventus in Klaipėda, 102-84, it was Juventus who got the last laugh with a 103-90 win in Utena - surprisingly beating Neptūnas 3-1 in the semifinals. Despite the disappointing finish in the semifinals, Neptūnas faced Lietkabelis in the bronze medal series - Lietkabelis had won the previous three bronze medals in the LKL. Neptūnas started with a 86-73 win at home, before Lietkabelis won 80-68 (despite a big lead by Neptūnas in the second quarter) in Panevėžys to tie the series at 1-1. The third game became a defensive clash, with Neptūnas playing their best defense of the season - Šiliņš won the game for Neptūnas with a buzzer-beating three pointer, 66-63. The fourth game in Panevėžys became a mirror image to the second one - Neptūnas took a big lead before Lietkabelis made a comeback. This time, clutch baskets from Velička, Lomažs and in particular, Tarolis, helped Neptūnas beat Lietkabelis 91-82 to win the series 3-1, and winning the LKL bronze medals - their first since 2019.

== Players ==
=== Retired numbers ===
Neptūnas Klaipėda retired numbers
No.	Nat.	Player	Position	Tenure	Ceremony date
5	(Lithuania)	Arvydas Macijauskas	SG	1997–1999	22 May 2014
9	(Lithuania)	Eurelijus Žukauskas	C	1994–1997	22 May 2014
7	(Lithuania)	Martynas Mažeika	SG	2000–2004; 2008–2009; 2010–2017; 2020–2022	10 April 2023

=== Current roster ===
Note: Flags indicate national team eligibility at FIBA-sanctioned events. Players may hold other non-FIBA nationalities not displayed.

BC Neptūnas roster
Players
Coaches

Pos.	No.	Nat.	Name	Ht.	Wt.	Age
F	0	(Estonia)	Drell, Henri	2.06 m (6 ft 9 in)	100 kg (220 lb)	26 – 25 April 2000
F/C	1	(Lithuania)	Tarolis, Donatas	2.03 m (6 ft 8 in)	98 kg (216 lb)	32 – 30 March 1994
G/F	5	(Netherlands)	Franke, Yannick	1.96 m (6 ft 5 in)	84 kg (185 lb)	30 – 21 May 1996
G	7	(Lithuania)	Šarakauskas, Simas	1.89 m (6 ft 2 in)	80 kg (176 lb)	19 – 4 July 2007
G	8	(Lithuania)	Girdžiūnas, Mindaugas (C)	1.88 m (6 ft 2 in)	86 kg (190 lb)	37 – 20 January 1989
PG	10	(Iceland)	Friðriksson, Elvar Már	1.83 m (6 ft 0 in)	78 kg (172 lb)	31 – 11 November 1994
G	13	(Lithuania)	Žemaitis, Kristupas	1.92 m (6 ft 4 in)	85 kg (187 lb)	30 – 24 June 1996
C	14	(Lithuania)	Echodas, Martynas	2.06 m (6 ft 9 in)	106 kg (234 lb)	29 – 7 July 1997
C	17	(United States)	Somerville, Raymond	2.11 m (6 ft 11 in)	107 kg (236 lb)	26 – 31 July 2000
G/F	21	(Lithuania)	Beručka, Arnas	1.96 m (6 ft 5 in)	91 kg (201 lb)	29 – 17 March 1997
F/C	37	(Lithuania)	Tubutis, Einaras	2.07 m (6 ft 9 in)	95 kg (209 lb)	27 – 4 November 1998
G/F	88	(Lithuania)	Kreišmontas, Lukas	1.99 m (6 ft 6 in)	92 kg (203 lb)	25 – 8 April 2001

Head coach

- (Lithuania) Gediminas Petrauskas

Assistant coach(es)

- (Lithuania) Vaidas Pauliukėnas
- (Lithuania) Simonas Serapinas
- (Greece) Dimitrios Rekas

Athletic trainer(s)

- (Lithuania) Laurynas Gendvilas

Physiotherapist(s)

- (Lithuania) Martynas Macas

Team manager

- (Lithuania) Dainius Vaitelis

Legend

- (C) Team captain
- Injured

- Roster
Updated: September 19, 2026

=== Depth chart ===
Pos.	Starting 5	Bench 1	Bench 2
C	Martynas Echodas	Raymond Somerville
PF	Donatas Tarolis	Einaras Tubutis
SF	Henri Drell	Lukas Kreišmontas	Arnas Beručka
SG	Yannick Franke	Mindaugas Girdžiūnas
PG	Elvar Már Friðriksson	Kristupas Žemaitis	Simas Šarakauskas

=== Squad changes for/during the 2026–27 season ===
==== In ====
No.	Pos.	Nat.	Name	Moving from	
0	F	(Estonia)	Henri Drell	Joventut Badalona	(Spain)
5	G/F	(Netherlands)	Yannick Franke	Petkim Spor	(Turkey)
7	G	(Lithuania)	Simas Šarakauskas	Klaipėdos Neptūnas-Akvaservis	(Lithuania)
10	PG	(Iceland)	Elvar Már Friðriksson	La Laguna Tenerife	(Spain)
13	G	(Lithuania)	Kristupas Žemaitis	Napoli Basket	(Italy)
14	C	(Lithuania)	Martynas Echodas	Rytas Vilnius	(Lithuania)
17	C	(United States)	Raymond Somerville	TFT	(North Macedonia)
37	F/C	(Lithuania)	Einaras Tubutis	Arka Gdynia	(Poland)
88	G/F	(Lithuania)	Lukas Kreišmontas	Jonava Hipocredit	(Lithuania)

==== Out ====
No.	Pos.	Nat.	Name	Moving to	
0	G	(United States)	Harrison Cleary	Rapid București	(Romania)
2	G	(Lithuania)	Radvilas Kneižys	BG Göttingen	(Germany)
6	G/F	(Latvia)	Rihards Lomažs	Free agent	
9	C	(Lithuania)	Martynas Pacevičius	BC Šiauliai	(Lithuania)
10	F	(Lithuania)	Vitalijus Kozys	BC Tauragė	(Lithuania)
11	PG	(Lithuania)	Arnas Velička	Brisbane Bullets	(Australia)
13	F/C	(Lithuania)	Aurimas Majauskas	Força Lleida	(Spain)
15	G/F	(Slovenia)	Maks Klanjscek	Free agent	
16	C	(Lithuania)	Matas Mačijauskas	Olimpas Plungė	(Lithuania)
24	F/C	(United States)	Zane Waterman	Dziki Warsaw	(Poland)
25	F/C	(Latvia)	Kārlis Šiliņš	Básquet Coruña	(Spain)
77	G	(Lithuania)	Kristupas Leščiauskas	Free agent	

== Logos ==
Classic logo (1964–2011)

2010s logo (2011–2019)

55th anniversary logo (2019–2020)

Neptūnas logo since 2020 until 2024 (2020–2024)

Current logo (2024–present)

== Honours ==
=== Domestic competitions ===
- Lithuanian SSR Championship

Winners (1): 1962

- Lithuanian Basketball League

Runners-up (2): 2014, 2016
3rd place (4): 2013, 2018, 2019, 2026

- King Mindaugas Cup

Runners-up (1): 2025
3rd place (1): 2016

== Club achievements ==
Season	League	Pos.	Regional competitions	Pos.	LKF Cup KMT Cup	European competitions	
1993–94	LKL	10th					
1994–95	LKL	10th					
1995–96	LKL	7th					
1996–97	LKL	5th					
1997–98	LKL	9th					
1998–99	LKL	6th				3 Korać Cup	R32
1999–00	LKL	8th				3 Korać Cup	GS
2000–01	LKL	5th					
2001–02	LKL	8th					
2002–03	LKL	6th					
2003–04	LKL	10th				4 Europe Cup	QF
2004–05	LKL	5th	BBL Elite Division	5th			
2005–06	LKL	6th	BBL Elite Division	10th			
2006–07	LKL	4th	BBL Elite Division	12th			
2007–08	LKL	5th	BBL Elite Division	16th	Fourth qualified		
2008–09	LKL	4th	BBL Challenge Cup	6th	Eighth finalist		
2009–10	LKL	5th	BBL Challenge Cup	4th	Quarter-finalist		
2010–11	LKL	8th	BBL Challenge Cup	4th	Fourth qualified		
2011–12	LKL	6th	BBL Challenge Cup	6th	Second round		
2012–13	LKL	3rd	VTB League	10th	Fifth round		
2013–14	LKL	2nd	VTB League	8th	Fifth round	2 Eurocup	RS
2014–15	LKL	4th			Fifth round	1 Euroleague	RS
2014–15	LKL	4th			Fifth round	2 Eurocup	R32
2015–16	LKL	2nd			Bronze medal	2 Eurocup	R32
2016–17	LKL	4th			Quarterfinals	3 Champions League	R16
2017–18	LKL	3rd			Quarterfinals	3 Champions League	R16
2018–19	LKL	3rd			Semifinals	3 Champions League	R16
2019–20	LKL	4th			Semifinals	3 Champions League	RS
2020–21	LKL	6th			Fourth place		
2021–22	LKL	7th			Quarterfinals		
2022–23	LKL	7th			Quarterfinals		
2023–24	LKL	6th			Quarterfinals		
2024–25	LKL	8th			Runner–up	4 Europe Cup	QR
2025–26	LKL	3rd			Fourth place	2 EuroCup	RS

Detailed information of former rosters and results.

=== LKL playoffs ===
- 2001–2002 season 8th (lost quarter-finals against Lietuvos Rytas 0–2)
- 2002–2003 season 6th (lost quarter-finals against Šiauliai 0–2)
- 2004–2005 season 5th (lost quarter-finals against Šiauliai 1–2)
- 2006–2007 season 4th (lost bronze final against Šiauliai 0–3)
- 2008–2009 season 4th (lost bronze final against Šiauliai 2–3)
- 2009–2010 season 5th (lost quarter-finals against Juventus 0–2)
- 2010–2011 season 8th (lost quarter-finals against Žalgiris 0–2)
- 2011–2012 season 6th (lost quarter-finals against Šiauliai 1–2)
- 2012–2013 season 3rd (won bronze final against Prienai 3–2)
- 2013–2014 season 2nd (lost grand final against Žalgiris 2–4)
- 2014–2015 season 4th (lost bronze final against Juventus 2–3)
- 2015–2016 season 2nd (lost grand final against Žalgiris 1–4)
- 2016–2017 season 4th (lost bronze final against Lietuvos Rytas 2–3)
- 2017–2018 season 3rd (won bronze final against Lietkabelis 3–1)
- 2018–2019 season: 3rd (won bronze final against Lietkabelis 3–0)
- 2019–2020 season: 4th (the playoffs did not take place and the season was ended prematurely because of coronavirus pandemic)
- 2020–2021 season: 6th (lost quarter-finals against Lietkabelis 0–2)
- 2021–2022 season: 7th (lost quarter-finals against Žalgiris 2–3)
- 2022–2023 season: 7th (lost quarter-finals against Rytas 0–2)
- 2023–2024 season: 6th (lost quarter-finals against Wolves Twinsbet 1–2)
- 2024–2025 season: 8th (lost quarter-finals against Žalgiris 0–2)
- 2025–2026 season: 3rd (won bronze final against Lietkabelis 3–1)

== Individual awards ==
=== Domestic ===
LKL Most Valuable Player

- (Lithuania) Ąžuolas Tubelis – 2024
- (Lithuania) Arnas Velička – 2026

LKL Coach of the Year

- (Lithuania) Dainius Adomaitis – 2016

Three-point Shootout Champions

- (Lithuania) Svajūnas Airošius – 1997, 1999
- (Lithuania) Petras Šalvis – 2005
- (Lithuania) Marius Kasiulevičius – 2006
- (Lithuania) Marius Runkauskas – 2008, 2013, 2014
- (Lithuania) Marius Kasiulevičius – 2009
- (Lithuania) Osvaldas Olisevičius – 2020

Slam Dunk Contest Champions

- (United States) Antonio Grant – 2005

== Notable players ==
Note: Flags indicate national team eligibility at FIBA-sanctioned events. Players may hold other non-FIBA nationalities not displayed.

Criteria

To appear in this section a player must have either:

- Set a club record or won an individual award while at the club
- Played at least one official international match for their national team at any time
- Played at least one official NBA match at any time.

- A foreign international player who has significantly contributed into the results of the club.
- A Lithuanian player who has significantly contributed into the results of the club.

- Lithuanians:
- (Lithuania) Tomas Vanagas 1993–2000
- (Lithuania) Gintautas Bendžius 1993–1996, 1999–2000
- (Lithuania) Artūras Jakubauskas 1994–1997
- (Lithuania) Aloyzas Vasiliūnas 1994–1997
- (Lithuania) Eurelijus Žukauskas 1994–1997
- (Lithuania) Martynas Purlys 1995–1997
- (Lithuania) Svajūnas Airošius 1995–2000
- (Lithuania) Donatas Zavackas 1996–1998, 2003, 2006, 2014–2016
- (Lithuania) Alvydas Pazdrazdis 1997–1999
- (Lithuania) Arvydas Macijauskas 1997–1999
- (Lithuania) Mindaugas Mockus 1997–2004, 2006–2008
- (Lithuania) Dainius Miliūnas 1998–2000
- (Lithuania) Rolandas Urkis 1998–2001
- (Lithuania) Audrius Mineikis 1999–2005, 2005–2006
- (Lithuania) Gintautas Vileita 1999–2000, 2005–2006
- (Lithuania) Petras Šalvis 2000–2005
- (Lithuania) Vidas Ginevičius 2000–2001
- (Lithuania) Sigitas Kažukauskas 2000–2002
- (Lithuania) Vaidotas Pridotkas 2000–2008
- (Lithuania) Mantas Ruikis 2001–2005, 2010–2012
- (Lithuania) Tomas Delininkaitis 2001–2002, 2017–2020
- (Lithuania) Osvaldas Kurauskas 2005–2006, 2008–2010
- (Lithuania) Vitalijus Stanevičius 2005–2008
- (Lithuania) Vaidotas Pečiukas 2005–2006, 2007–2008
- (Lithuania) Marius Runkauskas 2007–2008, 2011–2014
- (Lithuania) Arvydas Eitutavičius 2008–2009, 2013–2014
- (Lithuania) Valdas Vasylius 2008–2009, 2010–2011, 2013–2015
- Lithuanians (cont):
- (Lithuania) Martynas Mažeika 2000–2004, 2008–2009, 2010–2017, 2020–2022
- (Lithuania) Simas Galdikas 2009–2012, 2012–2015, 2017–2021
- (Lithuania) Mindaugas Girdžiūnas 2009–2012, 2013–2017, 2022–present
- (Lithuania) Giedrius Gustas 2012–2013
- (Lithuania) Martynas Andriuškevičius 2012–2013
- (Lithuania) Vytautas Šarakauskas 2012–2017
- (Lithuania) Arnas Butkevičius 2013–2017
- (Lithuania) Deividas Gailius 2007–2009, 2012–2013, 2014–2015, 2019–2020, 2021–present
- (Lithuania) Laurynas Beliauskas 2014–2019
- (Lithuania) Renaldas Seibutis 2017–2018
- (Lithuania) Laimonas Kisielius 2017–2019
- (Lithuania) Edgaras Želionis 2017–2018, 2021–2022
- (Lithuania) Osvaldas Olisevičius 2018–2020
- (Lithuania) Gytis Masiulis 2018–2020
- (Lithuania) Džiugas Slavinskas 2018–2021
- (Lithuania) Tadas Sedekerskis 2019–2020
- (Lithuania) Matas Jogėla 2019–2023
- (Lithuania) Žygimantas Janavičius 2019–present
- (Lithuania) Rokas Gustys 2022–2023
- (Lithuania) Ąžuolas Tubelis 2023–2024
- Foreigners:
- (United States) Jeff Halloway 2000–2001
- (United States) Kipp Christianson 2002–2003
- (United States) Willie Mitchell 2003–2004
- (Latvia) Jānis Porziņģis 2003–2004
- (United States) Antonio Grant 2004–2005, 2010
- (United States) Sheiku Kabba 2004–2005
- (United States) Jerome Coleman 2005–2006
- (United States) Latece Williams 2005–2006
- (United States) Ron Dorsey 2006–2007
- (Ukraine) (Lithuania) Michailas Anisimovas 2007–2008, 2014
- (United States) Arinze Onuaku 2011
- (United States) Rashaun Broadus 2012–2013
- (United States) Mustafa Shakur 2014–2015
- (United States) Keith Benson 2014–2015
- (United States) Daniel Ewing 2015–2016, 2017
- (United States) Jerai Grant 2015–2017, 2018–2019
- (United States) Travis Bader 2015–2016
- (United States) Jimmy Baron 2016–2017
- (United States) Chris Lofton 2016–2017
- (Colombia) Juan Palacios 2017
- (United States) Kyle Weaver 2018–2019
- (United States) Darrin Dorsey 2019–2020,2021

== Head coaches ==
- Robertas Usaris (1964–1968)
- Antanas Kašiuba (1968–1974)
- Saulius Vilkas (1974–1983)
- Eugenijus Milkontas (1983–1993)
- Stasys Kaupys (1993–1995)
- Grigorijus Pancerovas (1995–1996)
- Rimas Girskis (1996–1999)
- Grigorijus Pancerovas (1994–2004)
- Robertas Kuncaitis (2004–2005)
- Dean Murray (2005–2006)
- Robertas Kuncaitis (2006–2007)
- Aloyzas Rudys (2007–2008)
- Rytis Vaišvila (2008–2009)
- Paulius Juodis (2009–2010)
- Rytis Vaišvila (2010)
- Robertas Kuncaitis (2010–2011)
- Paulius Juodis (2011–2012)
- Osvaldas Kurauskas (2012)
- Kazys Maksvytis (2012–2015)
- Dainius Adomaitis (2015–2017)
- Kazys Maksvytis (2017–2019)
- Tomas Rinkevičius (2019–2020)
- Jurica Žuža (2020)
- Tomas Gaidamavičius (2020–2021)
- Dainius Adomaitis (2021–2022)
- Mindaugas Brazys (2022–2024)
- Georgios Vovoras (2024–2025)
- Vidas Ginevičius (2025) (interim coach)
- Gediminas Petrauskas (2025–present)

== Team management ==
Board Representative

Sigitas Ambrazevičius

Board members

Arunas Tuma
Alvydas Vaiciunas
Edvinas Vaickus
Vytautas Lygnugarys
Vidmantas Dambrauskas

Director of the Club

Sigitas Ambrazevičius

== Statistical leaders ==
=== All-time points per game in all tournaments (PPG) ===
Position	Player	Seasons	Games	Points total	Points per game
1	Martynas Mažeika	15	438	4561	12.29
2	Valdas Vasylius	4	217	2581	11.89
3	Deividas Gailius	4	192	2372	12.35
4	Vaidotas Pridotkas	8	253	2077	8.21
5	Svajūnas Airošius	5	167	1972	9.68
6	Simas Galdikas	5	249	1894	7.6
7	Artūras Jakubauskas	3	112	1830	16.34
8	Audrius Mineikis	7	181	1752	11.80
9	Eurelijus Žukauskas	4	146	1629	11.16
10	Marius Runkauskas	4	154	1507	9.79

== Youth academy ==
Neptūnas closely works with Vladas Knašius Basketball School as a ladder for youth to professional basketball. Players such as Arvydas Macijauskas, Eurelijus Žukauskas, Tomas Delininkaitis, and many players of the current Neptūnas roster attended V. Knašius Basketball School.

== Video game ==
Neptūnas basketball club was featured in the NBA 2K16 video game.
