= Martynas Mažeika =

Lithuanian basketball player

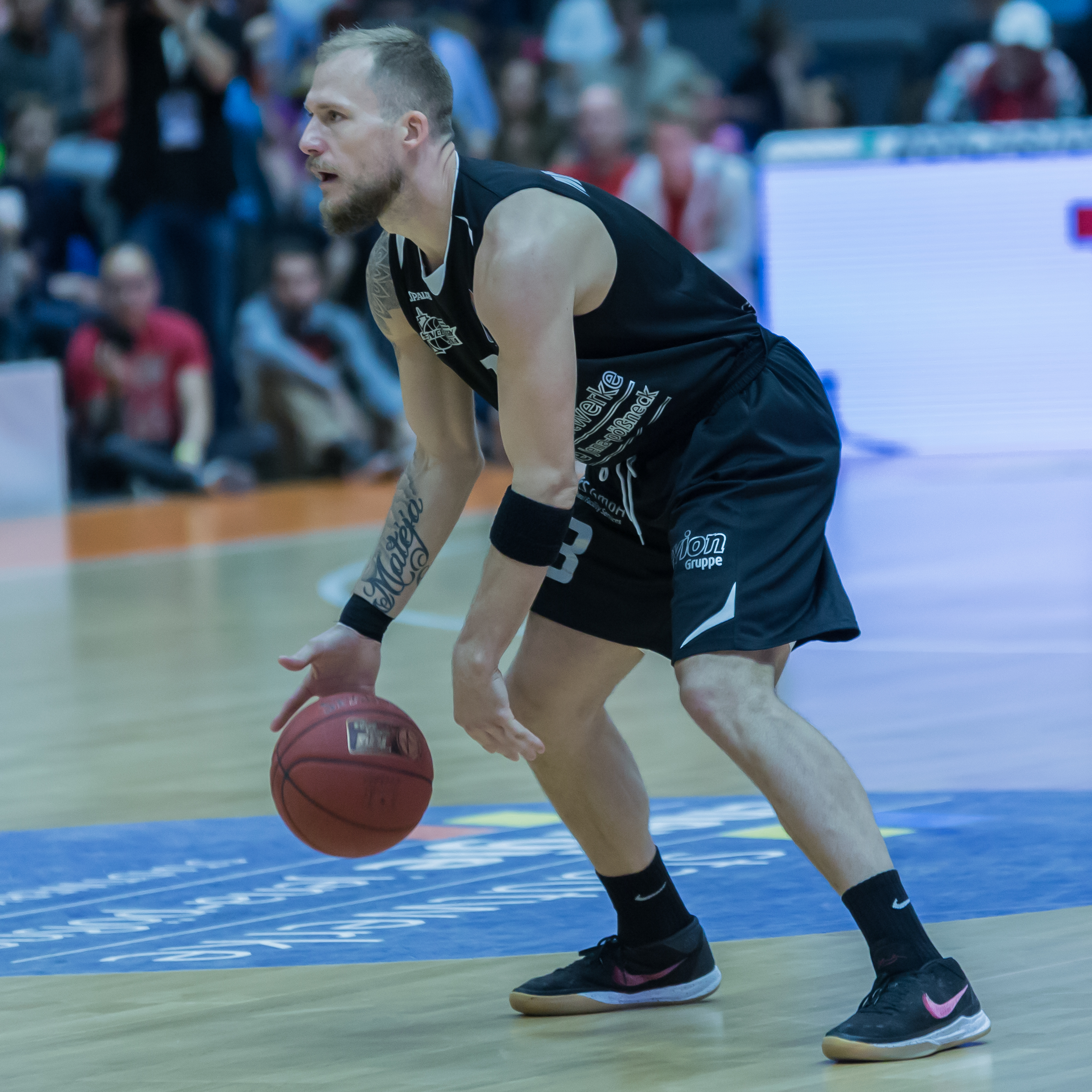
- Mažeika with Science City Jena in 2018

Neptūnas Klaipėda
- Title: General manager
- League: Lithuanian Basketball League

Personal information
- Born: 29 January 1985 (age 41) Klaipėda, Lithuanian SSR, Soviet Union
- Listed height: 193 cm (6 ft 4 in)
- Listed weight: 95 kg (209 lb)

Career information
- NBA draft: 2007: undrafted
- Playing career: 2001–2023
- Position: Shooting guard / point guard

Career history
- 2000–2004: Neptūnas Klaipėda
- 2004–2007: Alba Berlin
- 2006–2007: →Telekom Baskets Bonn
- 2007–2008: Orlandina Basket
- 2008: Khimik
- 2008–2009: Neptūnas Klaipėda
- 2009–2010: VEF Rīga
- 2010: AEK Athens
- 2010–2017: Neptūnas Klaipėda
- 2017: Kalev/Cramo
- 2017–2019: Science City Jena
- 2019: University of Tartu
- 2019–2020: Tallinna Kalev/TLÜ
- 2020–2022: Neptūnas Klaipėda
- 2022–2023: BC Kretinga

Career highlights
- 3× LKL All-Star (2009, 2014, 2015); LKL Defensive Player of the Year (2017); German Cup winner (2006); No. 7 retired by Neptūnas Klaipėda
Medals
Men's basketball
Representing Lithuania
FIBA Europe Under-20 Championship
Silver medal – second place	2005 Russia	National Team

Martynas Mažeika (born 29 January 1985) is a Lithuanian professional basketball executive and former player. At 1.93 m (6 ft 4 in) in height, he played as point guard and shooting guard, preferring the latter position. He is currently the general manager for Neptūnas Klaipėda.

== Professional career ==
Mažeika began his professional career in 2000, aged 15, with the Lithuanian club Neptūnas where he stayed until 2004. He then moved to Alba Berlin for three years, the last one on loan to Telekom Baskets Bonn. He then played at Capo d'Orlando and Khimik. During the 2008–09 season he returned to Neptūnas and started the 2009–10 season with VEF Rīga. On 15 January 2010 he joined the Greek League club A.E.K. Athens. In October 2010 he returned to Neptūnas again. In 2017, he signed with Estonian champions Kalev/Cramo. In October 2017, Mažeika returned to Germany, signing with Science City Jena of the Basketball Bundesliga.

On 1 March 2023, Mažeika retired from professional basketball and became the sports director of Neptūnas Klaipėda. On 20 June, he was appointed the interim general manager of Neptūnas, before becoming general manager on 6 November.

== Lithuania national team ==
Mažeika was a member of the 2001 Lithuanian National Cadet team, the 2002 Lithuanian Junior Team and the 2004 Under 20 Team.

== Euroleague career statistics ==
Legend
GP	Games played	GS	Games started	MPG	Minutes per game
FG%	Field-goal percentage	3P%	3-point field-goal percentage	FT%	Free-throw percentage
RPG	Rebounds per game	APG	Assists per game	SPG	Steals per game
BPG	Blocks per game	PPG	Points per game	PIR	Performance index rating
**Bold**	Career high

Year	Team	GP	GS	MPG	FG%	3P%	FT%	RPG	APG	SPG	BPG	PPG	PIR
2014–15	Neptūnas	9	8	23.0	.294	.208	.714	1.8	1.9	.7	.1	6.1	4.2
Career		9	8	23.0	.294	.208	.714	1.8	1.9	.7	.1	6.1	4.2
