= Lithuania at EuroBasket 2015 =

This page tracks the progress of the Lithuania men's national basketball team participating in EuroBasket 2015.

== Main roster ==
On May 5, head coach Jonas Kazlauskas published the extended 25–player main roster. The list did not included two long-time national team players: Simas Jasaitis and Kšyštof Lavrinovič. On July 9, the shortened roster was announced. All the mentioned players were invited to join the national team training camp in Palanga on July 20.

Lithuania men's national basketball team roster
Players
Coaches

Pos.	No.	Name	Age – Date of birth	Height	Club	Ctr.
G	5	Mantas Kalnietis	28 – 6 September 1986	1.96 m (6 ft 5 in)	Žalgiris Kaunas	(Lithuania)
G/F	6	Deividas Gailius	26 – 26 April 1989	2.00 m (6 ft 7 in)	Lietuvos rytas Vilnius	(Lithuania)
F	8	Jonas Mačiulis	30 – 10 February 1985	1.98 m (6 ft 6 in)	Real Madrid	(Spain)
G	10	Renaldas Seibutis	30 – 23 July 1985	1.96 m (6 ft 5 in)	Žalgiris Kaunas	(Lithuania)
F/C	11	Domantas Sabonis	19 – 3 May 1996	2.08 m (6 ft 10 in)	Gonzaga University Bulldogs	(United States)
C	12	Antanas Kavaliauskas	30 – 19 September 1984	2.09 m (6 ft 10 in)	Lietuvos rytas Vilnius	(Lithuania)
F	13	Paulius Jankūnas	31 – 29 April 1984	2.05 m (6 ft 9 in)	Žalgiris Kaunas	(Lithuania)
C	17	Jonas Valančiūnas	23 – 6 May 1992	2.13 m (7 ft 0 in)	Toronto Raptors	(Canada)
C	15	Robertas Javtokas	35 – 20 March 1980	2.11 m (6 ft 11 in)	Žalgiris Kaunas	(Lithuania)
F	19	Mindaugas Kuzminskas	25 – 19 October 1989	2.05 m (6 ft 9 in)	Unicaja Málaga	(Spain)
G/F	21	Artūras Milaknis	29 – 16 June 1986	1.95 m (6 ft 5 in)	Unics Kazan	(Russia)
G	43	Lukas Lekavičius	21 – 30 March 1994	1.83 m (6 ft 0 in)	Žalgiris Kaunas	(Lithuania)

Head coach

- Jonas Kazlauskas

Assistant coach(es)

- Darius Maskoliūnas
- Gintaras Krapikas

Legend

- Club – describes last
  club before the tournament
- Age – describes age
  on 30 August 2015

=== Candidates that did not make it to the final team ===
#	Position	Player	Year of birth	Club	Reason	Date announced
	Forward/Center	Donatas Motiejūnas	1990	(United States) Houston Rockets	Back injury	June 10
	Guard	Martynas Pocius	1986	(Lithuania) Žalgiris Kaunas	Recurrent back injury	June 26
	Forward	Linas Kleiza	1985	(European Union) Free agent	Needs to rest knee	June 30
	Guard	Martynas Gecevičius	1988	(Turkey) TED Ankara Kolejliler	Not invited to the training camp	July 9
	Guard	Mindaugas Girdžiūnas	1989	(Lithuania) Neptūnas Klaipėda	Not invited to the training camp	July 9
	Guard	Vaidas Kariniauskas	1993	(Greece) Gimnastikos Silogos Kymis	Not invited to the training camp	July 9
	Forward	Gediminas Orelik	1990	(Lithuania) Lietuvos rytas Vilnius	Not invited to the training camp	July 9
	Guard/Forward	Edgaras Ulanovas	1992	(Lithuania) Žalgiris Kaunas	Not invited to the training camp	July 9
	Center	Darjuš Lavrinovič	1979	(Italy) Grissin Bon Reggio Emilia	Injuries	July 14
	Guard	Marius Runkauskas	1986	(Lithuania) Lietuvos rytas Vilnius	Coaching decision	August 16
	Guard/Forward	Rokas Giedraitis	1992	(Lithuania) Lietuvos rytas Vilnius	Coaching decision	August 16
	Guard	Adas Juškevičius	1989	(Lithuania) Lietuvos rytas Vilnius	Coaching decision	August 25
	Guard	Žygimantas Janavičius	1989	(Lithuania) Lietuvos rytas Vilnius	Coaching decision	September 1
	Forward/Center	Artūras Gudaitis	1993	(Lithuania) Lietuvos rytas Vilnius	Coaching decision	September 1

=== Depth chart ===
Pos.	Starting 5	Bench 1	Bench 2
C	Jonas Valančiūnas	Antanas Kavaliauskas	Robertas Javtokas
PF	Paulius Jankūnas	Domantas Sabonis
SF	Jonas Mačiulis	Mindaugas Kuzminskas	Deividas Gailius
SG	Renaldas Seibutis	Artūras Milaknis
PG	Mantas Kalnietis	Lukas Lekavičius

== Preparation matches ==
29 July 2015
19:00 EEST

Report (media)

Lithuania	80–68	Australia
Scoring by quarter: 18–26, 23–15, 16–16, 23–11
Pts: Gudaitis 11; Rebs: Sabonis 7 Asts: Kalnietis, Juškevičius 3		Pts: Motum 19

Švyturys Arena, Lithuania
Attendance: 5,800

28 July 2015
18:30 EEST

Report (media)

Lithuania	92–85	Australia
Scoring by quarter: 20–19, 28–22, 21–17, 23–27
Pts: Kuzminskas, Lekavičius 14; Rebs: Sabonis 8 Asts: Four players 3		Pts: Andersen 20

Šiauliai Arena, Lithuania
Attendance: 5,700

8 August 2015
19:00 EEST

Report (media)

Lithuania	78–71	Finland
Scoring by quarter: 25–18, 19–22, 17–16, 17–15
Pts: Jankūnas 11; Rebs: Sabonis 8 Asts: Kalnietis 11		Pts: Koponen 21

Alytus Arena, Lithuania
Attendance: 5,500

12 August 2015
18:30 EEST

Report (media)

Lithuania	86–71	Austria
Scoring by quarter: 24–18, 21–16, 23–21, 18–16
Pts: Milaknis 18; Rebs: Valančiūnas 10; Asts: Janavičius 8		Pts: Pöltl 27

Kėdainiai Arena, Lithuania
Attendance: 2,500

=== Huawei Cup ===
17 August 2015
19:30 EEST

Report (media)

Lithuania	86–74	Turkey
Scoring by quarter: 27–19, 21–17, 22–16, 16–22
Pts: Jankūnas 14; Rebs: Sabonis 8 Asts: Lekavičius 6		Pts: Savaş 13

Žalgiris Arena, Lithuania
Attendance: 8,660

18 August 2015
19:30 EEST

Report (media)

Lithuania	68–62	(North Macedonia) Macedonia
Scoring by quarter: 11–17, 16–15, 15–18, 26–12
Pts: Kavaliauskas 15; Rebs: Sabonis 10; Asts: Kalnietis 4		Pts: Stojanovski 14; Rebs: Samardžiski 11

Žalgiris Arena, Lithuania

19 August 2015
19:30 EEST

Report (media)

Lithuania	59–72	Croatia
Scoring by quarter: 9–19, 9–20, 15–20, 26–13
Pts: Seibutis 16; Rebs: Mačiulis 6 Asts: Janavičius, Sabonis 3		Pts: Bogdanović 12

Žalgiris Arena, Lithuania
Attendance: 10,839

=== Acropolis International Basketball Tournament ===
27 August 2015
19:00 EEST

Report (media)

Turkey	71–53	Lithuania
Scoring by quarter: 15–15, 15–9, 21–25, 20–4
Pts: İlyasova 13; Rebs: İlyasova 13		Pts: Valančiūnas 14; Rebs: Valančiūnas 9 Asts: Kalnietis 6

O.A.C.A. Olympic Indoor Hall, Greece

28 August 2015
19:00 EEST

Report (media)

Netherlands	72–94	Lithuania
Scoring by quarter: 18–26, 16–24, 19–23, 19–21
Pts: Akerboom 15		Pts: Kuzminskas 18; Rebs: Valančiūnas 8 Asts: Janavičius 6

O.A.C.A. Olympic Indoor Hall, Greece

29 August 2015
19:00 EEST

Report (media)

Greece	67–62	Lithuania
Scoring by quarter: 16–15, 15–16, 18–15, 18–16
Pts: Printezis 14; Rebs: Antetokounmpo 7 Asts: Spanoulis 6		Pts: Mačiulis 15; Rebs: Valančiūnas 10; Asts: Kalnietis 6

O.A.C.A. Olympic Indoor Hall, Greece

== EuroBasket 2015 ==
=== Preliminary round ===
5 September 2015
21:30

Boxscore^{[usurped]}

Lithuania	69–68	Ukraine
Scoring by quarter: 19–12, 14–14, 17–19, 19–23
Pts: Jankūnas 22; Rebs: Valančiūnas 11; Asts: Kalnietis 7		Pts: Fesenko 19; Rebs: Fesenko 11; Asts: Randle 6

Arena Riga, Riga
Attendance: 8,846
Referees: Milivoje Jovčić (SRB), Eddie Viator (FRA), Sigmundur Herbertsson (ISL)

6 September 2015
18:30

Boxscore^{[usurped]}

Latvia	49–68	Lithuania
Scoring by quarter: 19–13, 9–16, 11–20, 10–19
Pts: Bērziņš, Freimanis 8 Rebs: Freimanis 9 Asts: Janičenoks 4		Pts: Valančiūnas 15; Rebs: Mačiulis 10; Asts: Kalnietis 6

Arena Riga, Riga
Attendance: 10,492
Referees: Ilija Belošević (SRB), Petar Obradović (BIH), Saverio Lanzarini (ITA)

7 September 2015
15:30

Boxscore^{[usurped]}

Lithuania	74–76	Belgium
Scoring by quarter: 20–12, 15–23, 19–22, 20–19
Pts: Valančiūnas 25; Rebs: Valančiūnas 12; Asts: Kalnietis 13		Pts: Lojeski 20; Rebs: Gillet 4 Asts: Lojeski, Van Rossom 5

Arena Riga, Riga
Attendance: 3,570
Referees: Emilio Pérez (ESP), Petar Obradović (BIH), Sigmundur Herbertsson (ISL)

9 September 2015
21:30

Boxscore^{[usurped]}

Estonia	62–64	Lithuania
Scoring by quarter: 15–20, 16–18, 20–11, 11–15
Pts: Talts 20; Rebs: Vene 7 Asts: S. Sokk 5		Pts: Mačiulis 15; Rebs: Mačiulis 10; Asts: Kalnietis 7

Arena Riga, Riga
Attendance: 6,985
Referees: Emin Moğulkoç (TUR), Marcin Kowalski (POL), Amit Balak (ISR)

10 September 2015
21:30

Boxscore^{[usurped]}

Czech Republic	81–85 (OT)	Lithuania
Scoring by quarter: 18–12, 19–15, 14–28, 18–14, Overtime: 12–16
Pts: Schilb 18; Rebs: Satoranský 9 Asts: Satoranský 15		Pts: Kuzminskas 18; Rebs: Valančiūnas 10; Asts: Kalnietis 4

Arena Riga, Riga
Attendance: 4,669
Referees: Emilio Pérez (ESP), Emin Moğulkoç (TUR), Petar Obradović (BIH)

=== Round of 16 ===
13 September 2015
21:00

Boxscore^{[usurped]}

Lithuania	85–81	Georgia
Scoring by quarter: 17–20, 22–20, 22–22, 24–19
Pts: Mačiulis 34; Rebs: Mačiulis 6 Asts: Kalnietis 7		Pts: Pachulia 23; Rebs: Pachulia, Sanikidze 7 Asts: Tsintsadze 5

Stade Pierre-Mauroy, Lille
Attendance: 16,953
Referees: Luigi Lamonica (ITA), Milivoje Jovčić (SRB), Jakub Zamojski (POL)

=== Quarterfinal ===
16 September 2015
21:00

Boxscore^{[usurped]}

Italy	85–95 (OT)	Lithuania
Scoring by quarter: 20–21, 16–16, 23–23, 20–19, Overtime: 6–16
Pts: Bargnani 21; Rebs: Gallinari 6 Asts: Cinciarini 5		Pts: Valančiūnas 26; Rebs: Valančiūnas 15; Asts: Kalnietis 11

Stade Pierre-Mauroy, Lille
Attendance: 13,173
Referees: Emilio Pérez (ESP), Sreten Radović (CRO), Miloš Koljenšić (MNE)

=== Semifinal ===
18 September 2015
21:00

Boxscore^{[usurped]}

Serbia	64–67	Lithuania
Scoring by quarter: 17–22, 17–13, 9–13, 21–19
Pts: Teodosić 16; Rebs: three players 4 Asts: Bogdanović, Teodosić 3		Pts: Valančiūnas 15; Rebs: Kuzminskas 9 Asts: Kalnietis 9

Stade Pierre-Mauroy, Lille
Attendance: 20,042
Referees: Emilio Pérez (ESP), Oļegs Latiševs (LAT), Emin Moğulkoç (TUR)

=== Final ===
20 September 2015
19:00

Boxscore^{[usurped]}

Spain	80–63	Lithuania
Scoring by quarter: 19–8, 22–25, 19–10, 20–20
Pts: Gasol 25; Rebs: Gasol 12; Asts: Rodríguez 6		Pts: Kalnietis, Seibutis 13; Rebs: Valančiūnas 9 Asts: Kalnietis 5

Stade Pierre-Mauroy, Lille
Attendance: 27,372
Referees: Luigi Lamonica (Italy), Ilija Belošević (Serbia), Borys Ryzhyk (Ukraine)

=== State awards ===
On September 22, 2015, the national team players, coaches and staff members were awarded with State awards and medals by Lithuania President Dalia Grybauskaitė. Although, many members were unable to receive new state awards because they were awarded in 2013 and the Lithuanian law requires a minimum of 3 years break before receiving a new one. Such members received presidential letters of thanks and gifts.

Award	Award title	Person	Position
	Order for Merits to Lithuania Grand Cross	Paulius Jankūnas	Player
	Order of the Lithuanian Grand Duke Gediminas Knight's Cross	Mindaugas Špokas	Team manager
	Order for Merits to Lithuania Knight's Cross	Deividas Gailius	Player
	Order for Merits to Lithuania Knight's Cross	Antanas Kavaliauskas	Player
	Order for Merits to Lithuania Knight's Cross	Lukas Lekavičius	Player
	Order for Merits to Lithuania Knight's Cross	Artūras Milaknis	Player
	Order for Merits to Lithuania Knight's Cross	Domantas Sabonis	Player
	Order for Merits to Lithuania Knight's Cross	Jonas Valančiūnas	Player
	Order for Merits to Lithuania Medal	Paulius Jacikas	Physiotherapist
	Order for Merits to Lithuania Medal	Petras Mikučionis	Physiotherapist
