= Eimantas Bendžius =

Lithuanian basketball player (born 1990)

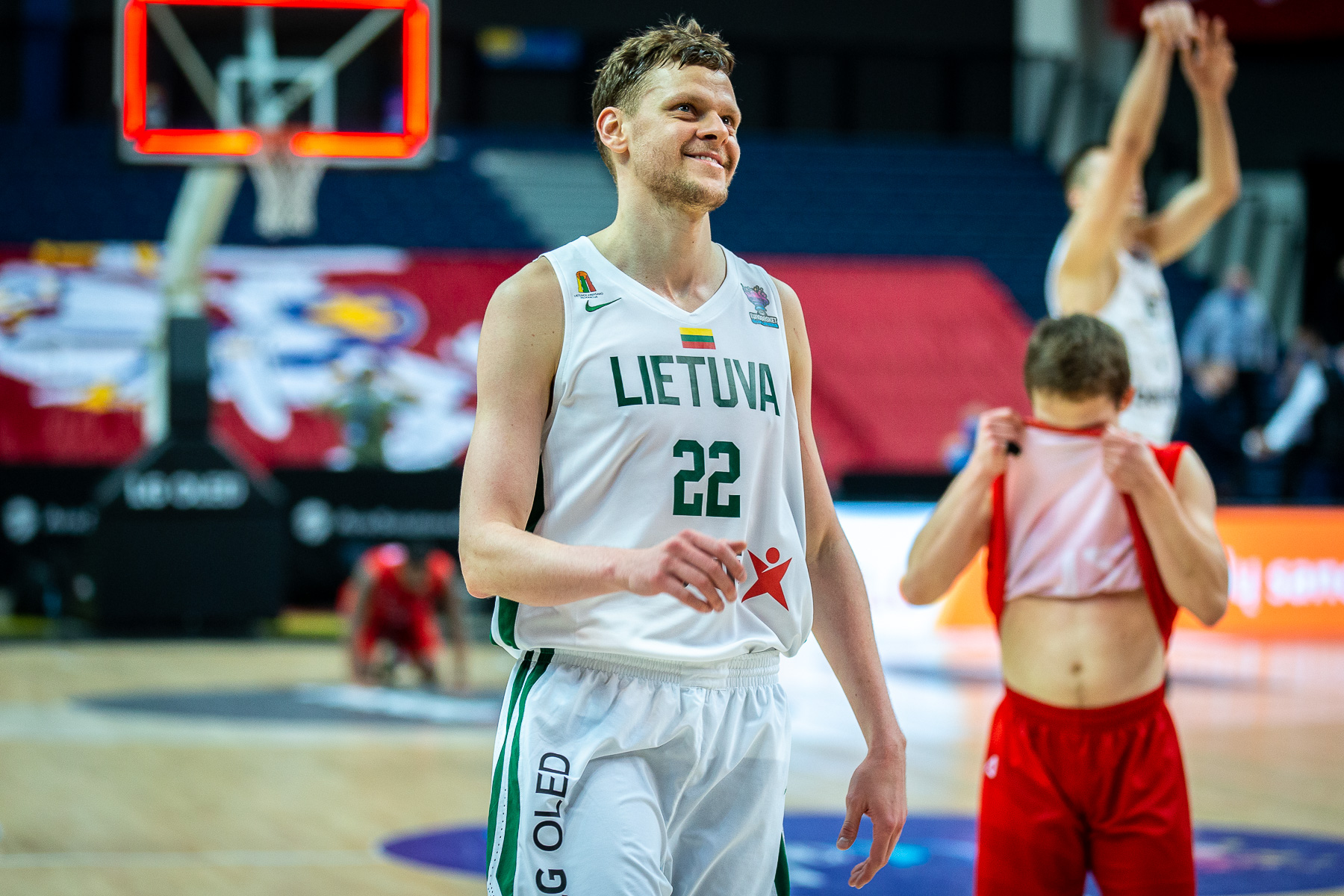
- Bendžius with Lithuania national team in 2021

No. 22 – APU Old Wild West Udine
- Position: Power forward
- League: LBA

Personal information
- Born: 23 April 1990 (age 36) Klaipėda, Lithuania
- Listed height: 2.07 m (6 ft 9 in)
- Listed weight: 102 kg (225 lb)

Career information
- NBA draft: 2012: undrafted
- Playing career: 2008–present

Career history
- 2008–2010: Perlas Vilnius
- 2010–2014: Lietuvos rytas Vilnius
- 2011–2012: →Pieno žvaigždės Pasvalys
- 2014–2015: Trefl Sopot
- 2015–2018: Obradoiro
- 2018–2020: Rytas Vilnius
- 2020–2025: Dinamo Sassari
- 2025–present: APU Udine

Career highlights
- King Mindaugas Cup winner (2019); LKL All-Star (2013)

Eimantas Bendžius (born 23 April 1990) is a Lithuanian professional basketball player for APU Udine of the Lega Basket Serie A (LBA). Standing at 2.07 m (6 ft 9 1/2 in), he plays as a power forward.

== Professional career ==
Bendžius started his career with Perlas Vilnius, playing in the NKL in 2008. During the 2009–10 season, he became one of the leaders of Perlas, a team that debuted in the LKL that season. On 2 June 2010, Bendžius joined Lietuvos rytas Vilnius.

Bendžius became one of the key players for Lietuvos rytas during the 2012–13 LKL season. In an important game against the rival Žalgiris Kaunas, Bendžius hit 6 out of 9 three-pointers to overcome Žalgiris. Because of this win, Lietuvos rytas secured a second place in the regular season and avoided meeting Žalgiris before the finals. Rytas went on to the LKL finals against Žalgiris - this time, Žalgiris beat Rytas.

In June 2015, Bendžius signed a two-year contract with the Spanish team Río Natura Monbús Obradoiro.

On 10 July 2018, he signed with Rytas Vilnius of the Lithuanian Basketball League.

On 7 July 2020, he signed with Dinamo Sassari of the Italian Lega Basket Serie A (LBA).

On June 25, 2025, he signed with APU Udine of the Lega Basket Serie A (LBA).

== National team career ==
Bendžius represented Lithuania at the 2009 FIBA Under-19 World Championship. In the game against Kazakhstan, Bendžius scored 21 points. He later participated at the 2013 Summer Universiade in Kazan, Russia, as part of the Lithuania students' basketball team.

Bendžius represented primary Lithuania men's national basketball team during the EuroBasket 2017 for the first time and averaged 2.5 points, 2.5 rebounds and 0.5 assists.
