= Lithuania at EuroBasket 2013 =

This page tracks the progress of the Lithuania national basketball team participating at the EuroBasket 2013.

== Main Squad ==
Lithuania men's national basketball team roster
Players
Coaches

| Pos. | No. | Name | Age – Date of birth | Height | Club | Ctr. |
|---|---|---|---|---|---|---|
| F/C | 4 | Donatas Motiejūnas | 22 – 20 September 1990 | 2.13 m (7 ft 0 in) | Houston Rockets | (United States) |
| PG | 5 | Mantas Kalnietis | 26 – 6 September 1986 | 1.96 m (6 ft 5 in) | PBC Lokomotiv Kuban | (Russia) |
| SF | 6 | Mindaugas Kuzminskas | 23 – 19 October 1989 | 2.06 m (6 ft 9 in) | Unicaja Malaga | (Spain) |
| C | 7 | Darjuš Lavrinovič | 33 – 1 November 1979 | 2.12 m (6 ft 11 in) | BC Budivelnyk | (Ukraine) |
| SF | 8 | Jonas Mačiulis | 28 – 10 February 1985 | 1.98 m (6 ft 6 in) | Panathinaikos B.C. | (Greece) |
| G | 9 | Tomas Delininkaitis | 31 – 11 June 1982 | 1.90 m (6 ft 3 in) | BK VEF Rīga | (Latvia) |
| SG | 10 | Renaldas Seibutis | 28 – 23 July 1985 | 1.98 m (6 ft 6 in) | BC Lietuvos rytas | (Lithuania) |
| PF | 11 | Linas Kleiza | 28 – 3 January 1985 | 2.03 m (6 ft 8 in) | Fenerbahçe Ülker | (Turkey) |
| F/C | 12 | Kšyštof Lavrinovič | 33 – 1 November 1979 | 2.10 m (6 ft 11 in) | BC Žalgiris | (Lithuania) |
| G/F | 13 | Martynas Pocius | 27 – 28 April 1986 | 1.96 m (6 ft 5 in) | BC Žalgiris | (Lithuania) |
| C | 14 | Jonas Valančiūnas | 21 – 6 May 1992 | 2.11 m (6 ft 11 in) | Toronto Raptors | (Canada) |
| C | 15 | Robertas Javtokas (C) | 33 – 20 March 1980 | 2.11 m (6 ft 11 in) | BC Žalgiris | (Lithuania) |

Head coach

- (Lithuania) Jonas Kazlauskas

Assistant coach(es)

- (Lithuania) Darius Maskoliūnas
- (Lithuania) Gintaras Krapikas

Legend

- Club – describes last
  club before the tournament
- Age – describes age
  September 4, 2013
- (C) – team captain

=== Depth chart ===
| Pos. | Starting 5 | Bench 1 | Reserve |
|---|---|---|---|
| C | Jonas Valančiūnas | Darjuš Lavrinovič | Robertas Javtokas |
| PF | Linas Kleiza | Donatas Motiejūnas | Kšyštof Lavrinovič |
| SF | Jonas Mačiulis | Mindaugas Kuzminskas |
| SG | Renaldas Seibutis | Martynas Pocius |
| PG | Mantas Kalnietis | Tomas Delininkaitis |

=== Candidates that did not make it to the final team ===
| # | Position | Player | Year of birth | Club | Reason | Date announced |
|---|---|---|---|---|---|---|
| 13 | Guard | Martynas Gecevičius | 1988 | (Lithuania) Lietuvos rytas | Coach decision | August 22 |
| 18 | Guard | Vytenis Čižauskas | 1992 | (Lithuania) BC Žalgiris | Coach decision | August 29 |
| 6 | Guard | Adas Juškevičius | 1989 | (Germany) Eisbären Bremerhaven | Coach decision | August 29 |

=== Missing players ===
| # | Position | Player | Year of birth | Club | Reason | Date announced |
|---|---|---|---|---|---|---|
| 13 | Guard | Šarūnas Jasikevičius | 1976 | (Europe) Free Agent | Needs time to recuperate after a season with FC Barcelona Bàsquet. | May 14 |
| 4 | Guard | Rimantas Kaukėnas | 1977 | (Europe) Free Agent | Retired from national team after 2012 Summer Olympics. | May 24 |
| 9 | Forward | Darius Songaila | 1978 | (Europe) Free Agent | Retired from national team after 2012 Summer Olympics. | May 24 |
| 10 | Forward | Simas Jasaitis | 1982 | (Russia) PBC Lokomotiv-Kuban | Decided to rest and to recover from injuries. | May 16 |
| 15 | Forward | Paulius Jankūnas | 1984 | (Lithuania) BC Žalgiris | A prolonged recovery to a shoulder injury. | July 11 |

=== Friendly matches ===
August 5, 2013
19:15

Report (media)

| Lithuania | 86–61 | Belgium |
Scoring by quarter: 21–15, 16–14, 29–16, 20–16
| Pts: Motiejūnas 19; Rebs: Javtokas 5 Asts: Juškevičius 3 | | Pts: Hervelle 14 |

Kėdainiai, Lithuania

August 6, 2013
19:15

Report (media)

| Lithuania | 66–53 | Belgium |
Scoring by quarter: 23–14, 16–13, 16–9, 11–17
| Pts: Kuzminskas 13; Rebs: Valančiūnas 11; Asts: Kalnietis 3 | | Pts: Tabu 12 |

Kaunas, Lithuania

August 12, 2013
19:15

Report (media)

| Lithuania | 97–69 | Sweden |
Scoring by quarter: 28–26, 34–11, 22–17, 13–15
| Pts: Kleiza 18; Rebs: Valančiūnas, Motiejūnas 8 Asts: Kalnietis 5 | | Pts: Grant 13 |

Panevėžys, Lithuania

August 14, 2013
19:15

Report (media)

| Lithuania | 95–64 | Sweden |
Scoring by quarter: 24–12, 34–15, 18–19, 19–18
| Pts: D.Lavrinovič 23; Rebs: Valančiūnas 8 Asts: Mačiulis 5 | | Pts: Gaddefors 14 |

Panevėžys, Lithuania
Attendance: 5000

August 17, 2013
21:00

Report (media)

| Macedonia (North Macedonia) | 50–62 | Lithuania |
Scoring by quarter: 13–14, 15–13, 16–14, 6–21
| Pts: Samardžiski, Stojanovski 11 | | Pts: Kleiza 14; Rebs: Valančiūnas 9 Asts: Seibutis 4 |

Skopje, Macedonia

August 21, 2013
19:20

Report (media)

| Lithuania | 78–76 | Finland |
Scoring by quarter: 19–24, 20–18, 25–11, 14–23
| Pts: Kleiza 17; Rebs: Valančiūnas 11; Asts: Kalnietis 6 | | Pts: Koponen 20 |

Vilnius, Lithuania

August 22, 2013
19:20

Report (media)

| Lithuania | 82–51 | Russia |
Scoring by quarter: 19–13, 15–10, 30–14, 18–14
| Pts: Valančiūnas 17; Asts: Seibutis, Delininkaitis 4 | | Pts: Ponkrashov 13 |

Vilnius, Lithuania

August 23, 2013
19:20

Report (media)

| Lithuania | 69–55 | Czech Republic |
Scoring by quarter: 14–10, 16–14, 16–13, 23–18
| Pts: Valančiūnas 23; Rebs: Valančiūnas 8 Asts: Kalnietis 5 | | Pts: Hruban 11 |

Vilnius, Lithuania

August 27, 2013
18:30

Report (media)

| Italy | 63–79 | Lithuania |
Scoring by quarter: 16–17, 16–21, 17–22, 14–19
| Pts: Belinelli, Aradori 15 | | Pts: Kleiza 18; Rebs: Valančiūnas 7 Asts: Kalnietis 6 |

Athens, Greece

August 28, 2013
19:00

Report (media)

| Greece | 80–62 | Lithuania |
Scoring by quarter: 20–13, 19–18, 21–20, 20–11
| Pts: Printezis 23 | | Pts: Kalnietis 13; Rebs: Kleiza 5 Asts: Kalnietis 6 |

Athens, Greece

August 29, 2013
18:30

Report (media)

| Bosnia & Herzegovina (Bosnia and Herzegovina) | 73–94 | Lithuania |
Scoring by quarter: 24–27, 16–25, 13–20, 20–22
| Pts: Wright 22 | | Pts: Kleiza, Valančiūnas, Kuzminskas 14; Rebs: Kuzminskas 8 Asts: Kalnietis 3 |

Athens, Greece

September 1, 2013
19:00

Report (media)

| Lithuania | 88–83 (OT) | (Georgia (country)) Georgia |
Scoring by quarter: 19–19, 24–12, 17–28, 17–18, Overtime: 11–6
| Pts: Kleiza 18; Rebs: Valančiūnas 10; Asts: Kalnietis 8 | | Pts: Sanikidze 27 |

Kaunas, Lithuania

=== EuroBasket 2013 matches ===
==== Preliminary round ====
| Team | Pld | W | L | PF | PA | PD | Pts | Tie |
|---|---|---|---|---|---|---|---|---|
| Serbia | 5 | 3 | 2 | 371 | 366 | +5 | 8 | 3–0 |
| Latvia | 5 | 3 | 2 | 365 | 360 | +5 | 8 | 1–2, 1–1, 1.021 |
| Lithuania | 5 | 3 | 2 | 347 | 337 | +10 | 8 | 1–2, 1–1, 1.015 |
| Bosnia and Herzegovina | 5 | 3 | 2 | 358 | 359 | −1 | 8 | 1–2, 1–1, 0.968 |
| Montenegro | 5 | 2 | 3 | 376 | 382 | −6 | 7 | |
| North Macedonia | 5 | 1 | 4 | 356 | 369 | −13 | 6 | |

All times are local (UTC+2)

4 September 2013
21:00

Boxscore

| Serbia | 63–56 | Lithuania |
Scoring by quarter: 20–10, 13–17, 18–14, 12–15
| Pts: Nen. Krstić 20; Rebs: Nen. Krstić 9 Asts: Nedović, Marković 3 | | Pts: Kalnietis 17; Rebs: D. Lavrinovič 6 Asts: Kalnietis 3 |

Podmežakla Hall, Jesenice
Attendance: 4,720
Referees: Juan Artega (ESP), Emin Moğulkoç (TUR), Sašo Petek (SLO)

5 September 2013
21:00

Boxscore

| Lithuania | 75–67 | North Macedonia |
Scoring by quarter: 20–15, 19–18, 18–17, 18–17
| Pts: Kalnietis 17; Rebs: Valančiūnas 7 Asts: Kalnietis 5 | | Pts: Ilievski 13; Rebs: Antić 8 Asts: Ilievski 4 |

Podmežakla Hall, Jesenice
Attendance: 4,020
Referees: Juan Arteaga (ESP), Elias Koromilas (GRE), Robert Vyklický (CZE)

6 September 2013
17:45

Boxscore

| Latvia | 59–67 | Lithuania |
Scoring by quarter: 17–22, 14–17, 14–13, 14–15
| Pts: Kuksiks 13; Rebs: Strēlnieks 6 Asts: Strēlnieks 3 | | Pts: Valančiūnas 11; Rebs: Valančiūnas 10; Asts: Kalnietis 6 |

Podmežakla Hall, Jesenice
Attendance: 3,000
Referees: Srđan Dozai (CRO), Robert Vyklický (CZE), Tomasz Trawicki (POL)

8 September 2013
21:00

Boxscore

| Lithuania | 77–70 (OT) | Montenegro |
Scoring by quarter: 19–19, 13–15, 19–13, 12–16, Overtime: 14–7
| Pts: K. Lavrinovič 24; Rebs: Valančiūnas 10; Asts: Kalnietis 7 | | Pts: Rice 19; Rebs: Dubljević 6 Asts: Bjelica 3 |

Podmežakla Hall, Jesenice
Attendance: 3,000
Referees: Juan Artega (ESP), Srđan Dozai (CRO), Anton Makhlin (RUS)

9 September 2013
17:45

Boxscore

| Lithuania | 72–78 | Bosnia and Herzegovina |
Scoring by quarter: 18–18, 12–13, 22–26, 20–21
| Pts: Kleiza 20; Rebs: Kleiza 10; Asts: Kalnietis 6 | | Pts: Teletović 31; Rebs: Teletović 7 Asts: Gordić 5 |

Podmežakla Hall, Jesenice
Attendance: 3,170
Referees: Elias Koromilas (GRE), Tomasz Trawicki (POL), Anton Makhlin (RUS)

==== Second round ====
| Team | Pld | W | L | PF | PA | PD | Pts | Tie |
|---|---|---|---|---|---|---|---|---|
| Serbia | 5 | 4 | 1 | 371 | 343 | +28 | 9 | 1–0 |
| Lithuania | 5 | 4 | 1 | 355 | 314 | +41 | 9 | 0–1 |
| France | 5 | 3 | 2 | 388 | 380 | +8 | 8 | |
| Ukraine | 5 | 2 | 3 | 325 | 364 | −39 | 7 | |
| Belgium | 5 | 1 | 4 | 318 | 358 | −40 | 6 | 1–0 |
| Latvia | 5 | 1 | 4 | 362 | 360 | +2 | 6 | 0–1 |

All times are local (UTC+2)

11 September 2013
21:00

Boxscore

| Lithuania | 76–62 | France |
Scoring by quarter: 16–10, 16–17, 19–15, 25–20
| Pts: Seibutis 15; Rebs: Kleiza 7 Asts: Kalnietis 7 | | Pts: de Colo 12; Rebs: Batum, Ajinça 6 Asts: Diaw 6 |

Arena Stožice, Ljubljana
Attendance: 3,880
Referees: Sreten Radović (CRO), Guerrino Cerebuch (ITA), Damir Javor (SLO)

13 September 2013
14:30

Boxscore

| Lithuania | 86–67 | Belgium |
Scoring by quarter: 18–12, 26–9, 25–14, 17–32
| Pts: Motiejūnas 13; Rebs: Valančiūnas 10; Asts: Kalnietis 6 | | Pts: Tabu 15; Rebs: Hervelle 8 Asts: Moors 5 |

Arena Stožice, Ljubljana
Attendance: 2,980
Referees: Luigi Lamonica (ITA), Srđan Dozai (CRO), Aleksandar Milojević (MKD)

15 September 2013
17:45

Boxscore

| Ukraine | 63–70 | Lithuania |
Scoring by quarter: 13–18, 17–14, 16–16, 17–22
| Pts: Gladyr 18; Rebs: Kravtsov 9 Asts: Jeter 8 | | Pts: Kleiza 15; Rebs: Kuzminskas, Mačiulis 6 Asts: Kalnietis, Seibutis 4 |

Arena Stožice, Ljubljana
Attendance: 4,400
Referees: Juan Arteaga (ESP), Srđan Dozai (CRO), Elias Koromilas (GRE)

==== Knockout stage ====
Quarterfinal

19 September 2013
21:00

Boxscore

| Lithuania | 81–77 | Italy |
Scoring by quarter: 22–15, 18–24, 17–19, 24–19
| Pts: Seibutis, Kalnietis 17; Rebs: Kalnietis 7 Asts: Mačiulis, Kalnietis 5 | | Pts: Belinelli 22; Rebs: Cusin 8 Asts: Cinciarini 3 |

Arena Stožice, Ljubljana
Attendance: 8,210
Referees: Ilija Belošević (SRB), Vicente Bulto (ESP), Damir Javor (SLO)

Semifinal

20 September 2013
17:45

Boscore

| Lithuania | 77–62 | Croatia |
Scoring by quarter: 24–19, 16–18, 21–8, 16–17
| Pts: Mačiulis 23; Rebs: Kleiza 11; Asts: Kalnietis, Seibutis 4 | | Pts: Bogdanović 15; Rebs: Ukić 7 Asts: Ukić 5 |

Arena Stožice, Ljubljana
Attendance: 9,180
Referees: Luigi Lamonica (ITA), Robert Lottermoser (GER), Christos Christodoulou (GRE)

Final

22 September 2013
21:00

Boxscore

| France | 80–66 | Lithuania |
Scoring by quarter: 19–22, 31–12, 18–16, 12–16
| Pts: Batum 17; Rebs: Ajinça 10; Asts: Diaw 4 | | Pts: Kleiza 20; Rebs: Mačiulis 6 Asts: three players 2 |

Arena Stožice, Ljubljana
Attendance: 10000
Referees: Luigi Lamonica (ITA), Juan Arteaga (ESP), Ilija Belosevic (SRB)

=== Orders, decorations, and medals ===
National team players, coaches and staff members were awarded with State orders, decorations and medals by Lithuania President Dalia Grybauskaitė.

| Award | Award title | Person | Position |
|---|---|---|---|
| | Order for Merits to Lithuania Grand Cross | Jonas Kazlauskas | Head coach |
| | Order of the Lithuanian Grand Duke Gediminas Commander's Grand Cross | Gintaras Krapikas | Coach |
| | Order for Merits to Lithuania Grand Commander Cross | Darius Maskoliūnas | Coach |
| | Order for Merits to Lithuania Grand Commander Cross | Juozas Petkevičius | Technical manager |
| | Order for Merits to Lithuania Grand Commander Cross | Linas Kleiza | Player |
| | Order for Merits to Lithuania Grand Commander Cross | Robertas Javtokas | Player |
| | Order for Merits to Lithuania Grand Commander Cross | Jonas Mačiulis | Player |
| | Order for Merits to Lithuania Officer's Cross | Tomas Delininkaitis | Player |
| | Order for Merits to Lithuania Officer's Cross | Mantas Kalnietis | Player |
| | Order for Merits to Lithuania Officer's Cross | Martynas Pocius | Player |
| | Order for Merits to Lithuania Officer's Cross | Renaldas Seibutis | Player |
| | Order for Merits to Lithuania Knight's Cross | Mindaugas Kuzminskas | Player |
| | Order for Merits to Lithuania Knight's Cross | Donatas Motiejūnas | Player |
| | Order for Merits to Lithuania Knight's Cross | Aidas Buzelis | Masseur |
| | Order for Merits to Lithuania Knight's Cross | Aleksejus Peletskij | Masseur |
| | Order for Merits to Lithuania Knight's Cross | Rimtautas Gudas | Doctor |
| | Order for Merits to Lithuania Knight's Cross | Vytenis Trumpickas | Doctor |
| | Order for Merits to Lithuania Medal | Jonas Valančiūnas^{‡} | Player |
| | Order for Merits to Lithuania Medal | Sigitas Kavaliauskas | Physical training coach |
| | Order for Merits to Lithuania Medal | Linas Kunigėlis | Spokesman |
| | Order for Merits to Lithuania Medal | Benas Matkevičius | Coach-scout |
| | Order for Merits to Lithuania Medal | Žydrūnas Vilenčikas | Administrator |

== Student Squad ==
The student roster is composed of players under the age of 25 who stand out from other young Lithuanian basketball players. Some of the players are from the so–called "golden generation" – players born in 1992 who won 5 gold medals in 5 youth competitions. Players from this squad may also be chosen to represent the senior national team in the case of injuries. The team competed in the World's 27th Universiade in Kazan from July 6 until July 17 and finished in 5th place. Vytenis Čižauskas and Adas Juškevičius were chosen as candidates for the main squad.

Lithuanian students' basketball team roster
Players
Coaches

| Pos. | No. | Name | Age – Date of birth | Height | Club | Ctr. |
|---|---|---|---|---|---|---|
| PG | 4 | Šarūnas Vasiliauskas | 24 – 27 March 1989 | 1.88 m (6 ft 2 in) | BC Pieno žvaigždės | (Lithuania) |
| PG | 5 | Vytenis Čižauskas | 20 – 16 September 1992 | 1.88 m (6 ft 2 in) | CB Valladolid | (Spain) |
| PG | 6 | Augustas Pečiukevičius | 21 – 2 December 1991 | 1.92 m (6 ft 4 in) | KK Pärnu | (Estonia) |
| F | 7 | Eimantas Bendžius | 23 – 23 April 1990 | 2.03 m (6 ft 8 in) | BC Lietuvos rytas | (Lithuania) |
| G | 8 | Adas Juškevičius | 25 – 3 January 1988 | 1.94 m (6 ft 4 in) | BC Žalgiris | (Lithuania) |
| G/F | 9 | Edgaras Ulanovas | 21 – 7 January 1992 | 1.97 m (6 ft 6 in) | BC Lietkabelis | (Lithuania) |
| G/F | 10 | Vytenis Lipkevičius | 24 – 19 May 1989 | 1.98 m (6 ft 6 in) | BC Žalgiris | (Lithuania) |
| C | 11 | Mindaugas Kupšas | 22 – 9 April 1991 | 2.15 m (7 ft 1 in) | BC Lietkabelis | (Lithuania) |
| F | 12 | Gediminas Orelikas | 23 – 14 May 1990 | 2.00 m (6 ft 7 in) | BC Lietuvos rytas | (Lithuania) |
| SF | 13 | Simas Buterlevičius | 24 – 18 April 1989 | 2.00 m (6 ft 7 in) | BC Lietuvos rytas | (Lithuania) |
| C | 14 | Vaidas Čepukaitis | 24 – 16 May 1989 | 2.07 m (6 ft 9 in) | BC Pieno žvaigždės | (Lithuania) |
| F/C | 15 | Adomas Drungilas | 22 – 6 October 1990 | 2.05 m (6 ft 9 in) | BC Lietkabelis | (Lithuania) |

Head coach

- (Lithuania) Dainius Adomaitis

Assistant coach(es)

- (Lithuania) Arvydas Gronskis
- (Lithuania) Arūnas Juknevičius

Legend

- (C) Team captain
- Club field describes current pro club
- Age field is age on September 4, 2013

=== Depth chart ===
| Pos. | Starting 5 | Bench 1 | Reserve |
|---|---|---|---|
| C | Mindaugas Kupšas | Vaidas Čepukaitis |
| PF | Gediminas Orelikas | Eimantas Bendžius | Adomas Drungilas |
| SF | Vytenis Lipkevičius | Simas Buterlevičius |
| SG | Adas Juškevičius | Edgaras Ulanovas |
| PG | Vytenis Čižauskas | Šarūnas Vasiliauskas | Augustas Pečiukevičius |

=== Friendly matches ===
June 16, 2013
19:00

| Lithuania | 110–71 | Russia U–20 |
Scoring by quarter: 27–22, 33–16, 27–16, 23–17

Druskininkai

June 21, 2013
18:00

| Lithuania | 65–62 | Lithuania U–20 |
Scoring by quarter: 20–12, 16–19, 14–12, 15–19

Kaunas

June 23, 2013
10:00

| Lithuania | 85–44 | (Czech Republic) Czech U–20 |
Scoring by quarter: 20–7, 21–12, 25–14, 19–11

Kaunas

June 28, 2013
21:30

| Lithuania | 84–83 | Spain Regional |
Scoring by quarter: 20–19, 15–27, 19–17, 30–20

Spain

June 29, 2013
21:30

| Lithuania | 86–79 | Spain Regional |
Scoring by quarter: 18–18, 26–20, 24–21, 17–19

Spain

July 2, 2013
17:00

| Lithuania | 98–46 | Estonia Student |
Scoring by quarter: 19–16, 25–8, 28–10, 26–12

Vilnius

=== Universiade matches ===
July 7, 2013
18:00

Report

| Lithuania | 94–71 | Norway |
Scoring by quarter: 23–15, 33–23, 23–18, 15–15
| Pts: S. Buterlevičius 16; Rebs: V. Čepukaitis 10; Asts: A. Juškevičius 5 | | Pts: A. Stien 18; Rebs: A. Bolin 3 Asts: S. Mjøs 6 |

Miras Sports Complex, Kazan

July 8, 2013
18:00

Report

| Lithuania | 116–51 | Chile |
Scoring by quarter: 34–12, 29–8, 37–18, 16–13
| Pts: M. Kupšas 20; Rebs: A. Drungilas 7 Asts: V. Čižauskas 5 | | Pts: T. Álvarez 13; Rebs: R. Controneo 5 Asts: C. Bustamante 3 |

Miras Sports Complex, Kazan

July 10, 2013
18:00

Report

| Lithuania | 129–52 | China |
Scoring by quarter: 34–20, 34–6, 23–16, 38–10
| Pts: G. Orelik 22; Rebs: M. Kupšas 10; Asts: 3 players 7 | | Pts: Z. Liu 16; Rebs: 3 players 4 Asts: J. Cui 2 |

Miras Sports Complex, Kazan

July 11, 2013
12:30

Report

| Lithuania | 77–69 | Brazil |
Scoring by quarter: 22–16, 19–14, 16–18, 20–21
| Pts: Š. Vasiliauskas 17; Rebs: V. Lipkevičius 8 Asts: 2 players 4 | | Pts: C. Felício 20; Rebs: C. Felício 12; Asts: G. Chaia 5 |

Miras Sports Complex, Kazan

July 12, 2013
10:00

Report

| Lithuania | 70–51 | Finland |
Scoring by quarter: 18–7, 19–14, 17–7, 16–23
| Pts: G. Orelik 15; Rebs: V. Čepukaitis 8 Asts: V. Lipkevičius 3 | | Pts: A. Nikkarinen 10; Rebs: L. Toivonen 6 Asts: 2 players 2 |

Miras Sports Complex, Kazan

July 14, 2013
18:30

Quarterfinal (Report)

| Lithuania | 55–60 | Australia |
Scoring by quarter: 20–11, 8–15, 17–14, 10–20
| Pts: 2 players 16; Rebs: 2 players 8 Asts: V. Čižauskas 2 | | Pts: R. Broekhoff 14; Rebs: M. Young 7 Asts: 4 players 2 |

Miras Sports Complex, Kazan

July 15, 2013
20:30

Classification (Report)

| Lithuania | 82–61 | Estonia |
Scoring by quarter: 20–13, 17–15, 27–20, 18–13
| Pts: A. Juškevičius 14; Rebs: G. Orelik 5 Asts: V. Čižauskas 4 | | Pts: T. Raadik 16; Rebs: 2 players 5 Asts: K. Keres 3 |

Miras Sports Complex, Kazan

July 16, 2013
13:00

5th Place (Report)

| Lithuania | 87–50 | Romania |
Scoring by quarter: 18–7, 25–15, 20–12, 24–16
| Pts: A. Drungilas 16; Rebs: E. Bendžius 7 Asts: Š. Vasiliauskas 5 | | Pts: B. Țîbîrnă 16; Rebs: R. Török 7 Asts: A. Gutoaia 3 |

Basket Hall, Kazan
