= 2022–23 EuroLeague regular season =

European basketball competition

The 2022–23 EuroLeague Regular Season is the premier European competition for men's basketball clubs. A total of 18 teams compete in the regular season to decide the eight places of the playoffs.

== Format ==
In the regular season, teams played against each other home-and-away in a round-robin format. The eight first qualified teams advanced to the playoffs, while the last ten qualified teams were eliminated. The match days were from 6 October 2022 to 14 April 2023.

=== Tiebreakers ===
When all teams have played each other twice:

1. Best record in head-to-head games between all tied teams.
2. Higher cumulative score difference in head-to-head games between all tied teams.
3. Higher cumulative score difference for the entire regular season.
4. Higher total of points scored for the entire regular season.
5. Higher sum of quotients of points in favor and points against of each match played in the regular season.

If a tiebreaker does not resolve a tie completely, a new tiebreak process is initiated with only those teams that remain tied. All points scored in extra periods will not be counted in the standings, nor for any tie-break situation.

== League table ==
Pos	Team	Pld	W	L	PF	PA	PD	Qualification
1	(Hellenic Basketball Federation) Olympiacos	34	24	10	2857	2578	+279	Qualification to playoffs
2	(Spanish Basketball Federation) Barcelona	34	23	11	2723	2580	+143	Qualification to playoffs
3	(Spanish Basketball Federation) Real Madrid	34	23	11	2877	2666	+211	Qualification to playoffs
4	(French Federation of Basketball) AS Monaco	34	21	13	2802	2749	+53	Qualification to playoffs
5	(Israeli Basketball Association) Maccabi Playtika Tel Aviv	34	20	14	2827	2743	+84	Qualification to playoffs
6	(Basketball Federation of Serbia) Partizan Mozzart Bet	34	20	14	2877	2781	+96	Qualification to playoffs
7	(Lithuanian Basketball Federation) Žalgiris	34	19	15	2591	2626	−35	Qualification to playoffs
8	(Turkish Basketball Federation) Fenerbahçe Beko	34	19	15	2823	2745	+78	Qualification to playoffs
9	(Spanish Basketball Federation) Cazoo Baskonia	34	18	16	2919	2836	+83	
10	(Basketball Federation of Serbia) Crvena zvezda Meridianbet	34	17	17	2591	2613	−22	
11	(Turkish Basketball Federation) Anadolu Efes	34	17	17	2800	2736	+64	
12	(Italian Basketball Federation) EA7 Emporio Armani Milan	34	15	19	2534	2611	−77	
13	(Spanish Basketball Federation) Valencia Basket	34	15	19	2756	2891	−135	
14	(Italian Basketball Federation) Virtus Segafredo Bologna	34	14	20	2644	2801	−157	
15	(German Basketball Federation) Bayern Munich	34	11	23	2605	2739	−134	
16	(German Basketball Federation) ALBA Berlin	34	11	23	2704	2851	−147	
17	(Hellenic Basketball Federation) Panathinaikos (Note: Panathinaikos were docked two wins as a punishment by Euroleague Basketball for breaching Financial Fair Play regulations.)	32	9	23	2649	2773	−124	
18	(French Federation of Basketball) LDLC ASVEL	34	8	26	2527	2787	−260	

Source: EuroLeague
Rules for classification: All points scored in extra period(s) were not counted in the standings, nor for any tie-break situation.

== Positions by round ==
The table lists the positions of teams after completion of each round. In order to preserve chronological evolvements, any postponed matches are not included in the round at which they were originally scheduled, but added to the full round they were played immediately afterwards.

Leader and qualification to playoffs	Qualification to playoffs

Team ╲ Round	1	2	3	4	5	6	7	8	9	10	11	12	13	14	15	16	17	18	19	20	21	22	23	24	25	26	27	28	29	30	31	32	33	34
Olympiacos	6	2	4	2	3	4	2	2	2	2	5	3	2	4	6	4	1	4	2	1	1	1	1	1	1	2	1	1	1	1	1	1	1	1
Barcelona	14	11	7	10	6	5	3	5	4	4	3	5	4	2	4	2	4	2	4	4	4	3	3	3	3	3	3	3	3	3	3	2	3	2
Real Madrid	8	8	10	9	10	9	5	4	3	3	2	4	3	5	2	6	2	1	1	2	2	2	2	2	2	1	2	2	2	2	2	3	2	3
AS Monaco	1	3	6	7	4	2	4	3	5	5	4	2	5	3	5	3	5	3	5	6	5	4	5	4	5	5	4	4	4	4	4	4	4	4
Maccabi Playtika Tel Aviv	9	12	8	6	2	6	9	10	8	9	9	8	8	8	8	7	9	8	9	8	8	11	8	10	8	9	8	8	6	6	6	5	7	5
Partizan Mozzart Bet	17	18	16	12	9	7	11	8	11	11	13	13	15	15	12	11	11	11	11	12	11	10	7	6	6	6	6	7	7	7	7	7	6	6
Žalgiris	10	14	11	11	13	12	8	6	7	6	8	10	11	9	9	9	8	7	7	5	7	7	10	9	10	11	9	9	9	9	9	9	9	7
Fenerbahçe Beko	4	1	1	1	1	1	1	1	1	1	1	1	1	1	1	5	6	5	3	3	3	5	4	5	4	4	5	5	5	5	5	6	5	8
Cazoo Baskonia	5	5	3	4	7	3	6	7	6	8	7	7	6	6	3	1	3	6	6	7	6	6	6	7	7	7	7	6	8	8	8	8	8	9
Crvena zvezda Meridianbet	16	16	18	18	16	18	18	17	17	14	12	11	9	10	10	10	10	10	10	10	12	13	13	13	13	13	13	14	14	14	12	11	10	10
Anadolu Efes	3	6	9	8	11	14	15	12	9	7	6	6	7	7	7	8	7	9	8	9	10	9	11	11	11	8	10	10	11	10	10	10	11	11
EA7 Emporio Armani Milan	7	7	5	5	8	11	12	14	16	18	18	18	18	17	17	14	15	17	17	18	18	17	16	15	14	14	14	13	13	11	11	12	12	12
Valencia Basket	13	15	12	13	12	10	7	11	12	12	11	12	12	12	11	12	13	12	12	11	9	8	9	8	9	10	11	12	10	12	13	13	13	13
Virtus Segafredo Bologna	18	13	13	15	15	15	14	9	10	10	14	16	14	13	14	13	12	13	13	13	14	12	12	12	12	12	12	11	12	13	14	14	14	14
Bayern Munich	15	17	17	17	18	16	16	16	15	16	15	14	16	16	16	17	14	14	14	14	13	14	14	14	15	15	15	15	15	15	15	15	15	15
ALBA Berlin	2	4	2	3	5	8	10	13	13	15	16	17	17	18	18	18	18	15	16	17	17	18	18	18	18	18	18	18	17	17	17	17	17	16
Panathinaikos	11	9	15	14	17	17	17	18	18	13	10	9	10	11	13	15	16	16	15	16	15	15	15	16	16	16	16	16	16	16	16	16	16	17
LDLC ASVEL	12	10	14	16	14	13	13	15	14	17	17	15	13	14	15	16	17	18	18	15	16	16	17	17	17	17	17	17	18	18	18	18	18	18

Source: EuroLeague

== Results by round ==
The table lists the results of teams in each round.

Win	Loss

Team ╲ Round	1	2	3	4	5	6	7	8	9	10	11	12	13	14	15	16	17	18	19	20	21	22	23	24	25	26	27	28	29	30	31	32	33	34
ALBA Berlin	W	W	W	L	L	L	L	L	L	L	L	L	L	L	L	W	W	W	L	L	L	L	L	L	W	L	L	L	W	W	L	L	W	W
Anadolu Efes	W	L	L	W	L	L	L	W	W	W	W	W	L	L	W	L	W	L	W	L	L	W	L	W	W	W	L	L	L	L	W	W	L	W
Barcelona	L	W	W	L	W	W	W	L	W	W	W	L	W	W	L	W	L	W	L	W	L	W	W	W	W	W	L	L	W	W	W	W	L	W
Bayern Munich	L	L	L	L	L	W	W	L	W	L	W	L	L	W	L	L	W	W	L	W	W	L	L	L	L	W	W	L	L	L	L	L	L	L
Cazoo Baskonia	W	W	W	L	L	W	L	L	W	L	W	W	W	W	W	W	L	L	L	L	W	L	W	L	L	W	W	L	L	L	W	W	W	L
Crvena zvezda Meridianbet	L	L	L	L	W	L	L	W	W	W	W	W	W	L	W	L	W	L	W	L	L	L	L	W	L	L	W	L	L	W	W	W	W	W
EA7 Emporio Armani Milan	W	L	W	W	L	L	L	L	L	L	L	L	L	W	W	W	L	L	L	L	L	W	W	W	W	W	W	W	L	W	L	L	W	L
Fenerbahçe Beko	W	W	W	W	W	L	W	W	W	W	L	W	L	L	L	L	L	W	W	W	L	L	W	L	W	W	L	W	L	W	L	L	W	L
LDLC ASVEL	L	W	L	L	W	W	L	L	L	L	L	W	W	W	L	L	L	L	L	W	W	L	L	L	L	L	L	L	L	L	L	L	L	L
Maccabi Playtika Tel Aviv	W	L	W	W	W	L	L	L	W	L	L	W	W	L	W	W	L	W	L	W	L	L	W	L	W	L	W	W	W	W	W	W	L	W
AS Monaco	W	W	L	W	W	W	L	W	L	W	W	W	L	W	L	W	L	W	L	L	W	W	L	W	L	W	W	W	W	W	L	W	L	L
Olympiacos	W	W	W	W	L	L	W	W	L	W	L	W	W	L	L	W	W	L	W	W	W	W	W	W	W	L	W	W	W	L	W	W	L	W
Panathinaikos	L	W	L	L	L	L	W	L	W	W	W	W	L	L	L	L	L	L	W	L	W	L	L	L	L	L	L	W	W	L	W	L	L	L
Partizan Mozzart Bet	L	L	L	W	W	W	L	W	L	L	L	L	L	W	W	W	W	L	W	L	W	W	W	W	L	W	W	L	W	W	L	W	W	W
Real Madrid	W	L	L	W	L	W	W	W	W	W	W	L	W	L	W	L	W	W	W	L	W	W	W	L	W	W	L	W	W	W	W	L	W	L
Valencia Basket	L	L	W	L	W	W	W	L	L	L	W	L	W	L	W	L	L	W	W	W	W	W	L	W	L	L	L	L	W	L	L	L	W	L
Virtus Segafredo Bologna	L	W	L	L	W	L	W	W	L	L	L	L	W	W	L	W	W	L	L	W	L	W	W	L	W	L	L	W	L	L	L	L	L	W
Žalgiris	L	L	W	W	L	W	W	W	L	W	L	L	L	W	W	L	W	W	W	W	L	L	L	W	L	L	W	W	L	L	W	W	W	W

Source: EuroLeague

== Matches ==
=== Round 1 ===
6 October 2022	LDLC ASVEL (French Federation of Basketball)	62–69	(Italian Basketball Federation) EA7 Emporio Armani Milan	Villeurbanne
20:00 (CEST)	Scoring by quarter: 23–14, 21–27, 10–15, 8–13
	Pts: de Colo 18; Rebs: Noua 8 Asts: de Colo 4 PIR: de Colo 19	Boxscore	Pts: Baron 18; Rebs: Voigtmann 8 Asts: Baron 5 PIR: Baron 22	Arena: Astroballe; Attendance: 4,841; Referees: Robert Lottermoser, Emilio Pérez, Gentian Cici

6 October 2022	Panathinaikos (Hellenic Basketball Federation)	68–71	(Spanish Basketball Federation) Real Madrid	Marousi
20:00 (CEST)	Scoring by quarter: 22–23, 15–15, 14–16, 17–17
	Pts: Williams 15; Rebs: Bochoridis, Ponitka 6 Asts: Ponitka 4 PIR: Williams 17	Boxscore	Pts: Tavares 14; Rebs: Deck 13; Asts: Llull 5 PIR: Tavares 22	Arena: OAKA Altion; Attendance: 8,387; Referees: Matej Boltauzer, Carmelo Paternicò, Emin Moğulkoç

6 October 2022	Maccabi Playtika Tel Aviv (Israeli Basketball Association)	84–83	(Lithuanian Basketball Federation) Žalgiris	Tel Aviv
20:05 (CEST)	Scoring by quarter: 30–27, 16–21, 25–17, 13–18
	Pts: Colson 16; Rebs: Colson 6 Asts: Brown 11; PIR: Colson 29	Boxscore	Pts: Evans 17; Rebs: Šmits, Hayes 9 Asts: three players 2 PIR: Hayes 21	Arena: Menora Mivtachim Arena; Attendance: 10,455; Referees: Saša Pukl, Luka Kardum, Maxime Boubert

6 October 2022	Valencia Basket (Spanish Basketball Federation)	71–81	(Spanish Basketball Federation) Cazoo Baskonia	Valencia
20:30 (CEST)	Scoring by quarter: 21–19, 12–20, 23–20, 15–22
	Pts: Rivero 14; Rebs: Puerto, Rivero 6 Asts: three players 2 PIR: Rivero 17	Boxscore	Pts: Kotsar 21; Rebs: Kotsar 9 Asts: Thompson 11; PIR: Kotsar 31	Arena: La Fonteta; Attendance: 6,426; Referees: Borys Ryzhyk, Ilija Belošević, Elias Koromilas

6 October 2022	Bayern Munich (German Basketball Federation)	62–74	(Turkish Basketball Federation) Fenerbahçe Beko	Munich
20:30 (CEST)	Scoring by quarter: 19–21, 15–19, 12–19, 16–15
	Pts: Hunter 18; Rebs: Hunter 8 Asts: Weiler-Babb 5 PIR: Hunter 27	Boxscore	Pts: Jekiri 15; Rebs: Motley 7 Asts: Gudurić, Calathes 5 PIR: Jekiri 22	Arena: Audi Dome; Attendance: 5,242; Referees: Juan Carlos García, Tomislav Hordov, Uroš Nikolić

7 October 2022	Anadolu Efes (Turkish Basketball Federation)	72–59	(Basketball Federation of Serbia) Crvena zvezda mts	Istanbul
19:30 (CEST)	Scoring by quarter: 17–14, 18–20, 21–16, 16–9
	Pts: Clyburn 19; Rebs: Žižić 5 Asts: Micić 6 PIR: Clyburn 19	Boxscore	Pts: Bentil 13; Rebs: Lazić, Petrušev 6 Asts: Mitrović, Ivanović 5 PIR: Bentil 15	Arena: Sinan Erdem Dome; Attendance: 14,721; Referees: Benjamín Jiménez, Tomasz Trawicki, Artūras Šukys

7 October 2022	ALBA Berlin (German Basketball Federation)	100–84	(Basketball Federation of Serbia) Partizan Mozzart Bet	Berlin
20:00 (CEST)	Scoring by quarter: 33–18, 28–25, 16–18, 23–23
	Pts: Blatt 16; Rebs: Olinde 10; Asts: Sikma 7 PIR: Sikma 27	Boxscore	Pts: Exum 22; Rebs: Lessort, Punter 6 Asts: Exum 4 PIR: Exum 22	Arena: Mercedes-Benz Arena; Attendance: 10,984; Referees: Oļegs Latiševs, Rain Peerandi, Guido Giovanetti

7 October 2022	Virtus Segafredo Bologna (Italian Basketball Federation)	66–83	(French Federation of Basketball) AS Monaco	Bologna
20:30 (CEST)	Scoring by quarter: 18–18, 16–22, 11–23, 21–20
	Pts: Lundberg 14; Rebs: Bako 7 Asts: Cordinier 3 PIR: Lundberg 18	Boxscore	Pts: James 26; Rebs: Moerman 7 Asts: James 6 PIR: James 30	Arena: PalaDozza; Attendance: 3,648; Referees: Daniel Hierrezuelo, Jakub Zamojski, Amit Balak

7 October 2022	Barcelona (Spanish Basketball Federation)	70–80	(Hellenic Basketball Federation) Olympiacos	Barcelona
20:30 (CEST)	Scoring by quarter: 16–13, 12–21, 21–23, 21–23
	Pts: Laprovíttola 16; Rebs: Veselý 6 Asts: Satoranský 4 PIR: Higgins 13	Boxscore	Pts: Vezenkov 20; Rebs: Vezenkov, Bolomboy 7 Asts: Sloukas 9 PIR: Bolomboy 20	Arena: Palau Blaugrana; Attendance: 5,730; Referees: Sreten Radović, Damir Javor, Mehdi Difallah

=== Round 2 ===
13 October 2022	Crvena zvezda mts (Basketball Federation of Serbia)	75–77	(Hellenic Basketball Federation) Panathinaikos	Belgrade
19:00 (CEST)	Scoring by quarter: 24–18, 14–24, 18–15, 19–20
	Pts: Bentil 18; Rebs: Mitrović, Bentil 6 Asts: three players 3 PIR: Bentil 17	Boxscore	Pts: Grigonis 17; Rebs: Papagiannis 7 Asts: Grigonis, Ponitka 3 PIR: Grigonis 21	Arena: Aleksandar Nikolić Hall; Attendance: 7,293; Referees: Miguel Ángel Pérez, Michele Rossi, Jurgis Laurinavičius

13 October 2022	AS Monaco (French Federation of Basketball)	95–92(OT)	(Turkish Basketball Federation) Anadolu Efes	Fontvieille
19:00 (CEST)	Scoring by quarter: 12–20, 24–15, 22–25, 24–22, Overtime: 13–10
	Pts: James 19; Rebs: Diallo 9 Asts: Diallo 7 PIR: Diallo 25	Boxscore	Pts: Clyburn 28; Rebs: three players 6 Asts: Micić 8 PIR: Clyburn 34	Arena: Salle Gaston Médecin; Attendance: 3,887; Referees: Damir Javor, Carlos Peruga, Elias Koromilas

13 October 2022	Virtus Segafredo Bologna (Italian Basketball Federation)	66–63	(German Basketball Federation) Bayern Munich	Bologna
20:30 (CEST)	Scoring by quarter: 24–16, 10–16, 22–19, 10–12
	Pts: Lundberg 13; Rebs: Mickey 10; Asts: Teodosić, Hackett 3 PIR: Hackett 14	Boxscore	Pts: Weiler-Babb 16; Rebs: Hunter 9 Asts: Weiler-Babb 4 PIR: Weiler-Babb 22	Arena: PalaDozza; Attendance: 4,092; Referees: Ilija Belošević, Benjamín Jiménez, Igor Dragojević

13 October 2022	Barcelona (Spanish Basketball Federation)	75–73	(Spanish Basketball Federation) Real Madrid	Barcelona
20:30 (CEST)	Scoring by quarter: 24–15, 16–15, 23–22, 12–21
	Pts: Şanlı 14; Rebs: Satoranský 7 Asts: Laprovíttola 6 PIR: Satoranský 22	Boxscore	Pts: Deck 21; Rebs: Yabusele 7 Asts: Llull, Rodríguez 4 PIR: Deck 23	Arena: Palau Blaugrana; Attendance: 7,511; Referees: Borys Ryzhyk, Oļegs Latiševs, Milan Nedović

14 October 2022	Fenerbahçe Beko (Turkish Basketball Federation)	86–71	(Israeli Basketball Association) Maccabi Playtika Tel Aviv	Istanbul
19:45 (CEST)	Scoring by quarter: 23–20, 23–12, 19–20, 21–19
	Pts: Gudurić 23; Rebs: Calathes 9 Asts: Calathes 9 PIR: Calathes 26	Boxscore	Pts: Baldwin 14; Rebs: Nebo 7 Asts: Brown 6 PIR: Nebo 16	Arena: Ülker Sports and Event Hall; Attendance: 10,931; Referees: Daniel Hierrezuelo, Mehdi Difallah, Piotr Pastusiak

14 October 2022	Olympiacos (Hellenic Basketball Federation)	90–80	(Lithuanian Basketball Federation) Žalgiris	Piraeus
20:00 (CEST)	Scoring by quarter: 18–21, 26–14, 23–23, 23–22
	Pts: Vezenkov 23; Rebs: Vezenkov 14; Asts: Sloukas, Walkup 6 PIR: Vezenkov 37	Boxscore	Pts: Brazdeikis 21; Rebs: Cavanaugh 7 Asts: three players 3 PIR: Brazdeikis 18	Arena: Peace and Friendship Stadium; Attendance: 0 Referees: Juan Carlos García, Fernando Rocha, Seffi Shemmesh
Note: The game was played behind closed doors due to a punishment to Olympiacos by the EuroLeague.

14 October 2022	Cazoo Baskonia (Spanish Basketball Federation)	103–96(OT)	(Basketball Federation of Serbia) Partizan Mozzart Bet	Vitoria-Gasteiz
20:30 (CEST)	Scoring by quarter: 14–23, 32–19, 21–26, 22–21, Overtime: 14–7
	Pts: Howard 33; Rebs: Giedraitis 9 Asts: Thompson 7 PIR: Howard 27	Boxscore	Pts: Punter 26; Rebs: Lessort 12; Asts: Exum 4 PIR: Lessort 34	Arena: Buesa Arena; Attendance: 6,912; Referees: Robert Lottermoser, Sérgio Silva, Vassilis Pitsilkas

14 October 2022	EA7 Emporio Armani Milan (Italian Basketball Federation)	74–80(OT)	(German Basketball Federation) ALBA Berlin	Assago
20:30 (CEST)	Scoring by quarter: 12–26, 18–12, 21–22, 19–10, Overtime: 4–10
	Pts: Pangos 16; Rebs: Voigtmann 9 Asts: Shields 5 PIR: Hines 17	Boxscore	Pts: Blatt, Smith 13; Rebs: Koumadje, Sikma 7 Asts: Blatt 9 PIR: Blatt 18	Arena: Mediolanum Forum; Attendance: 7,784; Referees: Matej Boltauzer, Gytis Vilius, Uroš Nikolić

14 October 2022	Valencia Basket (Spanish Basketball Federation)	76–77	(French Federation of Basketball) LDLC ASVEL	Valencia
20:45 (CEST)	Scoring by quarter: 27–16, 11–26, 21–20, 17–15
	Pts: Rivero 15; Rebs: Dubljević, Rivero 6 Asts: Dubljević, Harper 5 PIR: Rivero 16	Boxscore	Pts: de Colo 16; Rebs: Fall 13; Asts: de Colo 4 PIR: de Colo 22	Arena: La Fonteta; Attendance: 5,358; Referees: Saša Pukl, Tomislav Hordov, Josip Radojković

=== Round 3 ===
18 October 2022	Žalgiris (Lithuanian Basketball Federation)	68–65	(Italian Basketball Federation) Virtus Segafredo Bologna	Kaunas
19:00 (CEST)	Scoring by quarter: 16–24, 15–14, 21–15, 16–12
	Pts: Brazdeikis 14; Rebs: Hayes, Brazdeikis 6 Asts: Brazdeikis 5 PIR: Brazdeikis 18	Boxscore	Pts: Weems 15; Rebs: Ojeleye 5 Asts: Teodosić 6 PIR: Weems 17	Arena: Žalgirio Arena; Attendance: 11,024; Referees: Robert Lottermoser, Jordi Aliaga, Uroš Nikolić

18 October 2022	Anadolu Efes (Turkish Basketball Federation)	91–92	(Spanish Basketball Federation) Valencia Basket	Istanbul
19:00 (CEST)	Scoring by quarter: 21–20, 24–25, 23–21, 23–26
	Pts: Micić 22; Rebs: M'Baye 6 Asts: Micić 8 PIR: Micić 32	Boxscore	Pts: Dubljević 20; Rebs: Dubljević, Alexander 5 Asts: Jones 8 PIR: Dubljević, Jones 18	Arena: Sinan Erdem Dome; Attendance: 12,903; Referees: Matej Boltauzer, Milivoje Jovčić, Miloš Koljenšić

18 October 2022	Fenerbahçe Beko (Turkish Basketball Federation)	84–63	(French Federation of Basketball) LDLC ASVEL	Istanbul
19:45 (CEST)	Scoring by quarter: 25–19, 17–17, 23–10, 19–17
	Pts: Edwards 19; Rebs: Hayes 6 Asts: Calathes 8 PIR: Calathes 18	Boxscore	Pts: Fall 17; Rebs: Fall 9 Asts: de Colo, Mathews 4 PIR: Fall 24	Arena: Ülker Sports and Event Hall; Attendance: 10,325; Referees: Miguel Ángel Pérez, Luka Kardum, Kristaps Konstantinovs

18 October 2022	Maccabi Playtika Tel Aviv (Israeli Basketball Association)	78–70	(French Federation of Basketball) AS Monaco	Tel Aviv
20:05 (CEST)	Scoring by quarter: 14–20, 17–22, 21–17, 26–11
	Pts: Baldwin 21; Rebs: Sorkin 9 Asts: Brown 7 PIR: Baldwin 28	Boxscore	Pts: Loyd 21; Rebs: Diallo 6 Asts: Loyd 3 PIR: Loyd 30	Arena: Menora Mivtachim Arena; Attendance: 10,325; Referees: Borys Ryzhyk, Fernando Rocha, Sébastien Clivaz

18 October 2022	Bayern Munich (German Basketball Federation)	73–84	(Spanish Basketball Federation) Barcelona	Munich
20:30 (CEST)	Scoring by quarter: 18–18, 16–19, 19–28, 20–19
	Pts: Rubit 19; Rebs: Rubit 7 Asts: Rubit 3 PIR: Rubit 25	Boxscore	Pts: three players 14; Rebs: Kalinić 8 Asts: Satoranský 7 PIR: Veselý 21	Arena: Audi Dome; Attendance: 5,212; Referees: Saša Pukl, Piotr Pastusiak, Elias Koromilas

18 October 2022	Partizan Mozzart Bet (Basketball Federation of Serbia)	75–80	(Italian Basketball Federation) EA7 Emporio Armani Milan	Belgrade
20:45 (CEST)	Scoring by quarter: 27–17, 22–24, 12–21, 14–18
	Pts: LeDay 23; Rebs: Lessort 10; Asts: Madar 4 PIR: LeDay 25	Boxscore	Pts: Shields 25; Rebs: Voigtmann 6 Asts: Voigtmann, Hall 4 PIR: Shields 26	Arena: Štark Arena; Attendance: 16,563; Referees: Daniel Hierrezuelo, Emin Moğulkoç, Ioannis Foufis

19 October 2022	ALBA Berlin (German Basketball Federation)	94–65	(Hellenic Basketball Federation) Panathinaikos	Berlin
20:00 (CEST)	Scoring by quarter: 17–9, 26–24, 21–12, 30–20
	Pts: Sikma 16; Rebs: Sikma 15; Asts: Blatt 7 PIR: Sikma 33	Boxscore	Pts: Grigonis 14; Rebs: Papagiannis 8 Asts: Bochoridis 4 PIR: Andrews 15	Arena: Mercedes-Benz Arena; Attendance: 8,271; Referees: Ilija Belošević, Tomislav Hordov, Hugues Thépénier

19 October 2022	Cazoo Baskonia (Spanish Basketball Federation)	92–75	(Basketball Federation of Serbia) Crvena zvezda mts	Vitoria-Gasteiz
20:30 (CEST)	Scoring by quarter: 23–24, 19–23, 17–10, 33–18
	Pts: Howard 30; Rebs: Giedraitis 6 Asts: Thompson 4 PIR: Howard 32	Boxscore	Pts: Mitrović 17; Rebs: Mitrović 8 Asts: Adams, Marković 5 PIR: Mitrović 27	Arena: Buesa Arena; Attendance: 6,081; Referees: Oļegs Latiševs, Mehdi Difallah, Rain Peerandi

19 October 2022	Real Madrid (Spanish Basketball Federation)	87–89	(Hellenic Basketball Federation) Olympiacos	Madrid
20:45 (CEST)	Scoring by quarter: 21–20, 17–17, 24–26, 25–26
	Pts: Musa 17; Rebs: Deck 7 Asts: Rodríguez 8 PIR: Tavares 17	Boxscore	Pts: Vezenkov 23; Rebs: Vezenkov 12; Asts: Sloukas 7 PIR: Vezenkov 29	Arena: WiZink Center; Attendance: 7,492; Referees: Gytis Vilius, Sašo Petek, Amit Balak

=== Round 4 ===
20 October 2022	Žalgiris (Lithuanian Basketball Federation)	73–72	(Spanish Basketball Federation) Barcelona	Kaunas
19:00 (CEST)	Scoring by quarter: 20–19, 24–16, 11–21, 18–16
	Pts: Evans 18; Rebs: Ulanovas 7 Asts: Evans 4 PIR: Ulanovas 22	Boxscore	Pts: Veselý 12; Rebs: Higgins, Kalinić 5 Asts: Jokubaitis 6 PIR: Higgins 19	Arena: Žalgirio Arena; Attendance: 15,170; Referees: Milivoje Jovčić, Emin Moğulkoç, Michele Rossi

20 October 2022	Fenerbahçe Beko (Turkish Basketball Federation)	79–77	(Spanish Basketball Federation) Valencia Basket	Istanbul
19:45 (CEST)	Scoring by quarter: 20–25, 14–18, 26–15, 19–19
	Pts: Wilbekin 20; Rebs: Pierre 9 Asts: Calathes 7 PIR: Motley 23	Boxscore	Pts: Jones 16; Rebs: Jones 7 Asts: Jones 3 PIR: Jones 20	Arena: Ülker Sports and Event Hall; Attendance: 8,970; Referees: Robert Lottermoser, Saulius Račys, Milan Nedović

20 October 2022	Maccabi Playtika Tel Aviv (Israeli Basketball Association)	88–69	(French Federation of Basketball) LDLC ASVEL	Tel Aviv
20:05 (CEST)	Scoring by quarter: 15–21, 27–20, 26–11, 20–17
	Pts: Brown 17; Rebs: Colson 6 Asts: Baldwin 8 PIR: Brown 19	Boxscore	Pts: de Colo 15; Rebs: Fall 11; Asts: de Colo 3 PIR: Fall 14	Arena: Menora Mivtachim Arena; Attendance: 10,474; Referees: Carlos Peruga, Miloš Koljenšić, Tomasz Trawicki

20 October 2022	Partizan Mozzart Bet (Basketball Federation of Serbia)	90–62	(Italian Basketball Federation) Virtus Segafredo Bologna	Belgrade
20:30 (CEST)	Scoring by quarter: 27–11, 24–21, 18–15, 21–15
	Pts: Nunnally 20; Rebs: LeDay 9 Asts: Nunnally 4 PIR: Nunnally 24	Boxscore	Pts: Bako 11; Rebs: Bako, Weems 4 Asts: Teodosić 4 PIR: Bako 16	Arena: Štark Arena; Attendance: 15,309; Referees: Juan Carlos García, Piotr Pastusiak, Maxime Boubert

20 October 2022	Bayern Munich (German Basketball Federation)	81–83	(Italian Basketball Federation) EA7 Emporio Armani Milan	Munich
20:30 (CEST)	Scoring by quarter: 22–16, 21–21, 23–26, 15–20
	Pts: Winston 20; Rebs: Gillespie 8 Asts: Jaramaz 5 PIR: Winston 28	Boxscore	Pts: Melli 17; Rebs: Hines 9 Asts: Pangos 11; PIR: Melli 29	Arena: Audi Dome; Attendance: 3,071; Referees: Miguel Ángel Pérez, Fernando Rocha, Luka Kardum

21 October 2022	Anadolu Efes (Turkish Basketball Federation)	78–74	(German Basketball Federation) ALBA Berlin	Istanbul
19:30 (CEST)	Scoring by quarter: 22–23, 19–14, 17–23, 20–14
	Pts: Micić 20; Rebs: Clyburn 11; Asts: Micić 11; PIR: Clyburn, Micić 21	Boxscore	Pts: Blatt, Zoosman 15; Rebs: Sikma 7 Asts: Sikma 7 PIR: Koumadje 21	Arena: Sinan Erdem Dome; Attendance: 12,691; Referees: Borys Ryzhyk, Uroš Obrknežević, Jakub Zamojski

21 October 2022	Panathinaikos (Hellenic Basketball Federation)	80–83	(French Federation of Basketball) AS Monaco	Marousi
20:00 (CEST)	Scoring by quarter: 13–29, 21–11, 25–20, 21–23
	Pts: Williams 28; Rebs: Ponitka 10; Asts: Bochoridis 6 PIR: Williams 28	Boxscore	Pts: James 27; Rebs: Brown, Hall 6 Asts: James, Okobo 3 PIR: James 29	Arena: OAKA Altion; Attendance: 6,113; Referees: Sreten Radović, Oļegs Latiševs, Adar Peer

21 October 2022	Cazoo Baskonia (Spanish Basketball Federation)	92–97	(Hellenic Basketball Federation) Olympiacos	Vitoria-Gasteiz
20:30 (CEST)	Scoring by quarter: 16–32, 31–10, 27–23, 18–32
	Pts: Kotsar 16; Rebs: Hommes 5 Asts: Thompson 10; PIR: Kotsar 19	Boxscore	Pts: Vezenkov 26; Rebs: Fall 10; Asts: Walkup 8 PIR: Vezenkov 29	Arena: Buesa Arena; Attendance: 7,680; Referees: Matej Boltauzer, Joseph Bissang, Marcin Kowalski

21 October 2022	Real Madrid (Spanish Basketball Federation)	72–56	(Basketball Federation of Serbia) Crvena zvezda mts	Madrid
20:45 (CEST)	Scoring by quarter: 25–10, 14–20, 15–14, 18–12
	Pts: Musa 13; Rebs: Deck 9 Asts: Rodríguez 8 PIR: Deck 23	Boxscore	Pts: Bentil 17; Rebs: Bentil, Petrušev 5 Asts: Vildoza 4 PIR: Bentil 19	Arena: WiZink Center; Attendance: 7,561; Referees: Saša Pukl, Anne Panther, Robert Vyklický

=== Round 5 ===
27 October 2022	Olympiacos (Hellenic Basketball Federation)	76–81	(French Federation of Basketball) AS Monaco	Piraeus
18:45 (CEST)	Scoring by quarter: 16–17, 21–16, 14–23, 25–25
	Pts: McKissic 15; Rebs: Vezenkov 7 Asts: Sloukas 8 PIR: Sloukas 18	Boxscore	Pts: Okobo 23; Rebs: James 6 Asts: James, Loyd 5 PIR: Okobo 28	Arena: Peace and Friendship Stadium; Attendance: 11,327; Referees: Robert Lottermoser, Carlos Cortés, Mario Majkić

27 October 2022	Maccabi Playtika Tel Aviv (Israeli Basketball Association)	85–74	(Hellenic Basketball Federation) Panathinaikos	Tel Aviv
20:05 (CEST)	Scoring by quarter: 20–17, 27–25, 22–17, 16–15
	Pts: Brown 22; Rebs: Nebo 7 Asts: Brown 9 PIR: Brown 33	Boxscore	Pts: Williams 17; Rebs: Gudaitis 9 Asts: Ponitka, Wolters 5 PIR: Ponitka 17	Arena: Menora Mivtachim Arena; Attendance: 10,461; Referees: Juan Carlos García, Carmelo Paternicò, Gentian Cici

27 October 2022	Valencia Basket (Spanish Basketball Federation)	87–73	(German Basketball Federation) ALBA Berlin	Valencia
20:30 (CEST)	Scoring by quarter: 23–20, 27–19, 22–16, 15–18
	Pts: Jones 20; Rebs: Dubljević 7 Asts: Jones 8 PIR: Jones 28	Boxscore	Pts: Koumadje, Olinde 15; Rebs: Koumadje 10; Asts: Sikma 9 PIR: Koumadje 20	Arena: La Fonteta; Attendance: 5,115; Referees: Sašo Petek, Sérgio Silva, Denis Hadžić

27 October 2022	Partizan Mozzart Bet (Basketball Federation of Serbia)	87–76	(Lithuanian Basketball Federation) Žalgiris	Belgrade
20:30 (CEST)	Scoring by quarter: 20–22, 24–14, 16–21, 27–19
	Pts: Punter 26; Rebs: Lessort 8 Asts: LeDay 4 PIR: Punter 20	Boxscore	Pts: Evans 16; Rebs: Hayes 7 Asts: Evans 9 PIR: Evans 19	Arena: Štark Arena; Attendance: 16,097; Referees: Oļegs Latiševs, Benjamín Jiménez, Hugues Thépénier

27 October 2022	Real Madrid (Spanish Basketball Federation)	91–95	(Italian Basketball Federation) Virtus Segafredo Bologna	Madrid
20:45 (CEST)	Scoring by quarter: 24–18, 21–23, 19–27, 27–27
	Pts: Deck 28; Rebs: Tavares 10; Asts: Musa 4 PIR: Deck 34	Boxscore	Pts: Lundberg 18; Rebs: Ojeleye 5 Asts: Hackett, Teodosić 4 PIR: Bako 22	Arena: WiZink Center; Attendance: 7,099; Referees: Matej Boltauzer, Saulius Račys, Marcin Kowalski

28 October 2022	Crvena zvezda mts (Basketball Federation of Serbia)	78–72	(German Basketball Federation) Bayern Munich	Belgrade
19:00 (CEST)	Scoring by quarter: 28–17, 16–26, 21–14, 13–15
	Pts: Vildoza 20; Rebs: Bentil 13; Asts: Vildoza 6 PIR: Bentil 22	Boxscore	Pts: Winston 18; Rebs: Weiler-Babb 10; Asts: three players 2 PIR: Winston 20	Arena: Aleksandar Nikolić Hall; Attendance: 7,343; Referees: Sreten Radović, Gytis Vilius, Aare Halliko

28 October 2022	Anadolu Efes (Turkish Basketball Federation)	79–88	(Turkish Basketball Federation) Fenerbahçe Beko	Istanbul
19:30 (CEST)	Scoring by quarter: 27–26, 17–23, 18–22, 17–17
	Pts: Micić 19; Rebs: three players 6 Asts: Micić 5 PIR: M'Baye 19	Boxscore	Pts: Wilbekin 25; Rebs: Calathes 7 Asts: Calathes 4 PIR: Gudurić 23	Arena: Sinan Erdem Dome; Attendance: 14,674; Referees: Saša Pukl, Emilio Pérez, Fernando Rocha

28 October 2022	LDLC ASVEL (French Federation of Basketball)	87–61	(Spanish Basketball Federation) Cazoo Baskonia	Villeurbanne
20:00 (CEST)	Scoring by quarter: 24–10, 24–20, 25–22, 14–9
	Pts: Mathews, Obasohan 13; Rebs: Fall 7 Asts: Mathews, Obasohan 5 PIR: Fall 16	Boxscore	Pts: Giedraitis 14; Rebs: Costello 6 Asts: Giedraitis 4 PIR: Giedraitis 18	Arena: Astroballe; Attendance: 5,337; Referees: Borys Ryzhyk, Seffi Shemmesh, Ioannis Foufis

28 October 2022	Barcelona (Spanish Basketball Federation)	74–56	(Italian Basketball Federation) EA7 Emporio Armani Milan	Barcelona
20:30 (CEST)	Scoring by quarter: 21–21, 22–8, 18–12, 13–15
	Pts: Tobey 13; Rebs: Tobey 7 Asts: Laprovíttola 5 PIR: Satoranský 18	Boxscore	Pts: Davies 18; Rebs: Davies, Melli 6 Asts: Pangos 5 PIR: Davies 18	Arena: Palau Blaugrana; Attendance: 6,316; Referees: Ilija Belošević, Damir Javor, Joseph Bissang

=== Round 6 ===
3 November 2022	Cazoo Baskonia (Spanish Basketball Federation)	116–87	(Israeli Basketball Association) Maccabi Playtika Tel Aviv	Vitoria-Gasteiz
20:15 (CET)	Scoring by quarter: 35–20, 28–22, 27–25, 26–20
	Pts: Howard 23; Rebs: three players 6 Asts: Henry, Thompson 8 PIR: Thompson 24	Boxscore	Pts: Brown 20; Rebs: Nebo, Colson 5 Asts: Baldwin 7 PIR: Nebo 21	Arena: Buesa Arena; Attendance: 8,013; Referees: Robert Lottermoser, Milan Nedović, Hugues Thépénier

3 November 2022	Bayern Munich (German Basketball Federation)	81–78	(Turkish Basketball Federation) Anadolu Efes	Munich
20:30 (CET)	Scoring by quarter: 18–18, 20–21, 24–22, 19–17
	Pts: Winston 16; Rebs: Bonga 8 Asts: Winston 7 PIR: Bonga 17	Boxscore	Pts: Micić 24; Rebs: Bryant 8 Asts: Micić, Bryant 4 PIR: Micić 25	Arena: Audi Dome; Attendance: 6,020; Referees: Daniel Hierrezuelo, Sašo Petek, Adar Peer

3 November 2022	EA7 Emporio Armani Milan (Italian Basketball Federation)	77–83	(Spanish Basketball Federation) Real Madrid	Assago
20:30 (CET)	Scoring by quarter: 20–23, 30–24, 11–20, 16–16
	Pts: Pangos 21; Rebs: Hines, Melli 3 Asts: Hall 7 PIR: Pangos 23	Boxscore	Pts: Musa 25; Rebs: Tavares 9 Asts: Musa 5 PIR: Musa 31	Arena: Mediolanum Forum; Attendance: 11,942; Referees: Sreten Radović, Oļegs Latiševs, Tomasz Trawicki

3 November 2022	Panathinaikos (Hellenic Basketball Federation)	89–91	(Basketball Federation of Serbia) Partizan Mozzart Bet	Marousi
20:30 (CET)	Scoring by quarter: 16–31, 25–23, 23–14, 25–23
	Pts: Bacon, Wolters 17; Rebs: Williams 7 Asts: Wolters 4 PIR: Wolters 20	Boxscore	Pts: Punter 29; Rebs: Lessort 11; Asts: Punter 4 PIR: Lessort 28	Arena: OAKA Altion; Attendance: 8,309; Referees: Miguel Ángel Pérez, Fernando Rocha, Saulius Račys

4 November 2022	Žalgiris (Lithuanian Basketball Federation)	88–81	(German Basketball Federation) ALBA Berlin	Kaunas
19:00 (CET)	Scoring by quarter: 13–25, 19–19, 22–17, 34–20
	Pts: Ulanovas 21; Rebs: Šmits 7 Asts: Evans 4 PIR: Ulanovas 23	Boxscore	Pts: Smith 14; Rebs: Smith, Procida 6 Asts: Blatt, Sikma 8 PIR: Olinde 18	Arena: Žalgirio Arena; Attendance: 14,916; Referees: Juan Carlos García, Luka Kardum, Ioannis Foufis

4 November 2022	Olympiacos (Hellenic Basketball Federation)	82–83	(Spanish Basketball Federation) Valencia Basket	Piraeus
20:00 (CET)	Scoring by quarter: 28–22, 19–12, 24–24, 11–25
	Pts: Vezenkov 20; Rebs: Papanikolaou 7 Asts: Vezenkov 7 PIR: Vezenkov 27	Boxscore	Pts: Jones, Dubljević 17; Rebs: Webb 5 Asts: Jones 7 PIR: Jones 23	Arena: Peace and Friendship Stadium; Attendance: 9,237; Referees: Mehdi Difallah, Robert Vyklický, Artūras Šukys

4 November 2022	Barcelona (Spanish Basketball Federation)	81–80	(Turkish Basketball Federation) Fenerbahçe Beko	Barcelona
20:30 (CET)	Scoring by quarter: 21–19, 18–17, 23–13, 19–31
	Pts: Laprovíttola 26; Rebs: Tobey 7 Asts: Laprovíttola 7 PIR: Laprovíttola 28	Boxscore	Pts: Motley 23; Rebs: Motley 7 Asts: Wilbekin 4 PIR: Motley 26	Arena: Palau Blaugrana; Attendance: 6,777; Referees: Matej Boltauzer, Tomislav Hordov, Uroš Nikolić

4 November 2022	Virtus Segafredo Bologna (Italian Basketball Federation)	79–84	(French Federation of Basketball) LDLC ASVEL	Bologna
21:00 (CET)	Scoring by quarter: 22–18, 28–18, 14–27, 15–21
	Pts: Teodosić 14; Rebs: Ojeleye 8 Asts: Hackett, Weems 4 PIR: Bako 20	Boxscore	Pts: Lighty, Mathews 16; Rebs: Fall 7 Asts: de Colo 5 PIR: Lighty 25	Arena: PalaDozza; Attendance: 4,543; Referees: Saša Pukl, Anne Panther, Emilio Pérez

4 November 2022	AS Monaco (French Federation of Basketball)	85–77	(Basketball Federation of Serbia) Crvena zvezda mts	Fontvieille
21:00 (CET)	Scoring by quarter: 17–19, 21–12, 21–22, 26–24
	Pts: James 21; Rebs: Hall 7 Asts: Okobo, Loyd 3 PIR: Loyd 22	Boxscore	Pts: Petrušev 16; Rebs: Petrušev 12; Asts: Petrušev, Vildoza 4 PIR: Petrušev 27	Arena: Salle Gaston Médecin; Attendance: 4,521; Referees: Carlos Peruga, Michele Rossi, Jakub Zamojski

=== Round 7 ===
9 November 2022	EA7 Emporio Armani Milan (Italian Basketball Federation)	59–64	(Italian Basketball Federation) Virtus Segafredo Bologna	Assago
20:30 (CET)	Scoring by quarter: 23–12, 12–27, 6–14, 18–11
	Pts: Mitrou-Long 13; Rebs: Melli 11; Asts: Pangos, Mitrou-Long 4 PIR: Melli 20	Boxscore	Pts: Teodosić 15; Rebs: Jaiteh 7 Asts: Teodosić 4 PIR: Teodosić 16	Arena: Mediolanum Forum; Attendance: 10,475; Referees: Daniel Hierrezuelo, Emin Moğulkoç, Uroš Obrknežević

10 November 2022	Fenerbahçe Beko (Turkish Basketball Federation)	93–79	(Basketball Federation of Serbia) Crvena zvezda mts	Istanbul
18:00 (CET)	Scoring by quarter: 24–23, 18–18, 24–16, 27–22
	Pts: Motley 25; Rebs: Motley 10; Asts: Calathes 6 PIR: Motley 33	Boxscore	Pts: Nedović 17; Rebs: Kuzmić 6 Asts: Nedović 4 PIR: Nedović 20	Arena: Ülker Sports and Event Hall; Attendance: 9,351; Referees: Miguel Ángel Pérez, Leandro Lezcano, Hugues Thépénier

10 November 2022	Real Madrid (Spanish Basketball Federation)	94–85	(Turkish Basketball Federation) Anadolu Efes	Madrid
19:45 (CET)	Scoring by quarter: 26–19, 28–24, 15–20, 25–22
	Pts: Deck, Poirier 13; Rebs: Deck, Poirier 5 Asts: Hanga 6 PIR: Hanga 19	Boxscore	Pts: Clyburn 25; Rebs: Clyburn 9 Asts: Micić 8 PIR: Žižić 23	Arena: WiZink Center; Attendance: 7,345; Referees: Milivoje Jovčić, Gytis Vilius, Milan Nedović

10 November 2022	Olympiacos (Hellenic Basketball Federation)	87–58	(Basketball Federation of Serbia) Partizan Mozzart Bet	Piraeus
20:00 (CET)	Scoring by quarter: 22–14, 23–24, 23–16, 19–4
	Pts: Sloukas 17; Rebs: Vezenkov 7 Asts: Sloukas 8 PIR: Vezenkov, Sloukas 25	Boxscore	Pts: Nunnally, Punter 14; Rebs: Nunnally, Lessort 6 Asts: Nunnally 3 PIR: Lessort 19	Arena: Peace and Friendship Stadium; Attendance: 9,367; Referees: Sreten Radović, Jordi Aliaga, Rain Peerandi

10 November 2022	ALBA Berlin (German Basketball Federation)	77–79	(German Basketball Federation) Bayern Munich	Berlin
20:00 (CET)	Scoring by quarter: 15–26, 24–19, 19–23, 19–11
	Pts: Smith 20; Rebs: Sikma 7 Asts: Sikma 9 PIR: Sikma 27	Boxscore	Pts: Obst, Rubit 14; Rebs: three players 4 Asts: Walden 6 PIR: Walden 17	Arena: Mercedes-Benz Arena; Attendance: 8,556; Referees: Oļegs Latiševs, Uroš Nikolić, Alberto Baena

10 November 2022	Maccabi Playtika Tel Aviv (Israeli Basketball Association)	79–86	(Spanish Basketball Federation) Barcelona	Tel Aviv
20:05 (CET)	Scoring by quarter: 20–23, 23–17, 18–22, 18–24
	Pts: Brown 18; Rebs: Poythress 6 Asts: Brown 5 PIR: Brown 17	Boxscore	Pts: Laprovíttola 19; Rebs: three players 6 Asts: Satoranský 6 PIR: Satoranský 18	Arena: Menora Mivtachim Arena; Attendance: 10,478; Referees: Borys Ryzhyk, Fernando Rocha, Anne Panther

10 November 2022	LDLC ASVEL (French Federation of Basketball)	76–93	(Lithuanian Basketball Federation) Žalgiris	Villeurbanne
21:00 (CET)	Scoring by quarter: 24–22, 22–28, 21–19, 9–24
	Pts: Mathews 15; Rebs: Fall 7 Asts: de Colo 4 PIR: de Colo, Mathews 11	Boxscore	Pts: Dimša 21; Rebs: Evans, Hayes 7 Asts: Evans 8 PIR: Evans, Dimša 25	Arena: Astroballe; Attendance: 5,412; Referees: Robert Lottermoser, Sašo Petek, Gentian Cici

11 November 2022	Panathinaikos (Hellenic Basketball Federation)	98–83	(Spanish Basketball Federation) Cazoo Baskonia	Marousi
20:30 (CET)	Scoring by quarter: 22–18, 16–25, 29–16, 31–24
	Pts: Bacon, Williams 16; Rebs: Papagiannis 11; Asts: Wolters 7 PIR: Papagiannis, Williams 20	Boxscore	Pts: Howard 20; Rebs: Giedraitis 9 Asts: Henry 6 PIR: Howard 14	Arena: OAKA Altion; Attendance: 6,232; Referees: Damir Javor, Tomislav Hordov, Amit Balak

11 November 2022	Valencia Basket (Spanish Basketball Federation)	89–84	(French Federation of Basketball) AS Monaco	Valencia
21:00 (CET)	Scoring by quarter: 20–20, 21–20, 23–14, 25–30
	Pts: Jones 27; Rebs: Webb 8 Asts: Harper 4 PIR: Jones 33	Boxscore	Pts: Loyd 24; Rebs: Brown 6 Asts: James 5 PIR: Loyd 25	Arena: La Fonteta; Attendance: 5,251; Referees: Saša Pukl, Piotr Pastusiak, Miloš Koljenšić

=== Round 8 ===
17 November 2022	Anadolu Efes (Turkish Basketball Federation)	96–86	(Spanish Basketball Federation) Barcelona	Istanbul
18:30 (CET)	Scoring by quarter: 16–22, 29–19, 21–16, 30–29
	Pts: Clyburn 24; Rebs: Clyburn 6 Asts: Micić 5 PIR: Micić 36	Boxscore	Pts: Laprovíttola 28; Rebs: Şanlı 6 Asts: Satoranský 4 PIR: Laprovíttola 27	Arena: Sinan Erdem Dome; Attendance: 15,290; Referees: Robert Lottermoser, Carmelo Paternicò, Luka Kardum

17 November 2022	Crvena zvezda mts (Basketball Federation of Serbia)	71–67	(French Federation of Basketball) LDLC ASVEL	Belgrade
19:00 (CET)	Scoring by quarter: 17–14, 21–9, 16–30, 17–14
	Pts: Ivanović 16; Rebs: Mitrović 8 Asts: Bentil, Ivanović 3 PIR: Ivanović 22	Boxscore	Pts: Lighty 16; Rebs: three players 5 Asts: Diot 4 PIR: Kahudi 15	Arena: Aleksandar Nikolić Hall; Attendance: 6,987; Referees: Juan Carlos García, Marcin Kowalski, Vasiliki Tsaroucha

17 November 2022	Virtus Segafredo Bologna (Italian Basketball Federation)	89–59	(Spanish Basketball Federation) Valencia Basket	Bologna
20:30 (CET)	Scoring by quarter: 24–8, 18–17, 24–17, 23–17
	Pts: Mickey 16; Rebs: Weems 7 Asts: Teodosić 6 PIR: Mickey 20	Boxscore	Pts: Jones 10; Rebs: three players 5 Asts: Harper, Prepelič 3 PIR: Jones, Puerto 11	Arena: PalaDozza; Attendance: 4,547; Referees: Oļegs Latiševs, Gytis Vilius, Jakub Zamojski

17 November 2022	Bayern Munich (German Basketball Federation)	71–82	(Hellenic Basketball Federation) Olympiacos	Munich
20:30 (CET)	Scoring by quarter: 11–27, 23–13, 20–27, 17–15
	Pts: Jaramaz 12; Rebs: Bonga, Gillespie 6 Asts: Winston 5 PIR: Jaramaz 16	Boxscore	Pts: Vezenkov 20; Rebs: Vezenkov 13; Asts: Walkup 7 PIR: Vezenkov 43	Arena: Audi Dome; Attendance: 6,391; Referees: Matej Boltauzer, Benjamín Jiménez, Sébastien Clivaz

17 November 2022	Real Madrid (Spanish Basketball Federation)	90–72	(German Basketball Federation) ALBA Berlin	Madrid
20:45 (CET)	Scoring by quarter: 26–20, 27–17, 17–15, 20–20
	Pts: Poirier 19; Rebs: Poirier 7 Asts: Rodríguez 10; PIR: Poirier 28	Boxscore	Pts: Procida 13; Rebs: Schneider 7 Asts: Delow, Blatt 3 PIR: three players 11	Arena: WiZink Center; Attendance: 6,512; Referees: Borys Ryzhyk, Elias Koromilas, Aare Halliko

18 November 2022	Fenerbahçe Beko (Turkish Basketball Federation)	107–77	(Hellenic Basketball Federation) Panathinaikos	Istanbul
18:45 (CET)	Scoring by quarter: 22–25, 33–15, 23–15, 29–22
	Pts: Wilbekin 19; Rebs: Edwards 6 Asts: Calathes 7 PIR: Hayes 21	Boxscore	Pts: Bacon 20; Rebs: Bacon 5 Asts: Wolters 5 PIR: Bacon 19	Arena: Ülker Sports and Event Hall; Attendance: 12,441; Referees: Sreten Radović, Mehdi Difallah, Carlos Cortés

18 November 2022	Žalgiris (Lithuanian Basketball Federation)	71–62	(Italian Basketball Federation) EA7 Emporio Armani Milan	Kaunas
19:00 (CET)	Scoring by quarter: 16–11, 18–13, 15–15, 22–23
	Pts: Evans 23; Rebs: Šmits 10; Asts: three players 2 PIR: Šmits 17	Boxscore	Pts: Mitrou-Long 19; Rebs: Melli 7 Asts: Hines 3 PIR: Mitrou-Long 16	Arena: Žalgirio Arena; Attendance: 15,208; Referees: Miguel Ángel Pérez, Milan Nedović, Robert Vyklický

18 November 2022	AS Monaco (French Federation of Basketball)	79–74	(Spanish Basketball Federation) Cazoo Baskonia	Fontvieille
19:00 (CET)	Scoring by quarter: 20–24, 28–21, 10–18, 21–11
	Pts: Okobo 22; Rebs: Moerman 5 Asts: James 7 PIR: Okobo 19	Boxscore	Pts: Henry 17; Rebs: Costello 9 Asts: Henry 7 PIR: Henry 21	Arena: Salle Gaston Médecin; Attendance: 3,655; Referees: Ilija Belošević, Igor Dragojević, Tomasz Trawicki

18 November 2022	Partizan Mozzart Bet (Basketball Federation of Serbia)	96–88	(Israeli Basketball Association) Maccabi Playtika Tel Aviv	Belgrade
20:30 (CET)	Scoring by quarter: 22–26, 27–24, 20–18, 27–20
	Pts: LeDay, Exum 21; Rebs: Lessort 8 Asts: Exum 5 PIR: Exum 31	Boxscore	Pts: Baldwin 23; Rebs: three players 4 Asts: Baldwin 7 PIR: Baldwin 26	Arena: Štark Arena; Attendance: 19,011; Referees: Daniel Hierrezuelo, Emin Moğulkoç, Joseph Bissang

=== Round 9 ===
22 November 2022	AS Monaco (French Federation of Basketball)	93–96	(Turkish Basketball Federation) Fenerbahçe Beko	Fontvieille
19:00 (CET)	Scoring by quarter: 18–21, 20–24, 22–34, 33–17
	Pts: Loyd 18; Rebs: Hall 8 Asts: James, Okobo 5 PIR: Loyd 24	Boxscore	Pts: Hayes 21; Rebs: Jekiri 6 Asts: Calathes, Wilbekin 7 PIR: Calathes 25	Arena: Salle Gaston Médecin; Attendance: 4,321; Referees: Daniel Hierrezuelo, Fernando Rocha, Mario Majkić

22 November 2022	ALBA Berlin (German Basketball Federation)	84–88(OT)	(Basketball Federation of Serbia) Crvena zvezda mts	Berlin
20:00 (CET)	Scoring by quarter: 19–20, 21–17, 17–18, 18–20, Overtime: 9–13
	Pts: Smith 23; Rebs: Smith 8 Asts: Sikma, Blatt 7 PIR: Smith 22	Boxscore	Pts: Vildoza 21; Rebs: Petrušev 8 Asts: Nedović 6 PIR: Vildoza 22	Arena: Mercedes-Benz Arena; Attendance: 7,117; Referees: Sreten Radović, Emilio Pérez, Tomasz Trawicki

22 November 2022	Maccabi Playtika Tel Aviv (Israeli Basketball Association)	90–84	(Hellenic Basketball Federation) Olympiacos	Tel Aviv
20:05 (CET)	Scoring by quarter: 22–20, 21–25, 20–24, 27–15
	Pts: Baldwin 22; Rebs: DiBartolomeo, Nebo 7 Asts: Brown 6 PIR: Baldwin 24	Boxscore	Pts: Larentzakis 21; Rebs: Vezenkov 10; Asts: Walkup 9 PIR: Vezenkov 18	Arena: Menora Mivtachim Arena; Attendance: 9,996; Referees: Ilija Belošević, Tomislav Hordov, Jurgis Laurinavičius

22 November 2022	Valencia Basket (Spanish Basketball Federation)	73–80	(Spanish Basketball Federation) Real Madrid	Valencia
20:30 (CET)	Scoring by quarter: 19–31, 12–10, 15–18, 27–21
	Pts: Van Rossom 17; Rebs: Alexander, Claver 5 Asts: Harper 5 PIR: Claver 19	Boxscore	Pts: Musa 28; Rebs: Deck 10; Asts: Tavares 6 PIR: Musa 32	Arena: La Fonteta; Attendance: 7,506; Referees: Robert Lottermoser, Ioannis Foufis, Michele Rossi

22 November 2022	EA7 Emporio Armani Milan (Italian Basketball Federation)	51–80	(Turkish Basketball Federation) Anadolu Efes	Assago
20:30 (CET)	Scoring by quarter: 18–18, 16–16, 7–21, 10–25
	Pts: Mitrou-Long 10; Rebs: Voigtmann 6 Asts: Voigtmann 4 PIR: Melli 13	Boxscore	Pts: Clyburn 24; Rebs: Clyburn 9 Asts: Beaubois 7 PIR: Clyburn 29	Arena: Mediolanum Forum; Attendance: 9,070; Referees: Juan Carlos García, Joseph Bissang, Saulius Račys

22 November 2022	Barcelona (Spanish Basketball Federation)	79–68	(Basketball Federation of Serbia) Partizan Mozzart Bet	Barcelona
20:45 (CET)	Scoring by quarter: 17–21, 22–11, 25–17, 15–19
	Pts: Laprovíttola 13; Rebs: da Silva 10; Asts: Laprovíttola 6 PIR: Laprovíttola 14	Boxscore	Pts: Anđušić 23; Rebs: Brodziansky, Lessort 5 Asts: Anđušić, Madar 2 PIR: Anđušić 28	Arena: Palau Blaugrana; Attendance: 5,066; Referees: Oļegs Latiševs, Mehdi Difallah, Sérgio Silva

23 November 2022	Panathinaikos (Hellenic Basketball Federation)	88–85(OT)	(Italian Basketball Federation) Virtus Segafredo Bologna	Marousi
20:00 (CET)	Scoring by quarter: 12–21, 26–20, 29–21, 9–14, Overtime: 12–9
	Pts: Williams 26; Rebs: Williams 8 Asts: Wolters 4 PIR: Williams 30	Boxscore	Pts: Jaiteh 20; Rebs: Jaiteh, Mickey 10; Asts: Lundberg 8 PIR: Jaiteh 24	Arena: OAKA Altion; Attendance: 5,125; Referees: Matej Boltauzer, Benjamín Jiménez, Rain Peerandi

23 November 2022	LDLC ASVEL (French Federation of Basketball)	74–75	(German Basketball Federation) Bayern Munich	Villeurbanne
20:00 (CET)	Scoring by quarter: 15–25, 18–17, 20–11, 21–22
	Pts: de Colo 15; Rebs: Fall, Jackson-Cartwright 6 Asts: Lighty 5 PIR: de Colo 16	Boxscore	Pts: Lučić 13; Rebs: Hunter 7 Asts: Weiler-Babb 5 PIR: Lučić 22	Arena: Astroballe; Attendance: 5,337; Referees: Damir Javor, Carlos Peruga, Robert Vyklický

23 November 2022	Cazoo Baskonia (Spanish Basketball Federation)	93–73	(Lithuanian Basketball Federation) Žalgiris	Vitoria-Gasteiz
20:30 (CET)	Scoring by quarter: 21–20, 21–24, 22–14, 29–15
	Pts: Thompson, Costello 19; Rebs: Costello 7 Asts: Thompson, Howard 5 PIR: Costello 25	Boxscore	Pts: Ulanovas 18; Rebs: Šmits 7 Asts: Ulanovas, Hayes 3 PIR: Ulanovas 23	Arena: Buesa Arena; Attendance: 7,834; Referees: Borys Ryzhyk, Saša Pukl, Maxime Boubert

=== Round 10 ===
24 November 2022	Crvena zvezda mts (Basketball Federation of Serbia)	69–68	(Israeli Basketball Association) Maccabi Playtika Tel Aviv	Belgrade
17:30 (CET)	Scoring by quarter: 27–18, 9–11, 14–18, 19–21
	Pts: Nedović 12; Rebs: Martin 6 Asts: Ivanović, Vildoza 3 PIR: Martin 13	Boxscore	Pts: Brown 23; Rebs: Brown, Sorkin 6 Asts: Brown 7 PIR: Brown 30	Arena: Aleksandar Nikolić Hall; Attendance: 6,453; Referees: Oļegs Latiševs, Mehdi Difallah, Saulius Račys

24 November 2022	Olympiacos (Hellenic Basketball Federation)	86–76	(German Basketball Federation) ALBA Berlin	Piraeus
20:00 (CET)	Scoring by quarter: 18–21, 21–17, 22–21, 25–17
	Pts: Vezenkov 24; Rebs: Papanikolaou 9 Asts: Sloukas 11; PIR: Vezenkov 34	Boxscore	Pts: Lô, Smith 12; Rebs: Koumadje 7 Asts: Lô 7 PIR: Koumadje 18	Arena: Peace and Friendship Stadium; Attendance: 8,288; Referees: Daniel Hierrezuelo, Leandro Lezcano, Josip Radojković

24 November 2022	EA7 Emporio Armani Milan (Italian Basketball Federation)	72–82	(Turkish Basketball Federation) Fenerbahçe Beko	Assago
20:30 (CET)	Scoring by quarter: 21–15, 16–17, 11–26, 24–24
	Pts: Mitrou-Long 18; Rebs: Melli 6 Asts: Mitrou-Long 4 PIR: Hall 13	Boxscore	Pts: Hayes 22; Rebs: Gudurić 6 Asts: Gudurić, Calathes 6 PIR: Hayes 31	Arena: Mediolanum Forum; Attendance: 9,085; Referees: Robert Lottermoser, Gytis Vilius, Uroš Nikolić

24 November 2022	Real Madrid (Spanish Basketball Federation)	105–97	(Basketball Federation of Serbia) Partizan Mozzart Bet	Madrid
20:45 (CET)	Scoring by quarter: 32–40, 22–11, 32–23, 19–23
	Pts: Llull 20; Rebs: Tavares 8 Asts: Musa, Deck 4 PIR: Tavares, Deck 21	Boxscore	Pts: LeDay 20; Rebs: LeDay 6 Asts: LeDay 6 PIR: LeDay 28	Arena: WiZink Center; Attendance: 6,687; Referees: Fernando Rocha, Carmelo Paternicò, Amit Balak

25 November 2022	AS Monaco (French Federation of Basketball)	80–79	(German Basketball Federation) Bayern Munich	Fontvieille
19:00 (CET)	Scoring by quarter: 17–14, 17–19, 19–17, 27–29
	Pts: Okobo 16; Rebs: Blossomgame 7 Asts: James 6 PIR: James 20	Boxscore	Pts: Obst 18; Rebs: Rubit 6 Asts: Winston 4 PIR: Rubit 20	Arena: Salle Gaston Médecin; Attendance: 3,977; Referees: Juan Carlos García, Emin Moğulkoç, Vassilis Pitsilkas

25 November 2022	Panathinaikos (Hellenic Basketball Federation)	77–58	(French Federation of Basketball) LDLC ASVEL	Marousi
20:00 (CET)	Scoring by quarter: 15–11, 24–13, 27–13, 11–21
	Pts: Bacon 25; Rebs: Gudaitis, Williams 6 Asts: Ponitka 7 PIR: Bacon 26	Boxscore	Pts: Pons 11; Rebs: Tyus 9 Asts: Jackson-Cartwright 5 PIR: Fall 12	Arena: OAKA Altion; Attendance: 6,452; Referees: Miguel Ángel Pérez, Borys Ryzhyk, Tomasz Trawicki

25 November 2022	Virtus Segafredo Bologna (Italian Basketball Federation)	80–85	(Turkish Basketball Federation) Anadolu Efes	Bologna
20:30 (CET)	Scoring by quarter: 18–19, 16–21, 19–23, 27–22
	Pts: Lundberg 22; Rebs: Mickey 7 Asts: Teodosić 4 PIR: Lundberg 20	Boxscore	Pts: Clyburn 21; Rebs: Beaubois 8 Asts: Micić 5 PIR: Beaubois 30	Arena: PalaDozza; Attendance: 5,205; Referees: Damir Javor, Emilio Pérez, Seffi Shemmesh

25 November 2022	Barcelona (Spanish Basketball Federation)	96–84	(Spanish Basketball Federation) Cazoo Baskonia	Barcelona
20:30 (CET)	Scoring by quarter: 22–22, 30–26, 24–25, 20–11
	Pts: Veselý 18; Rebs: Satoranský 6 Asts: Laprovíttola 6 PIR: Veselý 25	Boxscore	Pts: Howard 25; Rebs: Enoch 5 Asts: Henry 6 PIR: Howard 25	Arena: Palau Blaugrana; Attendance: 5,599; Referees: Matej Boltauzer, Milivoje Jovčić, Joseph Bissang

25 November 2022	Valencia Basket (Spanish Basketball Federation)	76–80	(Lithuanian Basketball Federation) Žalgiris	Valencia
20:45 (CET)	Scoring by quarter: 31–24, 13–13, 17–22, 15–21
	Pts: Jones 19; Rebs: Jones 5 Asts: Jones 7 PIR: Jones 29	Boxscore	Pts: Šmits 19; Rebs: Šmits 7 Asts: Evans 5 PIR: Šmits 23	Arena: La Fonteta; Attendance: 6,212; Referees: Sreten Radović, Ilija Belošević, Sérgio Silva

=== Round 11 ===
1 December 2022	ALBA Berlin (German Basketball Federation)	86–88	(Spanish Basketball Federation) Barcelona	Berlin
18:30 (CET)	Scoring by quarter: 19–30, 27–15, 11–26, 29–17
	Pts: Blatt 17; Rebs: Thiemann 7 Asts: Blatt 6 PIR: Thiemann 22	Boxscore	Pts: Mirotić 19; Rebs: Mirotić, Satoranský 6 Asts: Laprovíttola 6 PIR: Mirotić 29	Arena: Mercedes-Benz Arena; Attendance: 8,916; Referees: Damir Javor, Robert Vyklický, Uroš Obrknežević

1 December 2022	Anadolu Efes (Turkish Basketball Federation)	82–71	(Hellenic Basketball Federation) Olympiacos	Istanbul
18:30 (CET)	Scoring by quarter: 13–18, 20–23, 19–12, 30–18
	Pts: Clyburn 24; Rebs: Micić 9 Asts: Micić 9 PIR: Micić 31	Boxscore	Pts: Vezenkov 18; Rebs: Sloukas, Fall 6 Asts: Sloukas 6 PIR: Sloukas 19	Arena: Sinan Erdem Dome; Attendance: 13,044; Referees: Sreten Radović, Gytis Vilius, Carlos Peruga

1 December 2022	LDLC ASVEL (French Federation of Basketball)	75–84	(French Federation of Basketball) AS Monaco	Villeurbanne
20:00 (CET)	Scoring by quarter: 20–20, 25–25, 15–15, 15–24
	Pts: Obasohan, Lighty 13; Rebs: Pons, Lighty 5 Asts: de Colo 4 PIR: Obasohan, Lighty 14	Boxscore	Pts: Motiejūnas, James 17; Rebs: Motiejūnas, Diallo 6 Asts: Okobo 5 PIR: Motiejūnas 17	Arena: Astroballe; Attendance: 5,468; Referees: Robert Lottermoser, Milan Nedović, Eduard Udyanskyy

1 December 2022	Cazoo Baskonia (Spanish Basketball Federation)	78–62	(Italian Basketball Federation) EA7 Emporio Armani Milan	Vitoria-Gasteiz
20:30 (CET)	Scoring by quarter: 24–9, 14–18, 16–18, 24–17
	Pts: Thompson 15; Rebs: Kotsar 9 Asts: Thompson 7 PIR: Thompson 19	Boxscore	Pts: Davies 23; Rebs: Davies 12; Asts: Mitrou-Long 4 PIR: Davies 33	Arena: Buesa Arena; Attendance: 6,585; Referees: Oļegs Latiševs, Mehdi Difallah, Tomislav Hordov

1 December 2022	Partizan Mozzart Bet (Basketball Federation of Serbia)	96–100(OT)	(Spanish Basketball Federation) Valencia Basket	Belgrade
20:45 (CET)	Scoring by quarter: 21–21, 22–16, 21–23, 20–24, Overtime: 12–16
	Pts: Lessort 22; Rebs: Lessort 10; Asts: Exum 6 PIR: Lessort 37	Boxscore	Pts: Rivero 22; Rebs: Webb 9 Asts: three players 5 PIR: López-Arostegui 23	Arena: Štark Arena; Attendance: 14,816; Referees: Borys Ryzhyk, Seffi Shemmesh, Thomas Bissuel

2 December 2022	Crvena zvezda mts (Basketball Federation of Serbia)	83–74	(Italian Basketball Federation) Virtus Segafredo Bologna	Belgrade
18:00 (CET)	Scoring by quarter: 17–23, 25–18, 25–14, 16–19
	Pts: Dobrić 20; Rebs: Marković 8 Asts: Vildoza, Marković 5 PIR: Mitrović 21	Boxscore	Pts: Jaiteh 15; Rebs: Jaiteh 9 Asts: Cordinier, Mickey 3 PIR: Jaiteh 27	Arena: Aleksandar Nikolić Hall; Attendance: 7,146; Referees: Miguel Ángel Pérez, Emin Moğulkoç, Leandro Lezcano

2 December 2022	Fenerbahçe Beko (Turkish Basketball Federation)	71–85	(Spanish Basketball Federation) Real Madrid	Istanbul
18:45 (CET)	Scoring by quarter: 16–25, 18–21, 20–22, 17–17
	Pts: Motley 20; Rebs: Motley 7 Asts: Calathes 6 PIR: Booker 17	Boxscore	Pts: Musa 18; Rebs: Deck 8 Asts: Musa 6 PIR: Tavares 26	Arena: Ülker Sports and Event Hall; Attendance: 12,476; Referees: Saša Pukl, Ilija Belošević, Luka Kardum

2 December 2022	Žalgiris (Lithuanian Basketball Federation)	67–81	(Hellenic Basketball Federation) Panathinaikos	Kaunas
19:00 (CET)	Scoring by quarter: 13–27, 15–17, 25–16, 14–21
	Pts: Evans 18; Rebs: Hayes, Ulanovas 4 Asts: Evans 5 PIR: Evans 18	Boxscore	Pts: Williams 25; Rebs: Papagiannis 13; Asts: Wolters, Lee 4 PIR: Williams 30	Arena: Žalgirio Arena; Attendance: 15,203; Referees: Daniel Hierrezuelo, Uroš Nikolić, Hugues Thépénier

2 December 2022	Bayern Munich (German Basketball Federation)	98–89	(Israeli Basketball Association) Maccabi Playtika Tel Aviv	Munich
20:30 (CET)	Scoring by quarter: 26–24, 24–20, 23–23, 25–22
	Pts: Winston 23; Rebs: Bonga 9 Asts: Jaramaz 5 PIR: Winston 20	Boxscore	Pts: Brown 36; Rebs: Adams, Colson 5 Asts: Brown 7 PIR: Brown 43	Arena: Audi Dome; Attendance: 4,688; Referees: Milivoje Jovčić, Emilio Pérez, Sašo Petek

=== Round 12 ===
8 December 2022	Panathinaikos (Hellenic Basketball Federation)	90–77(OT)	(Italian Basketball Federation) EA7 Emporio Armani Milan	Marousi
20:00 (CET)	Scoring by quarter: 13–22, 20–20, 19–17, 20–13, Overtime: 18–5
	Pts: Bacon 31; Rebs: Ponitka 9 Asts: Lee 5 PIR: Bacon 28	Boxscore	Pts: Mitrou-Long 16; Rebs: Melli, Hall 6 Asts: Melli 6 PIR: Melli 18	Arena: OAKA Altion; Attendance: 9,852; Referees: Ilija Belošević, Emin Moğulkoç, Emilio Pérez

8 December 2022	ALBA Berlin (German Basketball Federation)	75–104	(Turkish Basketball Federation) Fenerbahçe Beko	Berlin
20:00 (CET)	Scoring by quarter: 18–24, 17–30, 17–30, 23–20
	Pts: Smith 15; Rebs: Zoosman 5 Asts: Blatt, Zoosman 4 PIR: Thiemann 18	Boxscore	Pts: Edwards, Gudurić 13; Rebs: Jekiri 10; Asts: Edwards 8 PIR: Gudurić 20	Arena: Mercedes-Benz Arena; Attendance: 13,166; Referees: Mehdi Difallah, Carlos Peruga, Sašo Petek

8 December 2022	Maccabi Playtika Tel Aviv (Israeli Basketball Association)	84–68	(Spanish Basketball Federation) Valencia Basket	Tel Aviv
20:05 (CET)	Scoring by quarter: 15–10, 20–17, 23–23, 26–18
	Pts: Brown 15; Rebs: Nebo 6 Asts: Brown 6 PIR: Hilliard 17	Boxscore	Pts: López-Arostegui 15; Rebs: three players 5 Asts: Prepelič 5 PIR: López-Arostegui 17	Arena: Menora Mivtachim Arena; Attendance: 10,017; Referees: Matej Boltauzer, Uroš Nikolić, Tomasz Trawicki

8 December 2022	Partizan Mozzart Bet (Basketball Federation of Serbia)	73–76	(Basketball Federation of Serbia) Crvena zvezda mts	Belgrade
20:30 (CET)	Scoring by quarter: 20–11, 13–29, 19–14, 21–22
	Pts: Punter 15; Rebs: Lessort 10; Asts: three players 3 PIR: Lessort 24	Boxscore	Pts: Nedović 20; Rebs: Martin 7 Asts: Vildoza 6 PIR: Vildoza 21	Arena: Štark Arena; Attendance: 18,340; Referees: Juan Carlos García, Robert Lottermoser, Gytis Vilius

8 December 2022	Real Madrid (Spanish Basketball Federation)	94–95(OT)	(French Federation of Basketball) AS Monaco	Madrid
21:00 (CET)	Scoring by quarter: 23–17, 25–28, 14–20, 26–23, Overtime: 6–7
	Pts: Musa 24; Rebs: Tavares 18; Asts: Williams-Goss 5 PIR: Tavares 28	Boxscore	Pts: James 28; Rebs: Diallo 8 Asts: Loyd 4 PIR: James 27	Arena: WiZink Center; Attendance: 8,073; Referees: Damir Javor, Tomislav Hordov, Gentian Cici

9 December 2022	Žalgiris (Lithuanian Basketball Federation)	60–86	(Turkish Basketball Federation) Anadolu Efes	Kaunas
19:00 (CET)	Scoring by quarter: 19–25, 14–8, 15–30, 12–23
	Pts: Cavanaugh 15; Rebs: Cavanaugh 8 Asts: Ulanovas 6 PIR: Cavanaugh 21	Boxscore	Pts: Beaubois 20; Rebs: Dunston 5 Asts: Beaubois 7 PIR: Beaubois 24	Arena: Žalgirio Arena; Attendance: 15,109; Referees: Oļegs Latiševs, Benjamín Jiménez, Anne Panther

9 December 2022	Olympiacos (Hellenic Basketball Federation)	117–71	(Italian Basketball Federation) Virtus Segafredo Bologna	Piraeus
20:00 (CET)	Scoring by quarter: 31–15, 30–20, 23–20, 33–16
	Pts: Vezenkov 19; Rebs: Fall 5 Asts: Walkup 8 PIR: Vezenkov 20	Boxscore	Pts: Mickey 12; Rebs: Bako 7 Asts: Teodosić 5 PIR: Bako 17	Arena: Peace and Friendship Stadium; Attendance: 8,312; Referees: Borys Ryzhyk, Joseph Bissang, Milan Nedović

9 December 2022	Cazoo Baskonia (Spanish Basketball Federation)	78–53	(German Basketball Federation) Bayern Munich	Vitoria-Gasteiz
20:30 (CET)	Scoring by quarter: 17–10, 27–20, 11–12, 23–11
	Pts: Henry, Costello 14; Rebs: Costello 7 Asts: Henry 10; PIR: Henry 28	Boxscore	Pts: Obst 12; Rebs: Gillespie 12; Asts: Bonga 3 PIR: Gillespie 20	Arena: Buesa Arena; Attendance: 7,688; Referees: Sreten Radović, Fernando Rocha, Piotr Pastusiak

9 December 2022	Barcelona (Spanish Basketball Federation)	74–75	(French Federation of Basketball) LDLC ASVEL	Barcelona
20:30 (CET)	Scoring by quarter: 15–21, 31–19, 16–17, 12–18
	Pts: Mirotić 17; Rebs: Satoranský, Mirotić 5 Asts: Şanlı 4 PIR: Mirotić 21	Boxscore	Pts: de Colo 19; Rebs: Fall 18; Asts: de Colo 3 PIR: Fall 24	Arena: Palau Blaugrana; Attendance: 5,737; Referees: Saša Pukl, Luka Kardum, Michele Rossi

=== Round 13 ===
13 December 2022	Olympiacos (Hellenic Basketball Federation)	94–67	(Turkish Basketball Federation) Fenerbahçe Beko	Piraeus
19:00 (CET)	Scoring by quarter: 31–11, 27–20, 16–20, 20–16
	Pts: Vezenkov 21; Rebs: three players 4 Asts: Sloukas 7 PIR: Vezenkov 27	Boxscore	Pts: Edwards 13; Rebs: Booker 7 Asts: Gudurić 4 PIR: Gudurić 13	Arena: Peace and Friendship Stadium; Attendance: 9,892; Referees: Juan Carlos García, Oļegs Latiševs, Damir Javor

13 December 2022	Crvena zvezda mts (Basketball Federation of Serbia)	77–73	(Lithuanian Basketball Federation) Žalgiris	Belgrade
19:00 (CET)	Scoring by quarter: 14–22, 22–15, 20–21, 21–15
	Pts: Vildoza 27; Rebs: four players 4 Asts: Nedović 4 PIR: Vildoza 24	Boxscore	Pts: Evans 18; Rebs: Evans 8 Asts: three players 3 PIR: Ulanovas 20	Arena: Aleksandar Nikolić Hall; Attendance: 7,488; Referees: Carmelo Paternicò, Joseph Bissang, Jordi Aliaga

13 December 2022	LDLC ASVEL (French Federation of Basketball)	91–87	(Basketball Federation of Serbia) Partizan Mozzart Bet	Villeurbanne
20:00 (CET)	Scoring by quarter: 25–25, 22–23, 26–18, 18–21
	Pts: de Colo 32; Rebs: Noua 5 Asts: Lighty, de Colo 3 PIR: de Colo 30	Boxscore	Pts: Exum 26; Rebs: Lessort 8 Asts: Exum 6 PIR: Exum 35	Arena: Astroballe; Attendance: 4,897; Referees: Daniel Hierrezuelo, Anne Panther, Jakub Zamojski

13 December 2022	Bayern Munich (German Basketball Federation)	64–68	(Spanish Basketball Federation) Real Madrid	Munich
20:30 (CET)	Scoring by quarter: 22–21, 17–21, 11–12, 14–14
	Pts: Hunter 14; Rebs: Weiler-Babb, Bonga 6 Asts: Hunter 3 PIR: Bonga 16	Boxscore	Pts: Tavares 14; Rebs: Tavares 8 Asts: Abalde 4 PIR: Tavares 17	Arena: Audi Dome; Attendance: 6,500; Referees: Matej Boltauzer, Mehdi Difallah, Seffi Shemmesh

13 December 2022	EA7 Emporio Armani Milan (Italian Basketball Federation)	71–77	(Israeli Basketball Association) Maccabi Playtika Tel Aviv	Assago
20:30 (CET)	Scoring by quarter: 21–21, 19–11, 19–27, 12–18
	Pts: Baron 18; Rebs: Baron 5 Asts: Luwawu-Cabarrot, Hall 4 PIR: Baron 23	Boxscore	Pts: Brown 20; Rebs: Colson 7 Asts: Brown 8 PIR: Sorkin 21	Arena: Mediolanum Forum; Attendance: 7,500; Referees: Miguel Ángel Pérez, Fernando Rocha, Josip Radojković

13 December 2022	Valencia Basket (Spanish Basketball Federation)	94–91(OT)	(Hellenic Basketball Federation) Panathinaikos	Valencia
20:45 (CET)	Scoring by quarter: 20–26, 24–15, 26–22, 14–21, Overtime: 10–7
	Pts: Dubljević 23; Rebs: Webb 10; Asts: Jones 6 PIR: Dubljević 33	Boxscore	Pts: Bacon 22; Rebs: Williams, Ponitka 9 Asts: Lee 6 PIR: Williams 30	Arena: La Fonteta; Attendance: 4,978; Referees: Robert Lottermoser, Milivoje Jovčić, Jurgis Laurinavičius

14 December 2022	Anadolu Efes (Turkish Basketball Federation)	78–83	(Spanish Basketball Federation) Cazoo Baskonia	Istanbul
18:30 (CET)	Scoring by quarter: 23–21, 23–15, 12–28, 20–19
	Pts: Micić 17; Rebs: Bryant 5 Asts: Micić 6 PIR: Clyburn 16	Boxscore	Pts: Howard 19; Rebs: Giedraitis, Enoch 6 Asts: Giedraitis, Thompson 3 PIR: Giedraitis 18	Arena: Sinan Erdem Dome; Attendance: 13,243; Referees: Ilija Belošević, Sašo Petek, Amit Balak

14 December 2022	AS Monaco (French Federation of Basketball)	63–69	(Spanish Basketball Federation) Barcelona	Fontvieille
19:00 (CET)	Scoring by quarter: 13–16, 16–18, 16–26, 18–9
	Pts: James 16; Rebs: Diallo, Blossomgame 6 Asts: James 4 PIR: James 13	Boxscore	Pts: Mirotić 15; Rebs: Mirotić 9 Asts: Laprovíttola 8 PIR: Mirotić 22	Arena: Salle Gaston Médecin; Attendance: 4,009; Referees: Borys Ryzhyk, Sreten Radović, Gytis Vilius

14 December 2022	Virtus Segafredo Bologna (Italian Basketball Federation)	85–76	(German Basketball Federation) ALBA Berlin	Bologna
20:30 (CET)	Scoring by quarter: 18–15, 22–14, 23–23, 22–24
	Pts: Weems 16; Rebs: Jaiteh 6 Asts: Teodosić 9 PIR: Weems 16	Boxscore	Pts: Sikma 16; Rebs: Sikma 6 Asts: Sikma 5 PIR: Sikma 24	Arena: Segafredo Arena; Attendance: 4,703; Referees: Saša Pukl, Ioannis Foufis, Sébastien Clivaz

=== Round 14 ===
15 December 2022	Žalgiris (Lithuanian Basketball Federation)	81–72	(Spanish Basketball Federation) Real Madrid	Kaunas
19:00 (CET)	Scoring by quarter: 18–21, 19–14, 19–20, 25–17
	Pts: Evans 20; Rebs: Birutis, Butkevičius 7 Asts: four players 2 PIR: Evans 25	Boxscore	Pts: Musa 22; Rebs: Tavares 7 Asts: Llull 5 PIR: Musa 16	Arena: Žalgirio Arena; Attendance: 14,646; Referees: Robert Lottermoser, Piotr Pastusiak, Uroš Obrknežević

15 December 2022	Crvena zvezda mts (Basketball Federation of Serbia)	67–71	(Italian Basketball Federation) EA7 Emporio Armani Milan	Belgrade
19:00 (CET)	Scoring by quarter: 16–26, 13–17, 20–14, 18–14
	Pts: Petrušev 20; Rebs: Petrušev 11; Asts: Vildoza 6 PIR: Petrušev 28	Boxscore	Pts: Baron 19; Rebs: Davies, Melli 6 Asts: Davies 7 PIR: Davies 30	Arena: Aleksandar Nikolić Hall; Attendance: 7,469; Referees: Daniel Hierrezuelo, Saulius Račys, Sérgio Silva

15 December 2022	Bayern Munich (German Basketball Federation)	97–92	(Spanish Basketball Federation) Valencia Basket	Munich
20:30 (CET)	Scoring by quarter: 23–26, 20–13, 26–26, 28–27
	Pts: Walden 18; Rebs: Gillespie 8 Asts: Winston, Walden 5 PIR: Walden 21	Boxscore	Pts: Dubljević 28; Rebs: Alexander, Rivero 6 Asts: Harper 8 PIR: Dubljević 28	Arena: Audi Dome; Attendance: 4,377; Referees: Damir Javor, Emin Moğulkoç, Eduard Udyanskyy

15 December 2022	LDLC ASVEL (French Federation of Basketball)	77–75	(Hellenic Basketball Federation) Olympiacos	Villeurbanne
21:00 (CET)	Scoring by quarter: 18–28, 13–19, 19–14, 27–14
	Pts: Mathews, Kahudi 14; Rebs: Tyus, Kahudi 5 Asts: Lighty 5 PIR: Kahudi 18	Boxscore	Pts: Vezenkov 16; Rebs: Bolomboy, Fall 7 Asts: Sloukas 5 PIR: Vezenkov 22	Arena: Astroballe; Attendance: 5,320; Referees: Benjamín Jiménez, Fernando Rocha, Artūras Šukys

16 December 2022	Fenerbahçe Beko (Turkish Basketball Federation)	70–76	(Spanish Basketball Federation) Cazoo Baskonia	Istanbul
18:45 (CET)	Scoring by quarter: 13–21, 20–31, 23–15, 14–9
	Pts: Gudurić 14; Rebs: Calathes 13; Asts: Jekiri 5 PIR: Jekiri 22	Boxscore	Pts: Howard 15; Rebs: Costello 9 Asts: Thompson 9 PIR: Sedekerskis 17	Arena: Ülker Sports and Event Hall; Attendance: 9,174; Referees: Borys Ryzhyk, Gytis Vilius, Milan Nedović

16 December 2022	Virtus Segafredo Bologna (Italian Basketball Federation)	78–73	(Israeli Basketball Association) Maccabi Playtika Tel Aviv	Bologna
20:30 (CET)	Scoring by quarter: 20–16, 24–25, 13–19, 21–13
	Pts: Hackett, Teodosić 15; Rebs: Cordinier, Jaiteh 6 Asts: Teodosić 6 PIR: Teodosić 22	Boxscore	Pts: Brown 18; Rebs: Nebo 10; Asts: Brown 6 PIR: Brown 20	Arena: Segafredo Arena; Attendance: 5,440; Referees: Ilija Belošević, Carlos Cortés, Robert Vyklický

16 December 2022	Partizan Mozzart Bet (Basketball Federation of Serbia)	82–79	(Turkish Basketball Federation) Anadolu Efes	Belgrade
20:30 (CET)	Scoring by quarter: 14–10, 14–27, 25–17, 29–25
	Pts: three players 18; Rebs: Lessort 5 Asts: Nunnally 7 PIR: Punter 26	Boxscore	Pts: Beaubois 30; Rebs: Žižić 9 Asts: Micić 6 PIR: Žižić 33	Arena: Štark Arena; Attendance: 13,776; Referees: Miguel Ángel Pérez, Elias Koromilas, Adar Peer

16 December 2022	Barcelona (Spanish Basketball Federation)	74–68	(Hellenic Basketball Federation) Panathinaikos	Barcelona
20:30 (CET)	Scoring by quarter: 28–12, 15–18, 19–21, 12–17
	Pts: Veselý 15; Rebs: Kalinić, Higgins 5 Asts: Satoranský, Laprovíttola 6 PIR: Veselý 22	Boxscore	Pts: Bacon 19; Rebs: Ponitka, Papagiannis 9 Asts: Lee 4 PIR: Ponitka 20	Arena: Palau Blaugrana; Attendance: 6,072; Referees: Matej Boltauzer, Oļegs Latiševs, Joseph Bissang

16 December 2022	AS Monaco (French Federation of Basketball)	92–89	(German Basketball Federation) ALBA Berlin	Fontvieille
21:00 (CET)	Scoring by quarter: 28–25, 24–19, 20–21, 20–24
	Pts: Diallo 20; Rebs: Hall 8 Asts: James 7 PIR: James 22	Boxscore	Pts: Schneider 15; Rebs: Lammers, Thiemann 6 Asts: Lô, Blatt 5 PIR: Lammers 17	Arena: Salle Gaston Médecin; Attendance: 3,899; Referees: Carmelo Paternicò, Tomasz Trawicki, Mario Majkić

=== Round 15 ===
22 December 2022	Fenerbahçe Beko (Turkish Basketball Federation)	72–73	(Basketball Federation of Serbia) Partizan Mozzart Bet	Istanbul
18:45 (CET)	Scoring by quarter: 19–16, 18–17, 20–18, 15–22
	Pts: Wilbekin 14; Rebs: Hayes, Calathes 7 Asts: Calathes 7 PIR: Hayes 22	Boxscore	Pts: Punter, Lessort 12; Rebs: LeDay, Papapetrou 6 Asts: five players 2 PIR: Punter 17	Arena: Ülker Sports and Event Hall; Attendance: 9,735; Referees: Sreten Radović, Carmelo Paternicò, Emilio Pérez

22 December 2022	Olympiacos (Hellenic Basketball Federation)	86–90	(Basketball Federation of Serbia) Crvena zvezda mts	Piraeus
20:00 (CET)	Scoring by quarter: 22–21, 23–20, 17–24, 24–25
	Pts: Black, Sloukas 14; Rebs: Black, Vezenkov 6 Asts: Sloukas 9 PIR: Sloukas 24	Boxscore	Pts: Vildoza 22; Rebs: Mitrović 7 Asts: Vildoza 8 PIR: Vildoza 29	Arena: Peace and Friendship Stadium; Attendance: 9,787; Referees: Miguel Ángel Pérez, Michele Rossi, Marcin Kowalski

22 December 2022	ALBA Berlin (German Basketball Federation)	70–83	(Israeli Basketball Association) Maccabi Playtika Tel Aviv	Berlin
20:00 (CET)	Scoring by quarter: 21–19, 26–21, 16–21, 7–22
	Pts: Lô 16; Rebs: Sikma 7 Asts: Smith, Sikma 2 PIR: Lô 13	Boxscore	Pts: Martin 21; Rebs: Nebo 13; Asts: Brown 7 PIR: Martin 27	Arena: Mercedes-Benz Arena; Attendance: 9,755; Referees: Oļegs Latiševs, Damir Javor, Igor Dragojević

22 December 2022	Cazoo Baskonia (Spanish Basketball Federation)	90–79	(Italian Basketball Federation) Virtus Segafredo Bologna	Vitoria-Gasteiz
20:30 (CET)	Scoring by quarter: 17–14, 28–17, 18–20, 27–28
	Pts: Marinković 22; Rebs: six players 4 Asts: Henry 13; PIR: Marinković 20	Boxscore	Pts: Belinelli, Shengelia 15; Rebs: Jaiteh 12; Asts: Teodosić 7 PIR: Bako 13	Arena: Buesa Arena; Attendance: 8,054; Referees: Robert Lottermoser, Uroš Nikolić, Luka Kardum

22 December 2022	Real Madrid (Spanish Basketball Federation)	92–73	(French Federation of Basketball) LDLC ASVEL	Madrid
21:00 (CET)	Scoring by quarter: 25–22, 20–12, 25–25, 22–14
	Pts: Poirier 19; Rebs: Poirier 6 Asts: Rodríguez 4 PIR: Poirier 25	Boxscore	Pts: Noua 17; Rebs: Noua 7 Asts: Obasohan 3 PIR: Noua 20	Arena: WiZink Center; Attendance: 7,466; Referees: Ilija Belošević, Emin Moğulkoç, Guido Giovannetti

23 December 2022	Anadolu Efes (Turkish Basketball Federation)	88–69	(Hellenic Basketball Federation) Panathinaikos	Istanbul
18:30 (CET)	Scoring by quarter: 21–13, 21–13, 25–22, 21–21
	Pts: Clyburn 23; Rebs: Clyburn 10; Asts: Micić 8 PIR: Dunston 28	Boxscore	Pts: Bacon 20; Rebs: Papagiannis 7 Asts: Lee 7 PIR: three players 10	Arena: Sinan Erdem Dome; Attendance: 14,942; Referees: Borys Ryzhyk, Milan Nedović, Jakub Zamojski

23 December 2022	Žalgiris (Lithuanian Basketball Federation)	75–67	(German Basketball Federation) Bayern Munich	Kaunas
19:00 (CET)	Scoring by quarter: 26–21, 18–14, 16–13, 15–19
	Pts: Evans 32; Rebs: Butkevičius 10; Asts: Evans 4 PIR: Evans 39	Boxscore	Pts: Walden 18; Rebs: Rubit 9 Asts: Winston 9 PIR: Rubit 24	Arena: Žalgirio Arena; Attendance: 15,254; Referees: Juan Carlos García, Robert Vyklický, Maxime Boubert

23 December 2022	EA7 Emporio Armani Milan (Italian Basketball Federation)	79–71	(French Federation of Basketball) AS Monaco	Assago
20:30 (CET)	Scoring by quarter: 24–21, 10–26, 17–15, 28–9
	Pts: Baron 23; Rebs: Ricci 8 Asts: Davies 4 PIR: Davies 18	Boxscore	Pts: James 24; Rebs: Hall 7 Asts: James 5 PIR: James 17	Arena: Mediolanum Forum; Attendance: 11,400; Referees: Matej Boltauzer, Benjamín Jiménez, Anne Panther

23 December 2022	Valencia Basket (Spanish Basketball Federation)	84–83	(Spanish Basketball Federation) Barcelona	Valencia
20:30 (CET)	Scoring by quarter: 20–20, 21–18, 21–21, 22–24
	Pts: Rivero 16; Rebs: Dubljević 6 Asts: Jones 7 PIR: Rivero 18	Boxscore	Pts: Laprovíttola 28; Rebs: Kalinić 8 Asts: Laprovíttola 7 PIR: Laprovíttola 31	Arena: La Fonteta; Attendance: 7,906; Referees: Mehdi Difallah, Fernando Rocha, Seffi Shemmesh

=== Round 16 ===
29 December 2022	Cazoo Baskonia (Spanish Basketball Federation)	92–86	(Spanish Basketball Federation) Real Madrid	Vitoria-Gasteiz
19:00 (CET)	Scoring by quarter: 24–28, 35–15, 14–26, 19–17
	Pts: Howard 28; Rebs: Thompson 6 Asts: Henry 5 PIR: Giedraitis 26	Boxscore	Pts: Deck 17; Rebs: Tavares 12; Asts: Williams-Goss 5 PIR: Tavares 27	Arena: Buesa Arena; Attendance: 15,504; Referees: Sreten Radović, Ioannis Foufis, Rain Peerandi

29 December 2022	Maccabi Playtika Tel Aviv (Israeli Basketball Association)	80–72	(Turkish Basketball Federation) Anadolu Efes	Tel Aviv
20:05 (CET)	Scoring by quarter: 26–19, 18–26, 13–20, 23–7
	Pts: Brown 23; Rebs: Martin 9 Asts: Brown 7 PIR: Brown 23	Boxscore	Pts: Clyburn 20; Rebs: Clyburn 7 Asts: Micić 7 PIR: Clyburn 26	Arena: Menora Mivtachim Arena; Attendance: 10,432; Referees: Matej Boltauzer, Joseph Bissang, Uroš Nikolić

29 December 2022	Partizan Mozzart Bet (Basketball Federation of Serbia)	83–77	(German Basketball Federation) Bayern Munich	Belgrade
20:30 (CET)	Scoring by quarter: 19–14, 22–15, 18–20, 24–28
	Pts: Exum 19; Rebs: Lessort 11; Asts: Madar, Exum 3 PIR: Lessort 28	Boxscore	Pts: Hunter 16; Rebs: Hunter 14; Asts: Weiler-Babb 4 PIR: Rubit 24	Arena: Štark Arena; Attendance: 17,574; Referees: Oļegs Latiševs, Carlos Cortés, Amit Balak

29 December 2022	EA7 Emporio Armani Milan (Italian Basketball Federation)	90–79	(Spanish Basketball Federation) Valencia Basket	Assago
20:30 (CET)	Scoring by quarter: 29–22, 21–21, 21–17, 19–19
	Pts: Baron 24; Rebs: Hines 6 Asts: Davies 6 PIR: Davies 32	Boxscore	Pts: Dubljević 26; Rebs: Dubljević, Rivero 7 Asts: Harper 7 PIR: Dubljević 27	Arena: Mediolanum Forum; Attendance: 11,422; Referees: Saša Pukl, Jakub Zamojski, Hugues Thépénier

29 December 2022	AS Monaco (French Federation of Basketball)	84–82	(Lithuanian Basketball Federation) Žalgiris	Fontvieille
21:00 (CET)	Scoring by quarter: 17–26, 25–23, 18–15, 24–18
	Pts: Okobo 22; Rebs: Blossomgame, Motiejūnas 6 Asts: Okobo 9 PIR: Okobo 35	Boxscore	Pts: Šmits 18; Rebs: Birutis 7 Asts: Evans 5 PIR: Evans 24	Arena: Salle Gaston Médecin; Attendance: 4,765; Referees: Damir Javor, Emilio Pérez, Vasiliki Tsaroucha

30 December 2022	Crvena zvezda mts (Basketball Federation of Serbia)	94–99(OT)	(Spanish Basketball Federation) Barcelona	Belgrade
19:00 (CET)	Scoring by quarter: 17–28, 23–15, 25–14, 19–27, Overtime: 10–15
	Pts: Petrušev, Nedović 24; Rebs: Petrušev 9 Asts: Nedović 7 PIR: Nedović 30	Boxscore	Pts: Satoranský 19; Rebs: Veselý 5 Asts: Satoranský 10; PIR: Satoranský 28	Arena: Aleksandar Nikolić Hall; Attendance: 7,500; Referees: Robert Lottermoser, Emin Moğulkoç, Aare Halliko

30 December 2022	Panathinaikos (Hellenic Basketball Federation)	71–95	(Hellenic Basketball Federation) Olympiacos	Marousi
20:00 (CET)	Scoring by quarter: 20–26, 16–27, 14–20, 21–22
	Pts: Bacon 30; Rebs: Bacon 6 Asts: Lee 4 PIR: Bacon 23	Boxscore	Pts: Fall 19; Rebs: Fall 9 Asts: Sloukas, Walkup 6 PIR: Fall 33	Arena: OAKA Altion; Attendance: 14,700; Referees: Daniel Hierrezuelo, Mehdi Difallah, Gytis Vilius

30 December 2022	LDLC ASVEL (French Federation of Basketball)	79–91	(German Basketball Federation) ALBA Berlin	Villeurbanne
20:00 (CET)	Scoring by quarter: 27–15, 22–32, 16–26, 14–18
	Pts: Kahudi 14; Rebs: Tyus 9 Asts: three players 3 PIR: Tyus 22	Boxscore	Pts: Smith 21; Rebs: Lammers 9 Asts: Sikma 7 PIR: Smith 27	Arena: Astroballe; Attendance: 5,560; Referees: Borys Ryzhyk, Jordi Aliaga, Seffi Shemmesh

30 December 2022	Virtus Segafredo Bologna (Italian Basketball Federation)	92–88	(Turkish Basketball Federation) Fenerbahçe Beko	Bologna
20:30 (CET)	Scoring by quarter: 23–25, 23–21, 19–22, 27–20
	Pts: Belinelli 18; Rebs: Jaiteh 7 Asts: Pajola 10; PIR: Belinelli 23	Boxscore	Pts: Motley 26; Rebs: Motley, Booker 8 Asts: Calathes, Gudurić 4 PIR: Motley 30	Arena: Segafredo Arena; Attendance: 7,619; Referees: Benjamín Jiménez, Fernando Rocha, Elias Koromilas

=== Round 17 ===
5 January 2023	Žalgiris (Lithuanian Basketball Federation)	86–66	(Turkish Basketball Federation) Fenerbahçe Beko	Kaunas
19:00 (CET)	Scoring by quarter: 21–15, 20–15, 26–10, 19–26
	Pts: Brazdeikis, Dimša 17; Rebs: Šmits, Birutis 6 Asts: Brazdeikis, Birutis 3 PIR: Birutis 27	Boxscore	Pts: Booker 10; Rebs: Birsen 7 Asts: Gudurić 4 PIR: Wilbekin 9	Arena: Žalgirio Arena; Attendance: 15,131; Referees: Mehdi Difallah, Carlos Peruga, Mario Majkić

5 January 2023	ALBA Berlin (German Basketball Federation)	85–84	(Spanish Basketball Federation) Cazoo Baskonia	Berlin
20:00 (CET)	Scoring by quarter: 27–20, 27–28, 23–19, 8–17
	Pts: Smith 18; Rebs: Sikma 8 Asts: Blatt 9 PIR: Blatt 19	Boxscore	Pts: Henry 19; Rebs: Giedraitis, Sedekerskis 6 Asts: Henry, Thompson 5 PIR: Henry 24	Arena: Mercedes-Benz Arena; Attendance: 6,545; Referees: Ilija Belošević, Sérgio Silva, Miloš Koljenšić

5 January 2023	Bayern Munich (German Basketball Federation)	84–68	(Hellenic Basketball Federation) Panathinaikos	Munich
20:30 (CET)	Scoring by quarter: 21–11, 22–17, 18–16, 23–24
	Pts: Rubit 23; Rebs: Gillespie 10; Asts: Winston 4 PIR: Rubit 34	Boxscore	Pts: Bacon 18; Rebs: Gudaitis 5 Asts: Wolters 3 PIR: Williams 11	Arena: Audi Dome; Attendance: 6,500; Referees: Saša Pukl, Milivoje Jovčić, Tomasz Trawicki

5 January 2023	Barcelona (Spanish Basketball Federation)	75–83	(Italian Basketball Federation) Virtus Segafredo Bologna	Barcelona
20:30 (CET)	Scoring by quarter: 15–26, 24–16, 18–18, 18–23
	Pts: Veselý 12; Rebs: da Silva 6 Asts: Laprovíttola 10; PIR: da Silva 18	Boxscore	Pts: Lundberg 20; Rebs: Weems 6 Asts: Teodosić, Shengelia 6 PIR: Lundberg 23	Arena: Palau Blaugrana; Attendance: 5,832; Referees: Sreten Radović, Sašo Petek, Eduard Udyanskyy

5 January 2023	Partizan Mozzart Bet (Basketball Federation of Serbia)	100–80	(French Federation of Basketball) AS Monaco	Belgrade
21:00 (CET)	Scoring by quarter: 26–17, 22–30, 21–21, 31–12
	Pts: Lessort 21; Rebs: Lessort 8 Asts: Punter 4 PIR: Lessort 27	Boxscore	Pts: Okobo 17; Rebs: Motiejūnas, Hall 7 Asts: Okobo 9 PIR: Okobo 22	Arena: Štark Arena; Attendance: 17,883; Referees: Daniel Hierrezuelo, Artūras Šukys, Leandro Lezcano

6 January 2023	Anadolu Efes (Turkish Basketball Federation)	78–72	(French Federation of Basketball) LDLC ASVEL	Istanbul
18:30 (CET)	Scoring by quarter: 17–19, 12–17, 23–22, 26–14
	Pts: Micić 22; Rebs: three players 4 Asts: Beaubois 3 PIR: Clyburn 21	Boxscore	Pts: de Colo, Lighty 12; Rebs: Fall 6 Asts: de Colo 4 PIR: de Colo 13	Arena: Sinan Erdem Dome; Attendance: 11,976; Referees: Anne Panther, Emilio Pérez, Luka Kardum

6 January 2023	Olympiacos (Hellenic Basketball Federation)	82–66	(Italian Basketball Federation) EA7 Emporio Armani Milan	Piraeus
20:00 (CET)	Scoring by quarter: 27–15, 17–23, 15–6, 23–22
	Pts: Peters 16; Rebs: Fall 9 Asts: Sloukas 9 PIR: Peters 20	Boxscore	Pts: Baron 12; Rebs: Ricci 7 Asts: three players 3 PIR: Melli 13	Arena: Peace and Friendship Stadium; Attendance: 11,632; Referees: Oļegs Latiševs, Robert Lottermoser, Rain Peerandi

6 January 2023	Valencia Basket (Spanish Basketball Federation)	75–77	(Basketball Federation of Serbia) Crvena zvezda Meridianbet	Valencia
20:30 (CET)	Scoring by quarter: 19–24, 23–23, 16–14, 17–16
	Pts: Jones 16; Rebs: López-Arostegui 6 Asts: Jones 5 PIR: Jones 19	Boxscore	Pts: Petrušev 25; Rebs: Petrušev 9 Asts: Nedović 6 PIR: Petrušev 36	Arena: La Fonteta; Attendance: 5,627; Referees: Gytis Vilius, Piotr Pastusiak, Kristaps Konstantinovs

6 January 2023	Real Madrid (Spanish Basketball Federation)	98–65	(Israeli Basketball Association) Maccabi Playtika Tel Aviv	Madrid
20:45 (CET)	Scoring by quarter: 22–7, 29–27, 27–15, 20–16
	Pts: Musa, Cornelie 18; Rebs: Yabusele 8 Asts: Rodríguez 6 PIR: Cornelie 24	Boxscore	Pts: Adams 15; Rebs: Nebo 7 Asts: Brown 6 PIR: three players 12	Arena: WiZink Center; Attendance: 9,123; Referees: Borys Ryzhyk, Tomislav Hordov, Hugues Thépénier

=== Round 18 ===
10 January 2023	Crvena zvezda Meridianbet (Basketball Federation of Serbia)	59–79	(Spanish Basketball Federation) Real Madrid	Belgrade
19:00 (CET)	Scoring by quarter: 16–25, 18–13, 17–19, 8–22
	Pts: Nedović 18; Rebs: Marković 6 Asts: Marković 7 PIR: Dobrić 16	Boxscore	Pts: Musa 19; Rebs: Tavares 12; Asts: Rodríguez 7 PIR: Tavares 35	Arena: Aleksandar Nikolić Hall; Attendance: 7,289; Referees: Oļegs Latiševs, Carmelo Paternicò, Tomasz Trawicki

10 January 2023	AS Monaco (French Federation of Basketball)	64–60	(Hellenic Basketball Federation) Olympiacos	Fontvieille
19:00 (CET)	Scoring by quarter: 8–20, 23–14, 15–8, 18–18
	Pts: James 19; Rebs: Motiejūnas 8 Asts: Okobo 7 PIR: Diallo 15	Boxscore	Pts: Peters 12; Rebs: Vezenkov 8 Asts: Walkup 7 PIR: Fall 17	Arena: Salle Gaston Médecin; Attendance: 4,320; Referees: Borys Ryzhyk, Milan Nedović, Amit Balak

10 January 2023	ALBA Berlin (German Basketball Federation)	83–63	(Italian Basketball Federation) EA7 Emporio Armani Milan	Berlin
20:00 (CET)	Scoring by quarter: 20–12, 25–21, 15–18, 23–12
	Pts: Lô 17; Rebs: Lammers 7 Asts: Blatt, Lô 4 PIR: Smith 17	Boxscore	Pts: Luwawu-Cabarrot 16; Rebs: Melli 8 Asts: three players 2 PIR: Luwawu-Cabarrot 16	Arena: Mercedes-Benz Arena; Attendance: 7,128; Referees: Tomislav Hordov, Joseph Bissang, Saulius Račys

10 January 2023	Virtus Segafredo Bologna (Italian Basketball Federation)	77–87	(Lithuanian Basketball Federation) Žalgiris	Bologna
20:30 (CET)	Scoring by quarter: 13–24, 23–16, 24–20, 17–27
	Pts: Teodosić 21; Rebs: Ojeleye 5 Asts: Teodosić 12; PIR: Teodosić 28	Boxscore	Pts: Šmits, Brazdeikis 17; Rebs: Hayes 9 Asts: Šmits 4 PIR: Šmits 26	Arena: Segafredo Arena; Attendance: 5,518; Referees: Daniel Hierrezuelo, Milivoje Jovčić, Hüseyin Çelik

10 January 2023	Bayern Munich (German Basketball Federation)	92–79	(Spanish Basketball Federation) Cazoo Baskonia	Munich
20:30 (CET)	Scoring by quarter: 34–24, 18–20, 23–16, 17–19
	Pts: Winston 16; Rebs: Gillespie 7 Asts: Winston 3 PIR: Hunter, Winston 17	Boxscore	Pts: Howard 21; Rebs: Giedraitis, Sedekerskis 5 Asts: Henry 7 PIR: Howard 17	Arena: Audi Dome; Attendance: 3,817; Referees: Matej Boltauzer, Gytis Vilius, Eduard Udyanskyy

10 January 2023	Panathinaikos (Hellenic Basketball Federation)	88–94(OT)	(Turkish Basketball Federation) Fenerbahçe Beko	Marousi
20:30 (CET)	Scoring by quarter: 19–18, 20–18, 20–15, 19–27, Overtime: 10–16
	Pts: Bacon 27; Rebs: Ponitka 12; Asts: Wolters 4 PIR: Ponitka 26	Boxscore	Pts: Hayes 24; Rebs: Motley 8 Asts: Calathes, Gudurić 5 PIR: Hayes 30	Arena: OAKA Altion; Attendance: 4,180; Referees: Robert Lottermoser, Juan Carlos García, Uroš Nikolić

11 January 2023	LDLC ASVEL (French Federation of Basketball)	75–82	(Spanish Basketball Federation) Barcelona	Villeurbanne
20:00 (CET)	Scoring by quarter: 15–11, 18–31, 27–21, 15–19
	Pts: Fall 23; Rebs: Jackson-Cartwright, Fall 6 Asts: Jackson-Cartwright, Mathews 4 PIR: Fall 31	Boxscore	Pts: Mirotić 19; Rebs: Jokubaitis 5 Asts: Jokubaitis, Higgins 4 PIR: Mirotić 25	Arena: Astroballe; Attendance: 5,560; Referees: Damir Javor, Michele Rossi, Gentian Cici

11 January 2023	Maccabi Playtika Tel Aviv (Israeli Basketball Association)	90–81	(Basketball Federation of Serbia) Partizan Mozzart Bet	Tel Aviv
20:05 (CET)	Scoring by quarter: 24–13, 22–26, 18–14, 26–28
	Pts: Brown 21; Rebs: Colson 7 Asts: Brown 5 PIR: Martin, Colson 21	Boxscore	Pts: Punter 22; Rebs: LeDay 9 Asts: Punter, Avramović 3 PIR: Punter 24	Arena: Menora Mivtachim Arena; Attendance: 10,293; Referees: Anne Panther, Mario Majkić, Piotr Pastusiak

11 January 2023	Valencia Basket (Spanish Basketball Federation)	81–71	(Turkish Basketball Federation) Anadolu Efes	Valencia
20:30 (CET)	Scoring by quarter: 16–13, 15–17, 21–26, 29–15
	Pts: Puerto 15; Rebs: Puerto 7 Asts: Prepelič 6 PIR: Puerto 21	Boxscore	Pts: Clyburn 15; Rebs: three players 6 Asts: Micić 8 PIR: Pleiß, Larkin 17	Arena: La Fonteta; Attendance: 5,042; Referees: Ilija Belošević, Robert Vyklický, Vasiliki Tsaroucha

=== Round 19 ===
12 January 2023	Fenerbahçe Beko (Turkish Basketball Federation)	79–71	(German Basketball Federation) Bayern Munich	Istanbul
18:45 (CET)	Scoring by quarter: 19–18, 27–21, 21–10, 12–22
	Pts: Motley 22; Rebs: Motley 17; Asts: Gudurić, Wilbekin 4 PIR: Motley 38	Boxscore	Pts: Rubit 21; Rebs: Gillespie 8 Asts: Walden 7 PIR: Rubit 26	Arena: Ülker Sports and Event Hall; Attendance: 8,754; Referees: Daniel Hierrezuelo, Artūras Šukys, Luka Kardum

12 January 2023	Crvena zvezda Meridianbet (Basketball Federation of Serbia)	92–68	(French Federation of Basketball) AS Monaco	Belgrade
19:00 (CET)	Scoring by quarter: 23–15, 31–21, 18–14, 20–18
	Pts: Petrušev 21; Rebs: Mitrović, Petrušev 6 Asts: Marković 8 PIR: Petrušev 25	Boxscore	Pts: James 26; Rebs: James, Brown 6 Asts: Diallo, Makoundou 3 PIR: James 32	Arena: Aleksandar Nikolić Hall; Attendance: 7,301; Referees: Juan Carlos García, Sérgio Silva, Seffi Shemmesh

12 January 2023	ALBA Berlin (German Basketball Federation)	77–84	(Spanish Basketball Federation) Real Madrid	Berlin
20:00 (CET)	Scoring by quarter: 12–25, 23–21, 24–20, 18–18
	Pts: Smith 22; Rebs: Koumadje, Sikma 6 Asts: Lô 6 PIR: Smith 21	Boxscore	Pts: Musa 15; Rebs: Tavares 11; Asts: Rodríguez 4 PIR: Tavares 20	Arena: Mercedes-Benz Arena; Attendance: 9,957; Referees: Mehdi Difallah, Jakub Zamojski, Amit Balak

12 January 2023	Virtus Segafredo Bologna (Italian Basketball Federation)	83–85	(Hellenic Basketball Federation) Olympiacos	Bologna
20:30 (CET)	Scoring by quarter: 22–22, 16–20, 15–21, 30–22
	Pts: Teodosić 21; Rebs: Bako, Shengelia 5 Asts: Shengelia 5 PIR: Teodosić, Shengelia 15	Boxscore	Pts: Vezenkov 22; Rebs: Vezenkov 10; Asts: three players 4 PIR: Papanikolaou 26	Arena: Segafredo Arena; Attendance: 6,375; Referees: Matej Boltauzer, Carlos Peruga, Miloš Koljenšić

13 January 2023	Panathinaikos (Hellenic Basketball Federation)	88–86	(Israeli Basketball Association) Maccabi Playtika Tel Aviv	Marousi
20:00 (CET)	Scoring by quarter: 24–17, 21–20, 20–21, 23–28
	Pts: Lee 21; Rebs: Papagiannis, Williams 5 Asts: Bacon, Wolters 3 PIR: Williams 23	Boxscore	Pts: Colson 29; Rebs: Colson 14; Asts: Brown 4 PIR: Colson 41	Arena: OAKA Altion; Attendance: 5,320; Referees: Miguel Ángel Pérez, Ilija Belošević, Damir Javor

13 January 2023	LDLC ASVEL (French Federation of Basketball)	79–83	(Spanish Basketball Federation) Valencia Basket	Villeurbanne
20:00 (CET)	Scoring by quarter: 16–22, 21–30, 23–10, 19–21
	Pts: de Colo 14; Rebs: Kahudi 5 Asts: de Colo 15; PIR: de Colo 21	Boxscore	Pts: López-Arostegui, Radebaugh 13; Rebs: Dubljević 8 Asts: Prepelič 7 PIR: López-Arostegui 21	Arena: Astroballe; Attendance: 5,367; Referees: Robert Lottermoser, Tomasz Trawicki, Sébastien Clivaz

13 January 2023	Partizan Mozzart Bet (Basketball Federation of Serbia)	83–65	(Spanish Basketball Federation) Cazoo Baskonia	Belgrade
20:30 (CET)	Scoring by quarter: 29–17, 18–19, 20–14, 16–15
	Pts: Trifunović 15; Rebs: LeDay, Lessort 5 Asts: Papapetrou 6 PIR: Lessort 20	Boxscore	Pts: Marinković 16; Rebs: Sedekerskis 9 Asts: Kurucs 6 PIR: Sedekerskis 17	Arena: Štark Arena; Attendance: 18,441; Referees: Emin Moğulkoç, Carmelo Paternicò, Vassilis Pitsilkas

13 January 2023	Barcelona (Spanish Basketball Federation)	75–80	(Turkish Basketball Federation) Anadolu Efes	Barcelona
20:30 (CET)	Scoring by quarter: 9–21, 19–18, 20–23, 27–18
	Pts: Higgins 17; Rebs: Veselý, Mirotić 6 Asts: Laprovíttola 5 PIR: Higgins 26	Boxscore	Pts: Micić, Larkin 17; Rebs: Micić, Clyburn 6 Asts: Micić 6 PIR: Micić 27	Arena: Palau Blaugrana; Attendance: 7,437; Referees: Borys Ryzhyk, Oļegs Latiševs, Milan Nedović

13 January 2023	EA7 Emporio Armani Milan (Italian Basketball Federation)	61–66	(Lithuanian Basketball Federation) Žalgiris	Assago
20:30 (CET)	Scoring by quarter: 9–19, 18–18, 13–22, 21–7
	Pts: Baron 11; Rebs: Melli 8 Asts: four players 2 PIR: Hines 10	Boxscore	Pts: Hayes 16; Rebs: Ulanovas 8 Asts: Brazdeikis 3 PIR: Hayes 22	Arena: Mediolanum Forum; Attendance: 7,974; Referees: Sreten Radović, Robert Vyklický, Carlos Cortés

=== Round 20 ===
19 January 2023	Fenerbahçe Beko (Turkish Basketball Federation)	98–94(OT)	(French Federation of Basketball) AS Monaco	Istanbul
18:45 (CET)	Scoring by quarter: 20–20, 19–27, 21–13, 24–24, Overtime: 14–10
	Pts: Wilbekin 21; Rebs: Motley 9 Asts: Calathes 8 PIR: Motley 25	Boxscore	Pts: James 23; Rebs: Diallo 8 Asts: James 6 PIR: Diallo 26	Arena: Ülker Sports and Event Hall; Attendance: 9,052; Referees: Damir Javor, Anne Panther, Emilio Pérez

19 January 2023	Maccabi Playtika Tel Aviv (Israeli Basketball Association)	87–74	(German Basketball Federation) ALBA Berlin	Tel Aviv
20:05 (CET)	Scoring by quarter: 25–10, 13–18, 25–22, 24–24
	Pts: Baldwin 33; Rebs: Nebo 13; Asts: Baldwin 6 PIR: Baldwin 35	Boxscore	Pts: Procida, Smith 12; Rebs: Sikma 6 Asts: Lô 6 PIR: Sikma 13	Arena: Menora Mivtachim Arena; Attendance: 10,151; Referees: Oļegs Latiševs, Gytis Vilius, Eduard Udyanskyy

19 January 2023	Virtus Segafredo Bologna (Italian Basketball Federation)	74–64	(Hellenic Basketball Federation) Panathinaikos	Bologna
20:30 (CET)	Scoring by quarter: 18–11, 25–19, 12–21, 19–13
	Pts: Shengelia 16; Rebs: Hackett, Jaiteh 8 Asts: Shengelia 7 PIR: Shengelia 24	Boxscore	Pts: Wolters 15; Rebs: Williams 7 Asts: Wolters, Lee 3 PIR: Wolters, Williams 17	Arena: Segafredo Arena; Attendance: 6,025; Referees: Borys Ryzhyk, Mehdi Difallah, Uroš Obrknežević

19 January 2023	Cazoo Baskonia (Spanish Basketball Federation)	78–85	(Spanish Basketball Federation) Barcelona	Vitoria-Gasteiz
20:30 (CET)	Scoring by quarter: 28–28, 12–19, 23–17, 15–21
	Pts: Sedekerskis 16; Rebs: Sedekerskis 6 Asts: Thompson 5 PIR: Sedekerskis 23	Boxscore	Pts: Mirotić 15; Rebs: Kalinić 7 Asts: Kalinić, Satoranský 4 PIR: Mirotić 18	Arena: Buesa Arena; Attendance: 10,072; Referees: Saša Pukl, Robert Lottermoser, Jurgis Laurinavičius

19 January 2023	Valencia Basket (Spanish Basketball Federation)	89–81	(Basketball Federation of Serbia) Partizan Mozzart Bet	Valencia
20:45 (CET)	Scoring by quarter: 27–18, 20–19, 22–21, 20–23
	Pts: Dubljević 20; Rebs: Dubljević 6 Asts: Prepelič 5 PIR: Dubljević 25	Boxscore	Pts: Exum 22; Rebs: Trifunović 6 Asts: Punter 4 PIR: Exum, Trifunović 17	Arena: La Fonteta; Attendance: 6,203; Referees: Sreten Radović, Joseph Bissang, Michele Rossi

20 January 2023	Anadolu Efes (Turkish Basketball Federation)	81–89	(German Basketball Federation) Bayern Munich	Istanbul
18:30 (CET)	Scoring by quarter: 21–24, 19–12, 24–23, 17–30
	Pts: Micić 15; Rebs: Bryant 5 Asts: Larkin 7 PIR: Bryant 21	Boxscore	Pts: Hunter 18; Rebs: Hunter 9 Asts: Winston 8 PIR: Hunter 22	Arena: Sinan Erdem Dome; Attendance: 14,510; Referees: Damir Javor, Tomislav Hordov, Maxime Boubert

20 January 2023	Žalgiris (Lithuanian Basketball Federation)	71–66	(Basketball Federation of Serbia) Crvena zvezda Meridianbet	Kaunas
19:00 (CET)	Scoring by quarter: 20–14, 18–16, 12–26, 21–10
	Pts: Ulanovas 13; Rebs: Butkevičius 7 Asts: Ulanovas 6 PIR: Ulanovas 17	Boxscore	Pts: Petrušev 16; Rebs: Kuzmić, Lazarević 6 Asts: Vildoza 4 PIR: Petrušev 17	Arena: Žalgirio Arena; Attendance: 15,272; Referees: Miguel Ángel Pérez, Marcin Kowalski, Rain Peerandi

20 January 2023	Olympiacos (Hellenic Basketball Federation)	73–60	(Spanish Basketball Federation) Real Madrid	Piraeus
20:00 (CET)	Scoring by quarter: 19–15, 17–13, 18–16, 19–16
	Pts: Walkup 18; Rebs: Black 9 Asts: Sloukas 6 PIR: Vezenkov 14	Boxscore	Pts: Musa, Tavares 12; Rebs: Poirier 8 Asts: Hezonja, Causeur 3 PIR: Poirier 12	Arena: Peace and Friendship Stadium; Attendance: 11,427; Referees: Ilija Belošević, Emin Moğulkoç, Robert Vyklický

20 January 2023	EA7 Emporio Armani Milan (Italian Basketball Federation)	73–79	(French Federation of Basketball) LDLC ASVEL	Assago
20:30 (CET)	Scoring by quarter: 17–19, 20–23, 20–15, 16–22
	Pts: Davies 26; Rebs: Luwawu-Cabarrot, Davies 8 Asts: seven players 2 PIR: Davies 31	Boxscore	Pts: Mathews 17; Rebs: Tyus 7 Asts: Bost 6 PIR: Mathews, Tyus 14	Arena: Mediolanum Forum; Attendance: 7,072; Referees: Borys Ryzhyk, Jordi Aliaga, Adar Peer

=== Round 21 ===
26 January 2023	Real Madrid (Spanish Basketball Federation)	91–86(OT)	(Spanish Basketball Federation) Barcelona	Madrid
19:00 (CET)	Scoring by quarter: 16–20, 16–19, 18–20, 23–14, Overtime: 18–13
	Pts: Deck 23; Rebs: Tavares, Deck 7 Asts: Rodríguez 4 PIR: Deck 33	Boxscore	Pts: Mirotić 17; Rebs: Kalinić 7 Asts: Satoranský 7 PIR: Satoranský 17	Arena: WiZink Center; Attendance: 10,305; Referees: Sreten Radović, Joseph Bissang, Tomislav Hordov

26 January 2023	ALBA Berlin (German Basketball Federation)	88–94	(Spanish Basketball Federation) Valencia Basket	Berlin
20:00 (CET)	Scoring by quarter: 25–24, 22–26, 21–17, 20–27
	Pts: Lô 25; Rebs: Thiemann, Zoosman 5 Asts: Blatt, Smith 4 PIR: Lô 30	Boxscore	Pts: Harper 20; Rebs: Pradilla 6 Asts: Jones 6 PIR: Jones 20	Arena: Mercedes-Benz Arena; Attendance: 7,278; Referees: Damir Javor, Rain Peerandi, Leandro Lezcano

26 January 2023	Panathinaikos (Hellenic Basketball Federation)	89–65	(Lithuanian Basketball Federation) Žalgiris	Marousi
21:00 (CET)	Scoring by quarter: 19–24, 8–18, 37–16, 25–7
	Pts: Lee 24; Rebs: Bacon, Papagiannis 5 Asts: Lee 4 PIR: Lee 27	Boxscore	Pts: Šmits 11; Rebs: Hayes 7 Asts: Ulanovas 4 PIR: Šmits, Birutis 11	Arena: OAKA Altion; Attendance: 3,170; Referees: Oļegs Latiševs, Milan Nedović, Carmelo Paternicò

26 January 2023	AS Monaco (French Federation of Basketball)	101–88	(Italian Basketball Federation) EA7 Emporio Armani Milan	Fontvieille
21:00 (CET)	Scoring by quarter: 29–22, 28–28, 23–24, 21–14
	Pts: Okobo 19; Rebs: Hall 8 Asts: James 10; PIR: Okobo 22	Boxscore	Pts: Luwawu-Cabarrot 19; Rebs: Hines 5 Asts: Mitrou-Long 5 PIR: Luwawu-Cabarrot 21	Arena: Salle Gaston Médecin; Attendance: 4,421; Referees: Robert Lottermoser, Emin Moğulkoç, Carlos Peruga

26 January 2023	LDLC ASVEL (French Federation of Basketball)	91–77	(Turkish Basketball Federation) Fenerbahçe Beko	Villeurbanne
21:00 (CET)	Scoring by quarter: 25–12, 23–21, 23–22, 20–22
	Pts: de Colo 26; Rebs: Tyus 6 Asts: Bost 9 PIR: de Colo 30	Boxscore	Pts: Edwards 22; Rebs: Hayes, Gudurić 5 Asts: Edwards, Gudurić 3 PIR: Edwards 19	Arena: Astroballe; Attendance: 5,560; Referees: Miguel Ángel Pérez, Gytis Vilius, Piotr Pastusiak

27 January 2023	Crvena zvezda Meridianbet (Basketball Federation of Serbia)	78–79	(Basketball Federation of Serbia) Partizan Mozzart Bet	Belgrade
19:00 (CET)	Scoring by quarter: 18–20, 19–25, 17–12, 24–22
	Pts: Vildoza 26; Rebs: Petrušev 10; Asts: Mitrović 5 PIR: Vildoza 29	Boxscore	Pts: Exum, LeDay 20; Rebs: Lessort 8 Asts: Exum 5 PIR: Exum, LeDay 22	Arena: Aleksandar Nikolić Hall; Attendance: 8,300; Referees: Borys Ryzhyk, Fernando Rocha, Oļegs Latiševs

27 January 2023	Olympiacos (Hellenic Basketball Federation)	95–89	(Israeli Basketball Association) Maccabi Playtika Tel Aviv	Piraeus
20:00 (CET)	Scoring by quarter: 24–25, 27–11, 20–28, 24–25
	Pts: Vezenkov 23; Rebs: Larentzakis, Vezenkov 9 Asts: Walkup 12; PIR: Vezenkov 28	Boxscore	Pts: Sorkin 23; Rebs: Colson 11; Asts: Baldwin 8 PIR: Sorkin 33	Arena: Peace and Friendship Stadium; Attendance: 11,440; Referees: Juan Carlos García, Sašo Petek, Luka Kardum

27 January 2023	Cazoo Baskonia (Spanish Basketball Federation)	114–111(OT)	(Turkish Basketball Federation) Anadolu Efes	Vitoria-Gasteiz
20:30 (CET)	Scoring by quarter: 29–28, 19–23, 22–26, 28–21, Overtime: 16–13
	Pts: Costello 33; Rebs: Giedraitis 18; Asts: Thompson 16; PIR: Thompson 36	Boxscore	Pts: Larkin 21; Rebs: three players 5 Asts: Larkin 6 PIR: Larkin 26	Arena: Buesa Arena; Attendance: 10,156; Referees: Sreten Radović, Anne Panther, Mehdi Difallah

27 January 2023	Bayern Munich (German Basketball Federation)	91–84	(Italian Basketball Federation) Virtus Segafredo Bologna	Munich
20:45 (CET)	Scoring by quarter: 22–18, 21–20, 23–17, 25–29
	Pts: Rubit 18; Rebs: Gillespie 9 Asts: Winston 4 PIR: Rubit 21	Boxscore	Pts: Teodosić, Cordinier 14; Rebs: Mickey 5 Asts: Teodosić 9 PIR: Hackett 15	Arena: Audi Dome; Attendance: 6,500; Referees: Saša Pukl, Emilio Pérez, Hugues Thépénier

=== Round 22 ===
31 January 2023	Fenerbahçe Beko (Turkish Basketball Federation)	73–93	(Hellenic Basketball Federation) Olympiacos	Istanbul
18:45 (CET)	Scoring by quarter: 10–24, 20–27, 21–26, 22–16
	Pts: Gudurić 24; Rebs: Antetokounmpo 7 Asts: Calathes, Gudurić 4 PIR: Gudurić 21	Boxscore	Pts: Papanikolaou 21; Rebs: Vezenkov 12; Asts: Walkup 7 PIR: Papanikolaou 22	Arena: Ülker Sports and Event Hall; Attendance: 11,709; Referees: Robert Lottermoser, Joseph Bissang, Carlos Cortés

31 January 2023	EA7 Emporio Armani Milan (Italian Basketball Federation)	89–83	(Spanish Basketball Federation) Cazoo Baskonia	Assago
19:00 (CET)	Scoring by quarter: 18–17, 22–17, 22–26, 27–23
	Pts: Luwawu-Cabarrot 17; Rebs: Voigtmann 8 Asts: Baron 5 PIR: Voigtmann 20	Boxscore	Pts: Thompson 19; Rebs: Hommes, Giedraitis 6 Asts: Hommes 4 PIR: Giedraitis 24	Arena: Mediolanum Forum; Attendance: 6,900; Referees: Ilija Belošević, Gytis Vilius, Gentian Cici

31 January 2023	Valencia Basket (Spanish Basketball Federation)	82–73	(German Basketball Federation) Bayern Munich	Valencia
20:30 (CET)	Scoring by quarter: 16–14, 17–18, 28–24, 21–17
	Pts: Radebaugh 14; Rebs: Claver, Radebaugh 5 Asts: Evans 4 PIR: Radebaugh 20	Boxscore	Pts: Winston 22; Rebs: Gillespie 6 Asts: Winston 5 PIR: Winston 26	Arena: La Fonteta; Attendance: 6,029; Referees: Oļegs Latiševs, Fernando Rocha, Robert Vyklický

31 January 2023	Partizan Mozzart Bet (Basketball Federation of Serbia)	92–71	(French Federation of Basketball) LDLC ASVEL	Belgrade
20:30 (CET)	Scoring by quarter: 25–16, 25–20, 26–15, 16–20
	Pts: Punter 22; Rebs: LeDay 7 Asts: three players 2 PIR: Punter 24	Boxscore	Pts: Fall, Pons 14; Rebs: Fall, Pons 6 Asts: Bost 3 PIR: Fall, Pons 14	Arena: Štark Arena; Attendance: 17,353; Referees: Juan Carlos García, Sérgio Silva, Rain Peerandi

31 January 2023	Barcelona (Spanish Basketball Federation)	83–78	(Israeli Basketball Association) Maccabi Playtika Tel Aviv	Barcelona
20:30 (CET)	Scoring by quarter: 20–15, 21–22, 21–30, 21–11
	Pts: Higgins 15; Rebs: Mirotić 9 Asts: Satoranský 5 PIR: Higgins 20	Boxscore	Pts: Adams 20; Rebs: Martin 6 Asts: Baldwin 6 PIR: Adams 20	Arena: Palau Blaugrana; Attendance: 6,843; Referees: Milivoje Jovčić, Anne Panther, Mehdi Difallah

31 January 2023	Virtus Segafredo Bologna (Italian Basketball Federation)	84–72	(Basketball Federation of Serbia) Crvena zvezda Meridianbet	Bologna
21:00 (CET)	Scoring by quarter: 30–14, 18–21, 22–16, 14–21
	Pts: Shengelia 15; Rebs: Jaiteh, Mickey 8 Asts: Teodosić 9 PIR: Shengelia 19	Boxscore	Pts: Vildoza 20; Rebs: Ilić 7 Asts: Vildoza, Bentil 3 PIR: Vildoza 20	Arena: Segafredo Arena; Attendance: 7,756; Referees: Daniel Hierrezuelo, Emin Moğulkoç, Eduard Udyanskyy

1 February 2023	Anadolu Efes (Turkish Basketball Federation)	80–70	(Lithuanian Basketball Federation) Žalgiris	Istanbul
18:30 (CET)	Scoring by quarter: 16–16, 22–12, 17–21, 25–21
	Pts: Clyburn 19; Rebs: Clyburn 7 Asts: Micić 5 PIR: Clyburn 27	Boxscore	Pts: Brazdeikis 25; Rebs: Hayes 6 Asts: Brazdeikis, Šmits 3 PIR: Brazdeikis 23	Arena: Sinan Erdem Dome; Attendance: 14,032; Referees: Matej Boltauzer, Emilio Pérez, Adar Peer

1 February 2023	ALBA Berlin (German Basketball Federation)	84–102	(French Federation of Basketball) AS Monaco	Berlin
20:00 (CET)	Scoring by quarter: 24–22, 12–29, 18–22, 30–29
	Pts: Wetzell 17; Rebs: Sikma 5 Asts: Sikma 4 PIR: Koumadje, Wetzell 15	Boxscore	Pts: Motiejūnas 22; Rebs: Hall 6 Asts: James, Okobo 6 PIR: Motiejūnas 25	Arena: Mercedes-Benz Arena; Attendance: 9,098; Referees: Borys Ryzhyk, Michele Rossi, Luka Kardum

1 February 2023	Real Madrid (Spanish Basketball Federation)	83–68	(Hellenic Basketball Federation) Panathinaikos	Madrid
20:45 (CET)	Scoring by quarter: 26–14, 22–16, 20–27, 15–11
	Pts: Yabusele 16; Rebs: Tavares 9 Asts: three players 3 PIR: Yabusele 21	Boxscore	Pts: Lee 17; Rebs: Gudaitis 7 Asts: Lee, Bacon 3 PIR: Grigonis 14	Arena: WiZink Center; Attendance: 6,876; Referees: Milivoje Jovčić, Piotr Pastusiak, Josip Radojković

=== Round 23 ===
2 February 2023	Valencia Basket (Spanish Basketball Federation)	93–94	(Israeli Basketball Association) Maccabi Playtika Tel Aviv	Valencia
20:30 (CET)	Scoring by quarter: 28–24, 27–21, 23–34, 15–15
	Pts: Harper 20; Rebs: Alexander 5 Asts: Evans, Prepelič 4 PIR: Harper 21	Boxscore	Pts: Baldwin 19; Rebs: Colson 12; Asts: Baldwin 4 PIR: Colson 32	Arena: La Fonteta; Attendance: 7,141; Referees: Robert Lottermoser, Uroš Nikolić, Saulius Račys

2 February 2023	EA7 Emporio Armani Milan (Italian Basketball Federation)	74–68	(Basketball Federation of Serbia) Crvena zvezda Meridianbet	Assago
20:30 (CET)	Scoring by quarter: 22–18, 23–14, 14–17, 15–19
	Pts: Baron 15; Rebs: Luwawu-Cabarrot 6 Asts: Napier 5 PIR: Baron 18	Boxscore	Pts: Bentil 17; Rebs: Bentil 7 Asts: Marković 5 PIR: Bentil 19	Arena: Mediolanum Forum; Attendance: 9,165; Referees: Juan Carlos García, Mehdi Difallah, Amit Balak

2 February 2023	Barcelona (Spanish Basketball Federation)	72–70	(German Basketball Federation) Bayern Munich	Barcelona
20:30 (CET)	Scoring by quarter: 21–14, 13–19, 17–14, 21–23
	Pts: Mirotić 12; Rebs: Veselý 9 Asts: Satoranský 5 PIR: Jokubaitis, Veselý 16	Boxscore	Pts: Weiler-Babb 15; Rebs: Rubit, Wimberg 5 Asts: Walden 3 PIR: Weiler-Babb 16	Arena: Palau Blaugrana; Attendance: 5,668; Referees: Ilija Belošević, Emin Moğulkoç, Mario Majkić

3 February 2023	Fenerbahçe Beko (Turkish Basketball Federation)	101–86	(German Basketball Federation) ALBA Berlin	Istanbul
18:45 (CET)	Scoring by quarter: 31–27, 26–20, 24–14, 20–25
	Pts: Hayes 24; Rebs: Hayes 11; Asts: Pierre 4 PIR: Hayes 37	Boxscore	Pts: Wetzell 13; Rebs: Koumadje 9 Asts: Blatt 8 PIR: three players 13	Arena: Ülker Sports and Event Hall; Attendance: 8,758; Referees: Sreten Radović, Carlos Peruga, Uroš Obrknežević

3 February 2023	Žalgiris (Lithuanian Basketball Federation)	74–88	(Basketball Federation of Serbia) Partizan Mozzart Bet	Kaunas
19:00 (CET)	Scoring by quarter: 15–26, 15–21, 24–14, 20–27
	Pts: Brazdeikis 17; Rebs: Hayes, Ulanovas 4 Asts: Ulanovas 5 PIR: Brazdeikis 19	Boxscore	Pts: Papapetrou 17; Rebs: LeDay 10; Asts: Avramović, Trifunović 4 PIR: Papapetrou 17	Arena: Žalgirio Arena; Attendance: 15,037; Referees: Daniel Hierrezuelo, Sašo Petek, Guido Giovannetti

3 February 2023	AS Monaco (French Federation of Basketball)	91–95	(Spanish Basketball Federation) Real Madrid	Fontvieille
19:00 (CET)	Scoring by quarter: 20–24, 26–26, 25–20, 20–25
	Pts: James 23; Rebs: Hall 6 Asts: James 7 PIR: James 24	Boxscore	Pts: Hezonja 30; Rebs: Deck 9 Asts: Hezonja 6 PIR: Hezonja 34	Arena: Salle Gaston Médecin; Attendance: 4,899; Referees: Saša Pukl, Oļegs Latiševs, Gytis Vilius

3 February 2023	Olympiacos (Hellenic Basketball Federation)	76–70	(Turkish Basketball Federation) Anadolu Efes	Piraeus
20:00 (CET)	Scoring by quarter: 22–13, 19–18, 18–21, 17–18
	Pts: Vezenkov 23; Rebs: Walkup, Lountzis 7 Asts: Papanikolaou 6 PIR: Vezenkov 21	Boxscore	Pts: four players 10; Rebs: Dunston 6 Asts: Larkin 5 PIR: Dunston 14	Arena: Peace and Friendship Stadium; Attendance: 11,345; Referees: Borys Ryzhyk, Miguel Ángel Pérez, Milan Nedović

3 February 2023	Cazoo Baskonia (Spanish Basketball Federation)	95–90	(Hellenic Basketball Federation) Panathinaikos	Vitoria-Gasteiz
20:30 (CET)	Scoring by quarter: 21–23, 31–15, 24–27, 19–25
	Pts: Howard 24; Rebs: Giedraitis, Sedekerskis 8 Asts: Thompson 10; PIR: Howard 18	Boxscore	Pts: Williams 19; Rebs: Papagiannis 7 Asts: Lee 8 PIR: Papagiannis, Williams 19	Arena: Buesa Arena; Attendance: 9,118; Referees: Matej Boltauzer, Tomislav Hordov, Tomasz Trawicki

3 February 2023	LDLC ASVEL (French Federation of Basketball)	64–77	(Italian Basketball Federation) Virtus Segafredo Bologna	Villeurbanne
21:00 (CET)	Scoring by quarter: 14–21, 23–18, 11–16, 16–22
	Pts: de Colo 15; Rebs: Bost 7 Asts: de Colo 6 PIR: de Colo 20	Boxscore	Pts: Belinelli 21; Rebs: Cordinier, Bako 5 Asts: Cordinier 5 PIR: Cordinier 18	Arena: Astroballe; Attendance: 5,560; Referees: Damir Javor, Milivoje Jovčić, Vasiliki Tsaroucha

=== Round 24 ===
8 February 2023	ALBA Berlin (German Basketball Federation)	60–93	(Hellenic Basketball Federation) Olympiacos	Berlin
20:00 (CET)	Scoring by quarter: 13–28, 22–17, 10–28, 15–20
	Pts: Olinde 16; Rebs: Smith, Thiemann 3 Asts: Zoosman 5 PIR: Olinde 12	Boxscore	Pts: Vezenkov 28; Rebs: Vezenkov 13; Asts: Walkup 10; PIR: Vezenkov 40	Arena: Mercedes-Benz Arena; Attendance: 8,829; Referees: Daniel Hierrezuelo, Uroš Nikolić, Robert Vyklický

9 February 2023	Maccabi Playtika Tel Aviv (Israeli Basketball Association)	86–89	(Basketball Federation of Serbia) Crvena zvezda Meridianbet	Tel Aviv
20:05 (CET)	Scoring by quarter: 18–18, 16–26, 21–25, 31–20
	Pts: Baldwin 38; Rebs: Colson, Baldwin 5 Asts: Baldwin 5 PIR: Baldwin 39	Boxscore	Pts: Nedović 28; Rebs: Mitrović 6 Asts: Ivanović 7 PIR: Nedović 24	Arena: Menora Mivtachim Arena; Attendance: 10,416; Referees: Miguel Ángel Pérez, Artūras Šukys, Sébastien Clivaz

9 February 2023	Virtus Segafredo Bologna (Italian Basketball Federation)	75–92	(Spanish Basketball Federation) Barcelona	Bologna
20:30 (CET)	Scoring by quarter: 17–22, 10–25, 12–27, 36–18
	Pts: Jaiteh 14; Rebs: Jaiteh 5 Asts: Mannion 6 PIR: Lundberg 18	Boxscore	Pts: Mirotić 17; Rebs: Kalinić, Veselý 5 Asts: Satoranský 6 PIR: Mirotić 21	Arena: Segafredo Arena; Attendance: 9,028; Referees: Robert Lottermoser, Milan Nedović, Adar Peer

9 February 2023	Bayern Munich (German Basketball Federation)	71–82	(Basketball Federation of Serbia) Partizan Mozzart Bet	Munich
20:30 (CET)	Scoring by quarter: 19–19, 14–20, 12–21, 26–22
	Pts: Seeley 11; Rebs: Gillespie 8 Asts: Rubit, Seeley 2 PIR: Gillespie 14	Boxscore	Pts: Punter 19; Rebs: Lessort 7 Asts: Exum 5 PIR: Punter 19	Arena: Audi Dome; Attendance: 6,398; Referees: Matej Boltauzer, Mehdi Difallah, Alberto Baena

10 February 2023	Žalgiris (Lithuanian Basketball Federation)	79–75	(Spanish Basketball Federation) Cazoo Baskonia	Kaunas
19:00 (CET)	Scoring by quarter: 20–18, 18–24, 23–18, 18–15
	Pts: Šmits 20; Rebs: Butkevičius 6 Asts: Ulanovas 5 PIR: Ulanovas 26	Boxscore	Pts: Howard 15; Rebs: Enoch 9 Asts: Thompson 6 PIR: Enoch 15	Arena: Žalgirio Arena; Attendance: 14,879; Referees: Borys Ryzhyk, Milivoje Jovčić, Rain Peerandi

10 February 2023	AS Monaco (French Federation of Basketball)	87–75	(French Federation of Basketball) LDLC ASVEL	Fontvieille
19:00 (CET)	Scoring by quarter: 28–21, 22–19, 17–23, 20–12
	Pts: Loyd 16; Rebs: Motiejūnas, Hall 5 Asts: James 7 PIR: Diallo 21	Boxscore	Pts: Obasohan 11; Rebs: Noua 7 Asts: Bost 8 PIR: Bost 14	Arena: Salle Gaston Médecin; Attendance: 4,201; Referees: Sreten Radović, Anne Panther, Amit Balak

10 February 2023	Panathinaikos (Hellenic Basketball Federation)	91–92	(Spanish Basketball Federation) Valencia Basket	Marousi
20:00 (CET)	Scoring by quarter: 26–21, 23–21, 19–27, 23–23
	Pts: Lee 25; Rebs: Gudaitis 10; Asts: Lee 7 PIR: Gudaitis 32	Boxscore	Pts: Jones 24; Rebs: López-Arostegui, Webb 5 Asts: Jones 5 PIR: Jones 33	Arena: OAKA Altion; Attendance: 5,150; Referees: Gytis Vilius, Sašo Petek, Joseph Bissang

14 March 2023	Anadolu Efes (Turkish Basketball Federation)	90–89	(Spanish Basketball Federation) Real Madrid	Istanbul
18:30 (CET)	Scoring by quarter: 18–24, 24–15, 35–21, 13–29
	Pts: Larkin 18; Rebs: Clyburn 7 Asts: Larkin 8 PIR: Bryant 23	Boxscore	Pts: Musa 16; Rebs: Poirier 7 Asts: Musa 5 PIR: Tavares 21	Arena: Sinan Erdem Dome; Attendance: 15,077; Referees: Ilija Belošević, Carmelo Paternicò, Mario Majkić
Note: The game, originally scheduled for 9 February 2023, was postponed due to the 2023 Turkey–Syria earthquakes.

21 March 2023	Fenerbahçe Beko (Turkish Basketball Federation)	75–82	(Italian Basketball Federation) EA7 Emporio Armani Milan	Istanbul
18:15 (CET)	Scoring by quarter: 18–23, 17–14, 17–24, 23–21
	Pts: Motley 22; Rebs: Motley 9 Asts: Calathes, Gudurić 3 PIR: Motley 31	Boxscore	Pts: Napier 26; Rebs: Voigtmann 8 Asts: Baron 4 PIR: Napier 26	Arena: Ülker Sports and Event Hall; Attendance: 9,125; Referees: Daniel Hierrezuelo, Oļegs Latiševs, Rain Peerandi
Note: The game, originally scheduled for 10 February 2023, was postponed due to the 2023 Turkey–Syria earthquakes.

=== Round 25 ===
23 February 2023	Maccabi Playtika Tel Aviv (Israeli Basketball Association)	90–82	(German Basketball Federation) Bayern Munich	Tel Aviv
20:05 (CET)	Scoring by quarter: 18–18, 21–26, 22–23, 29–15
	Pts: Brown 27; Rebs: Colson, Baldwin 8 Asts: Baldwin 8 PIR: Brown 33	Boxscore	Pts: Walden 19; Rebs: Bonga 8 Asts: Walden 4 PIR: Walden 19	Arena: Menora Mivtachim Arena; Attendance: 10,382; Referees: Juan Carlos García, Sašo Petek, Jakub Zamojski

23 February 2023	EA7 Emporio Armani Milan (Italian Basketball Federation)	78–76	(Hellenic Basketball Federation) Panathinaikos	Assago
20:30 (CET)	Scoring by quarter: 20–21, 20–18, 24–21, 14–16
	Pts: Napier, Davies 16; Rebs: Melli 7 Asts: Napier 5 PIR: Davies 21	Boxscore	Pts: Williams 21; Rebs: Ponitka 6 Asts: Lee 6 PIR: Williams 25	Arena: Mediolanum Forum; Attendance: 8,219; Referees: Daniel Hierrezuelo, Milan Nedović, Uroš Nikolić

23 February 2023	Real Madrid (Spanish Basketball Federation)	96–69	(Lithuanian Basketball Federation) Žalgiris	Madrid
20:45 (CET)	Scoring by quarter: 22–24, 31–14, 23–14, 20–17
	Pts: Musa 17; Rebs: Poirier 8 Asts: Rodríguez 6 PIR: Musa 20	Boxscore	Pts: Brazdeikis 16; Rebs: Polonara 6 Asts: four players 2 PIR: Brazdeikis 14	Arena: WiZink Center; Attendance: 7,783; Referees: Robert Lottermoser, Joseph Bissang, Eduard Udyanskyy

23 February 2023	Partizan Mozzart Bet (Basketball Federation of Serbia)	94–97	(Turkish Basketball Federation) Fenerbahçe Beko	Belgrade
21:00 (CET)	Scoring by quarter: 22–22, 24–25, 23–21, 25–29
	Pts: Punter 25; Rebs: Lessort 11; Asts: Madar 4 PIR: Lessort 30	Boxscore	Pts: Gudurić 25; Rebs: Pierre 6 Asts: Gudurić 7 PIR: Gudurić 35	Arena: Štark Arena; Attendance: 19,661; Referees: Miguel Ángel Pérez, Borys Ryzhyk, Gytis Vilius

24 February 2023	Crvena zvezda Meridianbet (Basketball Federation of Serbia)	72–87	(German Basketball Federation) ALBA Berlin	Belgrade
19:00 (CET)	Scoring by quarter: 25–15, 19–24, 17–21, 11–27
	Pts: Petrušev 14; Rebs: Lazarević 4 Asts: Nedović 5 PIR: Mitrović 10	Boxscore	Pts: Lô 24; Rebs: Olinde 7 Asts: Sikma 6 PIR: Lô 27	Arena: Aleksandar Nikolić Hall; Attendance: 6,752; Referees: Fernando Rocha, Ioannis Foufis, Jurgis Laurinavičius

24 February 2023	LDLC ASVEL (French Federation of Basketball)	89–90	(Turkish Basketball Federation) Anadolu Efes	Villeurbanne
20:00 (CET)	Scoring by quarter: 18–23, 31–22, 12–27, 28–18
	Pts: de Colo 20; Rebs: Fall 5 Asts: Bost 6 PIR: de Colo 26	Boxscore	Pts: Clyburn 20; Rebs: Bryant 10; Asts: Larkin 5 PIR: Clyburn 24	Arena: Astroballe; Attendance: 5,379; Referees: Saša Pukl, Seffi Shemmesh, Artūras Šukys

24 February 2023	Virtus Segafredo Bologna (Italian Basketball Federation)	88–83	(Spanish Basketball Federation) Cazoo Baskonia	Bologna
20:30 (CET)	Scoring by quarter: 16–19, 28–22, 24–21, 20–21
	Pts: Teodosić 17; Rebs: Jaiteh 6 Asts: Teodosić 7 PIR: Teodosić 22	Boxscore	Pts: Giedraitis 25; Rebs: Marinković 8 Asts: Thompson, Kotsar 4 PIR: Giedraitis 31	Arena: Segafredo Arena; Attendance: 7,504; Referees: Oļegs Latiševs, Mehdi Difallah, Mario Majkić

24 February 2023	Valencia Basket (Spanish Basketball Federation)	85–92	(Hellenic Basketball Federation) Olympiacos	Valencia
20:30 (CET)	Scoring by quarter: 25–15, 20–20, 13–30, 27–27
	Pts: Prepelič 21; Rebs: Dubljević 4 Asts: Jones 6 PIR: Prepelič 23	Boxscore	Pts: Papanikolaou 22; Rebs: Fall, Vezenkov 7 Asts: Sloukas 9 PIR: Papanikolaou 24	Arena: La Fonteta; Attendance: 7,172; Referees: Damir Javor, Milivoje Jovčić, Emin Moğulkoç

24 February 2023	Barcelona (Spanish Basketball Federation)	80–70	(French Federation of Basketball) AS Monaco	Barcelona
20:45 (CET)	Scoring by quarter: 24–18, 26–21, 15–18, 15–13
	Pts: Satoranský 15; Rebs: Veselý 7 Asts: Laprovíttola, Veselý 3 PIR: Veselý 20	Boxscore	Pts: James 14; Rebs: Diallo 5 Asts: James, Loyd 3 PIR: James, Diallo 15	Arena: Palau Blaugrana; Attendance: 6,840; Referees: Matej Boltauzer, Tomislav Hordov, Piotr Pastusiak

=== Round 26 ===
2 March 2023	Bayern Munich (German Basketball Federation)	87–80	(Basketball Federation of Serbia) Crvena zvezda Meridianbet	Munich
19:00 (CET)	Scoring by quarter: 19–23, 22–15, 11–18, 35–24
	Pts: Winston, Lučić 20; Rebs: Gillespie 9 Asts: Weiler-Babb, Obst 3 PIR: Winston, Lučić 16	Boxscore	Pts: Vildoza 18; Rebs: Lazarević 7 Asts: Campazzo 7 PIR: Nedović 21	Arena: Audi Dome; Attendance: 6,388; Referees: Oļegs Latiševs, Carlos Peruga, Tomasz Trawicki

2 March 2023	Barcelona (Spanish Basketball Federation)	93–74	(Lithuanian Basketball Federation) Žalgiris	Barcelona
19:00 (CET)	Scoring by quarter: 19–17, 27–19, 31–18, 16–20
	Pts: Mirotić 28; Rebs: Kalinić 5 Asts: three players 5 PIR: Mirotić 27	Boxscore	Pts: Brazdeikis 15; Rebs: three players 4 Asts: Butkevičius 4 PIR: Birutis 17	Arena: Palau Blaugrana; Attendance: 5,545; Referees: Damir Javor, Anne Panther, Luka Kardum

2 March 2023	Panathinaikos (Hellenic Basketball Federation)	82–87	(Turkish Basketball Federation) Anadolu Efes	Marousi
20:00 (CET)	Scoring by quarter: 21–18, 19–25, 14–21, 28–23
	Pts: Grigonis 23; Rebs: Ponitka 6 Asts: Grigonis 4 PIR: Grigonis 23	Boxscore	Pts: Clyburn 24; Rebs: three players 7 Asts: Larkin 10; PIR: Clyburn 32	Arena: OAKA Altion; Attendance: 3,620; Referees: Sreten Radović, Milivoje Jovčić, Emilio Pérez

2 March 2023	Partizan Mozzart Bet (Basketball Federation of Serbia)	88–74	(German Basketball Federation) ALBA Berlin	Belgrade
21:00 (CET)	Scoring by quarter: 20–19, 22–25, 35–9, 11–21
	Pts: Avramović 19; Rebs: Lessort 6 Asts: Madar 5 PIR: Lessort 18	Boxscore	Pts: Lô 17; Rebs: Koumadje 10; Asts: Smith 6 PIR: Koumadje 22	Arena: Štark Arena; Attendance: 17,009; Referees: Juan Carlos García, Carmelo Paternicò, Adar Peer

2 March 2023	AS Monaco (French Federation of Basketball)	86–67	(Israeli Basketball Association) Maccabi Playtika Tel Aviv	Fontvieille
21:00 (CET)	Scoring by quarter: 30–17, 9–19, 19–23, 28–8
	Pts: Loyd 18; Rebs: Hall 10; Asts: James 6 PIR: Loyd 26	Boxscore	Pts: Baldwin 17; Rebs: Nebo 10; Asts: Baldwin, Brown 3 PIR: Baldwin 22	Arena: Salle Gaston Médecin; Attendance: 4,567; Referees: Daniel Hierrezuelo, Milan Nedović, Robert Vyklický

3 March 2023	Fenerbahçe Beko (Turkish Basketball Federation)	104–72	(Italian Basketball Federation) Virtus Segafredo Bologna	Istanbul
18:45 (CET)	Scoring by quarter: 31–14, 27–15, 27–23, 19–20
	Pts: Pierre 20; Rebs: Birsen 9 Asts: Calathes 8 PIR: Pierre 22	Boxscore	Pts: Belinelli 18; Rebs: Ojeleye 6 Asts: Shengelia, Teodosić 5 PIR: Belinelli 20	Arena: Ülker Sports and Event Hall; Attendance: 9,236; Referees: Ilija Belošević, Sašo Petek, Rain Peerandi

3 March 2023	LDLC ASVEL (French Federation of Basketball)	71–75	(Spanish Basketball Federation) Real Madrid	Villeurbanne
20:00 (CET)	Scoring by quarter: 10–20, 22–27, 22–16, 17–12
	Pts: de Colo, Mathews 13; Rebs: Fall 9 Asts: three players 3 PIR: Tyus 12	Boxscore	Pts: Causeur 14; Rebs: Tavares 7 Asts: Deck, Rodríguez 3 PIR: Causeur 23	Arena: Astroballe; Attendance: 5,436; Referees: Borys Ryzhyk, Piotr Pastusiak, Mario Majkić

3 March 2023	Cazoo Baskonia (Spanish Basketball Federation)	114–75	(Spanish Basketball Federation) Valencia Basket	Vitoria-Gasteiz
20:30 (CET)	Scoring by quarter: 27–24, 30–24, 24–16, 33–11
	Pts: Hommes 24; Rebs: Costello 8 Asts: Thompson 11; PIR: Hommes 31	Boxscore	Pts: Harper 15; Rebs: Webb 4 Asts: Jones 4 PIR: Harper 13	Arena: Buesa Arena; Attendance: 8,566; Referees: Saša Pukl, Fernando Rocha, Maxime Boubert

3 March 2023	EA7 Emporio Armani Milan (Italian Basketball Federation)	83–62	(Hellenic Basketball Federation) Olympiacos	Assago
20:30 (CET)	Scoring by quarter: 20–17, 15–15, 26–14, 22–16
	Pts: Baron 18; Rebs: Tonut 6 Asts: Baron 5 PIR: Baron 23	Boxscore	Pts: Vezenkov, Walkup 10; Rebs: Vezenkov 6 Asts: Sloukas, Walkup 5 PIR: Vezenkov 18	Arena: Mediolanum Forum; Attendance: 10,463; Referees: Robert Lottermoser, Tomislav Hordov, Carlos Cortés

=== Round 27 ===
7 March 2023	Olympiacos (Hellenic Basketball Federation)	77–70	(Spanish Basketball Federation) Barcelona	Piraeus
20:00 (CET)	Scoring by quarter: 11–20, 18–7, 21–18, 27–25
	Pts: McKissic 16; Rebs: Fall, Vezenkov 7 Asts: McKissic 4 PIR: McKissic 16	Boxscore	Pts: Mirotić 19; Rebs: Mirotić 7 Asts: Laprovíttola 8 PIR: Mirotić 21	Arena: Peace and Friendship Stadium; Attendance: 11,425; Referees: Ilija Belošević, Mehdi Difallah, Sašo Petek

7 March 2023	ALBA Berlin (German Basketball Federation)	63–66	(Lithuanian Basketball Federation) Žalgiris	Berlin
20:00 (CET)	Scoring by quarter: 14–15, 13–18, 18–11, 18–22
	Pts: three players 10; Rebs: Sikma 10; Asts: Lô 3 PIR: Sikma 20	Boxscore	Pts: Taylor 14; Rebs: Polonara 9 Asts: Lekavičius 5 PIR: Polonara 16	Arena: Mercedes-Benz Arena; Attendance: 8,113; Referees: Saša Pukl, Oļegs Latiševs, Michele Rossi

7 March 2023	Virtus Segafredo Bologna (Italian Basketball Federation)	79–88	(Basketball Federation of Serbia) Partizan Mozzart Bet	Bologna
20:30 (CET)	Scoring by quarter: 26–28, 21–17, 16–20, 16–23
	Pts: Jaiteh 14; Rebs: Mickey 9 Asts: Teodosić 12; PIR: Mickey 25	Boxscore	Pts: Nunnally 18; Rebs: LeDay 8 Asts: Exum 7 PIR: Exum 33	Arena: Segafredo Arena; Attendance: 9,072; Referees: Daniel Hierrezuelo, Joseph Bissang, Gentian Cici

7 March 2023	Valencia Basket (Spanish Basketball Federation)	84–88	(Italian Basketball Federation) EA7 Emporio Armani Milan	Valencia
20:30 (CET)	Scoring by quarter: 21–17, 21–22, 13–26, 29–23
	Pts: Jones 19; Rebs: Dubljević 6 Asts: Prepelič 5 PIR: Puerto, Jones 15	Boxscore	Pts: Napier 28; Rebs: Melli 7 Asts: Napier, Voigtmann 5 PIR: Napier 28	Arena: La Fonteta; Attendance: 6,314; Referees: Matej Boltauzer, Anne Panther, Sérgio Silva

7 March 2023	Real Madrid (Spanish Basketball Federation)	81–85	(Spanish Basketball Federation) Cazoo Baskonia	Madrid
20:45 (CET)	Scoring by quarter: 22–17, 21–23, 22–22, 16–23
	Pts: Musa 21; Rebs: Musa 8 Asts: Rodríguez 8 PIR: Musa 26	Boxscore	Pts: Costello 20; Rebs: Kotsar 6 Asts: Thompson 14; PIR: Thompson 32	Arena: WiZink Center; Attendance: 7,286; Referees: Damir Javor, Emin Moğulkoç, Gytis Vilius

7 March 2023	Bayern Munich (German Basketball Federation)	76–72	(French Federation of Basketball) LDLC ASVEL	Munich
21:00 (CET)	Scoring by quarter: 21–19, 17–17, 15–14, 23–22
	Pts: Obst 15; Rebs: Giffey 9 Asts: Weiler-Babb 4 PIR: Giffey 16	Boxscore	Pts: Bost 18; Rebs: Fall 7 Asts: Diot, Lighty 5 PIR: Bost 18	Arena: Audi Dome; Attendance: 5,831; Referees: Miguel Ángel Pérez, Uroš Nikolić, Kristaps Konstantinovs

8 March 2023	Maccabi Playtika Tel Aviv (Israeli Basketball Association)	78–74	(Turkish Basketball Federation) Fenerbahçe Beko	Tel Aviv
18:30 (CET)	Scoring by quarter: 17–25, 26–14, 18–17, 17–18
	Pts: Brown 21; Rebs: Colson 7 Asts: Brown, DiBartolomeo 3 PIR: DiBartolomeo 21	Boxscore	Pts: Hayes 16; Rebs: Pierre 8 Asts: Calathes 4 PIR: Pierre 18	Arena: Menora Mivtachim Arena; Attendance: 10,128; Referees: Milivoje Jovčić, Jordi Aliaga, Luka Kardum

8 March 2023	Crvena zvezda Meridianbet (Basketball Federation of Serbia)	94–75	(Turkish Basketball Federation) Anadolu Efes	Belgrade
20:30 (CET)	Scoring by quarter: 20–25, 29–20, 19–22, 26–8
	Pts: Campazzo 22; Rebs: Lazarević, Mitrović 4 Asts: Campazzo 7 PIR: Campazzo 30	Boxscore	Pts: Žižić 16; Rebs: Clyburn 9 Asts: Tuncer 6 PIR: Clyburn 21	Arena: Aleksandar Nikolić Hall; Attendance: 6,064; Referees: Robert Lottermoser, Juan Carlos García, Piotr Pastusiak

8 March 2023	AS Monaco (French Federation of Basketball)	84–70	(Hellenic Basketball Federation) Panathinaikos	Fontvieille
21:00 (CET)	Scoring by quarter: 21–17, 21–19, 22–21, 20–13
	Pts: Loyd, Diallo 18; Rebs: Diallo 8 Asts: Okobo 4 PIR: Diallo 24	Boxscore	Pts: Ponitka 11; Rebs: Ponitka 6 Asts: Lee 3 PIR: Ponitka 16	Arena: Salle Gaston Médecin; Attendance: 3,999; Referees: Borys Ryzhyk, Fernando Rocha, Artūras Šukys

=== Round 28 ===
9 March 2023	ALBA Berlin (German Basketball Federation)	74–96	(Italian Basketball Federation) Virtus Segafredo Bologna	Berlin
18:00 (CET)	Scoring by quarter: 14–22, 19–27, 26–28, 15–19
	Pts: Smith 12; Rebs: Sikma 6 Asts: Smith 7 PIR: Sikma 23	Boxscore	Pts: Weems 22; Rebs: Jaiteh 8 Asts: three players 6 PIR: Weems, Teodosić 20	Arena: Mercedes-Benz Arena; Attendance: 8,255; Referees: Damir Javor, Gytis Vilius, Jakub Zamojski

9 March 2023	Žalgiris (Lithuanian Basketball Federation)	85–67	(French Federation of Basketball) LDLC ASVEL	Kaunas
19:00 (CET)	Scoring by quarter: 16–22, 31–15, 18–13, 20–17
	Pts: Brazdeikis 19; Rebs: Birutis 7 Asts: Taylor 3 PIR: Polonara 20	Boxscore	Pts: Mathews 18; Rebs: Tyus 4 Asts: Obasohan 4 PIR: Mathews 17	Arena: Žalgirio Arena; Attendance: 14,719; Referees: Daniel Hierrezuelo, Milan Nedović, Gentian Cici

9 March 2023	Olympiacos (Hellenic Basketball Federation)	102–74	(German Basketball Federation) Bayern Munich	Piraeus
20:00 (CET)	Scoring by quarter: 26–12, 29–23, 26–30, 21–9
	Pts: Vezenkov 18; Rebs: three players 5 Asts: Walkup, Sloukas 5 PIR: Vezenkov 22	Boxscore	Pts: Bonga 16; Rebs: Gillespie 6 Asts: three players 4 PIR: Bonga 24	Arena: Peace and Friendship Stadium; Attendance: 10,087; Referees: Sreten Radović, Matej Boltauzer, Maxime Boubert

9 March 2023	EA7 Emporio Armani Milan (Italian Basketball Federation)	76–62	(Basketball Federation of Serbia) Partizan Mozzart Bet	Assago
20:30 (CET)	Scoring by quarter: 13–19, 17–10, 19–17, 27–16
	Pts: Baron, Davies 14; Rebs: Melli 8 Asts: Pangos 7 PIR: Pangos 19	Boxscore	Pts: Punter 15; Rebs: Lessort 6 Asts: Punter, Exum 3 PIR: Lessort 17	Arena: Mediolanum Forum; Attendance: 10,281; Referees: Oļegs Latiševs, Emilio Pérez, Hugues Thépénier

9 March 2023	Real Madrid (Spanish Basketball Federation)	95–91	(Spanish Basketball Federation) Valencia Basket	Madrid
20:45 (CET)	Scoring by quarter: 24–20, 25–20, 22–25, 24–26
	Pts: Deck 18; Rebs: Cornelie, Deck 7 Asts: Rodríguez 7 PIR: Deck 26	Boxscore	Pts: Jones 19; Rebs: Radebaugh 4 Asts: Prepelič 6 PIR: Jones 26	Arena: WiZink Center; Attendance: 6,381; Referees: Mehdi Difallah, Amit Balak, Guido Giovannetti

10 March 2023	Anadolu Efes (Turkish Basketball Federation)	64–86	(Israeli Basketball Association) Maccabi Playtika Tel Aviv	Istanbul
18:30 (CET)	Scoring by quarter: 20–33, 13–21, 15–14, 16–18
	Pts: Clyburn 12; Rebs: Clyburn 8 Asts: Bryant 3 PIR: Dunston 18	Boxscore	Pts: Baldwin 23; Rebs: Nebo 11; Asts: Brown 8 PIR: Nebo 22	Arena: Sinan Erdem Dome; Attendance: 11,673; Referees: Borys Ryzhyk, Tomislav Hordov, Rain Peerandi

10 March 2023	Fenerbahçe Beko (Turkish Basketball Federation)	81–73	(Spanish Basketball Federation) Barcelona	Istanbul
18:45 (CET)	Scoring by quarter: 18–30, 19–10, 24–16, 20–17
	Pts: Motley 16; Rebs: four players 4 Asts: Calathes, Wilbekin 4 PIR: Hayes, Motley 17	Boxscore	Pts: Mirotić 19; Rebs: Veselý 9 Asts: Satoranský 4 PIR: Mirotić 17	Arena: Ülker Sports and Event Hall; Attendance: 12,106; Referees: Saša Pukl, Fernando Rocha, Uroš Nikolić

10 March 2023	Panathinaikos (Hellenic Basketball Federation)	75–66	(Basketball Federation of Serbia) Crvena zvezda Meridianbet	Marousi
20:00 (CET)	Scoring by quarter: 9–17, 20–25, 23–13, 23–11
	Pts: Papagiannis 17; Rebs: Papagiannis 7 Asts: Lee 5 PIR: Papagiannis 22	Boxscore	Pts: Petrušev, Nedović 12; Rebs: Petrušev 9 Asts: Vildoza, Campazzo 4 PIR: Nedović 13	Arena: OAKA Altion; Attendance: 3,853; Referees: Miguel Ángel Pérez, Emin Moğulkoç, Joseph Bissang

10 March 2023	Cazoo Baskonia (Spanish Basketball Federation)	93–102	(French Federation of Basketball) AS Monaco	Vitoria-Gasteiz
20:30 (CET)	Scoring by quarter: 28–23, 19–29, 26–22, 20–28
	Pts: Howard, Thompson 20; Rebs: Giedraitis 7 Asts: Thompson 12; PIR: Thompson 28	Boxscore	Pts: Loyd 19; Rebs: Moneke 13; Asts: Okobo 4 PIR: Moneke 26	Arena: Buesa Arena; Attendance: 9,165; Referees: Robert Lottermoser, Ilija Belošević, Sašo Petek

=== Round 29 ===
16 March 2023	Anadolu Efes (Turkish Basketball Federation)	84–97	(Basketball Federation of Serbia) Partizan Mozzart Bet	Istanbul
18:30 (CET)	Scoring by quarter: 23–11, 14–28, 27–24, 20–34
	Pts: Clyburn 22; Rebs: Clyburn 8 Asts: Larkin 6 PIR: Clyburn 25	Boxscore	Pts: Punter 19; Rebs: Lessort 7 Asts: Exum 6 PIR: Lessort 23	Arena: Sinan Erdem Dome; Attendance: 13,292; Referees: Miguel Ángel Pérez, Robert Vyklický, Ioannis Foufis

16 March 2023	Žalgiris (Lithuanian Basketball Federation)	72–74	(Hellenic Basketball Federation) Olympiacos	Kaunas
19:00 (CET)	Scoring by quarter: 17–15, 17–25, 15–21, 23–13
	Pts: Šmits 18; Rebs: Polonara 8 Asts: Ulanovas 6 PIR: Šmits 14	Boxscore	Pts: Vezenkov 25; Rebs: Vezenkov 8 Asts: Fall, Walkup 7 PIR: Vezenkov 32	Arena: Žalgirio Arena; Attendance: 14,861; Referees: Borys Ryzhyk, Juan Carlos García, Leandro Lezcano

16 March 2023	AS Monaco (French Federation of Basketball)	81–68	(Italian Basketball Federation) Virtus Segafredo Bologna	Fontvieille
19:00 (CET)	Scoring by quarter: 21–22, 20–15, 22–16, 18–15
	Pts: Okobo 21; Rebs: Brown, Hall 7 Asts: Diallo 6 PIR: Okobo 27	Boxscore	Pts: Mickey 14; Rebs: Mickey 4 Asts: Teodosić 8 PIR: Mickey 17	Arena: Salle Gaston Médecin; Attendance: 4,631; Referees: Sreten Radović, Anne Panther, Emin Moğulkoç

16 March 2023	Maccabi Playtika Tel Aviv (Israeli Basketball Association)	93–79	(Spanish Basketball Federation) Cazoo Baskonia	Tel Aviv
20:05 (CET)	Scoring by quarter: 29–23, 20–22, 23–20, 21–14
	Pts: Baldwin 24; Rebs: Nebo 14; Asts: Baldwin 8 PIR: Baldwin 31	Boxscore	Pts: Giedraitis 18; Rebs: Kotsar 9 Asts: Thompson 7 PIR: Kotsar 22	Arena: Menora Mivtachim Arena; Attendance: 9,936; Referees: Oļegs Latiševs, Uroš Nikolić, Mario Majkić

16 March 2023	Valencia Basket (Spanish Basketball Federation)	82–80	(Turkish Basketball Federation) Fenerbahçe Beko	Valencia
20:30 (CET)	Scoring by quarter: 22–21, 21–21, 18–18, 21–20
	Pts: Dubljević 18; Rebs: Webb, Dubljević 7 Asts: Jones 4 PIR: Dubljević 21	Boxscore	Pts: Gudurić 23; Rebs: Hayes 6 Asts: Gudurić 5 PIR: Gudurić 23	Arena: La Fonteta; Attendance: 5,509; Referees: Robert Lottermoser, Tomislav Hordov, Adar Peer

16 March 2023	Real Madrid (Spanish Basketball Federation)	91–87	(Italian Basketball Federation) EA7 Emporio Armani Milan	Madrid
20:45 (CET)	Scoring by quarter: 24–23, 18–17, 25–26, 24–21
	Pts: Musa 27; Rebs: Tavares 8 Asts: Rodríguez 7 PIR: Musa 38	Boxscore	Pts: Napier 17; Rebs: Melli 7 Asts: Napier 8 PIR: Napier 24	Arena: WiZink Center; Attendance: 7,114; Referees: Saša Pukl, Fernando Rocha, Luka Kardum

16 March 2023	LDLC ASVEL (French Federation of Basketball)	82–86	(Hellenic Basketball Federation) Panathinaikos	Villeurbanne
21:00 (CET)	Scoring by quarter: 26–20, 17–32, 19–18, 20–16
	Pts: Fall 13; Rebs: Fall 12; Asts: de Colo 7 PIR: Fall 28	Boxscore	Pts: Lee 14; Rebs: Bacon 6 Asts: Lee 4 PIR: Lee, Bacon 19	Arena: Astroballe; Attendance: 5,393; Referees: Matej Boltauzer, Rain Peerandi, Jordi Aliaga

17 March 2023	Bayern Munich (German Basketball Federation)	75–76	(German Basketball Federation) ALBA Berlin	Munich
20:30 (CET)	Scoring by quarter: 14–20, 23–18, 21–18, 17–20
	Pts: Winston 14; Rebs: Gillespie 9 Asts: Winston 8 PIR: Winston 17	Boxscore	Pts: Lô 16; Rebs: Sikma 7 Asts: Blatt 7 PIR: Lô, Sikma 19	Arena: Audi Dome; Attendance: 6,401; Referees: Ilija Belošević, Mehdi Difallah, Milan Nedović

17 March 2023	Barcelona (Spanish Basketball Federation)	85–79	(Basketball Federation of Serbia) Crvena zvezda Meridianbet	Barcelona
20:30 (CET)	Scoring by quarter: 18–15, 22–21, 17–21, 28–22
	Pts: Mirotić, Veselý 21; Rebs: Veselý 6 Asts: Jokubaitis 8 PIR: Mirotić 24	Boxscore	Pts: Campazzo 24; Rebs: Bentil 7 Asts: Campazzo 4 PIR: Campazzo 24	Arena: Palau Blaugrana; Attendance: 7,160; Referees: Sreten Radović, Carmelo Paternicò, Amit Balak

=== Round 30 ===
23 March 2023	Crvena zvezda Meridianbet (Basketball Federation of Serbia)	74–63	(Spanish Basketball Federation) Cazoo Baskonia	Belgrade
19:00 (CET)	Scoring by quarter: 21–26, 18–12, 18–11, 17–14
	Pts: Nedović 20; Rebs: Petrušev 9 Asts: Campazzo 7 PIR: Mitrović 16	Boxscore	Pts: Thompson 15; Rebs: Enoch, Costello 6 Asts: Thompson, Costello 6 PIR: Thompson 19	Arena: Aleksandar Nikolić Hall; Attendance: 5,893; Referees: Mehdi Difallah, Fernando Rocha, Anne Panther

23 March 2023	Panathinaikos (Hellenic Basketball Federation)	74–88	(Spanish Basketball Federation) Barcelona	Marousi
19:30 (CET)	Scoring by quarter: 25–22, 11–21, 24–25, 14–20
	Pts: Papagiannis 19; Rebs: Papagiannis 7 Asts: Lee 4 PIR: Papagiannis 23	Boxscore	Pts: Mirotić 26; Rebs: Kalinić, Satoranský 9 Asts: Satoranský 9 PIR: Mirotić, Satoranský 26	Arena: OAKA Altion; Attendance: 4,830; Referees: Oļegs Latiševs, Milan Nedović, Luka Kardum

23 March 2023	LDLC ASVEL (French Federation of Basketball)	67–85	(Israeli Basketball Association) Maccabi Playtika Tel Aviv	Villeurbanne
20:00 (CET)	Scoring by quarter: 22–22, 21–24, 16–22, 8–17
	Pts: de Colo 13; Rebs: Fall 5 Asts: de Colo 4 PIR: Fall 17	Boxscore	Pts: Baldwin 23; Rebs: Nebo 9 Asts: Baldwin 7 PIR: Baldwin 26	Arena: Astroballe; Attendance: 5,347; Referees: Sreten Radović, Carlos Peruga, Vasiliki Tsaroucha

23 March 2023	ALBA Berlin (German Basketball Federation)	95–93	(Turkish Basketball Federation) Anadolu Efes	Berlin
20:00 (CET)	Scoring by quarter: 24–21, 25–19, 19–27, 27–26
	Pts: Smith 25; Rebs: Olinde 7 Asts: Sikma 8 PIR: Smith 23	Boxscore	Pts: Micić 30; Rebs: Clyburn, Žižić 6 Asts: Larkin 5 PIR: Micić 26	Arena: Mercedes-Benz Arena; Attendance: 8,996; Referees: Daniel Hierrezuelo, Matej Boltauzer, Hugues Thépénier

24 March 2023	Fenerbahçe Beko (Turkish Basketball Federation)	87–79	(Lithuanian Basketball Federation) Žalgiris	Istanbul
18:45 (CET)	Scoring by quarter: 22–16, 24–19, 19–20, 22–24
	Pts: N. Hayes 19; Rebs: N. Hayes 6 Asts: Calathes 6 PIR: N. Hayes 26	Boxscore	Pts: Šmits 18; Rebs: K. Hayes 9 Asts: Taylor 9 PIR: K. Hayes 21	Arena: Ülker Sports and Event Hall; Attendance: 7,932; Referees: Ilija Belošević, Emilio Pérez, Ioannis Foufis

24 March 2023	Virtus Segafredo Bologna (Italian Basketball Federation)	79–96	(Spanish Basketball Federation) Real Madrid	Bologna
19:00 (CET)	Scoring by quarter: 12–26, 21–24, 25–18, 21–28
	Pts: Belinelli 26; Rebs: Shengelia, Mickey 6 Asts: Mannion 5 PIR: Belinelli 28	Boxscore	Pts: Hezonja 26; Rebs: Tavares 8 Asts: Rodríguez 5 PIR: Yabusele 30	Arena: Segafredo Arena; Attendance: 8,273; Referees: Tomislav Hordov, Uroš Nikolić, Seffi Shemmesh

24 March 2023	AS Monaco (French Federation of Basketball)	90–79	(Spanish Basketball Federation) Valencia Basket	Fontvieille
19:00 (CET)	Scoring by quarter: 22–22, 26–19, 23–23, 19–15
	Pts: Blossomgame, Okobo 14; Rebs: Hall 13; Asts: Okobo 7 PIR: Hall 26	Boxscore	Pts: Jones 17; Rebs: Dubljević 11; Asts: three players 3 PIR: Jones 26	Arena: Salle Gaston Médecin; Attendance: 4,333; Referees: Saša Pukl, Carmelo Paternicò, Sébastien Clivaz

24 March 2023	Partizan Mozzart Bet (Basketball Federation of Serbia)	90–75	(Hellenic Basketball Federation) Olympiacos	Belgrade
20:00 (CET)	Scoring by quarter: 27–22, 21–12, 12–18, 30–23
	Pts: Nunnally 19; Rebs: Lessort 10; Asts: Nunnally 5 PIR: Lessort 26	Boxscore	Pts: McKissic 21; Rebs: Fall 6 Asts: Walkup 9 PIR: McKissic 23	Arena: Štark Arena; Attendance: 20,003; Referees: Robert Lottermoser, Emin Moğulkoç, Gytis Vilius

24 March 2023	EA7 Emporio Armani Milan (Italian Basketball Federation)	99–74	(German Basketball Federation) Bayern Munich	Assago
21:00 (CET)	Scoring by quarter: 25–8, 24–28, 23–18, 27–20
	Pts: Napier 20; Rebs: Voigtmann, Melli 6 Asts: Napier 4 PIR: Napier 27	Boxscore	Pts: Obst 27; Rebs: Gillespie 5 Asts: Obst, Weiler-Babb 3 PIR: Obst 24	Arena: Mediolanum Forum; Attendance: 9,218; Referees: Juan Carlos García, Damir Javor, Artūras Šukys

=== Round 31 ===
28 March 2023	Maccabi Playtika Tel Aviv (Israeli Basketball Association)	111–80	(Italian Basketball Federation) Virtus Segafredo Bologna	Tel Aviv
18:00 (CEST)	Scoring by quarter: 28–13, 34–20, 25–20, 24–27
	Pts: Hilliard 16; Rebs: Colson, Hilliard 4 Asts: Brown 8 PIR: Baldwin, Brown 23	Boxscore	Pts: Ojeleye 16; Rebs: Jaiteh 4 Asts: Mannion 7 PIR: Ojeleye 16	Arena: Menora Mivtachim Arena; Attendance: 10,209; Referees: Ilija Belošević, Emilio Pérez, Maxime Boubert

28 March 2023	Panathinaikos (Hellenic Basketball Federation)	86–76	(German Basketball Federation) Bayern Munich	Marousi
19:30 (CEST)	Scoring by quarter: 21–27, 27–16, 23–11, 15–22
	Pts: Papagiannis 24; Rebs: Papagiannis 11; Asts: Lee 11; PIR: Papagiannis 40	Boxscore	Pts: Obst, Weiler-Babb 12; Rebs: Cheatham 7 Asts: Obst 6 PIR: Cheatham 14	Arena: OAKA Altion; Attendance: 2,340; Referees: Tomislav Hordov, Carlos Peruga, Sašo Petek

28 March 2023	Anadolu Efes (Turkish Basketball Federation)	89–69	(Italian Basketball Federation) EA7 Emporio Armani Milan	Istanbul
19:30 (CEST)	Scoring by quarter: 22–16, 25–16, 21–16, 21–21
	Pts: Larkin 18; Rebs: Bryant 7 Asts: Larkin 5 PIR: Clyburn 25	Boxscore	Pts: Luwawu-Cabarrot 19; Rebs: Luwawu-Cabarrot 6 Asts: Davies, Napier 4 PIR: Luwawu-Cabarrot 18	Arena: Sinan Erdem Dome; Attendance: 10,032; Referees: Robert Lottermoser, Mehdi Difallah, Uroš Nikolić

28 March 2023	Cazoo Baskonia (Spanish Basketball Federation)	93–87	(German Basketball Federation) ALBA Berlin	Vitoria-Gasteiz
20:30 (CEST)	Scoring by quarter: 25–24, 19–24, 24–19, 25–20
	Pts: Kotsar 23; Rebs: Kotsar 10; Asts: Thompson 11; PIR: Kotsar 40	Boxscore	Pts: Lô 15; Rebs: Wetzell 8 Asts: Sikma 6 PIR: Wetzell 21	Arena: Buesa Arena; Attendance: 7,847; Referees: Saša Pukl, Luka Kardum, Adar Peer

28 March 2023	Partizan Mozzart Bet (Basketball Federation of Serbia)	80–89	(Spanish Basketball Federation) Barcelona	Belgrade
20:30 (CEST)	Scoring by quarter: 21–25, 24–19, 13–22, 22–23
	Pts: Exum 24; Rebs: Lessort 6 Asts: Punter 2 PIR: Exum 25	Boxscore	Pts: Laprovíttola 25; Rebs: Mirotić 8 Asts: Laprovíttola 7 PIR: Laprovíttola 32	Arena: Štark Arena; Attendance: 20,041; Referees: Borys Ryzhyk, Anne Panther, Seffi Shemmesh

29 March 2023	Žalgiris (Lithuanian Basketball Federation)	79–70	(French Federation of Basketball) AS Monaco	Kaunas
18:00 (CEST)	Scoring by quarter: 28–19, 20–22, 17–12, 14–17
	Pts: Brazdeikis 22; Rebs: Hayes, Brazdeikis 5 Asts: Butkevičius 5 PIR: Brazdeikis 17	Boxscore	Pts: Loyd, Motiejūnas 13; Rebs: three players 5 Asts: Loyd 5 PIR: Loyd 26	Arena: Žalgirio Arena; Attendance: 14,923; Referees: Matej Boltauzer, Amit Balak, Jordi Aliaga

29 March 2023	Crvena zvezda Meridianbet (Basketball Federation of Serbia)	92–73	(Spanish Basketball Federation) Valencia Basket	Belgrade
19:00 (CEST)	Scoring by quarter: 20–21, 26–20, 23–21, 23–11
	Pts: Petrušev 20; Rebs: Petrušev 7 Asts: Vildoza, Campazzo 7 PIR: Petrušev 26	Boxscore	Pts: Radebaugh 14; Rebs: Dubljević 6 Asts: Jones 5 PIR: Jones 16	Arena: Aleksandar Nikolić Hall; Attendance: 6,538; Referees: Mehdi Difallah, Piotr Pastusiak, Seffi Shemmesh

29 March 2023	Olympiacos (Hellenic Basketball Federation)	81–55	(French Federation of Basketball) LDLC ASVEL	Piraeus
20:00 (CEST)	Scoring by quarter: 22–13, 15–16, 19–10, 25–16
	Pts: McKissic, Walkup 11; Rebs: Bolomboy, Peters 7 Asts: Walkup 7 PIR: Walkup 17	Boxscore	Pts: Obasohan 12; Rebs: Fall 8 Asts: Diot 4 PIR: Tyus 16	Arena: Peace and Friendship Stadium; Attendance: 8,345; Referees: Damir Javor, Carmelo Paternicò, Marko Juras

29 March 2023	Real Madrid (Spanish Basketball Federation)	90–75	(Turkish Basketball Federation) Fenerbahçe Beko	Madrid
20:45 (CEST)	Scoring by quarter: 24–21, 25–23, 19–14, 22–17
	Pts: Musa 16; Rebs: Deck 8 Asts: Hanga 7 PIR: Musa 25	Boxscore	Pts: Hayes 17; Rebs: Calathes, Jekiri 6 Asts: Calathes 6 PIR: Hayes 21	Arena: WiZink Center; Attendance: 9,523; Referees: Sreten Radović, Gytis Vilius, Milan Nedović

=== Round 32 ===
30 March 2023	Anadolu Efes (Turkish Basketball Federation)	86–67	(Italian Basketball Federation) Virtus Segafredo Bologna	Istanbul
19:30 (CEST)	Scoring by quarter: 13–13, 23–14, 24–11, 26–29
	Pts: Žižić 24; Rebs: Bryant 11; Asts: Micić 11; PIR: Žižić 26	Boxscore	Pts: Mannion 17; Rebs: Ojeleye 7 Asts: Mannion 6 PIR: Mannion 20	Arena: Sinan Erdem Dome; Attendance: 10,792; Referees: Saša Pukl, Luka Kardum, Sébastien Clivaz

30 March 2023	Maccabi Playtika Tel Aviv (Israeli Basketball Association)	85–66	(Italian Basketball Federation) EA7 Emporio Armani Milan	Tel Aviv
20:05 (CEST)	Scoring by quarter: 29–21, 24–15, 13–20, 19–10
	Pts: Sorkin 18; Rebs: Nebo 10; Asts: Brown 8 PIR: Brown 20	Boxscore	Pts: Napier 15; Rebs: Davies 6 Asts: Napier 4 PIR: Napier 21	Arena: Menora Mivtachim Arena; Attendance: 10,456; Referees: Borys Ryzhyk, Tomislav Hordov, Sašo Petek

30 March 2023	Barcelona (Spanish Basketball Federation)	72–56	(German Basketball Federation) ALBA Berlin	Barcelona
20:30 (CEST)	Scoring by quarter: 19–21, 15–14, 16–7, 22–14
	Pts: Şanlı 12; Rebs: Mirotić, Şanlı 6 Asts: Jokubaitis 5 PIR: Şanlı 20	Boxscore	Pts: Wetzell 9 Rebs: Sikma 7 Asts: Sikma 4 PIR: Olinde 12	Arena: Palau Blaugrana; Attendance: 6,309; Referees: Sreten Radović, Joseph Bissang, Vassiliki Tsaroucha

31 March 2023	Bayern Munich (German Basketball Federation)	81–84	(French Federation of Basketball) AS Monaco	Munich
19:00 (CEST)	Scoring by quarter: 22–23, 18–22, 20–12, 21–27
	Pts: Lučić 20; Rebs: Bonga, Gillespie 6 Asts: Weiler-Babb 5 PIR: Walden 20	Boxscore	Pts: James 28; Rebs: Brown 6 Asts: five players 3 PIR: James 25	Arena: Audi Dome; Attendance: 6,500; Referees: Miguel Ángel Pérez, Gytis Vilius, Uroš Obrknežević

31 March 2023	Žalgiris (Lithuanian Basketball Federation)	95–74	(Spanish Basketball Federation) Valencia Basket	Kaunas
19:00 (CEST)	Scoring by quarter: 21–16, 31–24, 25–17, 18–17
	Pts: Lekavičius 16; Rebs: Polonara 8 Asts: Polonara 6 PIR: Butkevičius 21	Boxscore	Pts: Webb 18; Rebs: Webb, Rivero 6 Asts: Harper 9 PIR: Rivero 23	Arena: Žalgirio Arena; Attendance: 15,195; Referees: Damir Javor, Emin Moğulkoç, Fernando Rocha

31 March 2023	Partizan Mozzart Bet (Basketball Federation of Serbia)	104–90	(Spanish Basketball Federation) Real Madrid	Belgrade
20:30 (CEST)	Scoring by quarter: 21–23, 28–15, 29–34, 26–18
	Pts: Punter, Lessort 16; Rebs: Lessort 8 Asts: Punter 6 PIR: Lessort 29	Boxscore	Pts: Musa 22; Rebs: Deck 7 Asts: Rodríguez 5 PIR: Musa, Deck 23	Arena: Štark Arena; Attendance: 20,068; Referees: Carmelo Paternicò, Piotr Pastusiak, Saulius Račys

31 March 2023	Cazoo Baskonia (Spanish Basketball Federation)	92–69	(Turkish Basketball Federation) Fenerbahçe Beko	Vitoria-Gasteiz
20:30 (CEST)	Scoring by quarter: 25–27, 13–17, 22–14, 32–11
	Pts: Marinković 35; Rebs: Costello 12; Asts: Thompson, Costello 4 PIR: Marinković 29	Boxscore	Pts: Motley 18; Rebs: Bjelica 5 Asts: four players 2 PIR: Motley 16	Arena: Buesa Arena; Attendance: 11,324; Referees: Matej Boltauzer, Milivoje Jovčić, Amit Balak

31 March 2023	Olympiacos (Hellenic Basketball Federation)	81–73	(Hellenic Basketball Federation) Panathinaikos	Piraeus
20:30 (CEST)	Scoring by quarter: 16–17, 17–21, 24–10, 24–25
	Pts: Black 21; Rebs: Walkup 7 Asts: Walkup 13; PIR: Walkup 32	Boxscore	Pts: Lee 15; Rebs: Gudaitis 6 Asts: Bacon, Lee 5 PIR: Gudaitis 19	Arena: Peace and Friendship Stadium; Attendance: 11,345; Referees: Ilija Belošević, Mehdi Difallah, Emilio Pérez

31 March 2023	LDLC ASVEL (French Federation of Basketball)	60–76	(Basketball Federation of Serbia) Crvena zvezda Meridianbet	Villeurbanne
21:00 (CEST)	Scoring by quarter: 19–17, 23–20, 11–19, 7–20
	Pts: de Colo 14; Rebs: Tyus 9 Asts: Bost, de Colo 3 PIR: de Colo 20	Boxscore	Pts: Dobrić 18; Rebs: Petrušev 7 Asts: Vildoza 8 PIR: Campazzo 20	Arena: Astroballe; Attendance: 5,368; Referees: Juan Carlos García, Robert Lottermoser, Eduard Udyanskyy

=== Round 33 ===
6 April 2023	Žalgiris (Lithuanian Basketball Federation)	68–67	(Israeli Basketball Association) Maccabi Playtika Tel Aviv	Kaunas
19:00 (CEST)	Scoring by quarter: 17–17, 25–28, 14–7, 12–15
	Pts: Šmits 13; Rebs: Hayes, Butkevičius 6 Asts: Butkevičius 4 PIR: Šmits 18	Boxscore	Pts: Baldwin, Martin 12; Rebs: Colson 6 Asts: Baldwin 10; PIR: Nebo 14	Arena: Žalgirio Arena; Attendance: 15,225; Referees: Saša Pukl, Carmelo Paternicò, Luka Kardum

6 April 2023	Crvena zvezda Meridianbet (Basketball Federation of Serbia)	87–79	(Hellenic Basketball Federation) Olympiacos	Belgrade
19:00 (CEST)	Scoring by quarter: 26–30, 19–17, 20–12, 22–20
	Pts: Campazzo 20; Rebs: Petrušev, Martin 5 Asts: Campazzo 8 PIR: Campazzo 33	Boxscore	Pts: Vezenkov 16; Rebs: Vezenkov 8 Asts: Walkup 5 PIR: Vezenkov 23	Arena: Aleksandar Nikolić Hall; Attendance: 7,368; Referees: Miguel Ángel Pérez, Joseph Bissang, Robert Vyklický

6 April 2023	Fenerbahçe Beko (Turkish Basketball Federation)	103–86	(Turkish Basketball Federation) Anadolu Efes	Istanbul
19:45 (CEST)	Scoring by quarter: 23–17, 25–23, 24–24, 31–22
	Pts: Hayes 26; Rebs: Pierre 8 Asts: three players 4 PIR: Hayes 32	Boxscore	Pts: Clyburn 21; Rebs: Žižić 7 Asts: Larkin 6 PIR: Clyburn 24	Arena: Ülker Sports and Event Hall; Attendance: 11,709; Referees: Juan Carlos García, Damir Javor, Tomislav Hordov

6 April 2023	Valencia Basket (Spanish Basketball Federation)	79–68	(Italian Basketball Federation) Virtus Segafredo Bologna	Valencia
20:30 (CEST)	Scoring by quarter: 17–19, 23–19, 18–19, 21–11
	Pts: Evans 15; Rebs: López-Arostegui 6 Asts: Evans 6 PIR: Evans 23	Boxscore	Pts: Ojeleye 21; Rebs: Ojeleye, Mickey 6 Asts: three players 4 PIR: Ojeleye 28	Arena: La Fonteta; Attendance: 5,221; Referees: Robert Lottermoser, Mehdi Difallah, Milan Nedović

6 April 2023	Real Madrid (Spanish Basketball Federation)	79–67	(German Basketball Federation) Bayern Munich	Madrid
20:45 (CEST)	Scoring by quarter: 19–13, 21–23, 16–8, 23–23
	Pts: Hezonja 20; Rebs: Musa, Tavares 5 Asts: Rodríguez 5 PIR: Yabusele 18	Boxscore	Pts: Obst 21; Rebs: Cheatham 8 Asts: Weiler-Babb 3 PIR: Cheatham 22	Arena: WiZink Center; Attendance: 7,239; Referees: Borys Ryzhyk, Fernando Rocha, Adar Peer

6 April 2023	Cazoo Baskonia (Spanish Basketball Federation)	120–100	(French Federation of Basketball) LDLC ASVEL	Vitoria-Gasteiz
21:00 (CEST)	Scoring by quarter: 32–24, 23–27, 33–24, 32–25
	Pts: Thompson 23; Rebs: Kotsar 6 Asts: Thompson 12; PIR: Thompson 36	Boxscore	Pts: Mathews 25; Rebs: Tyus 7 Asts: Obasohan 5 PIR: Mathews 29	Arena: Buesa Arena; Attendance: 11,065; Referees: Sašo Petek, Uroš Nikolić, Sérgio Silva

7 April 2023	Panathinaikos (Hellenic Basketball Federation)	84–88	(German Basketball Federation) ALBA Berlin	Marousi
20:00 (CEST)	Scoring by quarter: 17–25, 25–24, 26–17, 16–22
	Pts: Bacon 16; Rebs: Papagiannis 9 Asts: Bochoridis, Bacon 3 PIR: Grigonis, Papagiannis 16	Boxscore	Pts: Smith 14; Rebs: Wetzell 6 Asts: Smith 5 PIR: Smith, Sikma 16	Arena: OAKA Altion; Attendance: 4,120; Referees: Milivoje Jovčić, Emin Moğulkoç, Amit Balak

7 April 2023	EA7 Emporio Armani Milan (Italian Basketball Federation)	84–76	(Spanish Basketball Federation) Barcelona	Assago
20:30 (CEST)	Scoring by quarter: 18–21, 21–15, 19–12, 26–28
	Pts: Napier 18; Rebs: Melli 6 Asts: Shields, Pangos 5 PIR: Melli 18	Boxscore	Pts: Kuric 17; Rebs: Şanlı 6 Asts: three players 3 PIR: Kuric 15	Arena: Mediolanum Forum; Attendance: 11,294; Referees: Ilija Belošević, Matej Boltauzer, Gytis Vilius

7 April 2023	AS Monaco (French Federation of Basketball)	84–88	(Basketball Federation of Serbia) Partizan Mozzart Bet	Fontvieille
21:00 (CEST)	Scoring by quarter: 22–18, 13–24, 21–20, 28–26
	Pts: Okobo 23; Rebs: Brown 6 Asts: James 6 PIR: Okobo 25	Boxscore	Pts: LeDay, Avramović 22; Rebs: Lessort 9 Asts: Punter 4 PIR: LeDay 24	Arena: Salle Gaston Médecin; Attendance: 4,677; Referees: Sreten Radović, Carlos Peruga, Gentian Cici

=== Round 34 ===
13 April 2023	ALBA Berlin (German Basketball Federation)	88–71	(French Federation of Basketball) LDLC ASVEL	Berlin
19:00 (CEST)	Scoring by quarter: 20–16, 18–20, 27–18, 23–17
	Pts: Olinde, Sikma 12; Rebs: Sikma 7 Asts: Smith 7 PIR: Sikma 19	Boxscore	Pts: Fall 14; Rebs: Fall 6 Asts: Bost 5 PIR: Fall 17	Arena: Mercedes-Benz Arena; Attendance: 8,972; Referees: Matej Boltauzer, Tomislav Hordov, Ioannis Foufis

13 April 2023	Crvena zvezda Meridianbet (Basketball Federation of Serbia)	91–89(OT)	(Turkish Basketball Federation) Fenerbahçe Beko	Belgrade
19:00 (CEST)	Scoring by quarter: 15–21, 26–18, 16–18, 22–22, Overtime: 12–10
	Pts: Campazzo 24; Rebs: Petrušev 6 Asts: Mitrović 4 PIR: Vildoza 21	Boxscore	Pts: Motley 27; Rebs: Motley, Hayes 8 Asts: Calathes 12; PIR: Hayes 25	Arena: Aleksandar Nikolić Hall; Attendance: 7,259; Referees: Robert Lottermoser, Carmelo Paternicò, Jordi Aliaga

13 April 2023	Olympiacos (Hellenic Basketball Federation)	86–78	(Spanish Basketball Federation) Cazoo Baskonia	Piraeus
20:00 (CEST)	Scoring by quarter: 19–11, 26–22, 21–22, 20–23
	Pts: Vezenkov 23; Rebs: Vezenkov 10; Asts: Walkup 7 PIR: Vezenkov 31	Boxscore	Pts: Howard 29; Rebs: Thompson, Giedraitis 8 Asts: Thompson 6 PIR: Howard 19	Arena: Peace and Friendship Stadium; Attendance: 10,334; Referees: Sreten Radović, Gytis Vilius, Seffi Shemmesh

13 April 2023	Maccabi Playtika Tel Aviv (Israeli Basketball Association)	100–96(OT)	(Spanish Basketball Federation) Real Madrid	Tel Aviv
20:05 (CEST)	Scoring by quarter: 16–18, 21–24, 28–20, 21–24, Overtime: 14–10
	Pts: Brown 22; Rebs: Nebo 11; Asts: Baldwin 8 PIR: Brown 27	Boxscore	Pts: Yabusele 25; Rebs: Yabusele 8 Asts: Rodríguez, Hanga 5 PIR: Yabusele 29	Arena: Menora Mivtachim Arena; Attendance: 10,649; Referees: Damir Javor, Anne Panther, Hugues Thépénier

13 April 2023	Virtus Segafredo Bologna (Italian Basketball Federation)	89–84	(Italian Basketball Federation) EA7 Emporio Armani Milan	Bologna
20:30 (CEST)	Scoring by quarter: 22–26, 17–21, 26–21, 24–16
	Pts: Hackett 25; Rebs: Weems 5 Asts: Hackett 10; PIR: Hackett 36	Boxscore	Pts: Voigtmann 19; Rebs: Voigtmann, Hall 6 Asts: Shields 5 PIR: Voigtmann 20	Arena: Segafredo Arena; Attendance: 6,547; Referees: Juan Carlos García, Emin Moğulkoç, Fernando Rocha

14 April 2023	Anadolu Efes (Turkish Basketball Federation)	87–72	(French Federation of Basketball) AS Monaco	Istanbul
19:30 (CEST)	Scoring by quarter: 23–16, 18–23, 19–15, 27–18
	Pts: Pleiß 21; Rebs: Pleiß 12; Asts: Micić, Larkin 6 PIR: Pleiß 25	Boxscore	Pts: Makoundou 16; Rebs: James, Hall 9 Asts: James, Okobo 4 PIR: Makoundou 19	Arena: Sinan Erdem Dome; Attendance: 10,066; Referees: Borys Ryzhyk, Oļegs Latiševs, Milan Nedović

14 April 2023	Bayern Munich (German Basketball Federation)	80–83	(Lithuanian Basketball Federation) Žalgiris	Munich
20:30 (CEST)	Scoring by quarter: 18–19, 20–15, 9–17, 33–32
	Pts: Walden 14; Rebs: Gillespie 7 Asts: Winston 4 PIR: Obst 13	Boxscore	Pts: Lekavičius 20; Rebs: Butkevičius 9 Asts: Butkevičius 6 PIR: Lekavičius 19	Arena: Audi Dome; Attendance: 5,469; Referees: Ilija Belošević, Emilio Pérez, Vasiliki Tsaroucha

14 April 2023	Partizan Mozzart Bet (Basketball Federation of Serbia)	83–81	(Hellenic Basketball Federation) Panathinaikos	Belgrade
20:30 (CEST)	Scoring by quarter: 18–26, 21–19, 19–21, 25–15
	Pts: Exum 18; Rebs: Lessort 9 Asts: Exum 4 PIR: Exum 27	Boxscore	Pts: Bacon 19; Rebs: Gudaitis 8 Asts: Bacon 4 PIR: Gudaitis 19	Arena: Štark Arena; Attendance: 20,017; Referees: Robert Lottermoser, Joseph Bissang, Rain Peerandi

14 April 2023	Barcelona (Spanish Basketball Federation)	85–71	(Spanish Basketball Federation) Valencia Basket	Barcelona
20:30 (CEST)	Scoring by quarter: 24–21, 27–25, 21–15, 13–10
	Pts: Mirotić 18; Rebs: Şanlı 8 Asts: Abrines 6 PIR: Abrines 23	Boxscore	Pts: Harper 14; Rebs: Alexander 6 Asts: three players 4 PIR: Claver 12	Arena: Palau Blaugrana; Attendance: 6,500; Referees: Saša Pukl, Uroš Nikolić, Luka Kardum

== Average home attendances ==
As of 14 April 2023

Pos	Team	Total	High	Low	Average	Change
1	(Basketball Federation of Serbia) Partizan Mozzart Bet	302,302	20,068	13,776	17,782	n/a^{1}
2	(Lithuanian Basketball Federation) Žalgiris	251,748	15,272	11,024	14,809	+94.1%
3	(Turkish Basketball Federation) Anadolu Efes	222,687	15,290	10,032	13,099	−4.2%
4	(Israeli Basketball Association) Maccabi Playtika Tel Aviv	164,379	10,662	9,917	10,274	−0.2%
5	(Turkish Basketball Federation) Fenerbahçe Beko	174,117	15,760	7,732	10,246	+84.8%
6	(Hellenic Basketball Federation) Olympiacos	163,301	11,632	0	9,606	+56.8%
7	(Italian Basketball Federation) EA7 Emporio Armani Milan	160,535	12,336	6,900	9,443	+111.8%
8	(German Basketball Federation) ALBA Berlin	150,908	13,166	6,545	8,877	+132.1%
9	(Spanish Basketball Federation) Cazoo Baskonia	151,628	15,504	6,036	8,919	+29.5%
10	(Spanish Basketball Federation) Real Madrid	129,865	10,305	6,381	7,639	+34.7%
11	(Basketball Federation of Serbia) Crvena zvezda Meridianbet	120,334	8,300	5,893	7,078	+17.1%
12	(Spanish Basketball Federation) Barcelona	107,002	7,511	5,066	6,294	+29.2%
13	(Italian Basketball Federation) Virtus Segafredo Bologna	104,312	9,072	3,648	6,136	n/a^{1}
14	(Hellenic Basketball Federation) Panathinaikos	102,153	14,700	2,340	6,009	+54.8%
15	(Spanish Basketball Federation) Valencia Basket	103,010	7,906	4,978	6,059	n/a^{1}
16	(German Basketball Federation) Bayern Munich	95,222	6,500	3,817	5,951	+179.8%
17	(French Federation of Basketball) LDLC ASVEL	92,298	5,560	4,897	5,429	+28.1%
18	(Fédération Monégasque de Basketball) AS Monaco	73,082	4,899	3,655	4,299	+24.4%
	League total	2,446,276	20,068	0	8,706	+54.6%

Source: Euroleague
Notes:
1: Team did not participate in the last EuroLeague regular season.
