= 2020–21 ASVEL Basket season =

ASVEL
2020–21 season
- Owner: Tony Parker
- President: Tony Parker
- Head coach: T.J. Parker
- Arena: Astroballe
- Pro A: Scheduled
- EuroLeague: Scheduled
- French Cup: TBD
| Home | Away | EuroLeague |
- All statistics correct as of 8 July 2020.

The 2020–21 ASVEL Basket season was the 72nd season in the existence of the club. The club played in the LNB Pro A and in the EuroLeague.

== Players ==
=== Squad information ===
LDLC ASVEL roster
Players
Coaches

| Pos. | No. | Nat. | Name | Ht. | Wt. | Age |
|---|---|---|---|---|---|---|
| PG | 3 | (France) | Heurtel, Thomas | 1.89 m (6 ft 2 in) | 91 kg (201 lb) | 37 – 10 April 1989 |
| SF | 5 | (France) | Kahudi, Charles | 1.99 m (6 ft 6 in) | 100 kg (220 lb) | 39 – 19 July 1986 |
| G/F | 6 | (France) | Lacombe, Paul | 1.95 m (6 ft 5 in) | 79 kg (174 lb) | 35 – 12 June 1990 |
| G | 8 | (France) | Diot, Antoine | 1.93 m (6 ft 4 in) | 86 kg (190 lb) | 37 – 17 January 1989 |
| C | 10 | (France) | Fall, Moustapha | 2.18 m (7 ft 2 in) | 124 kg (273 lb) | 34 – 23 February 1992 |
| PF | 12 | (France) | Noua, Amine | 2.02 m (6 ft 8 in) | 89 kg (196 lb) | 29 – 7 February 1997 |
| C | 13 | (United States) | Hayes, Kevarrius | 2.06 m (6 ft 9 in) | 103 kg (227 lb) | 29 – 5 March 1997 |
| F/C | 17 | (United Kingdom) | Marsh, Matthew | 2.11 m (6 ft 11 in) | | 23 – 15 May 2002 |
| C | 21 | (Belgium) | Bako, Ismaël | 2.08 m (6 ft 10 in) | 98 kg (216 lb) | 30 – 10 October 1995 |
| SG | 23 | (United States) | Lighty, David | 1.98 m (6 ft 6 in) | 98 kg (216 lb) | 37 – 27 May 1988 |
| SF | 25 | (France) | Howard, William | 2.03 m (6 ft 8 in) | 93 kg (205 lb) | 32 – 25 October 1993 |
| PF | 28 | (France) | Yabusele, Guerschon | 2.03 m (6 ft 8 in) | 118 kg (260 lb) | 30 – 17 December 1995 |
| G | 30 | (United States) | Cole, Norris | 1.88 m (6 ft 2 in) | 79 kg (174 lb) | 37 – 13 October 1988 |
| G | 32 | (France) | Strazel, Matthew | 1.82 m (6 ft 0 in) | 81 kg (179 lb) | 23 – 5 August 2002 |

Head coach

- (France) T. J. Parker

Assistant coach(es)

/* Squad information */

- (France) Frédéric Fauthoux
- (France) Bryan George
- (France) Morgan Belnou

Legend

- (C) Team captain
- Injured

- Roster
- Transactions
Updated: January 31, 2021

=== Depth chart ===
| Pos. | Starting 5 | Bench 1 | Bench 2 |
|---|---|---|---|
| C | Moustapha Fall | Ismaël Bako | Kevarrius Hayes |
| PF | Guerschon Yabusele | Amine Noua | Matthew Marsh |
| SF | Charles Kahudi | William Howard |
| SG | David Lighty | Antoine Diot | Paul Lacombe |
| PG | Thomas Heurtel | Norris Cole | Matthew Strazel |

=== Transactions ===
==== In ====
| Pos. | # | Player | Moving from | Date | Ref. |
|---|---|---|---|---|---|
| SG | 0 | (United States) Allerik Freeman | (China) Shenzhen Aviators | 12 June 2020 | |
| GF | 6 | (France) Paul Lacombe | (France) Monaco | 29 May 2020 | |
| C | 10 | (France) Moustapha Fall | (Turkey) Türk Telekom | 3 June 2020 | |
| C | 13 | (United States) Kevarrius Hayes | (Italy) Pallacanestro Cantù | 8 June 2020 | |
| PG | 30 | (United States) Norris Cole | (France) Monaco | 3 June 2020 | |

==== Out ====
| Pos. | # | Player | Moving to | Date | Ref. |
|---|---|---|---|---|---|
| PG | 2 | (United States) Jordan Taylor | (Japan) Levanga Hokkaido | 7 July 2019 | |
| SF | 11 | (France) Charles Galliou | (France) JDA Dijon | 1 July 2019 | |
| PF | 17 | (France) Livio Jean-Charles | (Greece) Olympiacos | 1 July 2019 | |
