= Lisle Township, Illinois =

Lisle Township
- Township
- Flag Seal

- Location in DuPage County

- DuPage County's location in Illinois
- Coordinates: 41°46′18″N 88°05′19″W
- Country: United States
- State: Illinois
- County: DuPage
- Established: November 6, 1849

Government
  - Supervisor: Dr. Joann Wright

Area
  - Total: 35.99 sq mi (93.2 km^{2})
  - Land: 35.37 sq mi (91.6 km^{2})
  - Water: 0.61 sq mi (1.6 km^{2}) 1.70%
- Elevation: 715 ft (218 m)

Population (2020)
  - Total: 119,040
  - Density: 3,366/sq mi (1,299/km^{2})
- Time zone: UTC-6 (CST)
  - Summer (DST): UTC-5 (CDT)
- ZIP codes: 60440, 60515, 60516, 60517, 60532, 60540, 60563, 60565
- FIPS code: 17-043-43952
- Website: Lisle Township

Lisle Township is one of nine townships in DuPage County, Illinois, United States. As of the 2020 census, its population was 119,040 and it contained 48,875 housing units.

== Geography ==
According to the 2021 census gazetteer files, Lisle Township has a total area of 35.99 square miles (93.21 km^{2}), of which 35.37 square miles (91.61 km^{2}) (or 98.30%) is land and 0.61 square miles (1.58 km^{2}) (or 1.70%) is water.

=== Cities, towns, and villages ===
- Bolingbrook (partial)
- Downers Grove (partial)
- Lisle (vast majority)
- Naperville (partial)
- Woodridge (partial)

=== Unincorporated communities ===
- Belmont at 41.792808°N 88.037842°W

(This list is based on USGS data and may include former settlements.)

=== Landmarks ===
- Morton Arboretum (headquarters in Lisle)
- DuPage County Green Valley Forest Preserve

== Transportation ==
=== Major highways ===
- Interstate 88
- Interstate 355
- U.S. Route 34
- Illinois Route 53

== Demographics ==
As of the 2020 census there were 119,040 people, 47,159 households, and 31,453 families residing in the township. The population density was 3,308.05 inhabitants per square mile (1,277.25/km^{2}). There were 48,875 housing units at an average density of 1,358.20 per square mile (524.40/km^{2}). The racial makeup of the township was 69.67% White, 5.67% African American, 0.28% Native American, 13.29% Asian, 0.04% Pacific Islander, 3.56% from other races, and 7.50% from two or more races. Hispanic or Latino of any race were 9.36% of the population.

There were 47,159 households, of which 29.80% had children under the age of 18 living with them, 55.69% were married couples living together, 8.06% had a female householder with no spouse present, and 33.30% were non-families. 27.90% of all households were made up of individuals, and 10.50% had someone living alone who was 65 years of age or older. The average household size was 2.49 and the average family size was 3.10.

The median age was 39.6 years. For every 100 females, there were 102.7 males. For every 100 females age 18 and over, there were 99.9 males.

The median income for a household in the township was $102,013, and the median income for a family was $127,529. The per capita income was $52,189. About 3.1% of families and 4.6% of the population were below the poverty line, including 5.6% of those under age 18 and 3.4% of those age 65 or over.

Historical population
Census	Pop.	Note	%±
1930	6,103		—
1940	7,756		27.1%
1950	11,237		44.9%
1960	20,982		86.7%
1970	47,818		127.9%
1980	82,575		72.7%
1990	108,452		31.3%
2000	117,604		8.4%
2010	116,268		−1.1%
2020	119,040		2.4%
U.S. Decennial Census

== Education ==
- Benedictine University
- DeVry University
- Lisle Community Unit School District 202
- Naperville Community Unit School District 203

== Political districts ==
- Illinois's 6th congressional district
- Illinois's 11th congressional district
- State House District 42
- State House District 47
- State House District 48
- State Senate District 21
- State Senate District 24
