= Thomas Aeschi =

Swiss businessman and politician

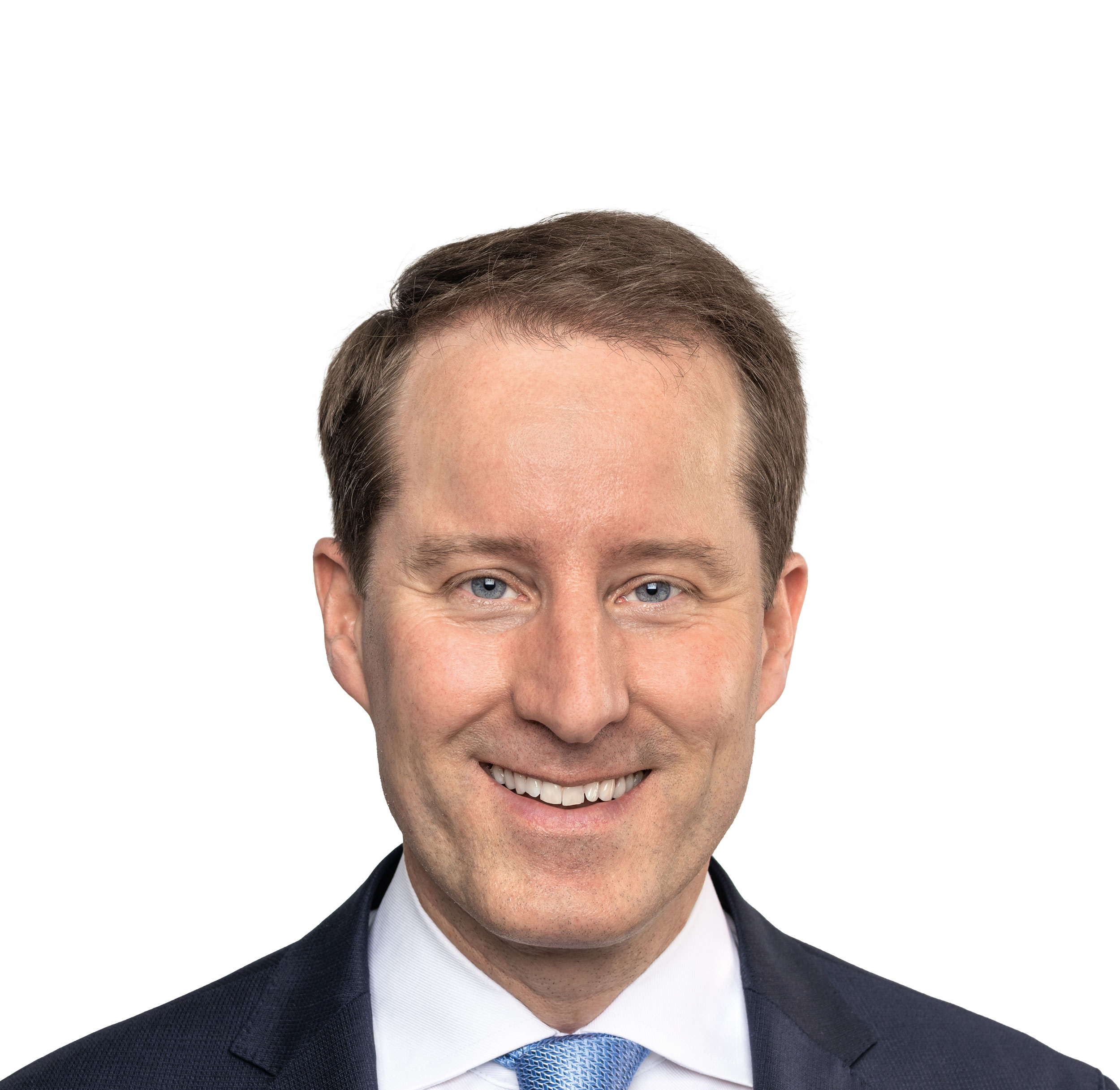
- Official portrait, 2023

Member of the National Council
- Incumbent
- Assumed office 5 December 2011
- Constituency: Canton of Zug

Member of the Cantonal Council of Zug
- In office 16 December 2010 – 28 August 2012

Personal details
- Born: Thomas Aeschi; 13 January 1979 (age 47) Zug, Zug, Switzerland
- Party: Swiss People's Party
- Spouse: Valeria Geissbühler (m. 2025)
- Children: 1
- Education: Lisle Senior High School
- Alma mater: University of St. Gallen (Licentiate); Harvard Kennedy School (MPA)
- Occupation: Banker, consultant, politician
- Website: aeschi.com (in German)

Military service
- Allegiance: Switzerland
- Branch/service: Swiss Armed Forces
- Rank: First Lieutenant

Thomas Aeschi (German pronunciation: [ˈtɒməs ˈɛʃi]; born 13 January 1979) is a Swiss businessman, politician and former banker. He currently serves as a member of the National Council for the Swiss People's Party since 2011. He previously served on the Cantonal Council of Zug from 2010 to 2012.

== Early life and education ==
Aeschi was born 13 January 1979 in Zug, Switzerland, the oldest of three sons, to Siegfried Aeschi, a tax consultant, and Margrit Aeschi (née Brun), who was a nurse. He has two younger brothers. He was raised in the hamlet of Allenwinden.

In 1996, he completed an international exchange year at Lisle Senior High School in Lisle, Illinois, a suburb of Chicago. In 1998, Aeschi obtained his Type B Matura and studied Economics at the University of St. Gallen. Aeschi also holds a Master of Public Administration from Harvard Kennedy School.

== Career ==
In 2004, he started his banking career in M&A at Credit Suisse in Zurich, where he stayed in various positions until 2006. He currently is Managing Partner of his independent consulting firm Aeschi & Company, LLC in Baar. He is currently on various boards such as Helvetische Bank in Zurich founded by Thomas Matter.

== Political career ==
His parliamentary career began in 2010 when he was elected to the Cantonal Council for a term of two years (2010-2012). He was elected to the National Council in 2011. In November 2015, The SVP Parliamentary Group in the federal council presented Aeschi as its official candidate for the 2015 federal council election and in 2017 he became president of the SVP Parliamentary Group. From 2015 to 2021 he served as president of SVP Kanton Zug. In 2022, he made a racist comment against Nigerians calling them rapists. Apology was tendered on his behalf by a member of his parliamentary group. On November 2026, he was selected by the SVP Parliamentary Group as a candidate to succeed Guy Parmelin on the Swiss Federal Council.

== Personal life ==
Aeschi, who was notably known as a long time bachelor without a private life, was introduced to his spouse at an election event of the Swiss People's Party in 2019.

In 2025, Aeschi married Valeria Geissbühler (born 1991), a laboratory technician at the University of Zurich and municipal councilor of Schübelbach. They have one daughter born in 2024.

Aeschi resides in Baar, Switzerland.
