= T. J. Parker (basketball) =

French-American basketball player and coach

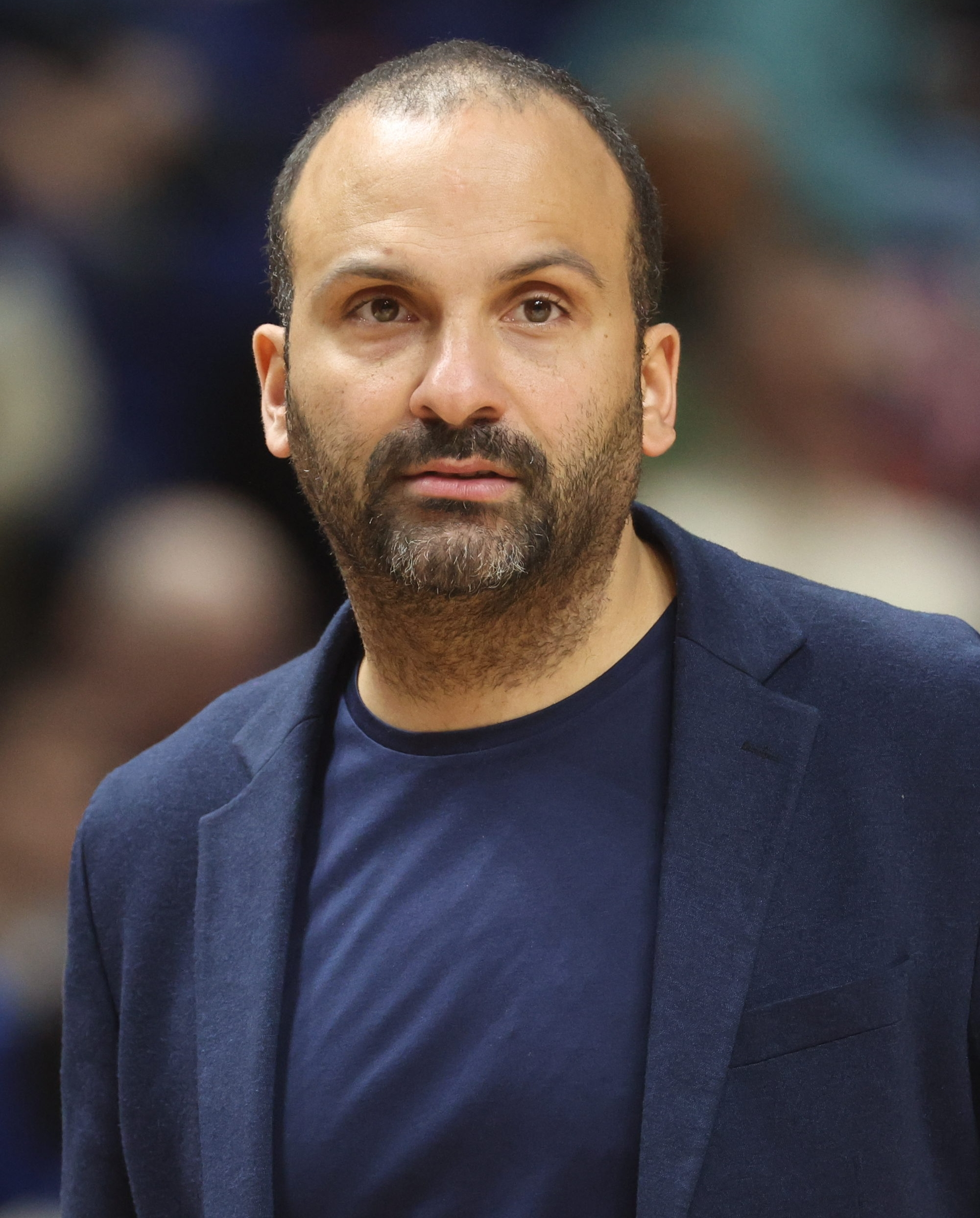

Chorale Roanne Basket
- Title: Head coach
- League: LNB Pro A

Personal information
- Born: May 16, 1984 (age 42) Valenciennes, France
- Listed height: 6 ft 2 in (1.88 m)
- Listed weight: 185 lb (84 kg)

Career information
- High school: Lisle (Lisle, Illinois)
- College: Northwestern (2002–2005)
- NBA draft: 2005: undrafted
- Playing career: 2005–2010
- Position: Point guard / shooting guard
- Number: 6, 9, 11
- Coaching career: 2013–present

Career history

Playing
- 2005–2007: Paris Basket Racing
- 2007–2009: SLUC Nancy Basket
- 2009–2010: ASVEL
- 2010: Orchies

Coaching
- 2013–2018: ASVEL (assistant)
- 2018: ASVEL (interim)
- 2018–2020: ASVEL (assistant)
- 2020–2023: ASVEL
- 2024–2025: Bayern Munich (assistant)
- 2025–present: Chorale Roanne Basket

Career highlights
- As player: French League champion (2008); French League Cup winner (2010); French Supercup winner (2008, 2009); As assistant coach: 2× French League champion (2016, 2019); French Federation Cup winner (2019); French Supercup winner (2016); As head coach: French Second League champion (2026); 2× French League champion (2021, 2022); French Cup winner (2021); Villeurbanne, France Invitational Game champion (2020)

Terence Jonathan Parker (born May 16, 1984) is a French-American former professional basketball player and a current professional coach. He is the former head coach for Chorale Roanne Basket of the LNB Pro A.

== Early life ==
Parker attended Lisle High School, in Lisle, Illinois, where he played both high school basketball and football.

== Playing career ==
=== College career ===
Parker played college basketball at Northwestern University, with the Northwestern Wildcats, from 2002 to 2005.

=== Professional career ===
In 2005, after playing college basketball at Northwestern University in Illinois, Parker came back to France, and he suited up for the Paris Basket Racing club. On November 19, 2006, he scored a career-high 23 points, on 7-for-11 shooting from 3-point range, in an 83–77 win over Pau-Orthez. In 2007, he joined the French Pro A League club SLUC Nancy.

In 2009, he moved to the French Pro A League club ASVEL. After playing in the French 3rd Division with Orchies, Parker retired from playing pro club basketball in 2010, due to knee issues.

=== National team career ===
Parker was a member of the French Under-18 and Under-20 junior national teams. He played with France's Under-18 junior national team at the 2002 FIBA Europe Under-18 Championship. Parker also trained with the senior French national team in 2006.

== Coaching career ==
After his short playing career, Parker decided to become an assistant coach with the French club ASVEL, in 2013. In January 2018, he became the club's interim head coach, after J. D. Jackson was fired from the position. After that, Parker was once again an assistant coach with the club, working under the team's head coach at the time, Zvezdan Mitrović.

On June 17, 2020, Parker was promoted, and he became the team's new head coach. On October 20, 2023, he was dismissed after a 0–4 start in the EuroLeague.

== Personal life ==
T. J. Parker's father Tony Parker Sr., is a former professional basketball player. His mother, Pamela Firestone, is Dutch. Parker's great-uncle Jan Wienese, is an Olympic gold medalist in rowing. T. J. Parker is the younger brother of Tony Parker, who is the President of the French basketball club ASVEL, and a former basketball player of the NBA clubs the San Antonio Spurs and the Charlotte Hornets. His younger brother Pierre, is a former professional basketball player.
