= Baba Miller =

Spanish basketball player (born 2004)

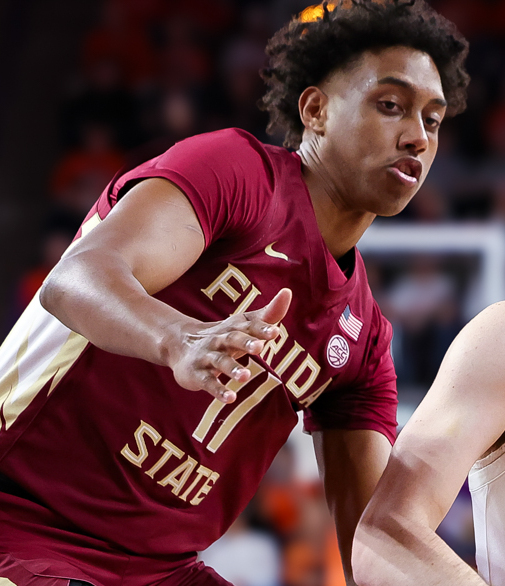
- Miller with the Florida State Seminoles 2024

No. 18 – Los Angeles Clippers
- Position: Power forward / small forward
- League: NBA

Personal information
- Born: February 7, 2004 (age 22) Palma de Mallorca, Spain
- Listed height: 6 ft 11 in (2.11 m)
- Listed weight: 204 lb (93 kg)

Career information
- College: Florida State (2022–2024); Florida Atlantic (2024–2025); Cincinnati (2025–2026)
- NBA draft: 2026: 2nd round, 36th overall pick
- Drafted by: Los Angeles Clippers
- Playing career: 2021–present

Career history
- 2021–2022: Real Madrid
- 2026–present: Los Angeles Clippers

Career highlights
- Second-team All-Big 12 (2026); Big 12 All-Newcomer Team (2026)
- Stats at NBA.com
- Stats at Basketball Reference

Papa "Baba" Ababacar Niang Miller (born February 7, 2004) is a Spanish professional basketball player for the Los Angeles Clippers of the National Basketball Association (NBA). He played in the youth squads of Real Madrid Baloncesto, after which he moved to the U.S. to play college basketball for the Florida State Seminoles, Florida Atlantic Owls and Cincinnati Bearcats.

== Early life ==
Miller was born on February 7, 2004, in Palma de Mallorca, in the Balearic Islands in Spain. He has Senegalese and British ancestry. He began playing as a youth for CB Bahía San Agustín of Mallorca and later moved to Madrid to play for Distrito Olímpico. At age 12, he joined Real Madrid Baloncesto and played with the organization through the 2021–22 season. Starting with the youth B team, he played through all the team categories and was promoted to the senior team in December 2021, making his EuroLeague debut in a 71–65 win over PBC CSKA Moscow. He was a member of Real Madrid's winning team in the 2020–21 Euroleague Basketball Next Generation Tournament and averaged 11.3 points and 5.3 rebounds per game with the Real Madrid B Team in 2021–22.

== College career ==
Miller decided to move to the United States and play for a team in the National Collegiate Athletic Association (NCAA) in 2022, stating that he thought it was best for his development. Considered one of the top international prospects, he committed to play for the Florida State Seminoles over the Gonzaga Bulldogs. Prior to the start of the season, Miller was suspended by the NCAA, initially for the entire year but later for 16 games, due to him having received US$3,000 in third-party money to attend a training camp in 2020; his family paid the money back once they learned that it violated NCAA rules, but the suspension was upheld, drawing widespread criticism. He made his return from suspension against the Wake Forest Demon Deacons, scoring four points and having four rebounds in a 90–75 loss. He finished the season with 15 games played while averaging 4.3 points and 3.7 rebounds per game.

Miller announced in April 2023 that he was returning for his sophomore season at Florida State rather than declaring for the 2023 NBA draft.

In May 2024, Miller announced he was withdrawing from the NBA draft and that he would be transferring to Florida Atlantic University. Miller averaged 11 points, seven rebounds and three assists during the 2024–25 season with the Owls, and was selected to the All-American Athletic Conference team.

Miller transferred to Cincinnati for the 2025-2026 season. With the Bearcats, Miller led the Big 12 Conference in rebounds and became the first player since Oscar Robertson to lead Cincinnati in points, rebounds and assists in the same season. After the season, he was named to All-Big 12 Second Team and Big 12 All-Newcomer Team.

== Professional career ==
On June 24, 2026, Miller was selected by the Los Angeles Clippers with the 36th overall pick in the 2026 NBA draft.

== International career ==
Miller played for the Spain men's national under-18 basketball team, including at the 2021 FIBA U18 European Challengers tournament where he averaged 11.8 points, 4.4 rebounds and 2.0 assists per game. In 2023, he was a member of the national under-19 team that won the FIBA Under-19 Basketball World Cup, starting in the finals and recording 11 points scored and five rebounds in the game, while having an average of 9.4 points and 6.0 rebounds in the tournament.

== Career statistics ==
=== EuroLeague ===
Year	Team	GP	GS	MPG	FG%	3P%	FT%	RPG	APG	SPG	BPG	PPG	PIR
2021–22	Real Madrid	1	0	1.9	.0	.0	.0	1	0	1	0	0	-1
