= Belmont, Illinois =

- Unincorporated community
- Location within Illinois Location within the United States
- Coordinates: 41°47′34″N 88°02′16″W
- Country: United States
- State: Illinois
- County: DuPage
- Township: Lisle, Downers Grove
- Elevation: 692 ft (211 m)

Population (2019)(unofficial)
  - Total: 5,250
- Time zone: UTC-6 (Central (CST))
  - Summer (DST): UTC-5 (CDT)
- ZIP Code: 60516
- Area codes: 630 & 331
- GNIS feature ID: 421703

Belmont (also known as Belmont Valley) is a former village and unincorporated community in Lisle Township, DuPage County, Illinois, United States. It was first settled in 1835. It was incorporated as a village in 1980 and disincorporated in 2004, after which portions of the area were annexed into nearby Downers Grove. It is typically defined as the area west of Denburn Woods and east of I-355, in between Downers Grove and Woodridge. The Belmont Train Station is in the town. St. Joseph Creek, a tributary of the DuPage River, runs through the town. Prior to 2008, Belmont had a small business district along Belmont Road, most of which was demolished in order to make way for a new underpass beneath the train tracks. A post office under the name "Belmont Valley" with the ZIP Code 60516 was once located on Belmont Road, and closed on October 1, 2004. The community and surrounding valley are served by the Northwest Belmont Water Improvement Association, which in 2009, reported 3,075 people in their service area. In 2019, the community had an estimated population of 5,250.
