= 2021–22 Real Madrid Baloncesto season =

Real Madrid
2021–22 season
- President: (Spain) Florentino Pérez
- Head coach: (Spain) Pablo Laso
- Arena: WiZink Center
- Liga ACB: Winners
- EuroLeague: Runners-up
- Copa del Rey: Runners-up
- Supercopa de España: Winners
- Highest home attendance: Liga ACB: 12,315; Real Madrid 81–74 Barcelona (19 June 2022) EuroLeague: 9,131; Real Madrid 68–86 Barcelona (11 February 2022)
- Lowest home attendance: Liga ACB: 2,648; Real Madrid 78–68 Obradoiro (26 September 2021) EuroLeague: 3,087; Real Madrid 94–86 Monaco (13 October 2021)
- Average home attendance: Liga ACB: 5,709; EuroLeague: 5,943
- Biggest win: Real Madrid 95–61 Bilbao Basket (7 November 2021)
- Biggest defeat: Žalgiris 68–47 Real Madrid (24 February 2022)
| Home | Away |

The 2021–22 season was Real Madrid's 91st in existence, their 66th consecutive season in the top flight of Spanish basketball and 15th consecutive season in the EuroLeague. It was also the 11th (and last) season in a row under the reins of head coach Pablo Laso.

Times up to 31 October 2021 and from 27 March 2022 were CEST (UTC+2). Times from 31 October 2021 to 27 March 2022 were CET (UTC+1).

== Overview ==
=== Pre-season ===
On 18 June, head coach Pablo Laso extended his contract until the end of the 2022–2023 season. Six days later, captain Felipe Reyes announced his retirement after 17 seasons in Madrid. On 6 July, Real Madrid announced Thomas Heurtel as the first signing of the season. Six days later, power forward Guerschon Yabusele signed a one-year contract with the club. On 13 July, Nigel Williams-Goss signed for 2 years. On 23 July, Ádám Hanga was announced as a new signing of the club for the next 2 years.

== Players ==
=== Squad information ===
Note: Flags indicate national team eligibility at FIBA-sanctioned events. Players may hold other non-FIBA nationalities not displayed.

Real Madrid roster
Players
Coaches

| Pos. | No. | Nat. | Name | Ht. | Wt. | Age |
|---|---|---|---|---|---|---|
| G | 0 | (United States) | Williams-Goss, Nigel (injured) | 1.91 m (6 ft 3 in) | 86 kg (190 lb) | 27 – 16 September 1994 |
| SG | 1 | (France) | Causeur, Fabien | 1.96 m (6 ft 5 in) | 86 kg (190 lb) | 35 – 16 June 1987 |
| PG | 2 | (Spain) | Núñez, Juan | 1.92 m (6 ft 4 in) | 82 kg (181 lb) | 18 – 4 June 2004 |
| F/C | 3 | (United States) (Slovenia) | Randolph, Anthony (injured) | 2.11 m (6 ft 11 in) | 104 kg (229 lb) | 32 – 15 July 1989 |
| PG | 4 | (France) | Heurtel, Thomas (S) | 1.88 m (6 ft 2 in) | 82 kg (181 lb) | 33 – 10 April 1989 |
| G/F | 5 | (Spain) | Fernández, Rudy | 1.96 m (6 ft 5 in) | 83 kg (183 lb) | 37 – 4 April 1985 |
| SF | 6 | (Spain) | Abalde, Alberto | 2.02 m (6 ft 8 in) | 95 kg (209 lb) | 26 – 15 December 1995 |
| SG | 7 | (Slovenia) | Klavžar, Urban | 1.86 m (6 ft 1 in) | 80 kg (176 lb) | 18 – 27 May 2004 |
| SF | 8 | (Hungary) | Hanga, Ádám | 2.00 m (6 ft 7 in) | 96 kg (212 lb) | 33 – 12 April 1989 |
| PG | 12 | (Spain) | Alocén, Carlos (injured) | 1.94 m (6 ft 4 in) | 84 kg (185 lb) | 21 – 30 December 2000 |
| SF | 14 | (Argentina) | Deck, Gabriel | 1.98 m (6 ft 6 in) | 105 kg (231 lb) | 27 – 8 February 1995 |
| C | 17 | (France) | Poirier, Vincent | 2.13 m (7 ft 0 in) | 110 kg (243 lb) | 28 – 17 October 1993 |
| C | 22 | (Cape Verde) | Tavares, Edy | 2.20 m (7 ft 3 in) | 125 kg (276 lb) | 30 – 22 March 1992 |
| G | 23 | (Spain) | Llull, Sergio (C) | 1.90 m (6 ft 3 in) | 94 kg (207 lb) | 34 – 15 November 1987 |
| PF | 28 | (France) | Yabusele, Guerschon | 2.01 m (6 ft 7 in) | 123 kg (271 lb) | 26 – 17 December 1995 |
| F/C | 30 | (Spain) (Senegal) | Ndiaye, Eli | 2.04 m (6 ft 8 in) | 83 kg (183 lb) | 17 – 26 June 2004 |
| PF | 33 | (United States) | Thompkins, Trey (S) | 2.08 m (6 ft 10 in) | 108 kg (238 lb) | 32 – 29 May 1990 |
| G/F | 44 | (United States) (Sweden) | Taylor, Jeffery | 2.01 m (6 ft 7 in) | 102 kg (225 lb) | 33 – 23 May 1989 |

Head coach

- (Spain) Pablo Laso

Assistant coach(es)

- (Spain) Jesús Mateo
- (Spain) Paco Redondo
- (Spain) Isidoro Calin

Athletic trainer(s)

- (Spain) Juan Trapero

Legend

- (C) Team captain
- Injured

- Roster
Updated: June 4, 2022

=== Depth chart ===
| Pos. | Starting 5 | Bench 1 | Bench 2 | Bench 3 | Inactive |
|---|---|---|---|---|---|
| C | Edy Tavares | Vincent Poirier |
| PF | Guerschon Yabusele | Anthony Randolph (injured) | | Eli Ndiaye | Trey Thompkins |
| SF | Gabriel Deck | Ádám Hanga | Alberto Abalde |
| SG | Fabien Causeur | Rudy Fernández | Jeffery Taylor | Urban Klavžar |
| PG | Nigel Williams-Goss (injured) | Sergio Llull | Carlos Alocén (injured) | Juan Núñez | Thomas Heurtel |

=== Transactions ===
==== In ====
| No. | Pos. | Nat. | Name | Age | Moving from | | Type | Ends | Transfer fee | Date | Source |
|---|---|---|---|---|---|---|---|---|---|---|---|
| 4 | PG | (France) | Thomas Heurtel | 37 | ASVEL | (France) | Transfer | June 2022 | Free | 6 July 2021 | |
| 28 | PF | (France) | Guerschon Yabusele | 30 | ASVEL | (France) | Transfer | June 2022 | Free | 12 July 2021 | |
| 0 | G | (United States) | Nigel Williams-Goss | 32 | Lokomotiv Kuban | (Russia) | Transfer | June 2023 | Free | 13 July 2021 | |
| 8 | SF | (Hungary) | Ádám Hanga | 37 | Barcelona | (Spain) | Transfer | June 2023 | Free | 13 July 2021 | |
| 14 | SF | (Argentina) | Gabriel Deck | 31 | Oklahoma City Thunder | (United States) | Transfer | June 2024 | Free | 19 January 2022 | |

==== Out ====
| No. | Pos. | Nat. | Name | Age | Moving to | | Type | Transfer fee | Date | Source |
|---|---|---|---|---|---|---|---|---|---|---|
| 7 | F/C | (Israel) | Alex Tyus | 38 | Pınar Karşıyaka | (Turkey) | End of contract | Free | 1 July 2021 | |
| 8 | PG | (Argentina) | Nicolás Laprovíttola | 36 | Barcelona | (Spain) | End of contract | Free | 1 July 2021 | |
| 9 | F/C | (Spain) | Felipe Reyes | 46 | | | Retirement | | 24 June 2021 | |
| 20 | SG | (United States) | Jaycee Carroll | 43 | | | Retirement | | 30 June 2021 | |
| 16 | F/C | (Spain) | Usman Garuba | 24 | Houston Rockets | (United States) | Transfer | €3,000,000 | 10 August 2021 | |
| 11 | PF | (Serbia) | Tristan Vukčević | 23 | Partizan | (Serbia) | Transfer | Undisclosed | 27 January 2022 | |

== Pre-season and friendlies ==
=== Friendly matches ===
| 1 September 2021 | Real Madrid | 80–84 | UCAM Murcia | Albacete |
| 19:00 | Scoring by quarter: 22–16, 14–24, 13–25, 31–19 |
| | Pts: Yabusele 19 | Boxscore | Pts: McFadden 18 | Arena: Pabellón del Parque |

| 3 September 2021 | Unicaja | 88–75 | Real Madrid | Málaga |
| 20:00 | Scoring by quarter: 28–16, 19–27, 18–16, 23–16 |
| | Pts: Eric 21 | Boxscore | Pts: Heurtel, Hanga 11 | Arena: Martín Carpena |

| 4 September 2021 | Real Madrid | 80–65 | UCAM Murcia | Málaga |
| 20:00 | Scoring by quarter: 23–14, 16–13, 21–19, 20–19 |
| | Pts: Poirier 17 | Boxscore | Pts: Webb 12 | Arena: Martín Carpena |

== Competitions ==
=== Overview ===
| Competition | First match | Last match | Starting round | Final position | Record | | | | | | | |
| Competition | First match | Last match | Starting round | Final position | Pld | W | D | L | PF | PA | PD | Win % |
|---|---|---|---|---|---|---|---|---|---|---|---|---|
| Liga ACB | 19 September 2021 | 19 June 2022 | Round 1 | Winners | 43 | 33 | 0 | 10 | 3,597 | 3,248 | +349 | 76.74 |
| EuroLeague | 30 September 2021 | 21 May 2022 | Round 1 | Runners-up | 38 | 26 | 0 | 12 | 3,052 | 2,863 | +189 | 68.42 |
| Copa del Rey | 17 February 2022 | 20 February 2022 | Quarter-finals | Runners-up | 3 | 2 | 0 | 1 | 226 | 205 | +21 | 66.67 |
| Supercopa de España | 11 September 2021 | 12 September 2021 | Semi-finals | Winners | 2 | 2 | 0 | 0 | 160 | 153 | +7 | 100.00 |
| Total | | | | | 86 | 63 | 0 | 23 | 7,035 | 6,469 | +566 | 73.26 |

Source: Competitions

=== Liga ACB ===
==== League table ====
| Pos | Team | Pld | W | L | PF | PA | PD | Qualification or relegation |
|---|---|---|---|---|---|---|---|---|
| 1 | Barça | 34 | 27 | 7 | 2833 | 2539 | +294 | Qualification to playoffs |
| 2 | Real Madrid | 34 | 25 | 9 | 2840 | 2580 | +260 | Qualification to playoffs |
| 3 | Valencia Basket | 34 | 23 | 11 | 2827 | 2702 | +125 | Qualification to playoffs |
| 4 | Joventut | 34 | 22 | 12 | 2776 | 2666 | +110 | Qualification to playoffs |
| 5 | Lenovo Tenerife | 34 | 21 | 13 | 2819 | 2685 | +134 | Qualification to playoffs |

Source: ACB
Rules for classification: 1) Win–loss record; 2) Head–to–head record; 3) Head–to–head point difference; 4) Point difference; 5) Points scored; 6) Sum of quotients of points scored (Note: Head–to–head record is used only after all the matches between the teams in question have been played)

==== Results summary ====
| Overall | | | | | | Home | | | | | Away | | | | |
| Pld | W | L | PF | PA | PD | W | L | PF | PA | PD | W | L | PF | PA | PD |
|---|---|---|---|---|---|---|---|---|---|---|---|---|---|---|---|
| 34 | 25 | 9 | 2840 | 2580 | +260 | 11 | 6 | 1412 | 1268 | +144 | 14 | 3 | 1428 | 1312 | +116 |

Last updated: 14 May 2022.
Source: Competitive matches

==== Results by round ====
| Round | 1 | 2 | 3 | 4 | 5 | 6 | 7 | 8 | 9 | 10 | 11 | 12 | 13 | 14 | 15 | 16 | 17 | 18 | 19 | 20 | 21 | 22 | 23 | 24 | 25 | 26 | 27 | 28 | 29 | 30 | 31 | 32 | 33 | 34 |
|---|---|---|---|---|---|---|---|---|---|---|---|---|---|---|---|---|---|---|---|---|---|---|---|---|---|---|---|---|---|---|---|---|---|---|
| Ground | H | A | H | H | A | A | H | A | H | A | H | A | H | A | A | H | A | H | A | H | H | A | H | A | H | H | A | A | H | A | H | A | H | A |
| Result | W | W | W | W | W | W | L | W | W | W | W | W | W | W | W | L | W | W | L | L | L | W | L | W | L | W | L | L | W | W | W | W | W | W |
| Position | 5 | 2 | 1 | 1 | 1 | 2 | 2 | 2 | 2 | 1 | 1 | 1 | 1 | 1 | 1 | 1 | 1 | 1 | 1 | 1 | 1 | 1 | 1 | 1 | 2 | 2 | 2 | 2 | 2 | 2 | 2 | 2 | 2 | 2 |

Source: Competitive matches
A = Away; H = Home; W = Win; L = Loss; R = Rest

==== Matches ====
| 19 September 2021 1 | Real Madrid | 70–63 | Hereda San Pablo Burgos | Madrid |
| 18:30 | Scoring by quarter: 21–18, 15–16, 19–18, 15–11 |
| | Pts: Hanga 14; Rebs: Poirier 9 Asts: Williams-Goss 3 PIR: Poirier 24 | Boxscore | Pts: Braimoh 10; Rebs: Kravić 12; Asts: Kullamäe 4 PIR: Kravić 13 | Arena: WiZink Center; Attendance: 3,597; Referees: Benjamín Jiménez, Juan de Dios Oyón, Héctor Baez |

| 24 September 2021 2 | MoraBanc Andorra | 58–86 | Real Madrid | Andorra la Vella |
| 21:30 | Scoring by quarter: 14–21, 16–17, 14–26, 14–22 |
| | Pts: Diagne 10; Rebs: Olumuyiwa 5 Asts: Crawford, Hannah 4 PIR: Paulí, Hannah 9 | Boxscore | Pts: Tavares 15; Rebs: Poirier 10; Asts: Heurtel 8 PIR: Tavares 26 | Arena: M.I. Govern Andorra; Attendance: 1,500; Referees: Óscar Perea, Rafael Serrano, Joaquín García |

| 26 September 2021 3 | Real Madrid | 78–68 | Monbus Obradoiro | Madrid |
| 20:00 | Scoring by quarter: 20–13, 16–17, 15–21, 27–17 |
| | Pts: Poirier 13; Rebs: Poirier 8 Asts: three players 2 PIR: Poirier 19 | Boxscore | Pts: Ellenson 20; Rebs: Ellenson 7 Asts: T. Scrubb 4 PIR: Ellenson 22 | Arena: WiZink Center; Attendance: 2,648; Referees: Jordi Aliaga, Javier Torres, Carlos Merino |

| 3 October 2021 4 | Real Madrid | 86–77 | Lenovo Tenerife | Madrid |
| 18:30 | Scoring by quarter: 25–18, 15–17, 18–19, 28–23 |
| | Pts: Yabusele 15; Rebs: Yabusele 7 Asts: Heurtel, Tavares 4 PIR: Tavares 20 | Boxscore | Pts: Fitipaldo 24; Rebs: Sulejmanović 7 Asts: Fitipaldo 4 PIR: Fitipaldo 21 | Arena: WiZink Center; Attendance: 2,987; Referees: Daniel Hierrezuelo, Jorge Martínez, Alberto Baena |

| 10 October 2021 5 | Valencia Basket | 79–93 | Real Madrid | Valencia |
| 18:30 | Scoring by quarter: 23–20, 16–22, 21–22, 19–29 |
| | Pts: Hermannsson 20; Rebs: Rivero 6 Asts: Hermannsson 6 PIR: Hermannsson 23 | Boxscore | Pts: Fernández 12; Rebs: Yabusele 6 Asts: three players 4 PIR: Heurtel 19 | Arena: La Fonteta; Attendance: 6,368; Referees: Emilio Pérez Pizarro, Luis Miguel Castillo, Alfonso Olivares |

| 17 October 2021 6 | Río Breogán | 71–79 | Real Madrid | Lugo |
| 17:00 | Scoring by quarter: 20–12, 13–28, 18–23, 20–16 |
| | Pts: Bell-Haynes 17; Rebs: Musa 6 Asts: Bell-Haynes 3 PIR: Musa, Bell-Haynes 16 | Boxscore | Pts: Yabusele 14; Rebs: Tavares 8 Asts: Heurtel 4 PIR: Tavares 21 | Arena: Pazo dos Deportes; Attendance: 4,228; Referees: Juan Carlos García González, Vicente Bultó, David Sánchez |

| 24 October 2021 7 | Real Madrid | 70–75 | Gran Canaria | Madrid |
| 12:30 | Scoring by quarter: 21–14, 14–21, 17–18, 18–22 |
| | Pts: Tavares 18; Rebs: Tavares 13; Asts: Abalde 4 PIR: Tavares 31 | Boxscore | Pts: Pustovyi 14; Rebs: Pustovyi 6 Asts: Albicy 7 PIR: Albicy 20 | Arena: WiZink Center; Attendance: 5,105; Referees: Fernando Calatrava, Raúl Zamorano, Iyán González |

| 31 October 2021 8 | Bitci Baskonia | 65–83 | Real Madrid | Vitoria-Gasteiz |
| 18:30 | Scoring by quarter: 10–16, 16–23, 12–24, 27–20 |
| | Pts: Sedekerskis 11; Rebs: Sedekerskis 6 Asts: Baldwin 3 PIR: Sedekerskis 18 | Boxscore | Pts: Yabusele 14; Rebs: Poirier 10; Asts: Heurtel 5 PIR: three players 17 | Arena: Buesa Arena; Attendance: 10,038; Referees: Antonio Conde, Alberto Sánchez Sixto, Javier Torres |

| 7 November 2021 9 | Real Madrid | 95–61 | Surne Bilbao Basket | Madrid |
| 20:00 | Scoring by quarter: 30–15, 24–14, 23–20, 18–12 |
| | Pts: Hanga 19; Rebs: Poirier 9 Asts: Heurtel 8 PIR: Poirier 23 | Boxscore | Pts: Goudelock 14; Rebs: Delgado 10; Asts: three players 2 PIR: Delgado 14 | Arena: WiZink Center; Attendance: 4,796; Referees: Óscar Perea, Rubén Sánchez Mohedas, Roberto Lucas |

| 14 November 2021 10 | Urbas Fuenlabrada | 85–88 | Real Madrid | Fuenlabrada |
| 12:30 | Scoring by quarter: 20–34, 29–13, 20–17, 16–24 |
| | Pts: Emegano 27; Rebs: Ristić, Emegano 5 Asts: Samar, Novak 5 PIR: Ristić 27 | Boxscore | Pts: Causeur 19; Rebs: Tavares 11; Asts: Heurtel 9 PIR: Heurtel 22 | Arena: Fernando Martín; Attendance: 4,616; Referees: Jordi Aliaga, Francisco Araña, Cristóbal Sánchez |

| 21 November 2021 11 | Real Madrid | 71–48 | Coosur Real Betis | Madrid |
| 12:30 | Scoring by quarter: 18–6, 14–15, 25–13, 14–14 |
| | Pts: Abalde, Tavares 11; Rebs: Poirier 9 Asts: three players 3 PIR: Tavares 18 | Boxscore | Pts: Evans 22; Rebs: Burjanadze 9 Asts: Burjanadze 3 PIR: Evans 20 | Arena: WiZink Center; Attendance: 5,383; Referees: Rafael Serrano, Sergio Manuel, Alberto Sánchez Sixto |

| 4 December 2021 12 | Casademont Zaragoza | 65–86 | Real Madrid | Zaragoza |
| 20:45 | Scoring by quarter: 15–20, 21–15, 13–24, 16–27 |
| | Pts: Okoye 15; Rebs: Radončić 7 Asts: Mobley 4 PIR: Okoye 15 | Boxscore | Pts: Llull 17; Rebs: Tavares 8 Asts: Heurtel 5 PIR: Heurtel 16 | Arena: Pabellón Príncipe Felipe; Attendance: 6,083; Referees: Miguel Ángel Pérez Pérez, Juan de Dios Oyón, Vicente Martínez |

| 12 December 2021 13 | Real Madrid | 79–74 | Unicaja | Madrid |
| 21:00 | Scoring by quarter: 16–19, 15–18, 31–16, 17–21 |
| | Pts: Hanga 14; Rebs: Poirier 8 Asts: Heurtel 6 PIR: Llull 16 | Boxscore | Pts: Bouteille 14; Rebs: Brizuela 5 Asts: Díaz 4 PIR: Fernández 17 | Arena: WiZink Center; Attendance: 5,710; Referees: Antonio Conde, Raúl Zamorano, Iyán González |

| 19 December 2021 14 | UCAM Murcia | 71–80 | Real Madrid | Murcia |
| 18:30 | Scoring by quarter: 17–25, 18–20, 17–14, 19–21 |
| | Pts: Taylor 16; Rebs: Lima 8 Asts: Lima 4 PIR: Lima 14 | Boxscore | Pts: Poirier 24; Rebs: Poirier 7 Asts: three players 3 PIR: Poirier 31 | Arena: Palacio de Deportes; Attendance: 5,218; Referees: Carlos Peruga, Martín Caballero, Roberto Lucas |

| 4 January 2022 17 | Baxi Manresa | 87–92 | Real Madrid | Manresa |
| 21:00 | Scoring by quarter: 19–16, 19–24, 30–28, 19–24 |
| | Pts: Thomasson 15; Rebs: Moneke 6 Asts: Francisco, Pérez 6 PIR: Thomasson 15 | Boxscore | Pts: Tavares 17; Rebs: Tavares 12; Asts: four players 3 PIR: Tavares 32 | Arena: Nou Congost; Attendance: 2,500; Referees: Carlos Cortés, Juan de Dios Oyón, Iyán González |

| 9 January 2022 15 | Joventut | 71–90 | Real Madrid | Badalona |
| 19:15 | Scoring by quarter: 20–24, 22–14, 16–27, 13–25 |
| | Pts: Tomić 18; Rebs: Tomić 9 Asts: Vives 5 PIR: Tomić 27 | Boxscore | Pts: Heurtel 20; Rebs: Tavares, Poirier 6 Asts: Hanga, Llull 4 PIR: Yabusele 18 | Arena: Palau Municipal d'Esports; Attendance: 8,041; Referees: Emilio Pérez Pizarro, Francisco Araña, Yasmina Alcaraz |
Note: The game, originally scheduled for 27 December 2021, was postponed due to a COVID-19 outbreak in Real Madrid's squad.

| 16 January 2022 18 | Real Madrid | 94–69 | Casademont Zaragoza | Madrid |
| 17:00 | Scoring by quarter: 28–7, 25–26, 21–17, 20–19 |
| | Pts: Poirier 19; Rebs: Randolph 8 Asts: Heurtel 6 PIR: Poirier 29 | Boxscore | Pts: Bone, Waczyński 12; Rebs: Vanwijn, Hlinason 6 Asts: Bone 4 PIR: Bone 13 | Arena: WiZink Center; Attendance: 3,581; Referees: Jordi Aliaga, Alberto Sánchez Sixto, Esperanza Mendoza |

| 23 January 2022 16 | Real Madrid | 75–85 | Barça | Madrid |
| 18:30 | Scoring by quarter: 24–18, 16–24, 14–21, 21–22 |
| | Pts: Tavares 12; Rebs: Yabusele 5 Asts: Williams-Goss, Abalde 3 PIR: Tavares 18 | Boxscore | Pts: Kuric, Şanlı 17; Rebs: Laprovíttola, Şanlı 5 Asts: Laprovíttola 6 PIR: Laprovíttola, Kuric 19 | Arena: WiZink Center; Attendance: 7,049; Referees: Benjamín Jiménez, Óscar Perea, Alfonso Olivares |
Note: The game, originally scheduled for 2 January 2022, was postponed due to a COVID-19 outbreak in Barça's squad.

| 30 January 2022 20 | Real Madrid | 83–88 | MoraBanc Andorra | Madrid |
| 20:00 | Scoring by quarter: 21–18, 21–20, 20–30, 21–20 |
| | Pts: Causeur 16; Rebs: Tavares 7 Asts: Heurtel, Alocén 3 PIR: Deck 17 | Boxscore | Pts: Miller-McIntyre 28; Rebs: Miller-McIntyre 7 Asts: Miller-McIntyre 8 PIR: Miller-McIntyre 34 | Arena: WiZink Center; Attendance: 3,579; Referees: Carlos Peruga, Rubén Sánchez Mohedas, Vicente Martínez |

| 6 February 2022 21 | Real Madrid | 93–94 | Valencia Basket | Madrid |
| 18:30 | Scoring by quarter: 30–31, 18–20, 23–23, 22–20 |
| | Pts: Llull 17; Rebs: Poirier 8 Asts: Heurtel 4 PIR: Fernández 23 | Boxscore | Pts: Prepelič, Rivero 16; Rebs: López-Arostegui 8 Asts: Dimitrijević, Hermannsson 5 PIR: López-Arostegui 17 | Arena: WiZink Center; Attendance: 5,398; Referees: Jordi Aliaga, Sergio Manuel, Joaquín García |

| 13 February 2022 22 | Unicaja | 91–92 | Real Madrid | Málaga |
| 18:30 | Scoring by quarter: 23–25, 26–22, 16–18, 26–27 |
| | Pts: Brizuela 18; Rebs: Guerrero 7 Asts: Díaz, Brizuela 4 PIR: Guerrero 15 | Boxscore | Pts: Heurtel, Causeur 16; Rebs: Tavares 8 Asts: Heurtel 4 PIR: Heurtel 18 | Arena: Martín Carpena; Attendance: 6,257; Referees: Fernando Calatrava, Javier Torres, David Sánchez |

| 6 March 2022 23 | Real Madrid | 72–80 | Bitci Baskonia | Madrid |
| 18:30 | Scoring by quarter: 16–14, 22–15, 16–28, 18–23 |
| | Pts: Tavares 16; Rebs: Deck 5 Asts: Heurtel 8 PIR: Tavares 23 | Boxscore | Pts: Enoch 17; Rebs: A. Peters 7 Asts: A. Peters, Baldwin 4 PIR: A. Peters 19 | Arena: WiZink Center; Attendance: 6,123; Referees: Carlos Peruga, Arnau Padrós, Esperanza Mendoza |

| 13 March 2022 24 | Hereda San Pablo Burgos | 70–85 | Real Madrid | Burgos |
| 18:30 | Scoring by quarter: 14–22, 16–19, 17–22, 23–22 |
| | Pts: Eddie, Nnoko 14; Rebs: Nnoko 5 Asts: Renfroe 9 PIR: Gamble 13 | Boxscore | Pts: Yabusele 20; Rebs: Poirier 10; Asts: Heurtel, Deck 6 PIR: Poirier 24 | Arena: Coliseum Burgos; Attendance: 8,829; Referees: Antonio Conde, Sergio Manuel, Vicente Martínez |

| 20 March 2022 25 | Real Madrid | 75–86 | Baxi Manresa | Madrid |
| 12:30 | Scoring by quarter: 22–15, 19–19, 16–30, 18–22 |
| | Pts: Deck 21; Rebs: Tavares 10; Asts: Llull 4 PIR: Deck 25 | Boxscore | Pts: Maye 20; Rebs: Moneke 10; Asts: Francisco 6 PIR: Moneke 23 | Arena: WiZink Center; Attendance: 6,031; Referees: Carlos Cortés, Luis Miguel Castillo, Cristóbal Sánchez |

| 27 March 2022 26 | Real Madrid | 92–77 | Urbas Fuenlabrada | Madrid |
| 12:30 | Scoring by quarter: 22–18, 23–13, 22–18, 25–28 |
| | Pts: Heurtel 21; Rebs: Deck 10; Asts: Llull, Heurtel 6 PIR: Heurtel 30 | Boxscore | Pts: Meindl 18; Rebs: Meindl, Ristić 6 Asts: Samar 5 PIR: Meindl 25 | Arena: WiZink Center; Attendance: 4,848; Referees: Óscar Perea, Jorge Martínez, David Sánchez |

| 3 April 2022 27 | Lenovo Tenerife | 72–59 | Real Madrid | San Cristóbal de La Laguna |
| 18:30 | Scoring by quarter: 14–18, 14–14, 13–11, 31–16 |
| | Pts: Fitipaldo 14; Rebs: Sulejmanović 12; Asts: Fitipaldo 9 PIR: Fitipaldo 22 | Boxscore | Pts: Llull, Yabusele 13; Rebs: Tavares 10; Asts: Heurtel 4 PIR: Tavares 19 | Arena: Santiago Martín; Attendance: 5,133; Referees: Daniel Hierrezuelo, Arnau Padrós, Roberto Lucas |

| 10 April 2022 28 | Barça | 108–97(OT) | Real Madrid | Barcelona |
| 18:30 | Scoring by quarter: 27–23, 24–23, 20–19, 18–24, Overtime: 19–8 |
| | Pts: Laprovíttola 20; Rebs: Exum, Calathes 7 Asts: Calathes 5 PIR: Exum 24 | Boxscore | Pts: Deck 17; Rebs: Poirier 6 Asts: Abalde 4 PIR: Deck 21 | Arena: Palau Blaugrana; Attendance: 7,438; Referees: Antonio Conde, Martín Caballero, Juan de Dios Oyón |

| 13 April 2022 19 | Surne Bilbao Basket | 79–67 | Real Madrid | Bilbao |
| 19:00 | Scoring by quarter: 22–18, 23–23, 15–14, 19–12 |
| | Pts: Goudelock, Inglis 14; Rebs: three players 6 Asts: Luz, Inglis 4 PIR: Inglis 18 | Boxscore | Pts: Llull 22; Rebs: Tavares, Deck 9 Asts: Tavares, Yabusele 2 PIR: Llull 13 | Arena: Bilbao Arena; Attendance: 7,218; Referees: Carlos Peruga, Luis Miguel Castillo, Esperanza Mendoza |
Note: The game, originally scheduled for 23 January 2022, was postponed due to the massive rescheduling of the 2021–22 ACB season caused by the COVID-19 pandemic.

| 17 April 2022 29 | Real Madrid | 90–65 | Río Breogán | Madrid |
| 12:30 | Scoring by quarter: 26–13, 27–16, 24–16, 13–20 |
| | Pts: Deck 15; Rebs: Poirier 9 Asts: Llull 7 PIR: Deck 25 | Boxscore | Pts: Kalinoski 10; Rebs: Cruz 9 Asts: Bell-Haynes 4 PIR: Luković 9 | Arena: WiZink Center; Attendance: 4,465; Referees: Fernando Calatrava, Francisco Araña, Andrés Fernández |

| 24 April 2022 30 | Coosur Real Betis | 69–71 | Real Madrid | Seville |
| 12:30 | Scoring by quarter: 16–18, 20–9, 9–20, 24–24 |
| | Pts: Brown 14; Rebs: Johnson 6 Asts: Evans 10; PIR: Bertāns 13 | Boxscore | Pts: Yabusele 16; Rebs: Tavares 14; Asts: Yabusele, Williams-Goss 3 PIR: Tavares 25 | Arena: San Pablo; Attendance: 5,850; Referees: Óscar Perea, Vicente Bultó, Raúl Zamorano |

| 1 May 2022 31 | Real Madrid | 99–89 | Joventut | Madrid |
| 18:30 | Scoring by quarter: 29–23, 18–23, 29–23, 23–20 |
| | Pts: Hanga 20; Rebs: Poirier 8 Asts: Llull 6 PIR: Poirier 25 | Boxscore | Pts: Tomić 25; Rebs: Willis 6 Asts: Ribas 5 PIR: Tomić 27 | Arena: WiZink Center; Attendance: 6,305; Referees: Daniel Hierrezuelo, Juan de Dios Oyón, Fabio Fernández |

| 8 May 2022 32 | Monbus Obradoiro | 88–89 | Real Madrid | Santiago de Compostela |
| 18:00 | Scoring by quarter: 21–23, 23–23, 19–16, 25–27 |
| | Pts: Hobbs 17; Rebs: Ellenson 6 Asts: Robertson 8 PIR: P. Scrubb 20 | Boxscore | Pts: Llull 21; Rebs: Poirier 8 Asts: Llull 5 PIR: Poirier 24 | Arena: Fontes do Sar; Attendance: 5,415; Referees: Carlos Peruga, Arnau Padrós, Esperanza Mendoza |

| 11 May 2022 33 | Real Madrid | 90–69 | UCAM Murcia | Madrid |
| 21:00 | Scoring by quarter: 19–21, 22–16, 27–12, 22–20 |
| | Pts: Tavares 14; Rebs: Tavares 9 Asts: Abalde 7 PIR: Tavares 23 | Boxscore | Pts: Webb 12; Rebs: Lima, Czerapowicz 6 Asts: Taylor 4 PIR: Taylor, Czerapowicz 11 | Arena: WiZink Center; Attendance: 4,430; Referees: Carlos Cortés, Vicente Bultó, Andrés Fernández |

| 14 May 2022 34 | Gran Canaria | 83–91 | Real Madrid | Las Palmas |
| 20:45 | Scoring by quarter: 17–23, 22–26, 18–21, 26–21 |
| | Pts: Ennis 24; Rebs: Ennis 5 Asts: Shurna 3 PIR: Ennis 23 | Boxscore | Pts: Yabusele 13; Rebs: Tavares 8 Asts: Llull 5 PIR: Yabusele, Tavares 15 | Arena: Gran Canaria Arena; Attendance: 6,796; Referees: Fernando Calatrava, Alberto Sánchez Sixto, Yasmina Alcaraz |

=== ACB Playoffs ===
Win Loss

==== Quarterfinals ====
| 25 May 2022 1 | Real Madrid | 93–76 | Baxi Manresa | Madrid |
| 21:00 | Scoring by quarter: 21–14, 27–15, 23–20, 22–27 |
| | Pts: Causeur 17; Rebs: Poirier 9 Asts: three players 4 PIR: Causeur 23 | Boxscore | Pts: Thomasson, Francisco 12; Rebs: Moneke 6 Asts: Thomasson 7 PIR: Maye 12 | Arena: WiZink Center; Attendance: 5,553; Referees: Carlos Peruga, Carlos Cortés, Iyán González |

| 28 May 2022 2 | Baxi Manresa | 74–83 | Real Madrid | Manresa |
| 16:30 | Scoring by quarter: 21–25, 18–16, 14–18, 21–24 |
| | Pts: Thomasson, Bako 16; Rebs: Bako 11; Asts: Francisco 5 PIR: Bako 24 | Boxscore | Pts: Yabusele 16; Rebs: Yabusele, Poirier 7 Asts: Llull 4 PIR: Yabusele, Tavares 18 | Arena: Nou Congost; Attendance: 4,906; Referees: Daniel Hierrezuelo, Juan de Dios Oyón, Alfonso Olivares |

==== Semifinals ====
| 2 June 2022 1 | Real Madrid | 94–84 | Bitci Baskonia | Madrid |
| 22:00 | Scoring by quarter: 22–19, 22–23, 30–21, 20–21 |
| | Pts: Causeur 16; Rebs: Tavares 13; Asts: Fernández, Núñez 4 PIR: Tavares 24 | Boxscore | Pts: Peters 15; Rebs: Costello, Enoch 6 Asts: Granger 7 PIR: Costello 16 | Arena: WiZink Center; Attendance: 6,123; Referees: Benjamín Jiménez, Carlos Cortés, Javier Torres |

| 4 June 2022 2 | Real Madrid | 83–71 | Bitci Baskonia | Madrid |
| 18:00 | Scoring by quarter: 18–15, 22–15, 26–15, 17–26 |
| | Pts: Hanga 18; Rebs: Tavares 8 Asts: Causeur 5 PIR: Tavares 22 | Boxscore | Pts: Marinković 17; Rebs: Baldwin, Enoch 7 Asts: Baldwin 4 PIR: Peters 19 | Arena: WiZink Center; Attendance: 7,789; Referees: Emilio Pérez Pizarro, Fernando Calatrava, Francisco Araña |

| 7 June 2022 3 | Bitci Baskonia | 77–85 | Real Madrid | Vitoria-Gasteiz |
| 21:00 | Scoring by quarter: 14–25, 22–16, 17–25, 24–19 |
| | Pts: Baldwin 26; Rebs: Costello 6 Asts: three players 2 PIR: Baldwin 16 | Boxscore | Pts: Tavares 23; Rebs: Tavares 12; Asts: Deck 4 PIR: Tavares 36 | Arena: Buesa Arena; Attendance: 9,748; Referees: Daniel Hierrezuelo, Jordi Aliaga, Juan de Dios Oyón |

==== Finals ====
| 13 June 2022 1 | Barça | 75–88 | Real Madrid | Barcelona |
| 21:00 | Scoring by quarter: 17–30, 14–19, 20–25, 24–14 |
| | Pts: Laprovíttola 15; Rebs: Davies, Mirotić 6 Asts: Calathes 4 PIR: Mirotić 16 | Boxscore | Pts: Deck 18; Rebs: Yabusele 9 Asts: Hanga 6 PIR: Deck 20 | Arena: Palau Blaugrana; Attendance: 6,759; Referees: Daniel Hierrezuelo, Jordi Aliaga, Martín Caballero |

| 15 June 2022 2 | Barça | 71–69 | Real Madrid | Barcelona |
| 21:00 | Scoring by quarter: 13–17, 19–15, 24–22, 15–15 |
| | Pts: Mirotić 26; Rebs: Mirotić 7 Asts: Jokubaitis 3 PIR: Mirotić 26 | Boxscore | Pts: Yabusele 16; Rebs: Yabusele 11; Asts: Deck, Hanga 2 PIR: Yabusele 21 | Arena: Palau Blaugrana; Attendance: 7,201; Referees: Emilio Pérez Pizarro, Fernando Calatrava, Luis Miguel Castillo |

| 17 June 2022 3 | Real Madrid | 81–66 | Barça | Madrid |
| 21:00 | Scoring by quarter: 21–16, 25–23, 20–14, 15–13 |
| | Pts: Deck 14; Rebs: Poirier 10; Asts: Hanga 3 PIR: Yabusele, Poirier 18 | Boxscore | Pts: Kuric 15; Rebs: Laprovíttola 4 Asts: Calathes 6 PIR: Kuric 15 | Arena: WiZink Center; Attendance: 11,793; Referees: Carlos Peruga, Benjamín Jiménez, Alberto Sánchez Sixto |

| 19 June 2022 4 | Real Madrid | 81–74 | Barça | Madrid |
| 18:00 | Scoring by quarter: 13–10, 21–23, 23–23, 24–18 |
| | Pts: Tavares 25; Rebs: Tavares 13; Asts: Deck 3 PIR: Tavares 41 | Boxscore | Pts: Mirotić 14; Rebs: Calathes 9 Asts: five players 2 PIR: Mirotić, Exum 17 | Arena: WiZink Center; Attendance: 12,315; Referees: Daniel Hierrezuelo, Óscar Perea, Martín Caballero |

=== EuroLeague ===
==== League table ====
| Pos | Team | Pld | W | L | PF | PA | PD | Qualification |
|---|---|---|---|---|---|---|---|---|
| 2 | (Hellenic Basketball Federation) Olympiacos | 28 | 19 | 9 | 2222 | 2045 | +177 | Qualification to playoffs |
| 3 | (Italian Basketball Federation) A|X Armani Exchange Milan | 28 | 19 | 9 | 2069 | 1992 | +77 | Qualification to playoffs |
| 4 | (Spanish Basketball Federation) Real Madrid | 28 | 18 | 10 | 2181 | 2079 | +102 | Qualification to playoffs |
| 5 | (Israeli Basketball Association) Maccabi Tel Aviv | 28 | 17 | 11 | 2272 | 2209 | +63 | Qualification to playoffs |
| 6 | (Turkish Basketball Federation) Anadolu Efes | 28 | 16 | 12 | 2322 | 2221 | +101 | Qualification to playoffs |

Source: EuroLeague
Rules for classification: All points scored in extra period(s) were not counted in the standings, nor for any tie-break situation.

==== Results summary ====
| Overall | | | | | | Home | | | | | Away | | | | |
| Pld | W | L | PF | PA | PD | W | L | PF | PA | PD | W | L | PF | PA | PD |
|---|---|---|---|---|---|---|---|---|---|---|---|---|---|---|---|
| 28 | 18 | 10 | 2181 | 2079 | +102 | 12 | 2 | 1138 | 1035 | +103 | 6 | 8 | 1043 | 1044 | −1 |

Last updated: 17 April 2022.
Source: Competitive matches

==== Results by round ====
| Round | 1 | 2 | 3 | 4 | 5 | 6 | 7 | 8 | 9 | 10 | 11 | 12 | 13 | 14 | 15 | 16 | 17 | 18 | 19 | 20 | 21 | 22 | 23 | 24 | 25 | 26 | 27 | 28 | 29 | 30 | 31 | 32 | 33 | 34 |
|---|---|---|---|---|---|---|---|---|---|---|---|---|---|---|---|---|---|---|---|---|---|---|---|---|---|---|---|---|---|---|---|---|---|---|
| Ground | H | A | H | H | H | A | A | A | H | A | H | A | H | A | H | A | H | A | H | A | H | A | A | H | H | H | A | A | H | H | A | A | A | H |
| Result | W | L | W | W | W | N | N | W | W | W | W | W | W | L | W | W | N | L | N | L | W | W | W | W | N | L | L | – | W | W | L | L | L | L |
| Position | 3 | 8 | 6 | 4 | 3 | 2 | 4 | 4 | 3 | 2 | 2 | 2 | 2 | 2 | 2 | 2 | 2 | 2 | 2 | 2 | 2 | 1 | 1 | 1 | 1 | 2 | 2 | 2 | 2 | 2 | 2 | 2 | 2 | 4 |

Source: Competitive matches
A = Away; H = Home; N = Annulled; W = Win; L = Loss

==== Matches ====
| 30 September 2021 1 | Real Madrid (Spain) | 82–69 | (Turkey) Anadolu Efes | Madrid |
| 20:45 | Scoring by quarter: 32–15, 18–20, 18–13, 14–21 |
| | Pts: Heurtel, Yabusele 15; Rebs: Tavares 12; Asts: Yabusele 4 PIR: Tavares 24 | Boxscore | Pts: Larkin 21; Rebs: Larkin 4 Asts: Larkin 6 PIR: Larkin 35 | Arena: WiZink Center; Attendance: 4,050; Referees: Robert Lottermoser, Oļegs Latiševs, Carmelo Paternicò |

| 8 October 2021 2 | Olympiacos (Greece) | 74–68 | (Spain) Real Madrid | Piraeus |
| 20:00 | Scoring by quarter: 13–10, 22–26, 19–16, 20–16 |
| | Pts: Vezenkov 16; Rebs: Vezenkov 10; Asts: Walkup 5 PIR: Vezenkov 18 | Boxscore | Pts: Williams-Goss 16; Rebs: Yabusele 7 Asts: Heurtel 5 PIR: Tavares 24 | Arena: Peace and Friendship Stadium; Attendance: 7,235; Referees: Borys Ryzhyk, Fernando Rocha, Piotr Pastusiak |

| 13 October 2021 3 | Real Madrid (Spain) | 94–86 | (France) AS Monaco | Madrid |
| 20:45 | Scoring by quarter: 30–12, 21–27, 21–26, 22–21 |
| | Pts: Yabusele 18; Rebs: Tavares 6 Asts: Heurtel 7 PIR: Yabusele 25 | Boxscore | Pts: James 24; Rebs: Hall 7 Asts: James 10; PIR: James 34 | Arena: WiZink Center; Attendance: 3,087; Referees: Luigi Lamonica, Marcin Kowalski, Mykola Ambrosov |

| 15 October 2021 4 | Real Madrid (Spain) | 88–65 | (Greece) Panathinaikos OPAP | Madrid |
| 21:00 | Scoring by quarter: 30–18, 12–12, 20–20, 26–15 |
| | Pts: Tavares 17; Rebs: Tavares 9 Asts: Heurtel 7 PIR: Tavares 31 | Boxscore | Pts: Macon 18; Rebs: Papagiannis 6 Asts: Perry 5 PIR: Perry 16 | Arena: WiZink Center; Attendance: 4,630; Referees: Sreten Radović, Sašo Petek, Hugues Thépénier |

| 21 October 2021 5 | Real Madrid (Spain) | 70–69 | (Turkey) Fenerbahçe Beko | Madrid |
| 21:00 | Scoring by quarter: 10–15, 25–26, 15–11, 20–17 |
| | Pts: Causeur 16; Rebs: Poirier 17; Asts: Fernández 3 PIR: Poirier, Causeur 15 | Boxscore | Pts: de Colo 11; Rebs: Polonara 5 Asts: de Colo 6 PIR: de Colo 18 | Arena: WiZink Center; Attendance: 6,595; Referees: Damir Javor, Anne Panther, Milan Nedović |

| 27 October 2021 6 | Zenit Saint Petersburg (Russia) | 68–75 | (Spain) Real Madrid | Saint Petersburg |
| 19:00 | Scoring by quarter: 13–22, 27–17, 17–20, 11–16 |
| | Pts: Baron 14; Rebs: Gudaitis 7 Asts: Loyd 5 PIR: three players 13 | Boxscore | Pts: Heurtel 15; Rebs: three players 4 Asts: Heurtel 6 PIR: Heurtel 22 | Arena: Yubileyny Sports Palace; Attendance: 1,911; Referees: Milivoje Jovčić, Carmelo Paternicò, Elias Koromilas |
Note: On 28 February 2022, Euroleague Basketball suspended participation of Russian teams following the Russian invasion of Ukraine. As a consequence, all their results were annulled.

| 29 October 2021 7 | UNICS (Russia) | 65–58 | (Spain) Real Madrid | Kazan |
| 18:00 | Scoring by quarter: 14–11, 21–23, 14–17, 16–7 |
| | Pts: Hezonja, Vorontsevich 13; Rebs: Jekiri 10; Asts: Spissu 9 PIR: J. Brown 14 | Boxscore | Pts: Tavares 15; Rebs: Poirier 8 Asts: Heurtel 6 PIR: Tavares 28 | Arena: Basket-Hall Kazan; Attendance: 2,741; Referees: Luigi Lamonica, Joseph Bissang, Seffi Shemmesh |
Note: On 28 February 2022, Euroleague Basketball suspended participation of Russian teams following the Russian invasion of Ukraine. As a consequence, all their results were annulled.

| 5 November 2021 8 | Bayern Munich (Germany) | 76–80 | (Spain) Real Madrid | Munich |
| 20:45 | Scoring by quarter: 13–13, 19–30, 26–17, 18–20 |
| | Pts: Rubit 20; Rebs: Hunter 6 Asts: Rubit 5 PIR: Rubit 21 | Boxscore | Pts: Yabusele 21; Rebs: Tavares 9 Asts: Heurtel, Llull 3 PIR: Yabusele 23 | Arena: Audi Dome; Attendance: 4,982; Referees: Borys Ryzhyk, Mario Majkić, Robert Vyklický |

| 12 November 2021 9 | Real Madrid (Spain) | 95–82 | (Lithuania) Žalgiris | Madrid |
| 20:45 | Scoring by quarter: 20–11, 31–34, 24–25, 20–12 |
| | Pts: Yabusele 15; Rebs: Tavares, Yabusele 6 Asts: Heurtel 5 PIR: Poirier 23 | Boxscore | Pts: Cavanaugh 14; Rebs: three players 4 Asts: Lekavičius 10; PIR: Lekavičius 17 | Arena: WiZink Center; Attendance: 6,798; Referees: Robert Lottermoser, Michele Rossi, Sérgio Silva |

| 16 November 2021 10 | LDLC ASVEL (France) | 74–87 | (Spain) Real Madrid | Villeurbanne |
| 20:00 | Scoring by quarter: 24–33, 19–18, 11–16, 20–20 |
| | Pts: Okobo 26; Rebs: Jones 6 Asts: Okobo 6 PIR: Okobo 26 | Boxscore | Pts: Causeur 25; Rebs: Tavares 10; Asts: Hanga 6 PIR: Tavares 25 | Arena: Astroballe; Attendance: 5,560; Referees: Saša Pukl, Fernando Rocha, Uroš Nikolić |

| 18 November 2021 11 | Real Madrid (Spain) | 79–67 | (Serbia) Crvena zvezda mts | Madrid |
| 20:45 | Scoring by quarter: 16–13, 16–19, 25–14, 22–21 |
| | Pts: Tavares 15; Rebs: Poirier 8 Asts: Fernández 6 PIR: Poirier, Tavares 23 | Boxscore | Pts: Hollins 16; Rebs: Davidovac 9 Asts: Ivanović 5 PIR: Hollins 17 | Arena: WiZink Center; Attendance: 5,825; Referees: Mehdi Difallah, Carmelo Paternicò, Elias Koromilas |

| 25 November 2021 12 | Bitci Baskonia (Spain) | 60–88 | (Spain) Real Madrid | Vitoria-Gasteiz |
| 20:30 | Scoring by quarter: 14–25, 20–28, 13–18, 13–17 |
| | Pts: Enoch, Fontecchio 14; Rebs: Fontecchio 7 Asts: Granger 4 PIR: Fontecchio 16 | Boxscore | Pts: Causeur 13; Rebs: Abalde 11; Asts: Heurtel 9 PIR: Heurtel 18 | Arena: Buesa Arena; Attendance: 8,218; Referees: Oļegs Latiševs, Tomislav Hordov, Rain Peerandi |

| 2 December 2021 13 | Real Madrid (Spain) | 72–70 | (Israel) Maccabi Playtika Tel Aviv | Madrid |
| 20:45 | Scoring by quarter: 20–18, 17–20, 13–21, 22–11 |
| | Pts: Heurtel, Yabusele 15; Rebs: Tavares 8 Asts: Heurtel 5 PIR: Tavares, Yabusele 17 | Boxscore | Pts: Wilbekin 14; Rebs: Sorkin 5 Asts: Wilbekin 5 PIR: Žižić 13 | Arena: WiZink Center; Attendance: 6,941; Referees: Robert Lottermoser, Gytis Vilius, Emin Moğulkoç |

| 10 December 2021 14 | Barcelona (Spain) | 93–80 | (Spain) Real Madrid | Barcelona |
| 21:00 | Scoring by quarter: 24–19, 27–23, 16–16, 26–22 |
| | Pts: Mirotić 31; Rebs: Mirotić 10; Asts: Laprovíttola, Jokubaitis 4 PIR: Mirotić 39 | Boxscore | Pts: Heurtel, Causeur 11; Rebs: Tavares 6 Asts: Heurtel 4 PIR: Tavares 13 | Arena: Palau Blaugrana; Attendance: 7,079; Referees: Sreten Radović, Sašo Petek, Uroš Nikolić |

| 14 December 2021 15 | Real Madrid (Spain) | 87–64 | (Germany) ALBA Berlin | Madrid |
| 20:45 | Scoring by quarter: 19–16, 24–10, 17–20, 27–18 |
| | Pts: Tavares 17; Rebs: Poirier 9 Asts: Williams-Goss 5 PIR: Tavares 25 | Boxscore | Pts: Thiemann 11; Rebs: Lammers 6 Asts: Blatt 5 PIR: Thiemann 12 | Arena: WiZink Center; Attendance: 5,010; Referees: Mehdi Difallah, Seffi Shemmesh, Ioannis Foufis |

| 16 December 2021 16 | A|X Armani Exchange Milan (Italy) | 73–75 | (Spain) Real Madrid | Assago |
| 20:30 | Scoring by quarter: 19–18, 8–17, 21–20, 25–20 |
| | Pts: Shields 18; Rebs: Hines, Melli 9 Asts: Rodríguez 5 PIR: Shields 19 | Boxscore | Pts: Causeur 17; Rebs: Tavares 8 Asts: Llull 5 PIR: Yabusele 22 | Arena: Mediolanum Forum; Attendance: 7,500; Referees: Ilija Belošević, Elias Koromilas, Tomasz Trawicki |

| 23 December 2021 17 | Real Madrid (Spain) | 71–65 | (Russia) CSKA Moscow | Madrid |
| 20:45 | Scoring by quarter: 24–14, 13–26, 19–15, 15–10 |
| | Pts: Williams-Goss 17; Rebs: Tavares 10; Asts: Williams-Goss 5 PIR: Tavares 28 | Boxscore | Pts: Clyburn 16; Rebs: Clyburn 13; Asts: Hackett, Shengelia 3 PIR: Milutinov 23 | Arena: WiZink Center; Attendance: 5,205; Referees: Saša Pukl, Oļegs Latiševs, Milan Nedović |
Note: On 28 February 2022, Euroleague Basketball suspended participation of Russian teams following the Russian invasion of Ukraine. As a consequence, all their results were annulled.

| 14 January 2022 21 | Real Madrid (Spain) | 89–74 | (Spain) Bitci Baskonia | Madrid |
| 20:45 | Scoring by quarter: 25–17, 25–18, 19–15, 20–24 |
| | Pts: Yabusele 17; Rebs: Randolph 12; Asts: four players 3 PIR: Yabusele 27 | Boxscore | Pts: Baldwin 16; Rebs: A. Peters 5 Asts: Baldwin 6 PIR: Baldwin 20 | Arena: WiZink Center; Attendance: 4,553; Referees: Sreten Radović, Milivoje Jovčić, Robert Vyklický |

| 20 January 2022 22 | ALBA Berlin (Germany) | 74–89 | (Spain) Real Madrid | Berlin |
| 20:00 | Scoring by quarter: 15–19, 21–29, 20–25, 18–16 |
| | Pts: Lô 21; Rebs: Sikma 9 Asts: Sikma 7 PIR: Lô 30 | Boxscore | Pts: Heurtel 17; Rebs: three players 5 Asts: Heurtel 7 PIR: Heurtel 18 | Arena: Mercedes-Benz Arena; Attendance: 1,600; Referees: Ilija Belošević, Fernando Rocha, Jakub Zamojski |

| 25 January 2022 19 | Real Madrid (Spain) | 85–68 | (Russia) UNICS | Madrid |
| 20:45 | Scoring by quarter: 21–14, 26–17, 27–14, 11–23 |
| | Pts: Tavares 14; Rebs: Tavares 11; Asts: Fernández, Heurtel 4 PIR: Tavares 28 | Boxscore | Pts: L. Brown, Jekiri 13; Rebs: Hezonja, Mayo 4 Asts: L. Brown 8 PIR: Jekiri 20 | Arena: WiZink Center; Attendance: 4,792; Referees: Matej Boltauzer, Carmelo Paternicò, Robert Vyklický |
Note: The match, originally scheduled for 6 January 2022, was postponed due to a COVID-19 outbreak within UNICS' squad. On 28 February 2022, Euroleague Basketball suspended participation of Russian teams following the Russian invasion of Ukraine. As a consequence, all their results were annulled.

| 28 January 2022 23 | AS Monaco (France) | 84–90(OT) | (Spain) Real Madrid | Fontvieille |
| 19:00 | Scoring by quarter: 18–16, 16–19, 23–21, 9–10, Overtime: 9–9, 9–15 |
| | Pts: Bacon, Diallo 19; Rebs: Motiejūnas 11; Asts: James 7 PIR: Diallo 23 | Boxscore | Pts: Yabusele 18; Rebs: Poirier 14; Asts: Heurtel 9 PIR: Yabusele 27 | Arena: Salle Gaston Médecin; Attendance: 3,400; Referees: Oļegs Latiševs, Milan Nedović, Jurgis Laurinavičius |

| 2 February 2022 24 | Real Madrid (Spain) | 75–67 | (Greece) Olympiacos | Madrid |
| 20:45 | Scoring by quarter: 10–15, 14–23, 26–13, 25–16 |
| | Pts: Heurtel 20; Rebs: Yabusele, Tavares 9 Asts: Llull 4 PIR: Tavares 24 | Boxscore | Pts: Vezenkov 16; Rebs: Papanikolaou 7 Asts: Sloukas 6 PIR: Vezenkov 20 | Arena: WiZink Center; Attendance: 5,723; Referees: Mehdi Difallah, Piotr Pastusiak, Saulius Račys |

| 4 February 2022 25 | Real Madrid (Spain) | 85–64 | (Russia) Zenit Saint Petersburg | Madrid |
| 20:45 | Scoring by quarter: 23–23, 22–13, 24–15, 16–13 |
| | Pts: Llull, Yabusele 13; Rebs: Poirier 8 Asts: Heurtel 6 PIR: Poirier 21 | Boxscore | Pts: Poythress 21; Rebs: Poythress 9 Asts: Kulagin 4 PIR: Poythress 23 | Arena: WiZink Center; Attendance: 5,457; Referees: Borys Ryzhyk, Elias Koromilas, Luka Kardum |
Note: On 28 February 2022, Euroleague Basketball suspended participation of Russian teams following the Russian invasion of Ukraine. As a consequence, all their results were annulled.

| 8 February 2021 18 | Fenerbahçe Beko (Turkey) | 66–51 | (Spain) Real Madrid | Istanbul |
| 19:45 | Scoring by quarter: 19–8, 8–9, 21–13, 18–21 |
| | Pts: Gudurić 12; Rebs: Booker, Pierre 8 Asts: Henry 9 PIR: Henry 18 | Boxscore | Pts: Tavares 14; Rebs: Tavares 9 Asts: Alocén 5 PIR: Tavares 27 | Arena: Ülker Sports and Event Hall; Attendance: 12,133; Referees: Sreten Radović, Gytis Vilius, Robert Vyklický |
Note: The match, originally scheduled for 29 December 2021, was postponed due to a COVID-19 outbreak within Real Madrid's squad.

| 11 February 2022 26 | Real Madrid (Spain) | 68–86 | (Spain) Barcelona | Madrid |
| 20:45 | Scoring by quarter: 8–28, 23–24, 24–19, 13–15 |
| | Pts: Tavares 25; Rebs: Hanga, Tavares 6 Asts: Llull 4 PIR: Tavares 35 | Boxscore | Pts: Laprovíttola 20; Rebs: Laprovíttola 7 Asts: Calathes, Jokubaitis 5 PIR: Laprovíttola 27 | Arena: WiZink Center; Attendance: 9,131; Referees: Ilija Belošević, Fernando Rocha, Tomislav Hordov |

| 24 February 2022 27 | Žalgiris (Lithuania) | 68–47 | (Spain) Real Madrid | Kaunas |
| 19:00 | Scoring by quarter: 18–11, 20–18, 11–8, 19–10 |
| | Pts: Ulanovas 15; Rebs: Nebo 9 Asts: Lekavičius 4 PIR: Ulanovas 17 | Boxscore | Pts: Tavares 12; Rebs: Tavares 12; Asts: Llull 4 PIR: Tavares 20 | Arena: Žalgirio arena Attendance: 6,589; Referees: Emin Moğulkoç, Uroš Nikolić, Igor Dragojević |

| 8 March 2022 20 | Crvena zvezda mts (Serbia) | 65–62 | (Spain) Real Madrid | Belgrade |
| 19:00 | Scoring by quarter: 16–15, 19–13, 8–14, 22–20 |
| | Pts: Ivanović, Davidovac 13; Rebs: Kalinić 5 Asts: Hollins, Wolters 2 PIR: Davidovac 13 | Boxscore | Pts: Llull 20; Rebs: Tavares 11; Asts: Hanga, Heurtel 5 PIR: Tavares 19 | Arena: Aleksandar Nikolić Hall; Attendance: 6,225; Referees: Mehdi Difallah, Elias Koromilas, Arturas Šukys |
Note: The match, originally scheduled for 11 January 2022, was postponed due to a COVID-19 outbreak within Zvezda's squad.

| 10 March 2022 29 | Real Madrid (Spain) | 92–88(OT) | (Italy) A|X Armani Exchange Milan | Madrid |
| 20:45 | Scoring by quarter: 25–16, 16–25, 23–23, 17–17, Overtime: 11–7 |
| | Pts: Llull 20; Rebs: Tavares 9 Asts: Fernández 3 PIR: Deck 22 | Boxscore | Pts: Hall 21; Rebs: Melli 8 Asts: Delaney 6 PIR: Melli 24 | Arena: WiZink Center; Attendance: 6,258; Referees: Oļegs Latiševs, Gytis Vilius, Joseph Bissang |

| 17 March 2022 30 | Real Madrid (Spain) | 70–58 | (France) LDLC ASVEL | Madrid |
| 20:45 | Scoring by quarter: 20–14, 16–16, 15–17, 19–11 |
| | Pts: Fernández 17; Rebs: Poirier 12; Asts: Heurtel 7 PIR: Fernández 24 | Boxscore | Pts: Jones 17; Rebs: Jones 5 Asts: Jones 3 PIR: Jones 21 | Arena: WiZink Center; Attendance: 4,326; Referees: Sreten Radović, Fernando Rocha, Rain Peerandi |

| 22 March 2022 31 | Anadolu Efes (Turkey) | 93–90 | (Spain) Real Madrid | Istanbul |
| 18:30 | Scoring by quarter: 19–21, 25–30, 28–28, 21–11 |
| | Pts: Micić 29; Rebs: Moerman 6 Asts: Micić 6 PIR: Micić 29 | Boxscore | Pts: Deck 23; Rebs: Deck 10; Asts: Williams-Goss 7 PIR: Deck 31 | Arena: Sinan Erdem Dome; Attendance: 15,092; Referees: Borys Ryzhyk, Uroš Nikolić, Damir Javor |

| 24 March 2022 32 | Maccabi Playtika Tel Aviv (Israel) | 75–74 | (Spain) Real Madrid | Tel Aviv |
| 20:05 | Scoring by quarter: 20–21, 21–23, 18–22, 16–8 |
| | Pts: Evans 19; Rebs: Nunnally 8 Asts: Wilbekin, Nunnally 4 PIR: Evans 23 | Boxscore | Pts: Yabusele 14; Rebs: Tavares 12; Asts: Heurtel 5 PIR: Poirier 20 | Arena: Menora Mivtachim Arena; Attendance: 10,290; Referees: Robert Lottermoser, Carmelo Paternicò, Sašo Petek |

| 31 March 2022 33 | Panathinaikos OPAP (Greece) | 87–86 | (Spain) Real Madrid | Athens |
| 20:00 | Scoring by quarter: 22–11, 19–21, 18–22, 28–32 |
| | Pts: Papagiannis 18; Rebs: Papagiannis 10; Asts: Nedović 6 PIR: Papagiannis 30 | Boxscore | Pts: Heurtel 18; Rebs: Tavares 12; Asts: Fernández 6 PIR: Tavares 26 | Arena: OAKA Altion; Attendance: 2,682; Referees: Matej Boltauzer, Oļegs Latiševs, Emin Moğulkoç |

| 7 April 2022 34 | Real Madrid (Spain) | 88–97 | (Germany) Bayern Munich | Madrid |
| 20:45 | Scoring by quarter: 24–17, 28–17, 23–25, 13–38 |
| | Pts: four players 12; Rebs: Deck 5 Asts: Llull 5 PIR: Deck 17 | Boxscore | Pts: Jaramaz 19; Rebs: Hunter 6 Asts: Šiško 3 PIR: Jaramaz 28 | Arena: WiZink Center; Attendance: 6,796; Referees: Sreten Radović, Ilija Belošević, Rain Peerandi |

| 28 | CSKA Moscow (Russia) | Not played | (Spain) Real Madrid | Moscow |
| | | | | Arena: Megasport Arena |
Note: On 28 February 2022, Euroleague Basketball suspended participation of Russian teams following the Russian invasion of Ukraine.

=== EuroLeague Playoffs ===
==== Quarterfinals ====
Win Loss

| 20 April 2022 1 | Real Madrid (Spain) | 84–74 | (Israel) Maccabi Playtika Tel Aviv | Madrid |
| 21:00 | Scoring by quarter: 25–19, 22–19, 18–18, 19–18 |
| | Pts: Causeur 20; Rebs: Tavares 6 Asts: Williams-Goss 8 PIR: Causeur 21 | Boxscore | Pts: Wilbekin 20; Rebs: Sorkin 5 Asts: Wilbekin, DiBartolomeo 3 PIR: Wilbekin 21 | Arena: WiZink Center; Attendance: 7,634; Referees: Luigi Lamonica, Gytis Vilius, Fernando Rocha |

| 22 April 2022 2 | Real Madrid (Spain) | 95–66 | (Israel) Maccabi Playtika Tel Aviv | Madrid |
| 20:45 | Scoring by quarter: 35–26, 21–11, 18–11, 21–18 |
| | Pts: Llull 17; Rebs: Poirier 10; Asts: four players 3 PIR: Poirier 31 | Boxscore | Pts: Evans 9 Rebs: Reynolds 5 Asts: three players 2 PIR: DiBartolomeo 10 | Arena: WiZink Center; Attendance: 8,046; Referees: Borys Ryzhyk, Mehdi Difallah, Robert Lottermoser |

| 26 April 2022 3 | Maccabi Playtika Tel Aviv (Israel) | 76–87 | (Spain) Real Madrid | Tel Aviv |
| 20:15 | Scoring by quarter: 22–25, 19–26, 20–22, 15–14 |
| | Pts: Wilbekin 22; Rebs: Nunnally 5 Asts: Nunnally, Wilbekin 3 PIR: Wilbekin 16 | Boxscore | Pts: Llull 18; Rebs: Hanga 10; Asts: Llull 6 PIR: Yabusele 25 | Arena: Menora Mivtachim Arena; Attendance: 10,360; Referees: Damir Javor, Tomislav Hordov, Uroš Nikolić |

=== EuroLeague Final Four ===
Win Loss

| 19 May 2022 Semifinal | Barcelona (Spain) | 83–86 | (Spain) Real Madrid | Belgrade |
| 21:00 | Scoring by quarter: 19–19, 26–15, 11–26, 27–26 |
| | Pts: Mirotić 26; Rebs: Mirotić 12; Asts: Calathes 9 PIR: Mirotić 39 | Boxscore | Pts: Yabusele, Causeur 18; Rebs: Yabusele 8 Asts: Hanga, Llull 3 PIR: Yabusele 24 | Arena: Štark Arena; Attendance: 13,173; Referees: Luigi Lamonica, Ilija Belošević, Mehdi Difallah |

| 21 May 2022 Final | Real Madrid (Spain) | 57–58 | (Turkey) Anadolu Efes | Belgrade |
| 19:00 | Scoring by quarter: 15–14, 19–15, 8–11, 15–18 |
| | Pts: Tavares 14; Rebs: Tavares 11; Asts: Llull 6 PIR: Tavares 20 | Boxscore | Pts: Micić 23; Rebs: Bryant 8 Asts: Larkin 4 PIR: Pleiß 24 | Arena: Štark Arena; Attendance: 15,000; Referees: Luigi Lamonica, Borys Ryzhyk, Gytis Vilius |

=== Copa del Rey ===
Win Loss

| 17 February 2022 Quarterfinal | Real Madrid | 73–67 | Río Breogán | Granada |
| 21:30 | Scoring by quarter: 27–16, 14–15, 16–19, 16–17 |
| | Pts: Yabusele 17; Rebs: Tavares 11; Asts: Heurtel 10; PIR: Tavares 22 | Boxscore | Pts: Mahalbašić 16; Rebs: Musa 9 Asts: Musa 4 PIR: Musa 18 | Arena: Palacio de Deportes; Attendance: 6,319; Referees: Daniel Hierrezuelo, Carlos Peruga, Jordi Aliaga |

| 19 February 2022 Semifinal | Real Madrid | 94–74 | Lenovo Tenerife | Granada |
| 18:30 | Scoring by quarter: 26–20, 24–18, 23–17, 21–19 |
| | Pts: Tavares 15; Rebs: Yabusele, Fernández 5 Asts: Heurtel 7 PIR: Tavares 19 | Boxscore | Pts: Shermadini 14; Rebs: Wiltjer 6 Asts: Sastre 4 PIR: Shermadini 15 | Arena: Palacio de Deportes; Attendance: 6,918; Referees: Carlos Peruga, Benjamín Jiménez, Óscar Perea |

| 20 February 2022 Final | Real Madrid | 59–64 | Barça | Granada |
| 18:30 | Scoring by quarter: 19–5, 10–13, 17–23, 13–23 |
| | Pts: Heurtel 10; Rebs: three players 5 Asts: Abalde 2 PIR: Hanga, Taylor 7 | Boxscore | Pts: Mirotić 19; Rebs: Şanlı 6 Asts: Calathes 6 PIR: Mirotić 19 | Arena: Palacio de Deportes; Attendance: 6,918; Referees: Emilio Pérez Pizarro, Antonio Conde, Fernando Calatrava |

=== Supercopa de España ===
| 11 September 2021 Semifinal | Lenovo Tenerife | 70–72 | Real Madrid | San Cristóbal de La Laguna |
| 22:00 | Scoring by quarter: 21–14, 16–17, 16–17, 17–24 |
| | Pts: Shermadini 21; Rebs: Doornekamp 6 Asts: Huertas 6 PIR: Shermadini 21 | Boxscore | Pts: Yabusele 15; Rebs: Yabusele 8 Asts: Heurtel 3 PIR: Yabusele 17 | Arena: Santiago Martín; Attendance: 2,200; Referees: Antonio Conde, Fernando Calatrava, Arnau Padrós |

| 12 September 2021 Final | Barça | 83–88 | Real Madrid | San Cristóbal de La Laguna |
| 18:30 | Scoring by quarter: 23–22, 23–18, 25–22, 12–26 |
| | Pts: Higgins 16; Rebs: Oriola, Mirotić 5 Asts: Calathes 7 PIR: Calathes 18 | Boxscore | Pts: Llull 24; Rebs: Poirier 11; Asts: Williams-Goss, Yabusele 3 PIR: Llull 27 | Arena: Santiago Martín; Attendance: 2,200; Referees: Emilio Pérez Pizarro, Carlos Peruga, Luis Miguel Castillo |

== Statistics ==
=== Liga ACB ===
| Player | GP | GS | MPG | 2FG% | 3FG% | FT% | RPG | APG | SPG | BPG | PPG | PIR |
|---|---|---|---|---|---|---|---|---|---|---|---|---|
| Edy Tavares | 42 | 39 | 21:45 | 66.1% | – | 75% | 7.1 | 1 | 0.5 | 1.9 | 10.3 | 17 |
| Vincent Poirier | 43 | 4 | 17:58 | 58.5% | 14.3% | 79.4% | 5.8 | 0.6 | 0.8 | 1.2 | 8.7 | 13.5 |
| Guerschon Yabusele | 42 | 40 | 26:10 | 56.1% | 39.6% | 77.7% | 4.5 | 1.5 | 0.9 | 0.4 | 10.9 | 13.2 |
| Gabriel Deck | 23 | 14 | 22:59 | 56% | 40.8% | 87.7% | 4.8 | 1.7 | 0.4 | – | 10.1 | 12 |
| Ádám Hanga | 37 | 29 | 20:08 | 53.1% | 35.9% | 73.9% | 3.1 | 1.7 | 0.8 | 0.4 | 8.5 | 9.7 |
| Thomas Heurtel | 26 | 10 | 17:44 | 39.2% | 46.1% | 88% | 2.4 | 4.2 | 0.5 | – | 8.3 | 9 |
| Nigel Williams-Goss | 27 | 17 | 18:52 | 56.1% | 29.5% | 83.3% | 2.3 | 1.9 | 0.7 | – | 7.4 | 7.7 |
| Sergio Llull | 38 | 2 | 17:14 | 38.8% | 34% | 81.8% | 1.4 | 2.4 | 0.2 | – | 9.2 | 6.9 |
| Fabien Causeur | 36 | 24 | 19:26 | 53.1% | 33.9% | 82.2% | 2.2 | 1.1 | 0.9 | 0.1 | 7.8 | 6.8 |
| Alberto Abalde | 31 | 16 | 17:35 | 47.3% | 32.2% | 87.2% | 2.4 | 1.6 | 0.4 | – | 6.1 | 6.1 |
| Rudy Fernández | 29 | 0 | 15:38 | 38.9% | 34.1% | 72.4% | 2.3 | 1.4 | 0.7 | 0.1 | 6.1 | 6 |
| Anthony Randolph | 25 | 2 | 11:29 | 52.5% | 34.9% | 88.2% | 2.2 | 0.2 | 0.3 | 0.4 | 4.9 | 4.7 |
| Jeffery Taylor | 33 | 11 | 16:18 | 57.5% | 34.6% | 57.1% | 1.6 | 0.7 | 0.7 | 0.1 | 4.2 | 2.8 |
| Tristan Vukčević | 12 | 2 | 8:58 | 61.1% | 26.7% | 41.7% | 2.2 | 0.3 | 0.2 | – | 3.3 | 2.7 |
| Carlos Alocén | 11 | 2 | 10:11 | 31.3% | 31.8% | 62.5% | 1.2 | 0.9 | 0.5 | – | 3.3 | 2.5 |
| Trey Thompkins | 3 | 0 | 18:05 | 50% | 30% | 100% | 0.7 | 0.7 | 0.3 | – | 5.3 | 1.3 |
| Juan Núñez | 22 | 3 | 6:01 | 26.1% | 16.7% | 54.5% | 0.5 | 0.8 | 0.1 | – | 1.1 | 0.2 |
| Urban Klavžar | 2 | 0 | 3:14 | – | – | – | – | – | – | – | – | -3 |
| Eli Ndiaye | 1 | 0 | 0:58 | 100% | – | – | – | – | – | – | 2 | 2 |
| TOTAL | | | | 53.6% | 35.3% | 78.3% | 38.2 | 15.7 | 6.7 | 4.4 | 83.7 | 97.2 |

Source: ACB

=== EuroLeague ===
| Player | GP | GS | MPG | 2FG% | 3FG% | FT% | RPG | APG | SPG | BPG | PPG | PIR |
|---|---|---|---|---|---|---|---|---|---|---|---|---|
| Edy Tavares | 35 | 34 | 22:58 | 68.8% | – | 75% | 7.5 | 1 | 0.9 | 1.7 | 10.9 | 18.4 |
| Vincent Poirier | 37 | 5 | 17:58 | 58.3% | – | 77.3% | 5.5 | 0.9 | 0.8 | 0.9 | 7.4 | 11.7 |
| Guerschon Yabusele | 36 | 34 | 27:35 | 56.9% | 40.5% | 80% | 4.8 | 1.5 | 1 | 0.2 | 11.9 | 13.5 |
| Gabriel Deck | 11 | 9 | 25:24 | 60% | 46.7% | 82.6% | 4.8 | 0.8 | 0.6 | – | 9.5 | 11.1 |
| Ádám Hanga | 31 | 26 | 18:51 | 51.6% | 30.4% | 71.4% | 3.1 | 1.7 | 0.6 | 0.4 | 5.8 | 6.6 |
| Thomas Heurtel | 27 | 14 | 19:20 | 43.9% | 39.4% | 81.3% | 2.4 | 4.6 | 0.6 | – | 9 | 9.7 |
| Nigel Williams-Goss | 29 | 16 | 16:34 | 43.2% | 31.6% | 80% | 2.1 | 2.4 | 0.3 | – | 5.8 | 5.6 |
| Sergio Llull | 36 | 2 | 19:45 | 37.1% | 29.6% | 68.4% | 1.7 | 2.8 | 0.5 | – | 8.8 | 6.4 |
| Fabien Causeur | 28 | 18 | 20:03 | 59.3% | 44.1% | 71.4% | 1.6 | 1.4 | 0.4 | 0.1 | 8.5 | 6.7 |
| Alberto Abalde | 30 | 19 | 18:46 | 43.3% | 32% | 72.7% | 3 | 1.5 | 0.5 | – | 6 | 5.4 |
| Rudy Fernández | 34 | 0 | 18:30 | 55.6% | 32.7% | 75% | 3 | 2 | 0.9 | 0.2 | 6 | 7.5 |
| Anthony Randolph | 17 | 1 | 9:01 | 54.5% | 33.3% | 85.7% | 2.2 | 0.2 | 0.1 | 0.2 | 3.6 | 4.1 |
| Jeffery Taylor | 23 | 8 | 13:04 | 55.6% | 43.8% | 100% | 1.2 | 0.7 | 0.3 | 0.1 | 3.3 | 2.1 |
| Tristan Vukčević | 9 | 1 | 6:34 | 44.4% | 30% | 50% | 1.2 | 0.2 | – | 0.1 | 2.1 | 1.6 |
| Carlos Alocén | 9 | 2 | 10:46 | 35.3% | 11.1% | 81.8% | 1.3 | 1.5 | 0.3 | – | 2.7 | 2.4 |
| Trey Thompkins | 13 | 0 | 12:53 | 36.7% | 50% | 100% | 2.2 | 0.6 | 0.4 | 0.2 | 5.7 | 3.8 |
| Juan Núñez | 10 | 0 | 4:36 | 30.8% | 66.7% | – | 0.2 | 0.8 | 0.3 | – | 1.4 | 0.6 |
| Urban Klavžar | 1 | 0 | 22:53 | 50% | 66.7% | – | 1 | – | – | – | 10 | 7 |
| Eli Ndiaye | 4 | 0 | 3:37 | 100% | – | – | 0.2 | 0.2 | 0.2 | – | 1 | 1.5 |
| Sediq Garuba | 2 | 1 | 8:02 | 33.3% | – | – | 0.5 | – | 0.5 | – | 1 | -1 |
| Baba Miller | 1 | 0 | 1:54 | – | – | – | 1 | – | – | – | – | -1 |
| TOTAL | | | | 53.1% | 35.4% | 76.4% | 38.3 | 18.1 | 6.3 | 3.3 | 78.9 | 91.2 |

Source: EuroLeague

=== Copa del Rey ===
| Player | GP | GS | MPG | 2FG% | 3FG% | FT% | RPG | APG | SPG | BPG | PPG | PIR |
|---|---|---|---|---|---|---|---|---|---|---|---|---|
| Edy Tavares | 3 | 2 | 22:45 | 63.2% | – | 58.3% | 6 | 0.3 | 0.3 | 2.7 | 10.3 | 13.7 |
| Guerschon Yabusele | 3 | 3 | 25:37 | 50% | 66.7% | 66.7% | 5 | 2 | 1.7 | 0.3 | 8.7 | 13.7 |
| Thomas Heurtel | 3 | 1 | 20:05 | 66.7% | 33.3% | 80% | 2.7 | 6 | – | – | 11.3 | 13 |
| Vincent Poirier | 3 | 1 | 16:03 | 66.7% | – | 100% | 2 | 1 | – | 0.7 | 6 | 8 |
| Alberto Abalde | 3 | 3 | 18:10 | 53.8% | 42.9% | 100% | 1.7 | 1.3 | 1.7 | – | 8.7 | 8 |
| Jeffery Taylor | 2 | 2 | 21:28 | 100% | 50% | – | 2.5 | 1 | 1.5 | 0.5 | 7 | 8 |
| Rudy Fernández | 2 | 0 | 12:20 | 66.7% | 30% | 50% | 3.5 | 0.5 | 0.5 | – | 7 | 6 |
| Trey Thompkins | 3 | 0 | 13:10 | 40% | 60% | 100% | 0.3 | – | 0.7 | 0.7 | 4.7 | 5 |
| Nigel Williams-Goss | 1 | 0 | 11:58 | – | 100% | – | 1 | 1 | 2 | – | 3 | 4 |
| Fabien Causeur | 2 | 2 | 23:36 | 40% | 16.7% | 66.7% | 2 | 1 | 1 | – | 5.5 | 4 |
| Ádám Hanga | 3 | 0 | 13:45 | 50% | 37.5% | – | 1 | 0.7 | 0.7 | – | 3.7 | 2.7 |
| Sergio Llull | 3 | 0 | 13:12 | 57.1% | 9.1% | 75% | 1 | 1.7 | 0.7 | – | 4.7 | 1.3 |
| Gabriel Deck | 2 | 1 | 22:22 | 44.4% | – | 66.7% | 2.5 | 0.5 | 0.5 | – | 5 | 0.5 |
| TOTAL | | | | 58.2% | 36% | 67.4% | 32 | 15.3 | 9 | 4.7 | 75.3 | 81.3 |

Source: ACB
