= Belmont station (Metra) =

Commuter rail station in Downers Grove, Illinois

Belmont

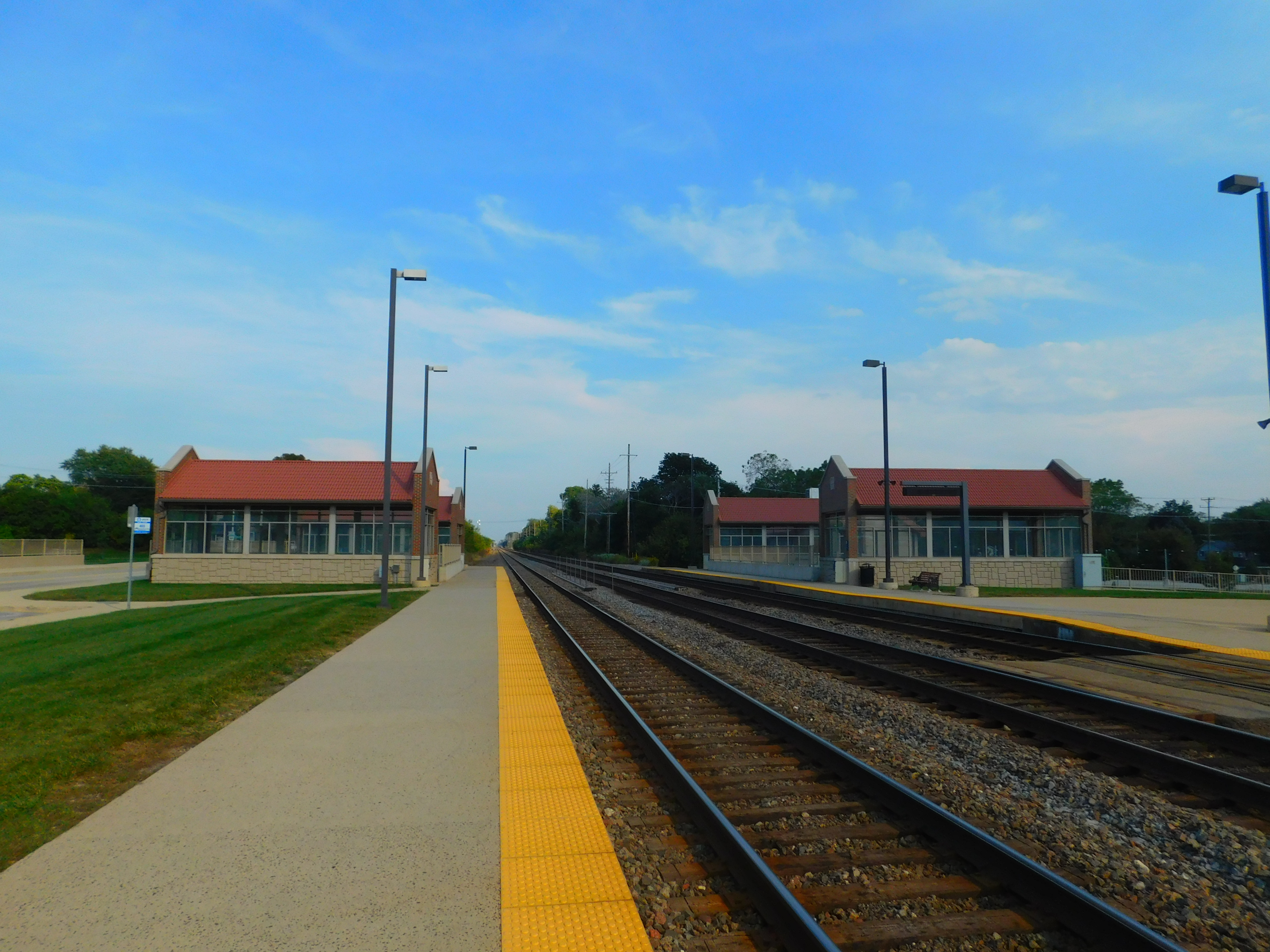
- The station at Belmont in September 2016

General information
- Location: 5000 Belmont Road; Belmont, Illinois
- Coordinates: 41.7952°N 88.0381°W
- Owner: Metra
- Line: BNSF Chicago Subdivision
- Platforms: 2 side platforms (1 island platform demolished)
- Tracks: 3

Construction
- Parking: Yes; Vendors
- Accessible: Yes

Other information
- Fare zone: 4

History
- Opened: 1996
- Rebuilt: 2010-2012

Passengers
- 2018: 1,408 (average weekday) ▼4.3%
- Rank: 25 out of 236

Services
Preceding station	Metra	Following station
Lisle toward Aurora	BNSF	Downers Grove toward Union Station
Former services
Preceding station	Burlington Route	Following station
Lisle toward Aurora	Suburban Service	Downers Grove Main Street toward Chicago
Track layout
Location

Belmont is a railway station on Metra's BNSF Line located on the outskirts of Downers Grove, Illinois in the small community of Belmont. The station is on Belmont Road 22.9 miles (36.9 km) from Union Station, the east end of the line. As of 2018, Belmont is the 25th busiest of Metra's 236 non-downtown stations, with an average of 1,408 weekday boardings.

Unlike the stations at Main Street and Fairview Avenue, Belmont has parking vendors.

The station underwent major renovations in the late 2000s. In order to reduce level crossing accidents, the crossing was grade-separated, and the road was redirected under the railway line. Demolition began in late 2008, construction started in 2010, and the new underpass and pedestrian tunnel opened in 2012. The $60 million project was funded by Metra, BNSF, DuPage County, and the State of Illinois.

As of September 8, 2025, Belmont is served by 65 trains (32 inbound, 33 outbound) on weekdays, and by all 40 trains (20 in each direction) on weekends and holidays.
