= Lisle Community Unit School District 202 =

School district in Illinois, USA

Address
- 5211 Center Avenue Lisle, Illinois, 60532; United States

District information
- Type: Public
- Grades: PreK–12
- NCES District ID: 1723200

Students and staff
- Students: 1,468

Other information
- Website: lisle202.org

Lisle Community Unit School District 202 (Lisle CUSD 202) is a school district headquartered in Lisle, Illinois.

== Schools ==
- Lisle High School
- Lisle Junior High School
- Lisle Elementary School
