= Lisle, Illinois =

- Village
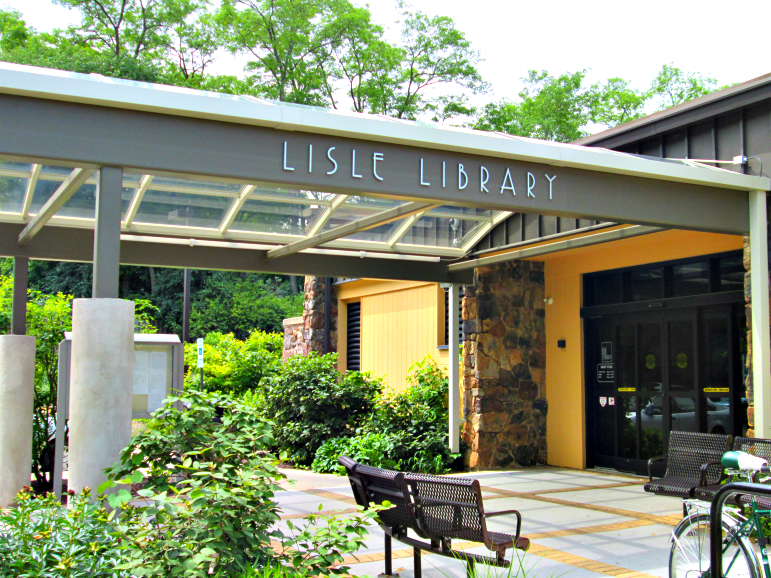
- Lisle Library District entrance canopy
- Motto: "The Arboretum Village"
- Location of Lisle in DuPage County, Illinois.
- Coordinates: 41°47′31″N 88°05′20″W
- Country: United States
- State: Illinois
- County: DuPage
- Townships: Lisle, Milton
- Settled: 1832
- Incorporated: June 26, 1956

Government
  - Type: Mayor–council

Area
  - Total: 7.08 sq mi (18.35 km^{2})
  - Land: 6.90 sq mi (17.88 km^{2})
  - Water: 0.18 sq mi (0.47 km^{2})
- Elevation: 673 ft (205 m)

Population (2020)
  - Total: 24,223
  - Density: 3,509.3/sq mi (1,354.95/km^{2})
- Time zone: UTC-6 (CST)
  - Summer (DST): UTC-5 (CDT)
- ZIP code: 60532
- Area codes: 630, 331
- FIPS code: 17-43939
- GNIS feature ID: 2398450
- Website: www.villageoflisle.org

Lisle (/ˈlaɪəl/ LY-əl) is a village in DuPage County, Illinois, United States. As of the 2020 census, Lisle had a population of 24,223. It is a south-western suburb of Chicago in the Illinois Technology and Research Corridor. It is also the headquarters of the Nuclear Regulatory Commission Region III.

== History ==
In 1830, Bailey Hobson, a Quaker, was the first settler in what would become DuPage County, Illinois, as well as Lisle Township. The town of Lisle was settled in 1832, by brothers James C. Hatch and Luther A. Hatch after the close of the Black Hawk War. The two brothers acquired land near what is now Ogden Avenue and began a small farming community named "DuPage" or "East DuPage" because, of its proximity to the east branch of the DuPage River.

In 1831, DuPage County was founded. To the west of the Lisle settlement, on the west branch of the DuPage river, brothers Joseph and John Naper founded Naper's Settlement, present-day Naperville, Illinois.

Lisle experienced many firsts in the decade of 1830s during the earliest years of settlement in DuPage County. In 1832, James C. Hatch set aside some of his land for the first and only community burial ground in the East DuPage Settlement. Today, Lisle Cemetery is one of the oldest registered cemeteries in the state of Illinois. Hatch operated the first wagon and blacksmith shop and began Lisle's infant dairy industry with a creamery. Formed in 1833, the East DuPage Religious Society had a circuit rider preacher with house churches and was the first Christian organization in DuPage County, which later became the First Congregational Church of DuPage in 1842. The first post office was managed by John Thompson in 1834, and the first log schoolhouse was constructed in that same year and later replaced, in 1837, with a frame structure.

In 1849, DuPage County formed its first townships, and the name Lisle was first proposed by early settler Alonzo B. Chatfield of Lisle, New York; the proposal was accepted, creating the Lisle Township. The village was incorporated on June 26, 1956, and was also named after Lisle, New York. Another reason for the DuPage township name change was that there was another town in Will County with the name DuPage.

Another story of the origin of the Lisle name was that the town was named after the late S. Lisle Smith of Chicago.

In 1864, the Chicago, Burlington and Quincy Railroad arrived along with a newly constructed depot. In 1874, a fire destroyed the Lisle Station depot, but it was later rebuilt by the CB&Q Railroad. Today, commuter rail service is provided by Metra.

On July 4, 2006, Lisle celebrated its 50th birthday by hosting the state's biggest fireworks display.

== Geography ==
According to the 2021 census gazetteer files, Lisle has a total area of 7.08 square miles (18.34 km^{2}), of which 6.90 square miles (17.87 km^{2}) (or 97.44%) is land and 0.18 square miles (0.47 km^{2}) (or 2.56%) is water. Most of Lisle lies within the watershed of the east branch of the DuPage River.

=== Climate ===
Climate data for Lisle, Illinois (Morton Arboretum) (1991–2020 normals, extremes 1936–present)
Month	Jan	Feb	Mar	Apr	May	Jun	Jul	Aug	Sep	Oct	Nov	Dec	Year
Record high °F (°C)	65 (18)	74 (23)	86 (30)	91 (33)	97 (36)	103 (39)	105 (41)	100 (38)	102 (39)	90 (32)	78 (26)	70 (21)	105 (41)
Mean maximum °F (°C)	53.0 (11.7)	57.1 (13.9)	70.8 (21.6)	80.8 (27.1)	89.2 (31.8)	93.9 (34.4)	94.7 (34.8)	93.3 (34.1)	90.0 (32.2)	82.8 (28.2)	68.5 (20.3)	56.5 (13.6)	96.2 (35.7)
Mean daily maximum °F (°C)	31.5 (−0.3)	35.2 (1.8)	47.2 (8.4)	59.2 (15.1)	70.6 (21.4)	80.7 (27.1)	84.4 (29.1)	82.7 (28.2)	76.0 (24.4)	62.6 (17.0)	48.4 (9.1)	36.6 (2.6)	59.6 (15.3)
Daily mean °F (°C)	23.1 (−4.9)	26.4 (−3.1)	36.7 (2.6)	47.7 (8.7)	59.0 (15.0)	69.3 (20.7)	73.1 (22.8)	71.4 (21.9)	64.2 (17.9)	51.5 (10.8)	39.2 (4.0)	28.6 (−1.9)	49.2 (9.6)
Mean daily minimum °F (°C)	14.7 (−9.6)	17.7 (−7.9)	26.1 (−3.3)	36.1 (2.3)	47.4 (8.6)	57.9 (14.4)	61.8 (16.6)	60.2 (15.7)	52.3 (11.3)	40.4 (4.7)	29.9 (−1.2)	20.6 (−6.3)	38.8 (3.8)
Mean minimum °F (°C)	−6.6 (−21.4)	−2.9 (−19.4)	9.1 (−12.7)	22.0 (−5.6)	32.6 (0.3)	43.0 (6.1)	50.5 (10.3)	49.8 (9.9)	37.5 (3.1)	26.5 (−3.1)	14.7 (−9.6)	1.6 (−16.9)	−10.5 (−23.6)
Record low °F (°C)	−26 (−32)	−25 (−32)	−12 (−24)	4 (−16)	22 (−6)	32 (0)	41 (5)	38 (3)	26 (−3)	14 (−10)	−4 (−20)	−21 (−29)	−26 (−32)
Average precipitation inches (mm)	2.19 (56)	1.96 (50)	2.36 (60)	3.82 (97)	4.79 (122)	4.43 (113)	4.25 (108)	4.35 (110)	3.36 (85)	3.58 (91)	2.77 (70)	2.32 (59)	40.18 (1,021)
Source: NOAA

== Demographics ==
Historical population
Census	Pop.	Note	%±
1880	48		—
1960	4,219		—
1970	5,329		26.3%
1980	13,638		155.9%
1990	19,512		43.1%
2000	21,182		8.6%
2010	22,390		5.7%
2020	24,223		8.2%
U.S. Decennial Census

=== Racial and ethnic composition ===
Lisle village, Illinois – Racial and ethnic composition Note: the US Census treats Hispanic/Latino as an ethnic category. This table excludes Latinos from the racial categories and assigns them to a separate category. Hispanics/Latinos may be of any race.
Race / Ethnicity (NH = Non-Hispanic)	Pop 2000	Pop 2010	Pop 2020	% 2000	% 2010	% 2020
White alone (NH)	16,954	16,398	15,927	80.04%	73.24%	65.75%
Black or African American alone (NH)	727	1,214	1,447	3.43%	5.42%	5.97%
Native American or Alaska Native alone (NH)	31	13	27	0.15%	0.06%	0.11%
Asian alone (NH)	2,052	2,665	3,680	9.69%	11.90%	15.19%
Pacific Islander alone (NH)	3	5	7	0.01%	0.02%	0.03%
Other race alone (NH)	6	31	102	0.03%	0.14%	0.42%
Mixed race or Multiracial (NH)	246	374	870	1.16%	1.67%	3.59%
Hispanic or Latino (any race)	1,163	1,690	2,163	5.49%	7.55%	8.93%
Total	21,182	22,390	24,223	100.00%	100.00%	100.00%

=== 2020 census ===
As of the 2020 census, Lisle had a population of 24,223. The median age was 39.0 years. 19.2% of residents were under the age of 18 and 17.0% of residents were 65 years of age or older. For every 100 females there were 96.2 males, and for every 100 females age 18 and over there were 92.7 males age 18 and over.

100.0% of residents lived in urban areas, while 0.0% lived in rural areas.

There were 10,285 households in Lisle, of which 25.9% had children under the age of 18 living in them. Of all households, 45.7% were married-couple households, 20.9% were households with a male householder and no spouse or partner present, and 27.4% were households with a female householder and no spouse or partner present. About 35.2% of all households were made up of individuals and 12.3% had someone living alone who was 65 years of age or older.

There were 10,965 housing units, of which 6.2% were vacant. The homeowner vacancy rate was 1.0% and the rental vacancy rate was 7.3%.

The population density was 3,419.88 inhabitants per square mile (1,320.42/km^{2}). The housing unit density was 1,548.07 per square mile (597.71/km^{2}).

=== Demographic estimates ===
The average household size was 3.09 and the average family size was 2.30.

The village's age distribution consisted of 10.6% from 18 to 24, 28.8% from 25 to 44, and 24.1% from 45 to 64.

=== Income and poverty ===
The median income for a household in the village was $96,945, and the median income for a family was $133,133. Males had a median income of $67,435 versus $49,270 for females. The per capita income for the village was $50,750. About 2.6% of families and 5.7% of the population were below the poverty line, including 6.2% of those under age 18 and 3.7% of those age 65 or over.

== Economy ==
CA Technologies, Molex, Armour-Eckrich, and Navistar are among the largest companies based in Lisle.

=== Top employers ===
According to the Village's 2023 Annual Comprehensive Financial Report, the top ten employers in the city are:

#	Employer	# of Employees
1	Footprint Acquisition	3,200
2	Amita Alexian Brothers Foundation	2,720
3	HGS, LLC	1,500
4	Molex	1,100
5	Navistar	1,000
6	Kantar Operations	1,000
7	CTS Advanced Materials LLC	729
8	Kone, Inc	580
9	Serene Ast, LLC	528
10	Bolingbrook Communications, Inc.	510

== Arts and culture ==
=== Points of interest ===
- The Lisle Library contains resources and hosts art exhibits.
- Jurica-Suchy Nature Museum.
- Morton Arboretum
- Pioneer Village Museum at Lisle Station Park.
- Created by the Chicago Bulls and White Sox, the Bulls/Sox Training Academy runs year-round training programs in baseball, fastpitch softball, and basketball for youths.

== Education ==
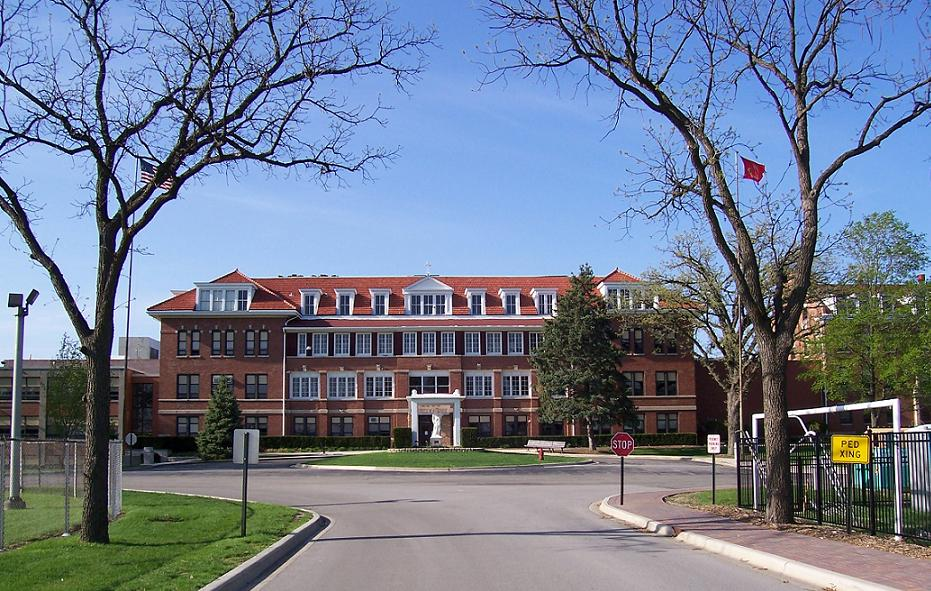
Lisle is home to Benet Academy, a private high school

=== Primary and secondary schools ===
Lisle's school district is Lisle Community Unit School District 202; a portion of Lisle lies in the Naperville Community Unit School District 203. The majority of high school students living in Lisle attend Lisle Senior High School.

Middle schools:

- Kennedy Junior High School (serving District 203)
- Lisle Junior High (serving District 202)
- St. Joan of Arc (Grades PreK-8)

High schools:

- Lisle High School (serving District 202)
- Chesterton Academy of the Holy Family (Catholic)
- Benet Academy (Catholic - Benedictine)

=== Colleges and universities ===
- Benedictine University, formerly known as Illinois Benedictine College, has its 108-acre (44 ha) campus in Lisle.
- National Louis University is located on Warrenville Road in Lisle.
- The Center for Entrepreneurship of the College of DuPage is located in the One Corporate Lakes building in Lisle.
- Universal Technical Institute is located off of Warrenville Road in Lisle. The Lisle campus trains students for careers in Automotive, Diesel and Welding.

== Transportation ==
The Lisle station provides Metra commuter rail service along the BNSF Line. Trains connect Lisle to Chicago Union Station, Aurora Transportation Center and points in between.

Pace provides bus service on Route 722 connecting Lisle to Naperville and other destinations.

In the 1990s, Lisle was one of six communities that competed to receive a prototype personal rapid transit system that the Regional Transit Authority was planning to build. A proposal by Rosemont was instead selected, and such a system was ultimately never built.

== Notable people ==
- Glenn Earl, safety for the professional American football team, Houston Texans
- John Grochowski, Chicago Sun-Times newspaper columnist
- Frank Kaminsky, Charlotte Hornets center and Benet Academy graduate
- Lester Lewis, television writer for various sitcoms
- Joy Morton, founder of Morton Salt Company and Morton Arboretum
- Brian Plotkin, midfielder with professional American soccer teams

== See also ==
- List of towns and villages in Illinois

== Bibliography ==
- Blanchard, Rufus. History of Du Page County, Illinois. Chicago: O.L. Baskin & Co. 1882.
- Richmond, C. W. History of Du Page County Illinois, Du Page County (Ill.) Chicago: Richmond Knickerbocker & Hodder, 1877.
- Richmond, C.W. and Henry F. Valette. A history of the County of Du Page, Illinois. Chicago: Scripps, Bross & Spears, 1857.
