= John Grochowski =

American journalist

- Born: c. 1952 (age 73–74); Aurora, Illinois, U.S.
- Education: University of Illinois
- Occupation: Writer
- Website: casinoanswerman.com

John Grochowski (born c. 1952) is a gambling columnist and author. His weekly newspaper column began at the Chicago Sun-Times and was syndicated nationally. According to his LinkedIn page, he is now "mostly retired." In 1994, the monthly Las Vegas Advisor reported that Grochowski was the first casino gambling columnist at a major U.S. newspaper. In 2012, he also began a weekly Sun-Times column on baseball sabermetrics, the first of its kind in a daily newspaper.

== Early life ==
Grochowski was born in 1952 in Aurora, Illinois, and grew up in the western Chicago suburb of Lisle.The eldest of five children, he graduated from Lisle High School in 1970, then attended the University of Illinois in Urbana-Champaign. While at the University of Illinois, Grochowski joined the staff of the student newspaper, the Daily Illini, and served one year as its sports editor.

He then pursued a newspaper career, first working as a sportswriter for the Suburban Trib in Hinsdale, Illinois. From there, he moved to the Colorado Springs Gazette Telegraph in Colorado Springs, Colorado, before returning to Illinois as a sports copy editor for the News-Sun in Waukegan, Illinois. In 1982, he was hired as a copy editor by the Chicago Sun-Times, and it was there he started writing about casinos and casino games with a weekly column starting in 1994.

== Career ==
In February 2017, Grochowski was ranked No. 9 on a list of top gambling experts by GamblingSites.com. It compared Grochowski to his former Chicago Sun-Times colleague, film critic Roger Ebert, for making his specialty a topic of mainstream conversation.

He published his first gambling book in 1996 entitled Gaming: Cruising the Casino with a Syndicated Gambling Columnist. He then began a series of books all aimed at answering questions about a specific topic or game. The 1998 book The Casino Answer Book explained the basics of casino gambling for beginners. His other books include The Video Poker Answer Book 2000, The Craps Answer Book 2001 and The Slot Machine Answer Book 2005.

The author also contributes articles to magazines and internet publications. His articles can be found online at the Casino City Times website and in a number of magazines including Casino Player, Strictly Slots, Southern Gaming and Destinations and Midwest Gaming & Travel magazines for players. He also writes for a number of industry publications, including Casino Journal and Slot Manager magazines.

Grochowski was one of the first to warn players about the high house edge on games that pay 6:5 on blackjacks instead of the traditional 3:2. Advantage play expert Eliot Jacobson, PhD, wrote, In August 2002, the Flamingo and a few other strip casinos introduced 6:5 blackjack. In September, 2002, John Grochowski wrote the first article bringing the house edge for 6:5 to light, “Avoid 6-5 Single-Deck Blackjack Games.”

The author also has gone into broadcasting. His one-minute "Casino Answer Man" tips began airing on news-talk WLS-AM (890) in Chicago in July 2010. Before that, he did one-minute "Beat the Odds tips" on all-news WBBM-AM (780) and a one-hour Casino Answer Man talk show on WCKG-FM (105.9), both in Chicago. The WBBM spots aired from May 2005 through June 2010. The WCKG-FM talk show made its debut in February 2006, and last aired Oct. 28, 2007. It was canceled when the station changed formats.

Grochowski has been featured on three Travel Channel specials, Las Vegas: What Would You Do If ..., Vegas: What's New 2005 and Vegas: What's New 2006. He also had a moment in the limelight as a game show contestant, winning $125,000 in July 2000 on ABC's Who Wants to Be a Millionaire with Regis Philbin.
