= Lisle High School =

Lisle Senior High School

Location
- 5211 Center Ave. Lisle, Illinois 60532; United States; 41.7934°N 88.0836°W

Information
- School type: public, secondary
- Opened: 1956
- School district: Lisle Community SD 202
- Superintendent: Keith Filipiak
- CEEB code: 142628
- Faculty: 39.80 (FTE)
- Grades: 9-12
- Gender: coed
- Enrollment: 435 (2023-2024)
- Student to teacher ratio: 10.93
- Campus type: suburban
- Colors: navy blue white
- Fight song: On Ye Lions!
- Athletics conference: Illinois Central Eight Conference
- Team name: Lions
- Website: www.lisle202.org/lisle-high-school

Lisle High School is a public four-year high school located in Lisle, Illinois, a western suburb of Chicago, Illinois, in the United States. It is part of Lisle Community Unit School District 202.

== History ==
Lisle Community High School first opened in 1957, at the location of the current junior high. It remained there until 1974, after the elementary and high school districts merged to form Lisle Community Unit School District 202. A new building was erected for the incoming class of 1975. In 2001, the high school received a makeover. The most notable changes were: the addition of a new auditorium, eight new classrooms, new band and choir rooms, and a second gym with a balcony. The class of 2007 was the 50th class to graduate from Lisle Senior High School, and the class of 2016 graduated with a class of about 135 students.

== Academics ==
In 2017, Lisle had an average composite ACT score of 25 and graduated 96% of its senior class. Lisle has made Adequate Yearly Progress on the Prairie State Achievement Examination, a state test part of the No Child Left Behind Act. Additionally, Lisle was recently ranked 3rd in DuPage county by Chicago Magazine

The staff consists of 41 teachers; the average class size is 20.91 students.

== Athletics ==
Lisle has 24 total athletic teams: 10 boys, 3 all-inclusive, and 11 girls teams, which play in the Illinois Central Eight Conference and Illinois High School Association. Lisle's mascot is the Lions. Current sports:

- Football
- Volleyball
- Cross Country
- Tennis
- Soccer
- Golf
- Cheerleading
- Lionettes Dance team
- Basketball
- Bowling
- Wrestling
- Baseball
- Softball
- Track and field
- Scholastic Bowl

== State championships ==
Lisle Senior High won its first IHSA state championship in 1985, when the women's volleyball team won the title. Within the last few years, Lisle Senior High has had a progressive set of athletic teams. The boys' soccer team won super sectionals 2 years in a row, winning the 1A state championship in 2010, and finishing in 2nd in 2011. The girls' soccer team placed 4th in state in the 2010, 2012, and 2019 seasons. The scholastic bowl team at Lisle has won 2 state championships in a row (in 2010 and 2011), earning the school's first state title in 25 years. In 2013, the boys' baseball team won the class 2A State Title. Lisle's dance team also placed 11th in the 2A division at the 2016 state dance competition. Lisle is well known for its competitive wrestling team, which has sent many wrestlers to the state competition.

Correction: The Lisle Senior High School Chess Team won the first ISHA State Team Championship in 1972. Two of the members of the team won individual State Championships. The only defeat came when the team narrowly lost to the National Champions, a school with an enrollment of over five times the size of LSHS. The 1973 Chess Team took Third Place, with one team member winning another Individual State Championship. This was done during the height of chess popularity, when such notables as Bobby Fischer and Boris Spasky ruled the game.

== Activities ==
- Band
- Choir
- Art Club
- Key Club
- Theater
- Student Government
- Science Olympiad
- Ecology Club
- National Honors Society
- Gay Straight Alliance
- Spanish Club
- French Club
- Film Club
- Birding club
- Youth in Government Club
- Math Team - Notably successful with 16 consecutive IC8 conference championships.
- Scholastic Bowl - Quiz Bowl competition with 3 state championships(2 IHSA, 1 Masonic) 2 state 2nd place (1 IHSA and 1 Masonic) and numerous Regional and Sectional championships most recently in 2024.
- DECA
- Science Olympiad

== Notable alumni ==
- John Grochowski, author and radio personality
- Lester Lewis, television writer for The Larry Sanders Show
- Thomas Aeschi, Swiss politician and businessman
