= Guerschon Yabusele =

French basketball player (born 1995)

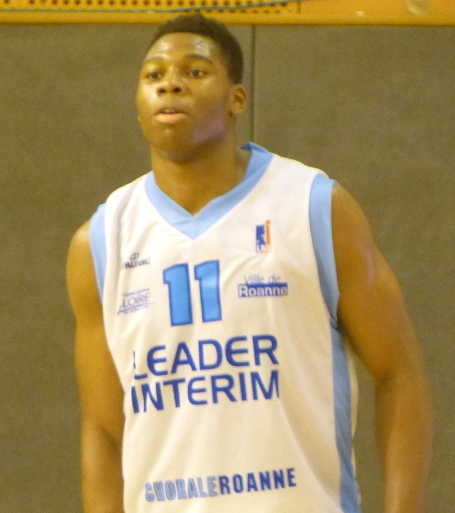
- Yabusele with Roanne in 2013

No. 28 – Panathinaikos
- Position: Power forward / center
- League: Greek Basketball League; EuroLeague

Personal information
- Born: December 17, 1995 (age 30) Dreux, France
- Listed height: 2.04 m (6 ft 8 in)
- Listed weight: 283 lb (128 kg)

Career information
- NBA draft: 2016: 1st round, 16th overall pick
- Drafted by: Boston Celtics
- Playing career: 2013–present

Career history
- 2013–2015: Chorale Roanne
- 2015–2016: Rouen Métropole
- 2016–2017: Shanghai Sharks
- 2017–2019: Boston Celtics
- 2017–2018: →Maine Red Claws
- 2019–2020: Nanjing Monkey Kings
- 2020–2021: ASVEL
- 2021–2024: Real Madrid
- 2024–2025: Philadelphia 76ers
- 2025–2026: New York Knicks
- 2026: Chicago Bulls
- 2026–present: Panathinaikos

Career highlights
- NBA Cup champion (2025); EuroLeague champion (2023); 2× Liga ACB champion (2022, 2024); Spanish Cup winner (2024); 3× Spanish Supercup winner (2021–2023); LNB Pro A champion (2021); French Cup winner (2021); CBA All-Star (2017)
- Stats at NBA.com
- Stats at Basketball Reference
Medals
Men's basketball
Representing France
Summer Olympics
| Silver medal – second place | 2020 Tokyo | Team |
| Silver medal – second place | 2024 Paris | Team |
EuroBasket
| Silver medal – second place | 2022 Czech Republic–Georgia–Italy–Germany |

Guerschon Yabusele (French pronunciation: [ɡɛʁʃɔn jabuzele]; GAIR-shun YAH-boo-ZELL-ay; born December 17, 1995) is a French professional basketball player for Panathinaikos of the Greek Basketball League (GBL) and the EuroLeague. He primarily plays at the power forward position. Yabusele represents the French national team in international competitions, with whom he won silver medals at the 2020 and 2024 Olympics.

Yabusele was considered one of the best international prospects for the 2016 NBA draft. He was drafted with the 16th overall pick by the Boston Celtics and played for them from 2017 to 2019, splitting time with Boston's NBA G League affiliate, the Maine Red Claws. While in Boston, Yabusele became a fan favorite despite playing few minutes and was nicknamed the "Dancing Bear." Yabusele has also played in the Chinese Basketball Association and the lower-level French LNB Pro B. He signed with Real Madrid in 2021, and won a EuroLeague title in 2023. After an impressive performance for France during the 2024 Olympics, he returned to the NBA and signed with the Philadelphia 76ers. Yabusele has also played for the New York Knicks and the Chicago Bulls.

== Early life ==
Yabusele was born and raised in Dreux, France, to parents who emigrated from The Democratic Republic of Congo. In his youth, Yabusele trained as a boxer. He began playing basketball with the youth sections of Chorale Roanne Basket in 2012, competing with their under-21 team.

== Professional career ==
=== Chorale Roanne (2013–2015) ===
Yabusele joined the Chorale Roanne team in the LNB Pro B in 2013 and finished the season averaging 1.5 points per game in 8 appearances. The next season, he averaged six points, four rebounds, and 1.7 assists.

=== Rouen Métropole (2015–2016) ===
Yabusele signed with Rouen Métropole Basket of the LNB Pro A, the top league in France, in the summer of 2015. He made the decision to help his NBA draft stock. Yabusele wound up being one of 13 international underclassmen, and one of four Frenchmen, to officially enter their names for the 2016 NBA draft. He was projected to be either a late first round or early second round selection but surprised many by going 16th overall in the draft to Boston. Yabusele joined the Boston Celtics for the 2016 NBA Summer League.

=== Shanghai Sharks (2016–2017) ===
On July 21, 2016, Yabusele signed a deal with the Shanghai Sharks of the Chinese Basketball Association. In 43 games for the Sharks, he averaged 20.9 points and 9.4 rebounds. Yabusele was named a CBA All-Star for his production with the Sharks.

=== Maine Red Claws (2017) ===
On March 29, 2017, Yabusele signed with the Maine Red Claws of the NBA Development League.

=== Boston Celtics (2017–2019) ===
On July 20, 2017, Yabusele signed with the Boston Celtics of the National Basketball Association. He made his debut on October 20, finishing with the statline of 3 points and 1 rebound in just 3 minutes of action in a 102–92 win against the Philadelphia 76ers. During his rookie season, he received multiple assignments to the Maine Red Claws. Yabusele's career highs all occurred during the 2017–18 season. His high in rebounds (6) came in a 111–104 win against the Chicago Bulls, his career high in assists (5) came in a 125–124 loss to the Washington Wizards, and his career high in points (16) came in a 110–97 win against the Brooklyn Nets. On July 10, 2019, Yabusele was waived by the Celtics.

=== Nanjing Monkey Kings (2019–2020) ===
On August 17, 2019, Yabusele signed with the Nanjing Monkey Kings, returning to the CBA for the 2019–20 season.

=== ASVEL (2020–2021) ===
On February 25, 2020, Yabusele signed with LDLC ASVEL of the French LNB Pro A. Yabusele re-signed with the team on June 1.

=== Real Madrid (2021–2024) ===
On July 12, 2021, Yabusele signed a one-year contract with Spanish powerhouse Real Madrid of the Liga ACB and the EuroLeague. On January 9, 2022, he signed a three-year contract extension with Real Madrid, keeping him until the end of the 2024–25 season. On August 29, 2024, he left Real Madrid.

=== Philadelphia 76ers (2024–2025) ===
On August 29, 2024, Yabusele returned to the NBA, signing with the Philadelphia 76ers. On November 10, Yabusele scored a career-high 20 points with 8 rebounds in a 107–105 victory over the Charlotte Hornets.

=== New York Knicks (2025–2026) ===
On July 7, 2025, Yabusele signed a two-year, $11.7 million contract with the New York Knicks. Yabusele made 41 appearances off of the bench for New York during the 2025–26 NBA season, posting averages of 2.7 points, 2.1 rebounds, and 0.4 assists.

=== Chicago Bulls (2026) ===
On February 5, 2026, Yabusele was traded to the Chicago Bulls from the New York Knicks in exchange for Dalen Terry and two second-round draft picks.

=== Panathinaikos (2026–present) ===
On July 8, 2026, Yabusele signed a three-year contract with Panathinaikos of the Greek Basketball League (GBL) and the EuroLeague.

== National team career ==
=== Junior team ===
Yabusele played for the France under-18 team at the 2013 FIBA Europe Under-18 Championship and later with the under-20 team at the 2014 FIBA Europe Under-20 Championship and the 2015 FIBA Europe Under-20 Championship.

=== Senior team ===
He played with Les Bleus at the 2020 Olympics, where he won a silver medal, as well as at EuroBasket 2022, once again winning silver. He also played at the 2023 World Cup.

He played a key role in France's campaign at 2024 Olympics. Despite having a minor role in the preliminary round, he led the team to a quarter-final victory over Canada with 22 points and 5 rebounds. He then scored 17 points on 7-for-11 shooting, as well as 7 rebounds, to lead France to a semi-final win over Germany, to qualify for their second straight Olympic final. In the final against the United States, Yabusele scored 20 points, including a baseline poster dunk on LeBron James, before eventually losing and finishing with a silver medal. After the tournament, he was named to the tournament's All-Second Team.

Yabusele led France at EuroBasket 2025. On September 2, he scored a career-high 36 points to lead France to a 83–76 win over Poland in the group phase.

== Career statistics ==
Legend
| GP | Games played | GS | Games started | MPG | Minutes per game |
| FG% | Field-goal percentage | 3P% | 3-point field-goal percentage | FT% | Free-throw percentage |
| RPG | Rebounds per game | APG | Assists per game | SPG | Steals per game |
| BPG | Blocks per game | PPG | Points per game | PIR | Performance index rating |
| **Bold** | Career high |

=== NBA ===
==== Regular season ====
| Year | Team | GP | GS | MPG | FG% | 3P% | FT% | RPG | APG | SPG | BPG | PPG |
|---|---|---|---|---|---|---|---|---|---|---|---|---|
| 2017–18 | Boston | 33 | 4 | 7.1 | .426 | .324 | .682 | 1.6 | .5 | .1 | .2 | 2.4 |
| 2018–19 | Boston | 41 | 1 | 6.1 | .455 | .321 | .682 | 1.3 | .4 | .2 | .2 | 2.3 |
| 2024–25 | Philadelphia | **70** | **43** | **27.1** | **.501** | .380 | .725 | 5.6 | **2.1** | **.8** | .3 | **11.0** |
| 2025–26 | New York | 41 | 0 | 8.9 | .393 | .294 | .667 | 2.1 | .4 | .1 | .1 | 2.7 |
| 2025–26 | Chicago | 26 | 19 | 24.7 | .405 | **.383** | **.767** | **5.7** | 1.7 | **.8** | **.4** | 10.0 |
| Career | | 211 | 67 | 16.1 | .462 | .363 | .724 | 3.5 | 1.1 | .5 | .2 | 6.2 |

==== Playoffs ====
| Year | Team | GP | GS | MPG | FG% | 3P% | FT% | RPG | APG | SPG | BPG | PPG |
|---|---|---|---|---|---|---|---|---|---|---|---|---|
| 2018 | Boston | **12** | 0 | **4.0** | .111 | .000 | .400 | **.9** | **.3** | **.2** | .0 | .3 |
| 2019 | Boston | 4 | 0 | 3.5 | **.500** | .000 | **.571** | .5 | **.3** | .0 | **.3** | **2.0** |
| Career | | 16 | 0 | 3.9 | .231 | .000 | .500 | .8 | .3 | .1 | .1 | .8 |

=== EuroLeague ===
| † | Denotes seasons in which Yabusele won the EuroLeague |

| Year | Team | GP | GS | MPG | FG% | 3P% | FT% | RPG | APG | SPG | BPG | PPG | PIR |
|---|---|---|---|---|---|---|---|---|---|---|---|---|---|
| 2019–20 | ASVEL | 2 | 1 | 23.0 | .429 | .400 | — | 3.5 | — | **2.5** | **1.0** | 8.0 | 6.5 |
| 2020–21 | ASVEL | 30 | 26 | 25.1 | .465 | .384 | .714 | 4.2 | 1.2 | .8 | .6 | 11.0 | 11.0 |
| 2021–22 | Real Madrid | **36** | **34** | **27.6** | .502 | .402 | .789 | 4.8 | **1.7** | 1.0 | .3 | **11.9** | 13.5 |
| 2022–23† | Real Madrid | 29 | 16 | 23.8 | .510 | .421 | .710 | 4.0 | 1.3 | .8 | .3 | 9.7 | 11.4 |
| 2023–24 | Real Madrid | 27 | 13 | 23.6 | **.565** | **.461** | **.868** | **4.9** | 1.0 | .8 | .2 | 10.5 | **14.2** |
| Career | | 124 | 90 | 25.2 | .504 | .411 | .770 | 4.4 | 1.3 | .9 | .3 | 10.8 | 12.4 |
