= 2021–22 FC Barcelona Bàsquet season =

Spanish basketball club season

FC Barcelona
2021–22 season
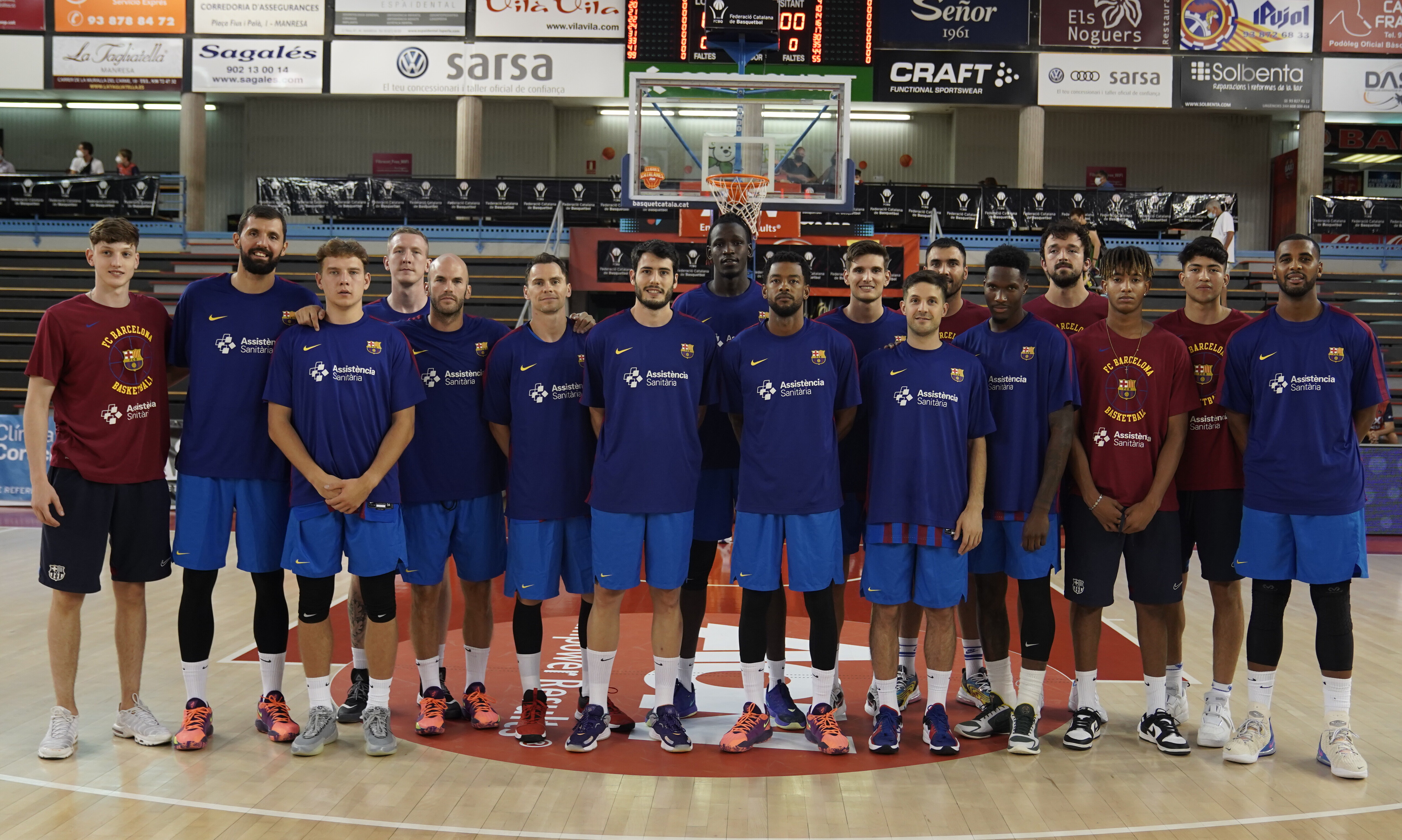
- Barcelona roster in September 2021
- President: Joan Laporta
- Head coach: Šarūnas Jasikevičius
- Arena: Palau Blaugrana
- Liga ACB: Runners-up
- EuroLeague: Third place
- Copa del Rey: Winners
- Supercopa de España: Runners-up
- Highest home attendance: 7,444 vs Bayern Munich (3 May 2022)
- Average home attendance: 5,174 (in EuroLeague); 5,035 (in Liga ACB)
- Biggest win: 107–70 vs BAXI Manresa (18 February 2022)
- Biggest defeat: 80–104 vs Maccabi Tel Aviv (7 April 2022)
Home	Away	Third
- All statistics correct as of 18 June 2025.

The 2021–22 season was FC Barcelona's 95th in existence, their 56th consecutive season in the top flight of Spanish basketball and 23rd consecutive season in the EuroLeague.

In the 2021–22 season, FC Barcelona competed in the Liga ACB, Copa del Rey, Spanish Supercup and EuroLeague.

== Overview ==
=== Pre-season ===
Head coach Šarūnas Jasikevičius continued at the helm for his second season after a successful first season winning the League and Cup and reaching the EuroLeague finals.

The first signing of the summer was center Sertaç Şanlı, coming from Turkish side Anadolu Efes. Şanlı signed a two-season deal on July 1. 20 year old point guard Rokas Jokubaitis was the second signing of the summer. Coming from Lithuanian team Žalgiris Kaunas, Jokubaitis signed on July 21. Argentine guard Nicolás Laprovíttola was announced as a new Barcelona player on July 28, signing a two-season deal after previously playing for rivals Real Madrid and Joventut Badalona. On August 22, Nigel Hayes-Davis was also announced as a new player, signing a one-season deal.

In late August, Barcelona played two friendly games at the Centre Esportiu i Sociocultural in Encamp, Andorra. Barcelona beat hosts MoraBanc Andorra in the first and French side Limoges in the second. Between September 4 and 5, Barcelona took part in the 2021 edition of the Lliga Catalana de Bàsquet, held in Manresa. After beating Joventut Badalona in the semifinals, Barcelona lost in the final against Bàsquet Manresa.

== Players ==
=== Roster ===
Note: Flags indicate national team eligibility at FIBA-sanctioned events. Players may hold other non-FIBA nationalities not displayed.

FC Barcelona roster
Players
Coaches

Pos.	No.	Nat.	Name	Ht.	Wt.	Age
C	0	(United States) (Uganda)	Davies, Brandon	2.08 m (6 ft 10 in)	109 kg (240 lb)	30 – 25 July 1991
G/F	1	(Australia)	Exum, Dante	1.96 m (6 ft 5 in)	97 kg (214 lb)	26 – 13 July 1995
C	5	(Turkey)	Şanlı, Sertaç	2.13 m (7 ft 0 in)	115 kg (254 lb)	30 – 5 August 1991
SF	8	(Spain)	Martínez, Sergi	2.02 m (6 ft 8 in)	102 kg (225 lb)	22 – 10 May 1999
PF	10	(Latvia)	Šmits, Rolands	2.07 m (6 ft 9 in)	105 kg (231 lb)	26 – 25 June 1995
F	14	(United States)	Hayes-Davis, Nigel	2.03 m (6 ft 8 in)	103 kg (227 lb)	27 – 16 December 1994
F/C	18	(Spain)	Oriola, Pierre (C)	2.06 m (6 ft 9 in)	107 kg (236 lb)	29 – 25 September 1992
G	20	(Argentina) (Italy)	Laprovíttola, Nicolás	1.91 m (6 ft 3 in)	82 kg (181 lb)	32 – 31 January 1990
SF	21	(Spain)	Abrines, Álex	1.98 m (6 ft 6 in)	91 kg (201 lb)	28 – 1 August 1993
SG	22	(United States)	Higgins, Cory	1.96 m (6 ft 5 in)	82 kg (181 lb)	32 – 14 June 1989
SG	24	(Slovakia) (United States)	Kuric, Kyle	1.93 m (6 ft 4 in)	88 kg (194 lb)	32 – 25 August 1989
PG	31	(Lithuania)	Jokubaitis, Rokas	1.93 m (6 ft 4 in)	88 kg (194 lb)	21 – 19 November 2000
PF	33	(Spain) (Montenegro)	Mirotić, Nikola	2.08 m (6 ft 10 in)	113 kg (249 lb)	31 – 11 February 1991
SG	42	(Spain)	Caicedo, Michael	1.97 m (6 ft 6 in)	90 kg (198 lb)	18 – 21 June 2003
C	46	(Nigeria)	Nnaji, James	2.12 m (6 ft 11 in)	113 kg (249 lb)	17 – 14 August 2004
PG	99	(Greece) (United States)	Calathes, Nick	1.98 m (6 ft 6 in)	97 kg (214 lb)	33 – 7 February 1989

Head coach

- (Lithuania) Šarūnas Jasikevičius

Assistant coach(es)

- (Lithuania) Darius Maskoliūnas
- (Lithuania) Tomas Masiulis
- (Spain) David García

Team manager

- (Spain) Juan Carlos Navarro

Legend

- (C) Team captain
- Injured

- Roster

=== Depth chart ===
Pos.	Starting 5	Bench 1	Bench 2	Bench 3
C	Brandon Davies	Sertaç Şanlı	Pierre Oriola †	James Nnaji;
PF	Nigel Hayes-Davis *	Rolands Šmits
SF	Nikola Mirotić †	Danté Exum *	Sergi Martínez †
SG	Cory Higgins *	Kyle Kuric	Álex Abrines †	Michael Caicedo;
PG	Nick Calathes	Nicolás Laprovíttola	Rokas Jokubaitis;

Notes: Blue † – homegrown player; (Note: A homegrown player is a player that played for at least three years before the age of 20 on a Spanish team. In Liga ACB, the team must register at least four homegrown players in rosters of 10–12 players or at least three homegrown players in rosters of 8–9 players. In EuroLeague, the team did not have any limitations regarding the number of homegrown players.) Red * – overseas player; (Note: An overseas player is a player from outside EEA, FIBA Europe or ACP states. In Liga ACB, the team may register at most two overseas players. In EuroLeague, the team did not have any limitations regarding the number of overseas players.) Green ‡ – youth player (Note: In Liga ACB, the team may register under-22 players linked to the youth system. In EuroLeague, the team may register under-20 players linked to the youth system.)

=== On loan ===
Players out on loan
Nat.	Player	Position	Team	On loan since
(Argentina)	Juani Marcos	PG	(Spain) Lleida	September 2021–June 2022
(Senegal)	Ibou Badji	C	(Spain) Lleida	October 2021–June 2022
(Uruguay)	Agustín Ubal	G/F	(Spain) Breogán	March 2022–June 2022

=== Roster changes ===
==== In ====
No.	Pos.	Nat.	Name	Moving from		Type	Date	Source
5	C	(Turkey)	Sertaç Şanlı	Anadolu Efes	(Turkey)	End of contract	1 Jul 2021	
31	PG	(Lithuania)	Rokas Jokubaitis	Žalgiris Kaunas	(Lithuania)	End of contract	21 Jul 2021	
20	G	(Argentina)	Nicolás Laprovíttola	Real Madrid	(Spain)	Parted ways	28 Jul 2021	
14	PF	(United States)	Nigel Hayes-Davis	Žalgiris Kaunas	(Lithuania)	End of contract	22 Aug 2021	
1	G	(Australia)	Danté Exum	Cleveland Cavaliers	(United States)	Contract termination	7 Dec 2021	

==== Out ====
No.	Pos.	Nat.	Name	Moving to		Type	Date	Source
14	C	(Ukraine)	Artem Pustovyi	Gran Canaria	(Spain)	End of contract	30 Jun 2021	
30	F	(Spain)	Víctor Claver	Valencia Basket	(Spain)	Parted ways	12 Jul 2021	
8	SF	(Hungary)	Ádám Hanga	Real Madrid	(Spain)	Parted ways	16 Jul 2021	
2	PG	(France)	Léo Westermann	AS Monaco	(France)	Parted ways	29 Jul 2021	
9	G	(Argentina)	Leandro Bolmaro	Minnesota Timberwolves	(United States)	Contract buyout	15 Sep 2021	
16	C	(Spain)	Pau Gasol			Retirement	5 Oct 2021	

== Pre-season and friendlies ==
=== Friendly matches ===
26 August 2021	MoraBanc Andorra (Andorran Basketball Federation)	72–81	(Catalonia) FC Barcelona	Encamp
19:00	Scoring by quarter: 20–22, 17–12, 13–25, 22–22
	Pts: Crawford 20	Report	Pts: Hayes-Davis 15	Arena: Centre Esportiu i Sociocultural d’Encamp

30 August 2021	FC Barcelona (Catalonia)	75–47	(French Federation of Basketball) Limoges	Encamp
18:30	Scoring by quarter: 24–12, 19–9, 19–14, 21–12
	Pts: Mirotić 13	Report	Pts: Paumier 12	Arena: Centre Esportiu i Sociocultural d’Encamp; Attendance: 100

=== Lliga Catalana de Bàsquet ===
4 September 2021 Semifinal	FC Barcelona (Catalonia)	88–77	(Catalonia) Joventut	Manresa
19:30	Scoring by quarter: 14–18, 19–18, 32–14, 17–19
	Pts: Davies 13	Report	Pts: Willis 19	Arena: Pavelló Nou Congost; Referees: Óscar Perea, Arnau Padrós, Andrés Fernández

5 September 2021 Final	BAXI Manresa (Catalonia)	81–70	(Catalonia) FC Barcelona	Manresa
21:30	Scoring by quarter: 16–21, 20–16, 17–19, 28–14
	Pts: Bako 18	Report	Pts: Šmits 15	Arena: Pavelló Nou Congost; Referees: Óscar Perea, Juan de Dios Oyón, Arnau Padrós

== Competitions ==
=== Overview ===
Competition	First match	Last match	Starting round	Final position	Record							
Competition	First match	Last match	Starting round	Final position	Pld	W	D	L	PF	PA	PD	Win %
Liga ACB	19 September 2021	19 June 2022	Round 1	Runners-up	44	33		11	3,616	3,322	+294	75.00
EuroLeague	1 October 2021	21 May 2022	Round 1	Third place	35	25		10	2,802	2,615	+187	71.43
Copa del Rey	18 February 2022	20 February 2022	Quarter-finals	Winners	3	3		0	274	219	+55	100.00
Supercopa de España	11 September 2021	12 September 2021	Semi-finals	Runners-up	2	1		1	170	156	+14	50.00
Total					84	62	0	22	6,862	6,312	+550	73.81

Last updated: 17 June 2025
Source: Competitions

=== Liga ACB ===
==== League table ====
Pos	Team	Pld	W	L	PF	PA	PD	Qualification or relegation
1	Barça	34	27	7	2833	2539	+294	Qualification to playoffs
2	Real Madrid	34	25	9	2840	2580	+260	Qualification to playoffs
3	Valencia Basket	34	23	11	2827	2702	+125	Qualification to playoffs
4	Joventut	34	22	12	2776	2666	+110	Qualification to playoffs
5	Lenovo Tenerife	34	21	13	2819	2685	+134	Qualification to playoffs

Source: ACB
Rules for classification: 1) Win–loss record; 2) Head–to–head record; 3) Head–to–head point difference; 4) Point difference; 5) Points scored; 6) Sum of quotients of points scored (Note: Head–to–head record is used only after all the matches between the teams in question have been played)

==== Results summary ====
Overall						Home					Away				
Pld	W	L	PF	PA	PD	W	L	PF	PA	PD	W	L	PF	PA	PD
34	27	7	2833	2539	+294	13	4	1448	1301	+147	14	3	1385	1238	+147

Source: Competitive matches

==== Results by round ====
Round	1	2	3	4	5	6	7	8	9	10	11	12	13	14	15	16	17	18	19	20	21	22	23	24	25	26	27	28	29	30	31	32	33	34
Ground	H	A	H	A	A	H	A	H	A	H	A	H	A	H	H	A	H	A	H	A	H	A	A	H	H	A	A	H	A	H	H	A	H	A
Result	W	W	W	W	W	W	W	W	W	L	W	L	W	L	W	W	W	L	L	W	W	W	W	W	W	L	W	W	L	W	W	W	W	W
Position	4	4	2	2	2	1	1	1	1	2	2	2	2	2	2	2	2	2	2	2	2	2	2	2	1	1	1	1	1	1	1	1	1	1

Source: Competitive matches
A = Away; H = Home; W = Win; L = Loss; R = Rest

==== Matches ====
19 September 2021 1	FC Barcelona	85–78	UCAM Murcia	Barcelona
12:30	Scoring by quarter: 26–14, 16–14, 16–30, 27–20
	Pts: Higgins, Mirotić 18; Rebs: Hayes-Davis 5 Asts: Calathes, Higgins 4 PIR: Higgins 24	Boxscore	Pts: Taylor 18; Rebs: Lima, Radović 6 Asts: Radović 4 PIR: Lima 21	Arena: Palau Blaugrana; Attendance: 2,514; Referees: Daniel Hierrezuelo, Francisco Araña, Fabio Fernández

22 September 2021 2	Gran Canaria	64–82	FC Barcelona	Las Palmas
21:30	Scoring by quarter: 17–23, 9–18, 18–21, 20–20
	Pts: Ennis 13; Rebs: Diop 5 Asts: Brussino 3 PIR: Salvó 11	Boxscore	Pts: Mirotić 14; Rebs: Mirotić 16; Asts: Mirotić 4 PIR: Mirotić 36	Arena: Gran Canaria Arena; Attendance: 1,751; Referees: Miguel Ángel Pérez Pérez, Vicente Bultó, David Sánchez

25 September 2021 3	FC Barcelona	78–69	Río Breogán	Barcelona
18:00	Scoring by quarter: 23–15, 19–21, 18–19, 18–14
	Pts: Mirotić 22; Rebs: Mirotić 7 Asts: Calathes, Davies 5 PIR: Mirotić 32	Boxscore	Pts: Musa 14; Rebs: Larsen 7 Asts: Bell-Haynes, Mahalbašić 4 PIR: Mahalbašić 13	Arena: Palau Blaugrana; Attendance: 2,517; Referees: Óscar Perea, Sergio Manuel, Héctor Baez

3 October 2021 4	Surne Bilbao Basket	68–84	FC Barcelona	Bilbao
17:00	Scoring by quarter: 16–18, 17–23, 12–23, 23–20
	Pts: Delgado 15; Rebs: Masiulis 5 Asts: Rousselle 4 PIR: Goudelock 18	Boxscore	Pts: Jokubaitis 22; Rebs: Oriola 6 Asts: Calathes, Laprovíttola 3 PIR: Jokubaitis 22	Arena: Bilbao Arena; Attendance: 3,957; Referees: Juan Carlos García González, Arnau Padrós, Iyán González

10 October 2021 5	Coosur Real Betis	61–78	FC Barcelona	Seville
17:00	Scoring by quarter: 15–19, 14–18, 21–20, 11–21
	Pts: Todorović 15; Rebs: Todorović 8 Asts: Evans 3 PIR: Todorović 21	Boxscore	Pts: Šmits 12; Rebs: Šmits 10; Asts: Jokubaitis 4 PIR: Šmits 15	Arena: San Pablo; Attendance: 4,107; Referees: Benjamín Jiménez, Martín Caballero, Rubén Sánchez Mohedas

5 October 2021 6	FC Barcelona	76–63	Casademont Zaragoza	Barcelona
20:30	Scoring by quarter: 25–16, 11–15, 18–13, 22–19
	Pts: Hayes-Davis, Laprovíttola 11; Rebs: Oriola, Şanlı 5 Asts: Calathes 6 PIR: Laprovíttola, Oriola 13	Boxscore	Pts: Okoye 14; Rebs: McLean, Okoye 4 Asts: four players 2 PIR: McLean, Okoye 17	Arena: Palau Blaugrana; Attendance: 2,284; Referees: Emilio Pérez Pizarro, Javier Torres, Cristóbal Sánchez

24 October 2021 7	Unicaja	73–75	FC Barcelona	Málaga
18:30	Scoring by quarter: 11–23, 12–12, 26–23, 24–17
	Pts: Eric 15; Rebs: Eric 7 Asts: Cole 6 PIR: Eric 25	Boxscore	Pts: Kuric 18; Rebs: Mirotić 6 Asts: Calathes 5 PIR: Kuric 21	Arena: Martín Carpena; Attendance: 6,082; Referees: Miguel Ángel Pérez Pérez, Sergio Manuel, Vicente Martínez

31 October 2021 8	FC Barcelona	79–69	Urbas Fuenlabrada	Barcelona
12:30	Scoring by quarter: 21–19, 13–15, 23–16, 22–19
	Pts: Higgins 13; Rebs: three players 5 Asts: Laprovíttola, Mirotić 3 PIR: Kuric 15	Boxscore	Pts: Alexander 13; Rebs: Alexander 10; Asts: Armand 6 PIR: Alexander 24	Arena: Palau Blaugrana; Attendance: 3,759; Referees: Óscar Perea, Jorge Martínez, David Sánchez

7 November 2021 9	Monbus Obradoiro	64–79	FC Barcelona	Santiago de Compostela
12:30	Scoring by quarter: 13–23, 23–16, 13–26, 15–14
	Pts: Birutis 24; Rebs: Scrubb 9 Asts: Robertson 4 PIR: Birutis 28	Boxscore	Pts: Mirotić 18; Rebs: Davies 7 Asts: Laprovíttola 5 PIR: Mirotić 22	Arena: Fontes do Sar; Attendance: 4,572; Referees: Daniel Hierrezuelo, Juan de Dios Oyón, Andrés Fernández

14 November 2021 10	FC Barcelona	79–87	Valencia Basket	Barcelona
18:30	Scoring by quarter: 21–19, 17–16, 25–28, 16–24
	Pts: Mirotić 22; Rebs: Davies 5 Asts: Calathes 7 PIR: Mirotić 22	Boxscore	Pts: Rivero 18; Rebs: Rivero 7 Asts: Prepelič 5 PIR: Rivero 25	Arena: Palau Blaugrana; Attendance: 4,319; Referees: Antonio Conde, Luis Miguel Castillo, Carlos Merino

21 November 2021 11	Hereda San Pablo Burgos	69–83	FC Barcelona	Burgos
20:00	Scoring by quarter: 16–21, 17–18, 22–20, 14–24
	Pts: three players 12; Rebs: Rabaseda 6 Asts: Benite, McGee 2 PIR: Díez 12	Boxscore	Pts: Şanlı 19; Rebs: Şanlı 11; Asts: Laprovíttola 8 PIR: Şanlı 29	Arena: Coliseum Burgos; Attendance: 7,208; Referees: Carlos Cortés, Vicente Bultó, Iyán González

5 December 2021 12	FC Barcelona	78–91	Bitci Baskonia	Barcelona
18:30	Scoring by quarter: 12–22, 23–24', 19–22, 24–23
	Pts: Mirotić 20; Rebs: Mirotić 8 Asts: Laprovíttola 4 PIR: Mirotić 26	Boxscore	Pts: Enoch 23; Rebs: Costello 7 Asts: Granger 6 PIR: Enoch 27	Arena: Palau Blaugrana; Attendance: 5,468; Referees: Juan Carlos García González, Jordi Aliaga, Alfonso Olivares

12 December 2021 13	Lenovo Tenerife	60–75	FC Barcelona	San Cristóbal de La Laguna
18:30	Scoring by quarter: 15–14, 12–19, 18–20, 15–22
	Pts: Shermadini 17; Rebs: Sulejmanović 4 Asts: Fitipaldo 3 PIR: Shermadini 23	Boxscore	Pts: Mirotić 18; Rebs: Şanlı 8 Asts: Laprovíttola 4 PIR: Mirotić 22	Arena: Santiago Martín; Attendance: 4,073; Referees: Carlos Peruga, Juan de Dios Oyón, Cristóbal Sánchez

9 January 2022 14	FC Barcelona	95–96(OT)	BAXI Manresa	Barcelona
17:00	Scoring by quarter: 17–25, 27–12, 15–23, 27–26, Overtime: 9–10
	Pts: Mirotić 20; Rebs: Mirotić 8 Asts: Jokubaitis 4 PIR: Nnaji 19	Boxscore	Pts: Francisco 25; Rebs: Moneke 13; Asts: García 4 PIR: Moneke 30	Arena: Palau Blaugrana; Attendance: 3,892; Referees: Miguel Ángel Pérez Pérez, Javier Torres, Vicente Martínez
Note: The game, originally scheduled for 19 December 2021, was postponed due to a COVID-19 outbreak in Manresa's squad.

1 March 2022 15	FC Barcelona	107–88	MoraBanc Andorra	Barcelona
21:00	Scoring by quarter: 28–33, 24–16, 28–17, 27–22
	Pts: Kuric, Laprovíttola 17; Rebs: Martínez 6 Asts: Calathes, Jokubaitis 7 PIR: Davies 18	Boxscore	Pts: Miller-McIntyre 26; Rebs: Arteaga, Diagne 6 Asts: Hannah, Miller-McIntyre 2 PIR: Miller-McIntyre 24	Arena: Palau Blaugrana; Attendance: 4,199; Referees: Carlos Cortés, Rafael Serrano, Carlos Merino
Note: The game, originally scheduled for 28 December 2021, was postponed due to a COVID-19 outbreak in Andorra's squad.

23 January 2022 16	Real Madrid	75–85	FC Barcelona	Madrid
18:30	Scoring by quarter: 24–18, 16–24, 14–21, 21–22
	Pts: Tavares 12; Rebs: Yabusele 5 Asts: Williams-Goss, Abalde 3 PIR: Tavares 18	Boxscore	Pts: Kuric, Şanlı 17; Rebs: Laprovíttola, Şanlı 5 Asts: Laprovíttola 6 PIR: Laprovíttola, Kuric 19	Arena: WiZink Center; Attendance: 7,049; Referees: Benjamín Jiménez, Óscar Perea, Alfonso Olivares
Note: The game, originally scheduled for 2 January 2022, was postponed due to a COVID-19 outbreak in Barça's squad.

30 January 2022 17	FC Barcelona	99–84	Joventut	Barcelona
18:30	Scoring by quarter: 24–13, 16–22, 26–21, 33–28
	Pts: Laprovíttola 21; Rebs: Mirotić 5 Asts: Calathes, Laprovíttola 4 PIR: Davies, Laprovíttola 24	Boxscore	Pts: Tomić 20; Rebs: Tomić 8 Asts: Vives 5 PIR: Tomić 23	Arena: Palau Blaugrana; Attendance: 5,902; Referees: Juan Carlos García González, Alberto Sánchez Sixto, Joaquín García
Note: The game, originally scheduled for earlier in January 2022, was postponed due to the massive rescheduling of the 2021–22 ACB season caused by the COVID-19 pandemic.

5 March 2022 18	Valencia Basket	86–76	FC Barcelona	Valencia
18:00	Scoring by quarter: 21–21, 19–21, 24–19, 22–15
	Pts: Tobey 17; Rebs: Claver 8 Asts: Dimitrijević 7 PIR: Dimitrijević 20	Boxscore	Pts: Mirotić 14; Rebs: Mirotić 5 Asts: Calathes 9 PIR: Mirotić 15	Arena: La Fonteta; Attendance: 7,068; Referees: Antonio Conde, Jorge Martínez, Roberto Lucas

14 April 2022 19	FC Barcelona	63–73	Unicaja	Barcelona
18:00	Scoring by quarter: 18–19, 14–16, 14–15, 17–23
	Pts: Mirotić 20; Rebs: Mirotić 6 Asts: Calathes 5 PIR: Mirotić 22	Boxscore	Pts: Brizuela 22; Rebs: Guerrero, Kravić 7 Asts: Brizuela, Kravić 3 PIR: Brizuela 25	Arena: Palau Blaugrana; Attendance: 5,518; Referees: Daniel Hierrezuelo, Jorge Martínez, Andrés Fernández
Note: The game, originally scheduled for 23 January 2022, was postponed due to the massive rescheduling of the 2021–22 ACB season caused by the COVID-19 pandemic.

16 March 2022 20	Bitci Baskonia	77–96	FC Barcelona	Vitoria-Gasteiz
21:00	Scoring by quarter: 16–22, 15–20, 21–25, 25–29
	Pts: Fontecchio 24; Rebs: Enoch 9 Asts: Baldwin 4 PIR: Enoch 21	Boxscore	Pts: Laprovíttola 24; Rebs: Calathes 7 Asts: Calathes 13; PIR: Laprovíttola 21	Arena: Buesa Arena; Attendance: 7,119; Referees: Daniel Hierrezuelo, Rubén Sánchez Mohedas, Joaquín García
Note: The game, originally scheduled for 30 January 2022, was postponed due to the massive rescheduling of the 2021–22 ACB season caused by the COVID-19 pandemic.

6 February 2022 21	FC Barcelona	83–67	Monbus Obradoiro	Barcelona
12:30	Scoring by quarter: 19–19, 18–15, 20–16, 26–17
	Pts: Mirotić 21; Rebs: Mirotić 10; Asts: Calathes 7 PIR: Mirotić 28	Boxscore	Pts: Birutis 17; Rebs: Okouo 5 Asts: Zurbriggen 4 PIR: Birutis 19	Arena: Palau Blaugrana; Attendance: 5,036; Referees: Miguel Ángel Pérez Pérez, Rafael Serrano, Andrés Fernández

29 March 2022 22	UCAM Murcia	87–89	FC Barcelona	Murcia
20:30	Scoring by quarter: 27–16, 19–26, 14–22, 27–25
	Pts: Taylor 25; Rebs: Lima 6 Asts: Davis 4 PIR: Taylor 26	Boxscore	Pts: Mirotić 30; Rebs: Mirotić 9 Asts: Calathes 5 PIR: Mirotić 39	Arena: Palacio de Deportes; Attendance: 5,795; Referees: Miguel Ángel Pérez Pérez, Sergio Manuel, Alberto Baena

8 March 2022 23	Urbas Fuenlabrada	69–86	FC Barcelona	Fuenlabrada
20:30	Scoring by quarter: 22–20, 9–17, 22–24, 16–25
	Pts: Ristić 17; Rebs: Ristić 6 Asts: Samar 6 PIR: Alexander, Emegano 16	Boxscore	Pts: Davies 18; Rebs: Calathes 10; Asts: Calathes, Jokubaitis 4 PIR: Davies 25	Arena: Fernando Martín; Attendance: 4,068; Referees: Emilio Pérez Pizarro, Javier Torres, Héctor Baez

13 March 2022 24	FC Barcelona	83–63	Coosur Real Betis	Barcelona
17:00	Scoring by quarter: 21–17, 16–14, 23–8, 22–24
	Pts: Davies 16; Rebs: Calathes 9 Asts: Jokubaitis 5 PIR: Davies 21	Boxscore	Pts: Evans 16; Rebs: Wiley 8 Asts: Evans 5 PIR: Evans 15	Arena: Palau Blaugrana; Attendance: 5,597; Referees: Jordi Aliaga, Luis Miguel Castillo, Yasmina Alcaraz

20 March 2022 25	FC Barcelona	98–80	Gran Canaria	Barcelona
18:30	Scoring by quarter: 28–16, 33–12, 19–27, 18–25
	Pts: Abrines 20; Rebs: six players 3 Asts: Calathes, Jokubaitis 7 PIR: Abrines 24	Boxscore	Pts: Balcerowski 16; Rebs: Ennis 9 Asts: Albicy 4 PIR: Balcerowski 15	Arena: Palau Blaugrana; Attendance: 4,850; Referees: Carlos Peruga, Arnau Padrós, Alfonso Olivares

27 March 2022 26	Joventut	83–72	FC Barcelona	Badalona
18:30	Scoring by quarter: 20–17, 30–17, 13–19, 20–19
	Pts: Feliz, Tomić 21; Rebs: Birgander 11; Asts: Ribas 8 PIR: Tomić 21	Boxscore	Pts: Davies 19; Rebs: Davies 8 Asts: three players 3 PIR: Davies 25	Arena: Palau Municipal d'Esports; Attendance: 12,166; Referees: Juan Carlos García González, Vicente Bultó, Cristóbal Sánchez

3 April 2022 27	MoraBanc Andorra	74–86	FC Barcelona	Andorra la Vella
17:00	Scoring by quarter: 19–15, 13–20, 19–24', 13–27
	Pts: Jelínek 16; Rebs: Olumuyiwa 6 Asts: Miller-McIntyre 3 PIR: Jelínek 20	Boxscore	Pts: Exum, Kuric 14; Rebs: Calathes 7 Asts: Calathes 6 PIR: Exum 20	Arena: Poliesportiu d'Andorra; Attendance: 4,200; Referees: Carlos Cortés, Raúl Zamorano, Esperanza Mendoza

10 April 2022 28	FC Barcelona	108–97(OT)	Real Madrid	Barcelona
18:30	Scoring by quarter: 27–23, 24–23, 20–19, 18–24, Overtime: 19–8
	Pts: Laprovíttola 20; Rebs: Exum, Calathes 7 Asts: Calathes 5 PIR: Exum 24	Boxscore	Pts: Deck 17; Rebs: Poirier 6 Asts: Abalde 4 PIR: Deck 21	Arena: Palau Blaugrana; Attendance: 7,438; Referees: Antonio Conde, Martín Caballero, Juan de Dios Oyón

16 April 2022 29	Casademont Zaragoza	76–71	FC Barcelona	Zaragoza
20:45	Scoring by quarter: 11–16, 19–19, 21–23, 25–13
	Pts: Mekowulu 17; Rebs: Mekowulu 7 Asts: Cook, Ferrari 5 PIR: Ferrari, Mekowulu 21	Boxscore	Pts: Abrines 26; Rebs: Exum, Mirotić 5 Asts: Calathes 8 PIR: Abrines 25	Arena: Pabellón Príncipe Felipe; Attendance: 5,732; Referees: Jordi Aliaga, Javier Torres, Joaquín García

24 April 2022 30	FC Barcelona	69–65	Lenovo Tenerife	Barcelona
18:30	Scoring by quarter: 12–11, 14–16, 21–18, 22–20
	Pts: Davies 13; Rebs: Mirotić 6 Asts: three players 3 PIR: Davies, Exum 16	Boxscore	Pts: Shermadini 27; Rebs: Fitipaldo 8 Asts: Huertas 5 PIR: Shermadini 37	Arena: Palau Blaugrana; Attendance: 5,835; Referees: Carlos Cortés, Sergio Manuel, Cristóbal Sánchez

1 May 2022 31	FC Barcelona	84–69	Hereda San Pablo Burgos	Barcelona
12:30	Scoring by quarter: 15–13, 14–17, 30–15, 25–24
	Pts: Abrines 15; Rebs: Kuric 6 Asts: Jokubaitis 8 PIR: Abrines, Jokubaitis 16	Boxscore	Pts: García 18; Rebs: Lalanne 9 Asts: Clemmons, Phillip 3 PIR: García 21	Arena: Palau Blaugrana; Attendance: 5,829; Referees: Fernando Calatrava, Vicente Bultó, Héctor Baez

7 May 2022 32	Río Breogán	72–74	FC Barcelona	Lugo
20:45	Scoring by quarter: 26–15, 22–15, 18–22, 6–22
	Pts: Mahalbašić, Quintela 11; Rebs: Cruz 8 Asts: Quintela 5 PIR: Quintela 12	Boxscore	Pts: Abrines 12; Rebs: Davies 8 Asts: Jokubaitis 3 PIR: Davies 20	Arena: Pazo dos Deportes; Attendance: 5,185; Referees: Jordi Aliaga, Joaquín García, Iyán González

10 May 2022 33	FC Barcelona	84–62	Surne Bilbao Basket	Barcelona
19:00	Scoring by quarter: 16–16, 27–19, 30–15, 11–12
	Pts: Mirotić 18; Rebs: Şanlı 7 Asts: Calathes, Laprovíttola 6 PIR: Mirotić 26	Boxscore	Pts: Delgado 18; Rebs: Withey 9 Asts: Rousselle 4 PIR: Goudelock 15	Arena: Palau Blaugrana; Attendance: 4,517; Referees: Carlos Peruga, Francisco Araña, Fabio Fernández

14 May 2022 34	BAXI Manresa	80–94	FC Barcelona	Manresa
20:45	Scoring by quarter: 21–15, 19–18, 16–30, 24–31
	Pts: Moneke 14; Rebs: Bako 12; Asts: Pérez 4 PIR: Moneke 19	Boxscore	Pts: Laprovíttola 20; Rebs: Calathes 9 Asts: Calathes 8 PIR: Jokubaitis 25	Arena: Nou Congost; Attendance: 5,000; Referees: Óscar Perea, Arnau Padrós, Esperanza Mendoza

=== ACB Playoffs ===
==== Quarterfinals ====
27 May 2022 1	Barça	93–82	Gran Canaria	Barcelona
21:00	Scoring by quarter: 24–17, 24–22, 19–25, 26–18
	Pts: Davies 16; Rebs: Calathes 9 Asts: Calathes 12; PIR: Calathes 28	Boxscore	Pts: Slaughter 15; Rebs: Shurna 8 Asts: Albicy 6 PIR: Shurna 12	Arena: Palau Blaugrana; Attendance: 5,789; Referees: Fernando Calatrava, Luis Miguel Castillo, David Sánchez

29 May 2022 2	Gran Canaria	86–88	Barça	Las Palmas
21:00	Scoring by quarter: 18–15, 28–26, 20–22, 20–25
	Pts: Ennis 26; Rebs: Shurna 5 Asts: Ennis 4 PIR: Ennis 28	Boxscore	Pts: Mirotić 21; Rebs: Mirotić 9 Asts: Higgins 5 PIR: Mirotić 29	Arena: Gran Canaria Arena; Attendance: 7,029; Referees: Juan Carlos García González, Jorge Martínez, Esperanza Mendoza

==== Semifinals ====
3 June 2022 1	Barça	89–72	Joventut	Barcelona
21:00	Scoring by quarter: 12–11, 28–20, 29–17, 20–24
	Pts: Şanlı 16; Rebs: Šmits, Şanlı 8 Asts: Laprovíttola 7 PIR: Şanlı 24	Boxscore	Pts: Ribas, Willis 11; Rebs: Tomić 7 Asts: Tomić, Feliz 3 PIR: Tomić 19	Arena: Palau Blaugrana; Attendance: 5,786; Referees: Antonio Conde, Luis Miguel Castillo, Alfonso Olivares

5 June 2022 2	Barça	81–87	Joventut	Barcelona
12:30	Scoring by quarter: 26–27, 14–15, 13–23, 28–22
	Pts: Calathes 15; Rebs: Şanlı 10; Asts: Calathes 6 PIR: Exum 19	Boxscore	Pts: Tomić 24; Rebs: Tomić, Birgander 5 Asts: Feliz 6 PIR: Tomić 22	Arena: Palau Blaugrana; Attendance: 5,768; Referees: Carlos Peruga, Óscar Perea, Joaquín García

8 June 2022 3	Joventut	77–83	Barça	Badalona
21:00	Scoring by quarter: 14–23, 22–23, 20–15, 21–22
	Pts: Tomić 21; Rebs: Tomić 7 Asts: Ribas 5 PIR: Tomić 27	Boxscore	Pts: Mirotić 18; Rebs: Mirotić 7 Asts: Calathes 6 PIR: Mirotić 27	Arena: Palau Municipal d'Esports; Attendance: 10,323; Referees: Miguel Ángel Pérez Pérez, Martín Caballero, Rafael Serrano

10 June 2022 4	Joventut	60–63	Barça	Badalona
21:00	Scoring by quarter: 14–13, 14–6, 11–21, 21–23
	Pts: Tomić 15; Rebs: Tomić 13; Asts: Ribas 5 PIR: Tomić 23	Boxscore	Pts: Mirotić 20; Rebs: Mirotić 7 Asts: Calathes 5 PIR: Mirotić 18	Arena: Palau Municipal d'Esports; Attendance: 10,787; Referees: Juan Carlos García González, Antonio Conde, Joaquín García

==== Finals ====
13 June 2022 1	Barça	75–88	Real Madrid	Barcelona
21:00	Scoring by quarter: 17–30, 14–19, 20–25, 24–14
	Pts: Laprovíttola 15; Rebs: Davies, Mirotić 6 Asts: Calathes 4 PIR: Mirotić 16	Boxscore	Pts: Deck 18; Rebs: Yabusele 9 Asts: Hanga 6 PIR: Deck 20	Arena: Palau Blaugrana; Attendance: 6,759; Referees: Daniel Hierrezuelo, Jordi Aliaga, Martín Caballero

15 June 2022 2	Barça	71–69	Real Madrid	Barcelona
21:00	Scoring by quarter: 13–17, 19–15, 24–22, 15–15
	Pts: Mirotić 26; Rebs: Mirotić 7 Asts: Jokubaitis 3 PIR: Mirotić 26	Boxscore	Pts: Yabusele 16; Rebs: Yabusele 11; Asts: Deck, Hanga 2 PIR: Yabusele 21	Arena: Palau Blaugrana; Attendance: 7,201; Referees: Emilio Pérez Pizarro, Fernando Calatrava, Luis Miguel Castillo

17 June 2022 3	Real Madrid	81–66	Barça	Madrid
21:00	Scoring by quarter: 21–16, 25–23, 20–14, 15–13
	Pts: Deck 14; Rebs: Poirier 10; Asts: Hanga 3 PIR: Yabusele, Poirier 18	Boxscore	Pts: Kuric 15; Rebs: Laprovíttola 4 Asts: Calathes 6 PIR: Kuric 15	Arena: WiZink Center; Attendance: 11,793; Referees: Carlos Peruga, Benjamín Jiménez, Alberto Sánchez Sixto

19 June 2022 4	Real Madrid	81–74	Barça	Madrid
18:00	Scoring by quarter: 13–10, 21–23, 23–23, 24–18
	Pts: Tavares 25; Rebs: Tavares 13; Asts: Deck 3 PIR: Tavares 41	Boxscore	Pts: Mirotić 14; Rebs: Calathes 9 Asts: five players 2 PIR: Mirotić, Exum 17	Arena: WiZink Center; Attendance: 12,315; Referees: Daniel Hierrezuelo, Óscar Perea, Martín Caballero

=== EuroLeague ===
==== League table ====
Pos	Team	Pld	W	L	PF	PA	PD	Qualification
1	(Spanish Basketball Federation) Barcelona	28	21	7	2275	2101	+174	Qualification to playoffs
2	(Hellenic Basketball Federation) Olympiacos	28	19	9	2222	2045	+177	Qualification to playoffs
3	(Italian Basketball Federation) A|X Armani Exchange Milan	28	19	9	2069	1992	+77	Qualification to playoffs
4	(Spanish Basketball Federation) Real Madrid	28	18	10	2181	2079	+102	Qualification to playoffs
5	(Israeli Basketball Association) Maccabi Tel Aviv	28	17	11	2272	2209	+63	Qualification to playoffs

Source: EuroLeague
Rules for classification: All points scored in extra period(s) were not counted in the standings, nor for any tie-break situation.

==== Results summary ====
Overall						Home					Away				
Pld	W	L	PF	PA	PD	W	L	PF	PA	PD	W	L	PF	PA	PD
28	21	7	2275	2101	+174	12	2	1179	1024	+155	9	5	1096	1077	+19

Last updated: 10 April 2025.
Source: Competitive matches

==== Results by round ====
Round	1	2	3	4	5	6	7	8	9	10	11	12	13	14	15	16	17	18	19	20	21	22	23	24	25	26	27	28	29	30	31	32	33	34
Ground	H	A	H	A	H	A	A	A	H	H	A	H	A	H	A	A	H	A	A	H	H	A	H	H	H	A	A	H	A	H	A	H	A	H
Result	W	W	W	W	W	W	L	L	W	W	W	W	W	W	W	W	W	L	P	L	W	L	W	W	W	W	P	W	L	W	W	W	L	L
Position	1	1	1	1	1	1	2	3	2	1	1	1	1	1	1	1	1	1	1	2	2	2	2	2	1	1	1	1	1	1	1	1	1	1

Source: Competitive matches
A = Away; H = Home; W = Win; L = Loss; P = Postponed

==== Matches ====
1 October 2021 1	Barcelona (Spanish Basketball Federation)	96–64	(German Basketball Federation) ALBA Berlin	Barcelona
21:00	Scoring by quarter: 28–15, 22–14, 13–17, 33–18
	Pts: Mirotić 22; Rebs: three players 5 Asts: Laprovíttola 7 PIR: Mirotić 31	Boxscore	Pts: Sikma 16; Rebs: Sikma 11; Asts: Sikma 4 PIR: Sikma 23	Arena: Palau Blaugrana; Attendance: 3,049; Referees: Ilija Belošević, Milan Nedović, Hugues Thépénier

7 October 2021 2	Bayern Munich (German Basketball Federation)	72–80	(Spanish Basketball Federation) Barcelona	Munich
20:30	Scoring by quarter: 15–16, 18–28, 14–19, 25–17
	Pts: Hilliard 18; Rebs: Thomas 4 Asts: Šiško 4 PIR: Hilliard 16	Boxscore	Pts: Higgins 16; Rebs: Mirotić 4 Asts: Higgins 5 PIR: Higgins 25	Arena: Audi Dome; Attendance: 3,152; Referees: Oļegs Latiševs, Milivoje Jovčić, Saulius Račys

13 October 2021 3	Barcelona (Spanish Basketball Federation)	79–78(OT)	(Hellenic Basketball Federation) Olympiacos	Barcelona
21:00	Scoring by quarter: 10–17, 17–15, 28–15, 12–20, Overtime: 12–11
	Pts: Mirotić 22; Rebs: Calathes 13; Asts: Calathes 7 PIR: Mirotić 24	Boxscore	Pts: Sloukas 14; Rebs: Fall 8 Asts: four players 2 PIR: Vezenkov 14	Arena: Palau Blaugrana; Attendance: 3,086; Referees: Mehdi Difallah, Carmelo Paternicò, Gytis Vilius

15 October 2021 4	AS Monaco (French Federation of Basketball)	81–85(OT)	(Spanish Basketball Federation) Barcelona	Fontvieille
19:00	Scoring by quarter: 22–12, 13–19, 19–25, 21–19, Overtime: 6–10
	Pts: James 16; Rebs: Thomas 9 Asts: Lee 5 PIR: Thomas 28	Boxscore	Pts: Davies 27; Rebs: Calathes 11; Asts: Calathes 5 PIR: Davies 38	Arena: Salle Gaston Médecin; Attendance: 3,914; Referees: Damir Javor, Elias Koromilas, Josip Radojković

22 October 2021 5	Barcelona (Spanish Basketball Federation)	84–58	(Russian Basketball Federation) Zenit Saint Petersburg	Barcelona
21:00	Scoring by quarter: 20–19, 24–8, 22–14, 18–17
	Pts: Mirotić 20; Rebs: Jokubaitis 5 Asts: Calathes 4 PIR: Mirotić 28	Boxscore	Pts: four players 8 Rebs: Ponitka 6 Asts: Kulagin, Loyd 2 PIR: Ponitka 11	Arena: Palau Blaugrana; Attendance: 4,481; Referees: Luigi Lamonica, Emin Moğulkoç, Mario Majkić

26 October 2021 6	Fenerbahçe Beko (Turkish Basketball Federation)	74–76	(Spanish Basketball Federation) Barcelona	Istanbul
19:45	Scoring by quarter: 20–15, 9–20, 19–14, 26–27
	Pts: Veselý 24; Rebs: Veselý 8 Asts: Henry 6 PIR: Veselý 29	Boxscore	Pts: Higgins 18; Rebs: Šmits 8 Asts: Calathes 7 PIR: Davies 20	Arena: Ülker Sports and Event Hall; Attendance: 5,132; Referees: Robert Lottermoser, Tomislav Hordov, Sašo Petek

28 October 2021 7	Maccabi Tel Aviv (Israeli Basketball Association)	85–68	(Spanish Basketball Federation) Barcelona	Tel Aviv
20:05	Scoring by quarter: 31–18, 25–18, 9–18, 20–14
	Pts: Nunnally 17; Rebs: Caloiaro 5 Asts: Wilbekin 5 PIR: Nunnally 21	Boxscore	Pts: Higgins 20; Rebs: Davies 7 Asts: Calathes 6 PIR: Higgins 26	Arena: Menora Mivtachim Arena; Attendance: 10,005; Referees: Matej Boltauzer, Sreten Radović, Fernando Rocha

4 November 2021 8	A|X Armani Exchange Milan (Italian Basketball Federation)	75–70	(Spanish Basketball Federation) Barcelona	Assago
20:30	Scoring by quarter: 28–21, 14–13, 19–15, 14–21
	Pts: Datome 17; Rebs: Melli 8 Asts: Shields 6 PIR: Datome 16	Boxscore	Pts: Davies 12; Rebs: Calathes 7 Asts: Calathes 5 PIR: Calathes, Davies 14	Arena: Mediolanum Forum; Attendance: 7,324; Referees: Ilija Belošević, Milan Nedović, Tomasz Trawicki

11 November 2021 9	Barcelona (Spanish Basketball Federation)	93–67	(Spanish Basketball Federation) Bitci Baskonia	Barcelona
21:00	Scoring by quarter: 32–15, 23–16, 26–10, 12–26
	Pts: Mirotić 25; Rebs: Mirotić 8 Asts: Calathes 7 PIR: Mirotić 37	Boxscore	Pts: Enoch 22; Rebs: Enoch 8 Asts: L. Peters 5 PIR: Enoch 35	Arena: Palau Blaugrana; Attendance: 4,398; Referees: Damir Javor, Mehdi Difallah, Uroš Nikolić

17 November 2021 10	Barcelona (Spanish Basketball Federation)	81–73	(Russian Basketball Federation) CSKA Moscow	Barcelona
21:00	Scoring by quarter: 13–13, 25–14, 13–33, 30–13
	Pts: Mirotić 21; Rebs: Mirotić 8 Asts: Calathes 7 PIR: Mirotić 27	Boxscore	Pts: Voigtmann 21; Rebs: Voigtmann, Shengelia 6 Asts: Shved 4 PIR: Shengelia 24	Arena: Palau Blaugrana; Attendance: 5,028; Referees: Robert Lottermoser, Oļegs Latiševs, Sašo Petek

19 November 2021 11	LDLC ASVEL (French Federation of Basketball)	60–80	(Spanish Basketball Federation) Barcelona	Villeurbanne
21:00	Scoring by quarter: 9–19, 19–12, 19–31, 13–18
	Pts: Okobo 17; Rebs: Howard, Jones 6 Asts: Jones 4 PIR: Jones 15	Boxscore	Pts: Laprovíttola 25; Rebs: Laprovíttola 7 Asts: Jokubaitis 5 PIR: Laprovíttola 28	Arena: Astroballe; Attendance: 5,461; Referees: Borys Ryzhyk, Milivoje Jovčić, Miloš Koljenšić

26 November 2021 12	Barcelona (Spanish Basketball Federation)	96–73	(Lithuanian Basketball Federation) Žalgiris	Barcelona
21:00	Scoring by quarter: 24–17, 28–21, 23–20, 21–15
	Pts: Jokubaitis 15; Rebs: Oriola 9 Asts: Laprovíttola 8 PIR: Oriola 25	Boxscore	Pts: Webster 13; Rebs: Ulanovas 6 Asts: Webster, Kalnietis 4 PIR: Webster 14	Arena: Palau Blaugrana; Attendance: 4,808; Referees: Matej Boltauzer, Fernando Rocha, Luka Kardum

3 December 2021 13	Anadolu Efes (Turkish Basketball Federation)	93–95(OT)	(Spanish Basketball Federation) Barcelona	Istanbul
18:30	Scoring by quarter: 25–20, 22–17, 21–25, 12–18, Overtime: 13–15
	Pts: Micić 26; Rebs: Moerman 6 Asts: Larkin 6 PIR: Micić 31	Boxscore	Pts: Şanlı 24; Rebs: Mirotić 8 Asts: Laprovíttola 8 PIR: Şanlı 25	Arena: Sinan Erdem Dome; Attendance: 15,008; Referees: Luigi Lamonica, Ilija Belošević, Mehdi Difallah

10 December 2021 14	Barcelona (Spanish Basketball Federation)	93–80	(Spanish Basketball Federation) Real Madrid	Barcelona
21:00	Scoring by quarter: 24–19, 27–23, 16–16, 26–22
	Pts: Mirotić 31; Rebs: Mirotić 10; Asts: Laprovíttola, Jokubaitis 4 PIR: Mirotić 39	Boxscore	Pts: Heurtel, Causeur 11; Rebs: Tavares 6 Asts: Heurtel 4 PIR: Tavares 13	Arena: Palau Blaugrana; Attendance: 7,079; Referees: Sreten Radović, Sašo Petek, Uroš Nikolić

14 December 2021 15	Crvena zvezda mts (Basketball Federation of Serbia)	69–76	(Spanish Basketball Federation) Barcelona	Belgrade
19:00	Scoring by quarter: 13–20, 18–14, 18–27, 20–15
	Pts: Kalinić, Mitrović 15; Rebs: Kuzmić 14; Asts: Davidovac 2 PIR: Davidovac 15	Boxscore	Pts: Hayes 14; Rebs: Hayes 8 Asts: Jokubaitis, Laprovíttola 5 PIR: Hayes 23	Arena: Aleksandar Nikolić Hall; Attendance: 6,849; Referees: Carmelo Paternicò, Gytis Vilius, Elias Koromilas

16 December 2021 16	Panathinaikos OPAP (Hellenic Basketball Federation)	82–85	(Spanish Basketball Federation) Barcelona	Athens
20:00	Scoring by quarter: 26–26, 23–15, 15–27, 18–17
	Pts: Nedović 18; Rebs: Papagiannis 8 Asts: Nedović 4 PIR: Papagiannis 17	Boxscore	Pts: Mirotić 20; Rebs: Šmits 9 Asts: Jokubaitis 6 PIR: Mirotić 32	Arena: OAKA Altion; Attendance: 6,122; Referees: Borys Ryzhyk, Fernando Rocha, Tomislav Hordov

22 December 2021 17	Barcelona (Spanish Basketball Federation)	111–109(OT)	(Russian Basketball Federation) UNICS	Barcelona
21:00	Scoring by quarter: 27–28, 10–18, 20–28, 37–20, Overtime: 17–15
	Pts: Mirotić 28; Rebs: three players 6 Asts: Laprovíttola 8 PIR: Mirotić 26	Boxscore	Pts: L. Brown 27; Rebs: L. Brown 7 Asts: L. Brown 9 PIR: L. Brown 33	Arena: Palau Blaugrana; Attendance: 4,863; Referees: Damir Javor, Mehdi Difallah, Rain Peerandi

30 December 2021 18	Bitci Baskonia (Spanish Basketball Federation)	94–75	(Spanish Basketball Federation) Barcelona	Vitoria-Gasteiz
20:30	Scoring by quarter: 20–23, 20–11, 34–20, 20–21
	Pts: Giedraitis 20; Rebs: Enoch, Costello 10; Asts: Baldwin 8 PIR: Enoch, Giedraitis 25	Boxscore	Pts: Mirotić 19; Rebs: Martínez 7 Asts: Laprovíttola 7 PIR: Mirotić 20	Arena: Buesa Arena; Attendance: 7,802; Referees: Emin Moğulkoç, Joseph Bissang, Saulius Račys

11 January 2022 20	Barcelona (Spanish Basketball Federation)	73–75	(Italian Basketball Federation) A|X Armani Exchange Milan	Barcelona
21:00	Scoring by quarter: 14–14, 14–20, 26–13, 19–28
	Pts: Kuric 22; Rebs: Kuric 5 Asts: Jokubaitis 6 PIR: Kuric 29	Boxscore	Pts: Rodríguez 18; Rebs: Hines, Bentil 4 Asts: Rodríguez 4 PIR: Rodríguez 17	Arena: Palau Blaugrana; Attendance: 4,430; Referees: Oļegs Latiševs, Fernando Rocha, Milan Nedović Laurinavičius

13 January 2022 21	Barcelona (Spanish Basketball Federation)	82–77	(Turkish Basketball Federation) Anadolu Efes	Barcelona
21:00	Scoring by quarter: 19–17, 21–24, 21–15, 21–21
	Pts: Jokubaitis 16; Rebs: Şanlı 7 Asts: Laprovíttola 5 PIR: Şanlı 16	Boxscore	Pts: Micić 18; Rebs: Dunston 6 Asts: Larkin 4 PIR: Micić, Larkin 17	Arena: Palau Blaugrana; Attendance: 5,260; Referees: Damir Javor, Borys Ryzhyk, Tomislav Hordov

20 January 2022 22	UNICS (Russian Basketball Federation)	70–64	(Spanish Basketball Federation) Barcelona	Kazan
17:00	Scoring by quarter: 17–14, 14–21, 23–13, 16–16
	Pts: L. Brown 22; Rebs: Hezonja 11; Asts: L. Brown 8 PIR: L. Brown 29	Boxscore	Pts: Higgins 17; Rebs: Šmits 6 Asts: Calathes 5 PIR: Davies 15	Arena: Basket-Hall Kazan; Attendance: 5,251; Referees: Robert Lottermoser, Elias Koromilas, Joseph Bissang

27 January 2022 23	Barcelona (Spanish Basketball Federation)	84–71	(French Federation of Basketball) LDLC ASVEL	Barcelona
21:00	Scoring by quarter: 28–17, 17–13, 23–20, 16–21
	Pts: Laprovíttola 20; Rebs: Mirotić 7 Asts: Calathes 6 PIR: Mirotić 20	euroleaguebasketball.net/en/euroleague/game-center/2021-22/fc-barcelona-ldlc-asvel-villeurbanne/E2021/202/	Pts: Fall 20; Rebs: Fall 7 Asts: Okobo 8 PIR: Fall 30	Arena: Palau Blaugrana; Attendance: 4,466; Referees: Matej Boltauzer, Carmelo Paternicò, Gentian Cici

1 February 2022 24	Barcelona (Spanish Basketball Federation)	71–66	(German Basketball Federation) Bayern Munich	Barcelona
21:00	Scoring by quarter: 9–9, 19–20, 17–12, 26–25
	Pts: Kuric 20; Rebs: Mirotić 6 Asts: Calathes 4 PIR: Mirotić, Kuric 22	Boxscore	Pts: Lučić 16; Rebs: Rubit 10; Asts: Rubit 3 PIR: Lučić 16	Arena: Palau Blaugrana; Attendance: 5,473; Referees: Luigi Lamonica, Sreten Radović, Mario Majkić

3 February 2022 25	Barcelona (Spanish Basketball Federation)	86–60	(Hellenic Basketball Federation) Panathinaikos OPAP	Barcelona
21:00	Scoring by quarter: 17–15, 28–10, 18–17, 23–18
	Pts: Hayes 14; Rebs: Exum 6 Asts: Laprovíttola 4 PIR: Exum, Hayes 17	Boxscore	Pts: Papagiannis 18; Rebs: Papagiannis, White 4 Asts: Macon, White 3 PIR: Papagiannis 21	Arena: Palau Blaugrana; Attendance: 4,980; Referees: Damir Javor, Emin Moğulkoç, Tomasz Trawicki

11 February 2022 26	Real Madrid (Spanish Basketball Federation)	68–86	(Spanish Basketball Federation) Barcelona	Madrid
20:45	Scoring by quarter: 8–28, 23–24, 24–19, 13–15
	Pts: Tavares 25; Rebs: Hanga, Tavares 6 Asts: Llull 4 PIR: Tavares 35	Boxscore	Pts: Laprovíttola 20; Rebs: Laprovíttola 7 Asts: Calathes, Jokubaitis 5 PIR: Laprovíttola 27	Arena: WiZink Center; Attendance: 9,131; Referees: Ilija Belošević, Fernando Rocha, Tomislav Hordov

3 March 2022 28	Barcelona (Spanish Basketball Federation)	88–83	(French Federation of Basketball) AS Monaco	Barcelona
21:00	Scoring by quarter: 20–20, 22–16, 24–26, 22–21
	Pts: Exum 22; Rebs: Calathes 6 Asts: Calathes 6 PIR: Exum 31	Boxscore	Pts: James 19; Rebs: Diallo 8 Asts: James 6 PIR: James 24	Arena: Palau Blaugrana; Attendance: 5,400; Referees: Borys Ryzhyk, Anne Panther, Luka Kardum

11 March 2022 29	Žalgiris (Lithuanian Basketball Federation)	91–84	(Spanish Basketball Federation) Barcelona	Kaunas
19:00	Scoring by quarter: 9–17, 26–18, 21–28, 35–21
	Pts: Lekavičius 22; Rebs: Ulanovas 9 Asts: Lekavičius 4 PIR: Ulanovas 33	Boxscore	Pts: Mirotić 26; Rebs: Mirotić 8 Asts: Calathes 9 PIR: Mirotić 26	Arena: Žalgirio arena Attendance: 12,686; Referees: Mehdi Difallah, Carmelo Paternicò, Seffi Shemmesh

18 March 2022 30	Barcelona (Spanish Basketball Federation)	82–70	(Basketball Federation of Serbia) Crvena zvezda mts	Barcelona
21:00	Scoring by quarter: 22–15, 25–17, 18–19, 17–19
	Pts: Mirotić 19; Rebs: Davies 6 Asts: Calathes 7 PIR: Davies, Mirotić 20	Boxscore	Pts: Dobrić 17; Rebs: Mitrović 6 Asts: Wolters 4 PIR: Dobrić 16	Arena: Palau Blaugrana; Attendance: 5,728; Referees: Oļegs Latiševs, Joseph Bissang, Tomasz Trawicki

22 March 2022 31	ALBA Berlin (German Basketball Federation)	79–95	(Spanish Basketball Federation) Barcelona	Berlin
20:00	Scoring by quarter: 13–21, 26–26, 19–26, 21–22
	Pts: da Silva 13; Rebs: Delow, da Silva 5 Asts: Delow 2 PIR: da Silva 16	Boxscore	Pts: Mirotić 18; Rebs: Davies 7 Asts: Calathes 8 PIR: Mirotić 22	Arena: Max-Schmeling-Halle; Attendance: 4,500; Referees: Sreten Radović, Elias Koromilas, Robert Vyklický

25 March 2022 32	Barcelona (Spanish Basketball Federation)	88–67	(Turkish Basketball Federation) Fenerbahçe Beko	Barcelona
21:00	Scoring by quarter: 25–21, 17–13, 28–15, 18–18
	Pts: Abrines, Mirotić 18; Rebs: Hayes, Calathes 5 Asts: Calathes 10; PIR: Mirotić 20	Boxscore	Pts: Gudurić 15; Rebs: Gudurić 5 Asts: Veselý 3 PIR: Gudurić, Akpınar 11	Arena: Palau Blaugrana; Attendance: 5,969; Referees: Matej Boltauzer, Fernando Rocha, Rain Peerandi

1 April 2022 33	Olympiacos (Hellenic Basketball Federation)	73–66	(Spanish Basketball Federation) Barcelona	Piraeus
20:00	Scoring by quarter: 13–19, 20–21, 18–8, 22–18
	Pts: McKissic 20; Rebs: Papanikolaou 5 Asts: Papanikolaou 3 PIR: McKissic 21	Boxscore	Pts: Şanlı 13; Rebs: Nnaji 7 Asts: Calathes 5 PIR: Šmits 11	Arena: Peace and Friendship Stadium; Attendance: 8,875; Referees: Ilija Belošević, Damir Javor, Anne Panther

7 April 2022 34	Barcelona (Spanish Basketball Federation)	80–104	(Israeli Basketball Association) Maccabi Tel Aviv	Barcelona
20:00	Scoring by quarter: 23–27, 23–30, 22–19, 12–28
	Pts: Abrines 17; Rebs: three players 4 Asts: Calathes 9 PIR: three players 14	Boxscore	Pts: Wilbekin 20; Rebs: Nunnally, Caloiaro 6 Asts: Evans 5 PIR: Nunnally 23	Arena: Palau Blaugrana; Attendance: 4,597; Referees: Luigi Lamonica, Borys Ryzhyk, Miloje Jovčić

=== EuroLeague Playoffs ===
==== Playoff series ====
19 April 2022 Game 1	Barcelona (Spanish Basketball Federation)	77–67	(German Basketball Federation) Bayern Munich	Barcelona
21:00 (CEST)	Scoring by quarter: 20–22, 23–11, 19–18, 15–16
	Pts: Davies 19; Rebs: Davies 5 Asts: Jokubaitis, Calathes 5 PIR: Davies 24	Report	Pts: Lučić 20; Rebs: Weiler-Babb, Rubit 6 Asts: four players 2 PIR: Lučić 19	Arena: Palau Blaugrana; Attendance: 6,032; Referees: Matej Boltauzer, Oļegs Latiševs, Uroš Nikolić

21 April 2022 Game 2	Barcelona (Spanish Basketball Federation)	75–90	(German Basketball Federation) Bayern Munich	Barcelona
20:00 (CEST)	Scoring by quarter: 18–23, 17–25, 21–19, 19–23
	Pts: Laprovíttola, Mirotić 16; Rebs: Mirotić 6 Asts: Calathes 8 PIR: Calathes 17	Report	Pts: Thomas 25; Rebs: Rubit, Weiler-Babb 8 Asts: Jaramaz 5 PIR: Thomas 29	Arena: Palau Blaugrana; Attendance: 6,273; Referees: Ilija Belošević, Damir Javor, Tomislav Hordov

27 April 2022 Game 3	Bayern Munich (German Basketball Federation)	66–75	(Spanish Basketball Federation) Barcelona	Munich
20:30 (CEST)	Scoring by quarter: 17–26, 14–23, 18–10, 17–16
	Pts: Lučić 17; Rebs: Rubit 8 Asts: Weiler-Babb 4 PIR: Rubit 27	Report	Pts: Mirotić 25; Rebs: Calathes 7 Asts: Calathes 8 PIR: Mirotić 31	Arena: Audi Dome; Attendance: 6,500; Referees: Borys Ryzhyk, Sreten Radović, Mehdi Difallah

29 April 2022 Game 4	Bayern Munich (German Basketball Federation)	59–52	(Spanish Basketball Federation) Barcelona	Munich
20:45 (CEST)	Scoring by quarter: 18–12, 18–13, 14–9, 9–18
	Pts: Weiler-Babb 12; Rebs: Weiler-Babb 8 Asts: Weiler-Babb 4 PIR: Weiler-Babb 24	Report	Pts: Abrines 12; Rebs: Davies 11; Asts: Calathes, Jokubaitis 3 PIR: Abrines 13	Arena: Audi Dome; Attendance: 6,500; Referees: Luigi Lamonica, Saša Pukl, Uroš Nikolić

3 May 2022 Game 5	Barcelona (Spanish Basketball Federation)	81–72	(German Basketball Federation) Bayern Munich	Barcelona
20:00 (CEST)	Scoring by quarter: 18–19, 13–18, 29–15, 21–20
	Pts: Laprovíttola 26; Rebs: Abrines 7 Asts: Calathes 5 PIR: Laprovíttola 30	Report	Pts: Hunter 18; Rebs: Lučić 10; Asts: Weiler-Babb 4 PIR: Lučić 21	Arena: Palau Blaugrana; Attendance: 7,444; Referees: Borys Ryzhyk, Oļegs Latiševs, Mehdi Difallah

=== EuroLeague Final Four ===
19 May 2022 Semifinal	Barcelona (Spanish Basketball Federation)	83–86	(Spanish Basketball Federation) Real Madrid	Belgrade
21:00	Scoring by quarter: 19–19, 26–15, 11–26, 27–26
	Pts: Mirotić 26; Rebs: Mirotić 12; Asts: Calathes 9 PIR: Mirotić 39	Boxscore	Pts: Yabusele, Causeur 18; Rebs: Yabusele 8 Asts: Hanga, Llull 3 PIR: Yabusele 24	Arena: Štark Arena; Attendance: 13,173; Referees: Luigi Lamonica, Ilija Belošević, Mehdi Difallah

21 May 2022 Third place	Barcelona (Spanish Basketball Federation)	84–74	(Hellenic Basketball Federation) Olympiacos	Belgrade
16:00	Scoring by quarter: 20–18, 25–20, 17–18, 22–18
	Pts: Mirotić 19; Rebs: Calathes 8 Asts: Calathes 13; PIR: Mirotić 27	Boxscore	Pts: Vezenkov 20; Rebs: Vezenkov 11; Asts: Sloukas 7 PIR: Vezenkov 27	Arena: Štark Arena; Attendance: 12,127; Referees: Ilija Belošević, Oļegs Latiševs, Damir Javor

=== Copa del Rey ===
==== Quarterfinals ====
18 February 2022	Barça	107–70	Baxi Manresa	Granada
21:30	Scoring by quarter: 22–26, 30–16, 36–11, 19–17
	Pts: Davies, Mirotić 14; Rebs: Davies, Abrines 5 Asts: Calathes 6 PIR: Mirotić 21	Boxscore	Pts: Francisco 19; Rebs: Bako 6 Asts: García 3 PIR: Francisco 19	Arena: Palacio de Deportes; Attendance: 6,707; Referees: Miguel Ángel Pérez Pérez, Antonio Conde, Óscar Perea

==== Semifinals ====
19 February 2022	Barça	103–90	UCAM Murcia	Granada
21:30	Scoring by quarter: 32–16, 23–33, 18–23, 30–18
	Pts: Laprovíttola 19; Rebs: Mirotić 8 Asts: Calathes 8 PIR: Mirotić 30	Boxscore	Pts: Taylor 21; Rebs: Webb 9 Asts: Taylor 7 PIR: Taylor 24	Arena: Palacio de Deportes; Attendance: 6,787; Referees: Daniel Hierrezuelo, Antonio Conde, Martín Caballero

==== Final ====
20 February 2022	Real Madrid	59–64	Barça	Granada
18:30	Scoring by quarter: 19–5, 10–13, 17–23, 13–23
	Pts: Heurtel 10; Rebs: three players 5 Asts: Abalde 2 PIR: Hanga, Taylor 7	Boxscore	Pts: Mirotić 19; Rebs: Şanlı 6 Asts: Calathes 6 PIR: Mirotić 19	Arena: Palacio de Deportes; Attendance: 6,918; Referees: Emilio Pérez Pizarro, Antonio Conde, Fernando Calatrava

=== Supercopa de España ===
==== Semifinals ====
11 September 2021	Barça	87–68	Valencia Basket	La Laguna
19:00	Scoring by quarter: 27–16, 18–12, 22–16, 20–24
	Pts: Davies 15; Rebs: three players 5 Asts: Calathes 6 PIR: Davies 20	Boxscore	Pts: Hermannsson, Puerto 11; Rebs: Dubljević 7 Asts: Hermannsson 3 PIR: Hermannsson 13	Arena: Santiago Martín; Attendance: 2,200; Referees: Carlos Peruga, Luis Miguel Castillo, Martín Caballero

==== Final ====
12 September 2021	Barça	83–88	Real Madrid	La Laguna
18:30	Scoring by quarter: 23–22, 23–18, 25–22, 12–26
	Pts: Higgins 16; Rebs: Mirotić, Oriola 5 Asts: Calathes 7 PIR: Calathes 18	Boxscore	Pts: Llull 24; Rebs: Poirier 11; Asts: Williams-Goss, Yabusele 3 PIR: Llull 27	Arena: Santiago Martín; Attendance: 2,200; Referees: Emilio Pérez Pizarro, Carlos Peruga, Luis Miguel Castillo

== Individual awards ==
=== Copa del Rey ===
Finals MVP

- (Spain) Nikola Mirotić

=== Liga ACB ===
All-Liga ACB First Team

- (Argentina) Nicolás Laprovíttola

All-Liga ACB Second Team

- (Spain) Nikola Mirotić

Best All-Young Team

- (Lithuania) Rokas Jokubaitis

Player of the Round

- (Spain) Nikola Mirotić – Round 2, Round 3

Player of the month

- (Spain) Nikola Mirotić – September

=== EuroLeague ===
EuroLeague MVP

- (Spain) Nikola Mirotić

All-EuroLeague First Team

- (Spain) Nikola Mirotić

Rising Star

- (Lithuania) Rokas Jokubaitis

MVP of the Round

- (Uganda) Brandon Davies – Round 4, Round 1 of the Playoffs
- (Spain) Nikola Mirotić – Round 9, Round 14, Round 3 of the Playoffs
- (Argentina) Nicolás Laprovíttola – Round 26, Round 6 of the Playoffs
- (Australia) Danté Exum – Round 28

MVP of the Month

- (Spain) Nikola Mirotić – October, December
