= 2022 EuroLeague Playoffs =

Postseason playoffs of the EuroLeague basketball tournament

The 2022 EuroLeague Playoffs, known as the 2022 Turkish Airlines EuroLeague Playoffs for sponsorship purposes, was the first postseason portion of the 2021–22 EuroLeague basketball competition. They began on 19 April 2022 and were scheduled to be played through 4 May 2022. The top eight finishers in the regular season qualified for the playoffs, which consists of four series of two teams each, played in a best-of-five format. The winners of each of the playoffs series advanced to the Final Four, which determined the EuroLeague champion for the 2021–22 season.

Turkish club Anadolu Efes entered the playoffs as the defending league champion, after having won their playoffs series and final four matches during the previous season.

== Qualified teams ==
Pos	Team	Pld	W	L	PF	PA	PD	Qualification
1	(Spanish Basketball Federation) Barcelona	28	21	7	2275	2101	+174	Higher seed in playoffs series
2	(Hellenic Basketball Federation) Olympiacos	28	19	9	2222	2045	+177	Higher seed in playoffs series
3	(Italian Basketball Federation) A|X Armani Exchange Milan	28	19	9	2069	1992	+77	Higher seed in playoffs series
4	(Spanish Basketball Federation) Real Madrid	28	18	10	2181	2079	+102	Higher seed in playoffs series
5	(Israeli Basketball Association) Maccabi Tel Aviv	28	17	11	2272	2209	+63	Lower seed in playoffs series
6	(Turkish Basketball Federation) Anadolu Efes	28	16	12	2322	2221	+101	Lower seed in playoffs series
7	(French Federation of Basketball) AS Monaco	28	15	13	2311	2225	+86	Lower seed in playoffs series
8	(German Basketball Federation) Bayern Munich	28	14	14	2123	2105	+18	Lower seed in playoffs series

Source: EuroLeague
Rules for classification: All points scored in extra period(s) were not counted in the standings, nor for any tie-break situation.

=== Tiebreakers ===
When more than two teams are tied, the ranking will be established taking into account the victories obtained in the games played only among them. Should the tie persist among some, but not all, of the teams, the ranking of the teams still tied will be determined by again taking into account the victories in the games played only among them, and repeating this same procedure until the tie is entirely resolved. If a tie persists, the ranking will be determined by the goal difference in favour and against in the games played only among the teams still tied.

== Series ==
The first playoff series was determined on 6 April 2022, when Bayern Munich lost a match in Istanbul to the defending league champions Anadolu Efes. This result confirmed that they would finish the regular season in eighth place, and therefore would face the No. 1 seed in the playoffs, Barcelona. The result between Bayern and Anadolu Efes also secured the seventh-place spot for AS Monaco, who will make their first EuroLeague Playoffs appearance. The other five spots in the quarterfinals were determined on 13 April 2022, after match week 34, which was also the conclusion of the regular season.

The full schedule, with dates and times for the playoff games, was announced on 9 April 2022. Mediolanum Forum in Assago will host the playoffs' opening game, when Armani Exchange Milan plays Anadolu Efes on 19 April 2022 at 19:00 CEST, and two games will be played on each match day. The games will be played in a 2–2–1 series format, wherein the higher seed will host the first two games, the lower seed will host the third and fourth games, and the higher seed will return to host the fifth and final game of each series; the fourth and fifth games of each series will be played if necessary. The four series winners will advance to the 2022 EuroLeague Final Four, to be played in Belgrade on 19 and 21 May 2022.

Team 1	Series	Team 2	Game 1	Game 2	Game 3	Game 4	Game 5
Barcelona (Spain)	3–2	(Germany) Bayern Munich	77–67	75–90	75–66	52–59	81–72
Real Madrid (Spain)	3–0	(Israel) Maccabi Tel Aviv	84–74	95–66	87–76	–	–
A|X Armani Exchange Milan (Italy)	1–3	(Turkey) Anadolu Efes	48–64	73–66	65–77	70–75	–
Olympiacos (Greece)	3–2	(France) AS Monaco	71–54	72–96	87–83	77–78	94–88

=== Barcelona vs. Bayern Munich ===
19 April 2022 Game 1	Barcelona (Spanish Basketball Federation)	77–67 (Series: 1–0)	(German Basketball Federation) Bayern Munich	Barcelona
21:00 (CEST)	Scoring by quarter: 20–22, 23–11, 19–18, 15–16
	Pts: Davies 19; Rebs: Davies 5 Asts: Jokubaitis, Calathes 5 PIR: Davies 24	Report	Pts: Lučić 20; Rebs: Weiler-Babb, Rubit 6 Asts: four players 2 PIR: Lučić 19	Arena: Palau Blaugrana; Attendance: 6,032; Referees: Matej Boltauzer, Oļegs Latiševs, Uroš Nikolić

21 April 2022 Game 2	Barcelona (Spanish Basketball Federation)	75–90 (Series: 1–1)	(German Basketball Federation) Bayern Munich	Barcelona
20:00 (CEST)	Scoring by quarter: 18–23, 17–25, 21–19, 19–23
	Pts: Laprovíttola, Mirotić 16; Rebs: Mirotić 6 Asts: Calathes 8 PIR: Calathes 17	Report	Pts: Thomas 25; Rebs: Rubit, Weiler-Babb 8 Asts: Jaramaz 5 PIR: Thomas 29	Arena: Palau Blaugrana; Attendance: 6,273; Referees: Ilija Belošević, Damir Javor, Tomislav Hordov

27 April 2022 Game 3	Bayern Munich (German Basketball Federation)	66–75 (Series: 1–2)	(Spanish Basketball Federation) Barcelona	Munich
20:30 (CEST)	Scoring by quarter: 17–26, 14–23, 18–10, 17–16
	Pts: Lučić 17; Rebs: Rubit 8 Asts: Weiler-Babb 4 PIR: Rubit 27	Report	Pts: Mirotić 25; Rebs: Calathes 7 Asts: Calathes 8 PIR: Mirotić 31	Arena: Audi Dome; Attendance: 6,500; Referees: Borys Ryzhyk, Sreten Radović, Mehdi Difallah

29 April 2022 Game 4	Bayern Munich (German Basketball Federation)	59–52 (Series: 2–2)	(Spanish Basketball Federation) Barcelona	Munich
20:45 (CEST)	Scoring by quarter: 18–12, 18–13, 14–9, 9–18
	Pts: Weiler-Babb 12; Rebs: Weiler-Babb 8 Asts: Weiler-Babb 4 PIR: Weiler-Babb 24	Report	Pts: Abrines 12; Rebs: Davies 11; Asts: Calathes, Jokubaitis 3 PIR: Abrines 13	Arena: Audi Dome; Attendance: 6,500; Referees: Luigi Lamonica, Saša Pukl, Uroš Nikolić

3 May 2022 Game 5	Barcelona (Spanish Basketball Federation)	81–72 (Series: 3–2)	(German Basketball Federation) Bayern Munich	Barcelona
20:00 (CEST)	Scoring by quarter: 18–19, 13–18, 29–15, 21–20
	Pts: Laprovíttola 26; Rebs: Abrines 7 Asts: Calathes 5 PIR: Laprovíttola 30	Report	Pts: Hunter 18; Rebs: Lučić 10; Asts: Weiler-Babb 4 PIR: Lučić 21	Arena: Palau Blaugrana; Attendance: 7,444; Referees: Borys Ryzhyk, Oļegs Latiševs, Mehdi Difallah

=== Real Madrid vs. Maccabi Tel Aviv ===
20 April 2022 Game 1	Real Madrid (Spanish Basketball Federation)	84–74 (Series: 1–0)	(Israeli Basketball Association) Maccabi Tel Aviv	Madrid
21:00 (CEST)	Scoring by quarter: 25–19, 22–19, 18–18, 19–18
	Pts: Causeur 20; Rebs: Tavares 6 Asts: Williams-Goss 8 PIR: Causeur 21	Report	Pts: Wilbekin 20; Rebs: Sorkin 5 Asts: Wilbekin, DiBartolomeo 3 PIR: Wilbekin 21	Arena: WiZink Center; Attendance: 7,634; Referees: Luigi Lamonica, Gytis Vilius, Fernando Rocha

22 April 2022 Game 2	Real Madrid (Spanish Basketball Federation)	95–66 (Series: 2–0)	(Israeli Basketball Association) Maccabi Tel Aviv	Madrid
20:45 (CEST)	Scoring by quarter: 35–26, 21–11, 18–11, 21–18
	Pts: Llull 17; Rebs: Poirier 10; Asts: four players 3 PIR: Poirier 31	Report	Pts: Evans 9 Rebs: Reynolds 5 Asts: three players 2 PIR: DiBartolomeo 10	Arena: WiZink Center; Attendance: 8,046; Referees: Borys Ryzhyk, Mehdi Difallah, Robert Lottermoser

26 April 2022 Game 3	Maccabi Tel Aviv (Israeli Basketball Association)	76–87 (Series: 0−3)	(Spanish Basketball Federation) Real Madrid	Tel Aviv
20:15 (CEST)	Scoring by quarter: 22–25, 19–26, 20–22, 15−14
	Pts: Wilbekin 22; Rebs: Nunnally 5 Asts: Nunnally, Wilbekin 3 PIR: Wilbekin 16	Report	Pts: Llull 18; Rebs: Hanga 10; Asts: Llull 6 PIR: Yabusele 25	Arena: Menora Mivtachim Arena; Attendance: 10,360; Referees: Damir Javor, Tomislav Hordov, Uroš Nikolić

=== A|X Armani Exchange Milan vs. Anadolu Efes ===
19 April 2022 Game 1	A|X Armani Exchange Milan (Italian Basketball Federation)	48–64 (Series: 0–1)	(Turkish Basketball Federation) Anadolu Efes	Assago
19:00 (CEST)	Scoring by quarter: 16–11, 10–18, 8–17, 14–18
	Pts: Melli 10; Rebs: Melli 6 Asts: Delaney 3 PIR: Melli 15	Report	Pts: Larkin, Micić 16; Rebs: Moerman, Micić 7 Asts: Larkin 5 PIR: Larkin 15	Arena: Mediolanum Forum; Attendance: 6,980; Referees: Robert Lottermoser, Juan Carlos Garcia, Damir Javor

21 April 2022 Game 2	A|X Armani Exchange Milan (Italian Basketball Federation)	73–66 (Series: 1–1)	(Turkish Basketball Federation) Anadolu Efes	Assago
20:30 (CEST)	Scoring by quarter: 19–17, 14–16, 20–19, 20–14
	Pts: Shields 21; Rebs: Shields 8 Asts: Rodríguez 5 PIR: Rodríguez 27	Report	Pts: Larkin 19; Rebs: Dunston 6 Asts: Micić 4 PIR: Larkin 19	Arena: Mediolanum Forum; Attendance: 8,900; Referees: Saša Pukl, Oļegs Latiševs, Anne Panther

26 April 2022 Game 3	Anadolu Efes (Turkish Basketball Federation)	77–65 (Series: 2–1)	(Italian Basketball Federation) A|X Armani Exchange Milan	Istanbul
19:30 (CEST)	Scoring by quarter: 25–17, 17–18, 17–21, 18–9
	Pts: Micić 20; Rebs: Moerman, Pleiß 5 Asts: Larkin, Micić 5 PIR: Larkin 24	Report	Pts: Hall 16; Rebs: Shields 6 Asts: Hall 5 PIR: Hall 22	Arena: Sinan Erdem Dome; Attendance: 15,108; Referees: Ilija Belošević, Matej Boltauzer, Emilio Pérez

28 April 2022 Game 4	Anadolu Efes (Turkish Basketball Federation)	75–70 (Series: 3–1)	(Italian Basketball Federation) A|X Armani Exchange Milan	Istanbul
19:30 (CEST)	Scoring by quarter: 19–11, 23–32, 20–15, 13–12
	Pts: Pleiß 25; Rebs: Pleiß 6 Asts: Larkin 7 PIR: Pleiß 37	Report	Pts: Datome 21; Rebs: Hines 12; Asts: Rodríguez 7 PIR: Hines 21	Arena: Sinan Erdem Dome; Attendance: 15,121; Referees: Damir Javor, Fernando Rocha, Gytis Vilius

=== Olympiacos vs. AS Monaco ===
20 April 2022 Game 1	Olympiacos (Hellenic Basketball Federation)	71–54 (Series: 1–0)	(French Federation of Basketball) AS Monaco	Piraeus
21:00 (EEST)	Scoring by quarter: 8–15, 25–11, 17–10, 21–18
	Pts: Printezis, McKissic 12; Rebs: Jean-Charles 7 Asts: Sloukas 6 PIR: Sloukas 15	Report	Pts: James, Hall 10; Rebs: James 6 Asts: James, Lee 4 PIR: James 14	Arena: Peace and Friendship Stadium; Attendance: 11,580; Referees: Sreten Radović, Emilio Pérez, Milan Nedović

22 April 2022 Game 2	Olympiacos (Hellenic Basketball Federation)	72–96 (Series: 1–1)	(French Federation of Basketball) AS Monaco	Piraeus
19:00 (EEST)	Scoring by quarter: 16–10, 12–30, 23–29, 21–27
	Pts: Vezenkov 14; Rebs: Papanikolaou 6 Asts: Sloukas, Walkup 4 PIR: Vezenkov 19	Report	Pts: James 23; Rebs: Bacon 6 Asts: Lee 4 PIR: Anđušić 23	Arena: Peace and Friendship Stadium; Attendance: 10,457; Referees: Luigi Lamonica, Matej Boltauzer, Gytis Vilius

27 April 2022 Game 3	AS Monaco (French Federation of Basketball)	83–87 (Series: 1–2)	(Hellenic Basketball Federation) Olympiacos	Fontvieille
21:00 (CEST)	Scoring by quarter: 23–19, 18–26, 17–26, 25–16
	Pts: Bacon 23; Rebs: Thomas 8 Asts: James 8 PIR: James 22	Report	Pts: Sloukas 21; Rebs: Vezenkov 9 Asts: Walkup 6 PIR: Vezenkov 24	Arena: Salle Gaston Médecin; Attendance: 4,084; Referees: Saša Pukl, Juan Carlos García, Anne Panther

29 April 2022 Game 4	AS Monaco (French Federation of Basketball)	78–77 (Series: 2–2)	(Hellenic Basketball Federation) Olympiacos	Fontvieille
21:00 (CEST)	Scoring by quarter: 19–19, 19–23, 27–19, 13–16
	Pts: Bacon 21; Rebs: Hall 10; Asts: James, Bacon 4 PIR: Hall 25	Report	Pts: Sloukas 19; Rebs: Fall, Vezenkov 8 Asts: Vezenkov 5 PIR: Sloukas, Vezenkov 22	Arena: Salle Gaston Médecin; Attendance: 4,084; Referees: Borys Ryzhyk, Robert Lottermoser, Tomislav Hordov

4 May 2022 Game 5	Olympiacos (Hellenic Basketball Federation)	94–88 (Series: 3–2)	(French Federation of Basketball) AS Monaco	Piraeus
21:30 (EEST)	Scoring by quarter: 11–13, 30–35, 25–22, 28–18
	Pts: McKissic 18; Rebs: Vezenkov 7 Asts: Sloukas 5 PIR: McKissic 24	Report	Pts: James 24; Rebs: Thomas 8 Asts: James 10; PIR: James 26	Arena: Peace and Friendship Stadium; Attendance: 11,847; Referees: Luigi Lamonica, Sreten Radović, Emilio Pérez
