= 2022 Copa del Rey de Baloncesto =

86th edition of the Spanish Basketball King's Cup

2022 Copa del Rey

Tournament details
- Country: Spain
- City: Granada
- Venue: Palacio de Deportes
- Dates: 17–20 February 2022
- Teams: 8
- Defending champions: Barça

Final positions
- Champions: Barça (27th title)
- Runners-up: Real Madrid
- Semifinalists: UCAM Murcia; Lenovo Tenerife

Tournament statistics
- Matches played: 7
- Attendance: 45,229 (6,461 per match)

Awards
- MVP: Nikola Mirotić (Barça)

The 2022 Copa del Rey de Baloncesto was the 86th edition of the Spanish Basketball King's Cup. It was managed by the ACB and was held in Granada, in the Palacio de Deportes in February 2022.

Barça defended successfully the title and conquered its second consecutive cup, 27th overall.

All times were in Central European Time (UTC+01:00).

== Qualified teams ==
The top eight ranking teams after the first half of the 2021–22 ACB regular season participated in the cup.

On December 27, 2021, the ACB clubs agreed unanimously to extend the scheduled date for the end of the first half of the regular season and qualification for the Copa del Rey no later than January 30, thus facilitating the recovery of postponed matches and competitive equality between all clubs. Since all the scheduled matches have not been played as of January 30, the win percentage as of January 30 was taken as the main criterion for qualifying for the Copa del Rey, counting only the matches corresponding to the first half of the regular season.

Pos	Team	Pld	W	L	PF	PA	PD	PCT	Qualification
1	Real Madrid	17	15	2	1401	1203	+198	.882	Qualification as seeded team
2	Barça	16	13	3	1310	1171	+139	.813	Qualification as seeded team
3	Valencia Basket	17	11	6	1414	1331	+83	.647	Qualification as seeded team
4	Joventut	17	11	6	1404	1332	+72	.647	Qualification as seeded team
5	Baxi Manresa	17	11	6	1444	1417	+27	.647	Qualification as unseeded team
6	UCAM Murcia	17	10	7	1476	1391	+85	.588	Qualification as unseeded team
7	Río Breogán	17	9	8	1412	1365	+47	.529	Qualification as unseeded team
8	Lenovo Tenerife	17	9	8	1395	1375	+20	.529	Qualification as unseeded team

Updated to match(es) played on 30 January 2022. Source: ACB
Rules for classification: 1) Win percentage; 2) Point difference; 3) Sum of quotients of points scored

== Venue ==
On November 11, 2021, ACB selected and announced Granada to host the Copa del Rey in February 2022. The arena, which was opened in 1991, is primarily used for basketball and is the home arena of Fundación CB Granada, since 2015. The arena hosted the 1999 UEFA Futsal Championship and the matches of the Group A in EuroBasket 2007. In 2014, the arena also hosted the matches of the group of Spanish national team in the 2014 FIBA Basketball World Cup.

Granada	2022 Copa del Rey de Baloncesto (Spain)
Palacio de Deportes	2022 Copa del Rey de Baloncesto (Spain)
Capacity: 7,242	2022 Copa del Rey de Baloncesto (Spain)

== Draw ==
The draw was held on 31 January 2021 in Granada, Spain. The top four ranking teams act as seeded teams in the draw of the quarterfinals. For its part, the top ranking team played its quarterfinal match on Thursday.

== Bracket ==
Quarterfinals
Real Madrid	73
Río Breogán	67
Joventut	62
Lenovo Tenerife	64
Barça	107
Baxi Manresa	70
Valencia Basket	83
UCAM Murcia	86

Semifinals
Real Madrid	94
Lenovo Tenerife	74
Barça	103
UCAM Murcia	90

Final
Real Madrid	59
Barça	64

== Quarterfinals ==
=== Joventut vs. Lenovo Tenerife ===
17 February 2022	Joventut	62–64	Lenovo Tenerife	Granada
18:30	Scoring by quarter: 10–21, 13–15, 16–15, 23–13
	Pts: Tomić 15; Rebs: Parra, Tomić 9 Asts: Ribas 4 PIR: Parra 21	Boxscore	Pts: Shermadini 12; Rebs: Shermadini, Doornekamp 8 Asts: Huertas, Sastre 3 PIR: Shermadini 18	Arena: Palacio de Deportes; Attendance: 5,421; Referees: Emilio Pérez Pizarro, Fernando Calatrava, Martín Caballero

=== Real Madrid vs. Río Breogán ===
17 February 2022	Real Madrid	73–67	Río Breogán	Granada
21:30	Scoring by quarter: 27–16, 14–15, 16–19, 16–17
	Pts: Yabusele 17; Rebs: Tavares 11; Asts: Heurtel 10; PIR: Tavares 22	Boxscore	Pts: Mahalbašić 16; Rebs: Musa 9 Asts: Musa 4 PIR: Musa 18	Arena: Palacio de Deportes; Attendance: 6,319; Referees: Daniel Hierrezuelo, Carlos Peruga, Jordi Aliaga

=== Valencia Basket vs. UCAM Murcia ===
18 February 2022	Valencia Basket	83–86	UCAM Murcia	Granada
18:30	Scoring by quarter: 14–28, 19–24, 31–9, 19–25
	Pts: Rivero 20; Rebs: Dubljević, Rivero 6 Asts: Van Rossom 7 PIR: Rivero 25	Boxscore	Pts: McFadden 20; Rebs: Lima, Radović 6 Asts: Bellas 6 PIR: McFadden 18	Arena: Palacio de Deportes; Attendance: 6,159; Referees: Juan Carlos García González, Benjamín Jiménez, Carlos Cortés

=== Barça vs. Baxi Manresa ===
18 February 2022	Barça	107–70	Baxi Manresa	Granada
21:30	Scoring by quarter: 22–26, 30–16, 36–11, 19–17
	Pts: Davies, Mirotić 14; Rebs: Davies, Abrines 5 Asts: Calathes 6 PIR: Mirotić 21	Boxscore	Pts: Francisco 19; Rebs: Bako 6 Asts: García 3 PIR: Francisco 19	Arena: Palacio de Deportes; Attendance: 6,707; Referees: Miguel Ángel Pérez Pérez, Antonio Conde, Óscar Perea

== Semifinals ==
=== Real Madrid vs. Lenovo Tenerife ===
19 February 2022	Real Madrid	94–74	Lenovo Tenerife	Granada
18:30	Scoring by quarter: 26–20, 24–18, 23–17, 21–19
	Pts: Tavares 15; Rebs: Fernández, Yabusele 5 Asts: Heurtel 7 PIR: Tavares 19	Boxscore	Pts: Shermadini 14; Rebs: Wiltjer 6 Asts: Sastre 4 PIR: Shermadini 15	Arena: Palacio de Deportes; Attendance: 6,918; Referees: Carlos Peruga, Benjamín Jiménez, Óscar Perea

=== Barça vs. UCAM Murcia ===
19 February 2022	Barça	103–90	UCAM Murcia	Granada
21:30	Scoring by quarter: 32–16, 23–33, 18–23, 30–18
	Pts: Laprovíttola 19; Rebs: Mirotić 8 Asts: Calathes 8 PIR: Mirotić 30	Boxscore	Pts: Taylor 21; Rebs: Webb 9 Asts: Taylor 7 PIR: Taylor 24	Arena: Palacio de Deportes; Attendance: 6,787; Referees: Daniel Hierrezuelo, Antonio Conde, Martín Caballero

== Final ==
20 February 2022	Real Madrid	59–64	Barça	Granada
18:30	Scoring by quarter: 19–5, 10–13, 17–23, 13–23
	Pts: Heurtel 10; Rebs: three players 5 Asts: Abalde 2 PIR: Hanga, Taylor 7	Boxscore	Pts: Mirotić 19; Rebs: Şanlı 6 Asts: Calathes 6 PIR: Mirotić 19	Arena: Palacio de Deportes; Attendance: 6,918; Referees: Emilio Pérez Pizarro, Antonio Conde, Fernando Calatrava

2022 Copa del Rey champions
Barça
27th title
