= 2022 EuroLeague Final Four =

Basketball tournament in Belgrade

- Season: 2021–22 EuroLeague

Tournament details
- Arena: Štark Arena; Belgrade, Serbia
- Dates: 19–21 May 2022

Final positions
- Champions: (Turkish Basketball Federation) Anadolu Efes (2nd title)
- Runners-up: (Spanish Basketball Federation) Real Madrid
- Third place: (Spanish Basketball Federation) Barcelona
- Fourth place: (Hellenic Basketball Federation) Olympiacos

Awards and statistics
- MVP: (Serbia) Vasilije Micić
- Top scorer(s): (Spain) Nikola Mirotic (45 Points)

The 2022 EuroLeague Final Four was the concluding EuroLeague Final Four tournament of the 2021–22 EuroLeague season, the 65th season of Europe's premier club basketball tournament, and the 22nd season since it was first organised by Euroleague Basketball. It was the 35th Final Four of the modern EuroLeague Final Four era (1988–present), and the 37th time overall that the competition has concluded with a final four format. The venue initially selected was Berlin, Germany; however, Euroleague Basketball later announced that the Final Four would be played at the Štark Arena in Belgrade, Serbia, on 19–21 May 2022.

== Venue ==
The Final Four was originally scheduled to be played at the Mercedes-Benz Arena in Berlin, Germany, on 27–29 May 2022. However, Euroleague Basketball announced on 4 March 2022 that the Berlin Final Four was postponed due to the pandemic situation and health measures imposed in the German capital and would be held at the Štark Arena in Belgrade, Serbia, on 19–21 May 2022.

Štark Arena also hosted the 2018 EuroLeague Final Four.

Belgrade	2022 EuroLeague Final Four (Europe)
Štark Arena	2022 EuroLeague Final Four (Europe)
Capacity: 18,386	2022 EuroLeague Final Four (Europe)

== Teams ==
Team	Qualified date	Participations (bold indicates winners)
(Spanish Basketball Federation) Barcelona	3 May 2022	15 (1989, 1990, 1991, 1994, 1996, 1997, 2000, **2003**, 2006, 2009, **2010**, 2012, 2013, 2014, 2021)
(Spanish Basketball Federation) Real Madrid	26 April 2022	11 (**1967**, 1993, **1995**, 1996, 2011, 2013, 2014, **2015**, 2017, **2018**, 2019)
(Hellenic Basketball Federation) Olympiacos	4 May 2022	10 (1994, 1995, **1997**, 1999, 2009, 2010, **2012**, **2013**, 2015, 2017)
(Turkish Basketball Federation) Anadolu Efes	28 April 2022	4 (2000, 2001, 2019, **2021**)

== Bracket ==
Semifinals
19 May
(Spanish Basketball Federation) Barcelona	83
**(Spanish Basketball Federation) Real Madrid**	**86**
19 May
(Hellenic Basketball Federation) Olympiacos	74
**(Turkish Basketball Federation) Anadolu Efes**	**77**

Championship game
21 May
(Spanish Basketball Federation) Real Madrid	57
**(Turkish Basketball Federation) Anadolu Efes**	**58**
Third place game
21 May
**(Spanish Basketball Federation) Barcelona**	**84**
(Hellenic Basketball Federation) Olympiacos	74

== Semifinals ==
=== Semifinal A ===
19 May 2022	Barcelona (Spanish Basketball Federation)	83–**86**	(Spanish Basketball Federation) **Real Madrid**	Belgrade, Serbia
21:00 (CEST)	Scoring by quarter: 19–19, **26**–15, 11–**26**, **27**–26
	Pts: Mirotić 26; Rebs: Mirotić 12; Asts: Calathes 9 PIR: Mirotić 39	Boxscore	Pts: Yabusele, Causeur 18; Rebs: Yabusele 8 Asts: Hanga, Llull 3 PIR: Yabusele 24	Arena: Štark Arena; Attendance: 13,173; Referees: (Italian Basketball Federation) Luigi Lamonica, (Basketball Federation of Serbia) Ilija Belošević, (French Federation of Basketball) Mehdi Difallah

Starters:			Pts	Reb	Ast
PG	99	(Greece) Nick Calathes	4	3	9
SG	20	(Argentina) Nicolas Laprovíttola	17	1	2
SF	1	(Australia) Dante Exum	7	1	1
PF	33	(Spain) Nikola Mirotić	26	12	5
C	5	(Turkey) Sertaç Şanlı	2	2	0
Reserves:					
C	0	(Uganda) Brandon Davies	15	5	2
PF	10	(Latvia) Rolands Šmits	1	2	1
F	14	(United States) Nigel Hayes	0	3	0
SF	21	(Spain) Álex Abrines	7	1	0
SG	22	(United States) Cory Higgins	0	1	0
SG	24	(Slovakia) Kyle Kuric	0	0	0
PG	31	(Lithuania) Rokas Jokubaitis	4	1	0
Head coach:
(Lithuanian Basketball Federation) Šarūnas Jasikevičius

**Barcelona**	**Real Madrid**

Barcelona	Statistics	Real Madrid
22/43 (51.2%)	2-pt field goals	22/44 (50%)
8/20 (40%)	3-pt field goals	8/21 (38.1%)
15/21 (71.4%)	Free throws	18/22 (81.8%)
12	Offensive rebounds	14
22	Defensive rebounds	21
34	Total rebounds	35
20	Assists	14
9	Turnovers	9
4	Steals	4
1	Blocks	6
22	Fouls	23

Starters:			Pts	Reb	Ast
PG	0	(United States) Nigel Williams-Goss	0	0	1
SG	1	(France) Fabien Causeur	18	1	2
SF	8	(Hungary) Ádám Hanga	4	3	3
PF	14	(Argentina) Gabriel Deck	7	7	1
C	28	(France) Guerschon Yabusele	18	8	1
Reserves:					
PF	3	(Slovenia) Anthony Randolph	DNP		
SG	5	(Spain) Rudy Fernández	3	0	0
SF	6	(Spain) Alberto Abalde	7	1	0
C	17	(France) Vincent Poirier	6	5	1
C	22	(Cape Verde) Edy Tavares	8	3	2
G	23	(Spain) Sergio Llull	15	3	3
SF	44	(Sweden) Jeffery Taylor	0	0	0
Head coach:
(Spanish Basketball Federation) Pablo Laso

=== Semifinal B ===
Efes won the game after Vasilije Micić scored a three-pointer with 0.2 seconds left on the clock, breaking the tie.

19 May 2022	Olympiacos (Hellenic Basketball Federation)	74–**77**	(Turkish Basketball Federation) **Anadolu Efes**	Belgrade, Serbia
18:00 (CEST)	Scoring by quarter: **21**–18, 22–**24**, 20–**24**, 11–11
	Pts: McKissic 12; Rebs: Vezenkov 8 Asts: Sloukas 6 PIR: Martin 15	Boxscore	Pts: Larkin 21; Rebs: Pleiß 7 Asts: Micić 9 PIR: Larkin 21	Arena: Štark Arena; Attendance: 15,472; Referees: (Basketball Federation of Ukraine) Borys Ryzhyk, (Latvian Basketball Association) Oļegs Latiševs, (Lithuanian Basketball Federation) Gytis Vilius

Starters:			Pts	Reb	Ast
PG	0	(United States) Thomas Walkup	5	1	4
SG	2	(Greece) Tyler Dorsey	11	4	1
SF	16	(Greece) Kostas Papanikolaou	10	4	2
PF	14	(Bulgaria) Sasha Vezenkov	5	8	3
C	10	(France) Moustapha Fall	7	5	2
Reserves:					
F	1	(United States) Quincy Acy	DNP		
SG	5	(Greece) Giannoulis Larentzakis	0	0	0
G	11	(Greece) Kostas Sloukas	11	4	6
C	12	(United States) Hassan Martin	11	2	0
PF	15	(Greece) Georgios Printezis	2	0	0
F	17	(France) Livio Jean-Charles	DNP		
G	77	(Azerbaijan) Shaquielle McKissic	12	3	0
Head coach:
(Hellenic Basketball Federation) Georgios Bartzokas

**Olympiacos**	**Anadolu Efes**

Olympiacos	Statistics	A. Efes
17/27 (63%)	2-pt field goals	12/25 (48%)
7/25 (28%)	3-pt field goals	14/34 (41.2%)
19/25 (76%)	Free throws	11/16 (68.8%)
7	Offensive rebounds	10
27	Defensive rebounds	24
34	Total rebounds	34
18	Assists	20
9	Turnovers	8
7	Steals	4
3	Blocks	3
16	Fouls	23

Starters:			Pts	Reb	Ast
PG	0	(Turkey) Shane Larkin	21	0	7
SG	22	(Serbia) Vasilije Micić	15	6	9
SF	23	(United States) James Anderson	0	4	0
PF	18	(France) Adrien Moerman	0	4	0
C	21	(Germany) Tibor Pleiß	8	7	1
Reserves:					
SG	1	(France) Rodrigue Beaubois	0	0	0
PF	2	(United States) Chris Singleton	5	5	1
SG	6	(United States) Elijah Bryant	16	6	0
SG	11	(Turkey) Erten Gazi	DNP		
G	19	(Turkey) Buğrahan Tuncer	DNP		
C	33	(Serbia) Filip Petrušev	DNP		
C	42	(Armenia) Bryant Dunston	12	1	2
Head coach:
(Turkish Basketball Federation) Ergin Ataman

== Third place game ==
21 May 2022	**Barcelona** (Spanish Basketball Federation)	**84**–74	Olympiacos (Hellenic Basketball Federation)	Belgrade, Serbia
16:00 (CEST)	Scoring by quarter: **20**–18, **25**–20, 17–**18**, **22**–18
	Pts: Mirotić 19; Rebs: Calathes 8 Asts: Calathes 13; PIR: Mirotić 27	Boxscore	Pts: Vezenkov 20; Rebs: Vezenkov 11; Asts: Sloukas 7 PIR: Vezenkov 27	Arena: Štark Arena; Attendance: 12,127; Referees: (Basketball Federation of Serbia) Ilija Belošević, (Latvian Basketball Association) Oļegs Latiševs, (Basketball Federation of Slovenia) Damir Javor

Starters:			Pts	Reb	Ast
PG	99	(Greece) Nick Calathes	9	8	13
SG	20	(Argentina) Nicolas Laprovíttola	4	0	1
SF	24	(Slovakia) Kyle Kuric	0	1	1
PF	33	(Spain) Nikola Mirotić	19	4	4
C	5	(Turkey) Sertaç Şanlı	16	3	1
Reserves:					
C	0	(Uganda) Brandon Davies	10	5	2
SF	1	(Australia) Dante Exum	3	1	1
PF	10	(Latvia) Rolands Šmits	DNP		
F	14	(United States) Nigel Hayes	0	3	0
SF	21	(Spain) Álex Abrines	8	2	0
SG	22	(United States) Cory Higgins	11	2	0
PG	31	(Lithuania) Rokas Jokubaitis	4	2	0
Head coach:
(Lithuanian Basketball Federation) Šarūnas Jasikevičius

**Barcelona**	**Olympiacos**

Barcelona	Statistics	Olympiacos
27/40 (67.5%)	2-pt field goals	19/34 (55.9%)
8/21 (38.1%)	3-pt field goals	5/17 (29.4%)
6/13 (46.2%)	Free throws	21/27 (77.8%)
10	Offensive rebounds	5
25	Defensive rebounds	20
35	Total rebounds	25
23	Assists	18
16	Turnovers	14
9	Steals	13
1	Blocks	1
25	Fouls	21

Starters:			Pts	Reb	Ast
PG	0	(United States) Thomas Walkup	8	2	1
SG	2	(Greece) Tyler Dorsey	10	2	0
SF	16	(Greece) Kostas Papanikolaou	0	1	0
PF	14	(Bulgaria) Sasha Vezenkov	20	11	0
C	10	(France) Moustapha Fall	2	3	1
Reserves:					
G	4	(Greece) Michalis Lountzis	0	1	0
SG	5	(Greece) Giannoulis Larentzakis	5	1	3
G	11	(Greece) Kostas Sloukas	14	1	7
C	12	(United States) Hassan Martin	2	0	0
PF	15	(Greece) Georgios Printezis	0	0	1
F	17	(France) Livio Jean-Charles	2	1	2
G	77	(Azerbaijan) Shaquielle McKissic	11	1	3
Head coach:
(Hellenic Basketball Federation) Georgios Bartzokas

== Championship game ==
21 May 2022	Real Madrid (Spanish Basketball Federation)	57–**58**	(Turkish Basketball Federation) **Anadolu Efes**	Belgrade, Serbia
19:00 (CEST)	Scoring by quarter: **15**–14, **19**–15, 8–**11**, 15–**18**
	Pts: Tavares 14; Rebs: Tavares 11; Asts: Llull 6 PIR: Tavares 20	Boxscore	Pts: Micic 23; Rebs: Bryant 8 Asts: Larkin 4 PIR: Pleiss 24	Arena: Štark Arena; Attendance: 15,000; Referees: (Italian Basketball Federation) Luigi Lamonica, (Basketball Federation of Ukraine) Borys Ryzhyk, (Lithuanian Basketball Federation) Gytis Vilius

Starters:			Pts	Reb	Ast
PG	6	(Spain) Alberto Abalde	2	3	0
SG	8	(Hungary) Ádám Hanga	5	3	1
SF	14	(Argentina) Gabriel Deck	5	3	0
PF	28	(France) Guerschon Yabusele	3	3	0
C	22	(Cape Verde) Edy Tavares	14	11	1
Reserves:					
SG	1	(France) Fabien Causeur	3	2	1
PG	2	(Spain) Juan Núñez	DNP		
PF	3	(Slovenia) Anthony Randolph	6	2	0
SG	5	(Spain) Rudy Fernández	2	2	2
C	17	(France) Vincent Poirier	5	4	2
G	23	(Spain) Sergio Llull	9	0	6
SF	44	(Sweden) Jeffery Taylor	3	2	1
Head coach:
(Spanish Basketball Federation) Pablo Laso

**Real Madrid**	**Anadolu Efes**

Real Madrid	Statistics	A. Efes
14/34 (41.2%)	2-pt field goals	17/32 (53.1%)
6/33 (18.2%)	3-pt field goals	6/24 (25%)
11/17 (64.7%)	Free throws	6/9 (66.7%)
18	Offensive rebounds	11
22	Defensive rebounds	33
40	Total rebounds	44
14	Assists	7
6	Turnovers	12
6	Steals	5
3	Blocks	3
20	Fouls	16

2021–22 EuroLeague champions

**Anadolu Efes**
(2nd title)

Starters:			Pts	Reb	Ast
PG	0	(Turkey) Shane Larkin	10	6	4
SG	22	(Serbia) Vasilije Micić	23	2	2
SF	23	(United States) James Anderson	0	1	0
PF	18	(France) Adrien Moerman	0	6	0
C	21	(Germany) Tibor Pleiß	19	7	0
Reserves:					
SG	1	(France) Rodrigue Beaubois	0	1	0
PF	2	(United States) Chris Singleton	4	7	0
SG	6	(United States) Elijah Bryant	0	8	1
SG	11	(Turkey) Erten Gazi	DNP		
G	19	(Turkey) Buğrahan Tuncer	DNP		
C	33	(Serbia) Filip Petrušev	DNP		
C	42	(Armenia) Bryant Dunston	2	1	0
Head coach:
(Turkish Basketball Federation) Ergin Ataman

- Team captains (C): (Spain) Sergio Llull (Real Madrid) and (Armenia) Bryant Dunston (Anadolu Efes) (Note: Dunston was the designated captain as Doğuş Balbay was the club's captain.)
