= Obrad Belošević =

Serbian basketball referee

Personal information
- Born: 28 April 1928 Leskovac, Kingdom of Serbs, Croats and Slovenes
- Died: 20 January 1986 (aged 57) Belgrade, SFR Yugoslavia
- Position: Referee
- Officiating career: 1951–1976

Career highlights
- FIBA Silver Whistle Award (1977)
- FIBA Hall of Fame

Obrad Belošević (Serbian Cyrillic: Обрад Белошевић; 28 April 1928 – 20 January 1986) was a Serbian basketball referee.

== Refereeing career ==
Belošević refereed over 300 games of the Yugoslav League from 1951 to 1976. Other notable events he refereed in include the 1968 Summer Olympics, 1970 FIBA World Championship, 1974 FIBA World Championship, two European Champions Cup final games (1969 and 1970) and a FIBA Korać Cup final. He was enshrined in the FIBA Hall of Fame in 2007.

== Personal life ==
Belošević's son, Ilija (born 1972), is considered one of the best European basketball referees.
