= Mehdi Difallah =

French basketball referee (born 1984)

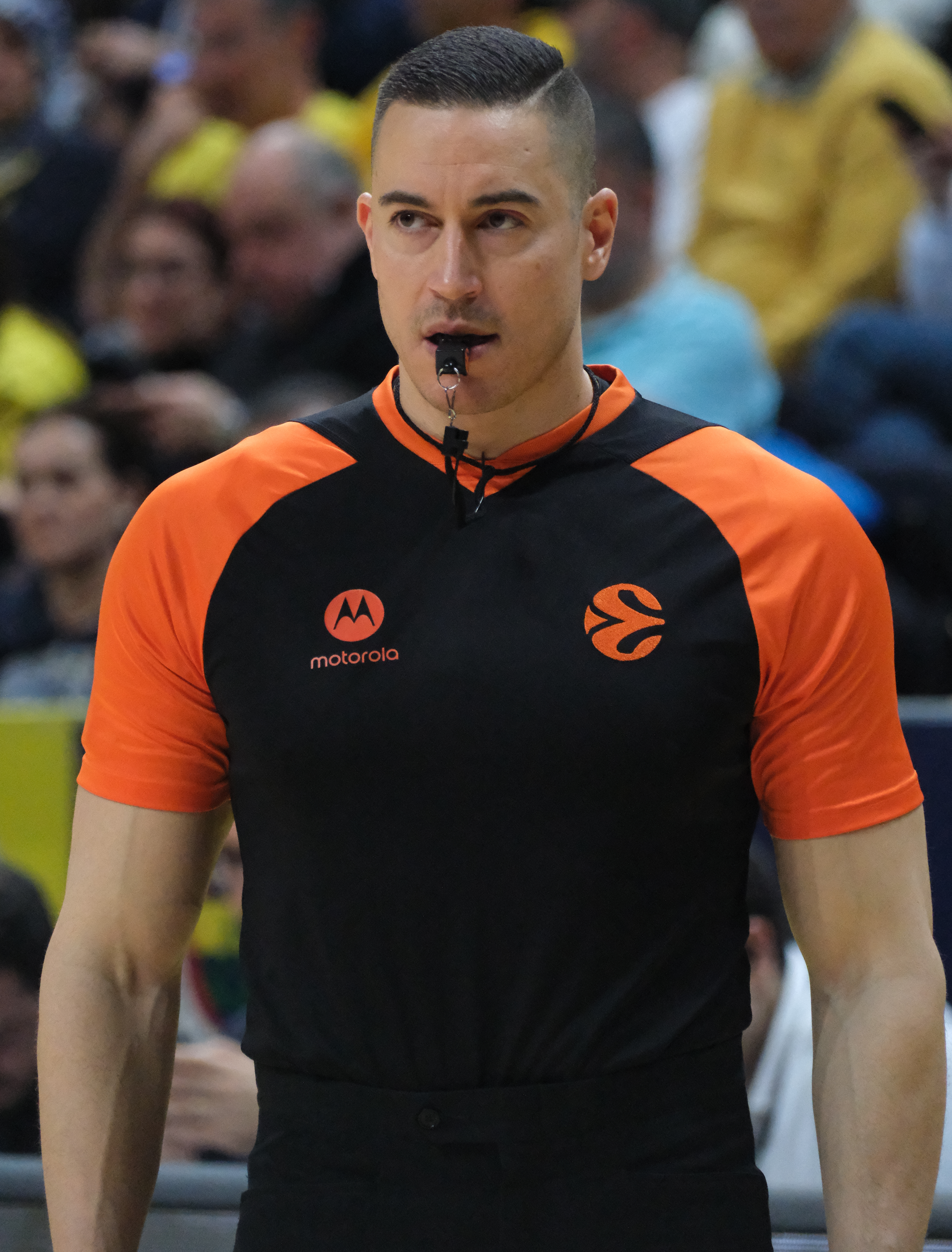
- Difallah in 2025

Personal information
- Born: June 15, 1984 (age 42) France

Career information
- Position: Referee
- Officiating career: 2011–present

Career highlights
- Appointed FIBA referee (2014–present); EuroLeague referee (2017–present)

Mehdi Difallah (born 15 June 1984) is a French professional basketball referee,. who began officiating in France’s top domestic league, the LNB Pro A, in 2011 and was promoted to the FIBA international referees list in 2014. In 2017, he joined the EuroLeague officiating roster, and has since officiated numerous high-profile games.

== Career ==
Difallah made his professional refereeing debut in the LNB Pro A during the 2011–12 season. His consistent performances led to his nomination to the FIBA panel in 2014, allowing him to officiate in international tournaments, including FIBA World Cup qualifiers and youth championships.

In 2017, he was added to the EuroLeague referee pool, and he has since officiated several playoff and Final Four fixtures. In the summer of 2023, he has also officiated some NBA Summer League games, held in the USA.

In 2024, Difallah was selected among eight referees for the 2024 EuroLeague Final Four, held in Berlin and officiated in the Final Game between Real Madrid and Panathinaikos.

In 2025, he was again selected for the Euroleague Final Four in Abu Dhabi, marking his sixth straight appearance. In addition, Difallah officiated the 2025 EuroLeague semifinal game, between Fenerbahçe and Panathinaikos, bridging his personal milestones with those of his French referee predecessors like Yvan Mainini and Pascal Dorizon.

== Recognition ==
In overall, Difallah has been named Best Referee (Betclic ÉLITE) in 2018, 2022, and again for the 2024–25 season.

In the 2024–25 season saw him reclaim that prestigious award, showcasing a remarkable French record including 10 Pro A finals since 2014, 3 French Cup finals, and 3 LNB All-Star Game appearances.
