= Isaiah Taylor =

American basketball player (born 1994)

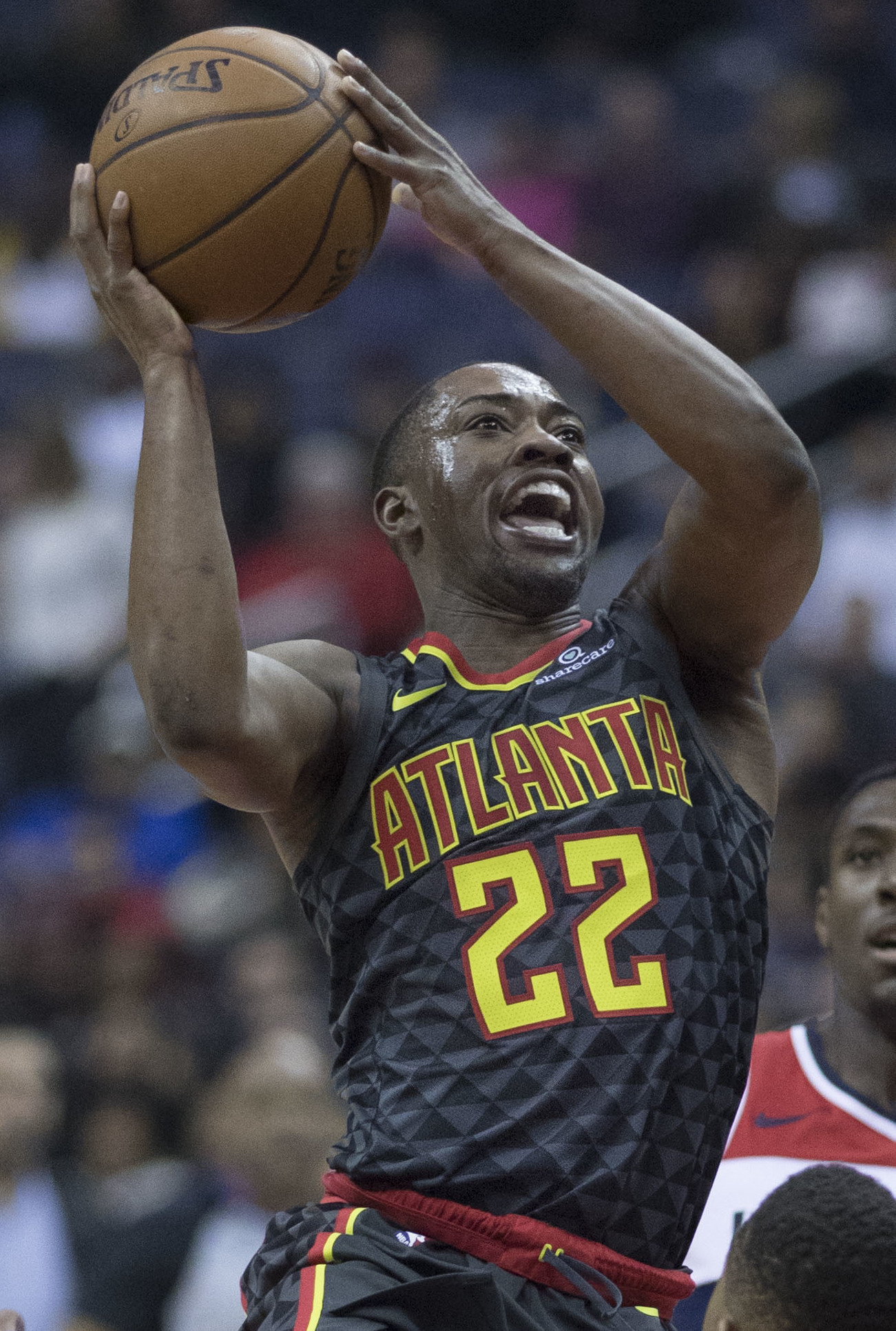
- Taylor with the Atlanta Hawks in 2017

Free agent
- Position: Point guard

Personal information
- Born: July 11, 1994 (age 32) Hayward, California, U.S.
- Listed height: 6 ft 2 in (1.88 m)
- Listed weight: 170 lb (77 kg)

Career information
- High school: The Village School (Houston, Texas)
- College: Texas (2013–2016)
- NBA draft: 2016: undrafted
- Playing career: 2016–present

Career history
- 2016–2017: Rio Grande Valley Vipers
- 2017: Houston Rockets
- 2017–2018: Atlanta Hawks
- 2018: →Erie BayHawks
- 2019–2020: Rio Grande Valley Vipers
- 2020–2021: Maccabi Rishon LeZion
- 2021–2022: Murcia
- 2022–2023: Anadolu Efes
- 2023: Žalgiris Kaunas
- 2023–2024: Shanxi Loongs
- 2024–2025: Dubai Basketball

Career highlights
- Lithuanian League champion (2023); Lithuanian League Finals MVP (2023); Lithuanian Cup winner (2023); Spanish League Second Team (2022); NBA D-League All-Rookie Team (2017); First-team All-Big 12 (2016); Third-team All-Big 12 (2015); Big 12 All-Rookie Team (2014)
- Stats at NBA.com
- Stats at Basketball Reference

Isaiah Shaquille Taylor (born July 11, 1994) is an American professional basketball player who last played for Dubai Basketball of the ABA League. He has previously played in the National Basketball Association (NBA) for the Houston Rockets and Atlanta Hawks, and three seasons of college basketball for the Texas Longhorns.

== High school career ==
Taylor and his parents, Loretta Perkins and Kenneth Taylor, moved to Houston, Texas prior to his junior year in high school. As a junior at The Village School, he averaged 15.6 points and 12.0 assists per game and led his team to a 29–4 record. He led the team in scoring as a senior with 17.6 points per game to go along with 10.0 assists and 6.0 steals per game. Taylor shot 62.2 percent from the field in leading the Vikings to a 23–5 record. ESPN rated him the 13th-best prospect in Texas.

College recruiting
Name	Hometown	School	Height	Weight	Commit date
Isaiah Taylor; G	Houston, TX	The Village	6 ft 2 in (1.88 m)	175 lb (79 kg)	Jan 4, 2013
Isaiah Taylor; G	Recruit ratings: Scout: Rivals: (78)				

== College career ==
Taylor was named to the Big 12 All-Newcomer Team and was an All-Big 12 Honorable Mention as a freshman. He finished second on the team in scoring with 12.7 points per game and led the Longhorns in minutes played (30.1 per game) and assists (4.0 per game). He earned Big 12 Rookie of the Week honors on February 3, 2014, after scoring 23 points in a home victory over Kansas. In the Round of 32 of the 2014 NCAA tournament, Taylor scored 22 points on 8-for-22 shooting in a loss to Michigan.

As a sophomore, Taylor posted averages of 13.1 points and 4.6 assists per game in 24 games, shooting 28 percent from behind the 3-point arc and 52 percent on layups. He was named to the All-Big 12 Third Team. He missed several games after sustaining a wrist injury against Iowa in the 2K Classic. With Taylor out of the lineup, Texas struggled, even when he made a return to the team. After the season, Taylor announced he would return for his junior campaign, forgoing a possible second round pick in the 2015 NBA draft. CBSSports.com's Sam Vecenie wrote that new Texas coach Shaka Smart's "system will accentuate Taylor's quickness and athleticism quite well."

== Professional career ==
=== Houston Rockets and Rio Grande Valley Vipers (2016–2017) ===
After going undrafted in the 2016 NBA draft, Taylor joined the Houston Rockets for the 2016 NBA Summer League. He signed with the Rockets on September 23, 2016, but was waived on October 16, 2016, after appearing in three preseason games. On October 31, 2016, he was acquired by the Rio Grande Valley Vipers of the NBA Development League as an affiliate player of the Rockets. Due to a groin injury, Taylor missed a large portion of the Vipers' 2016–17 campaign. In 12 games with seven starts, Taylor averaged a team-high 21.1 points along with 6.1 assists while shooting 49.7% from the floor, 41.3% from three-point range and 79.5% from the free throw line.

On February 27, 2017, Taylor signed a three-year, non-guaranteed contract with the Houston Rockets. He was immediately assigned back down to the Vipers. On April 2, 2017, he was recalled from the D-League and made his NBA debut that night in the Rockets' 123–116 win over the Phoenix Suns. On October 13, 2017, Taylor was waived by the Rockets.

=== Atlanta Hawks (2017–2018) ===
On October 17, 2017, Taylor signed with the Atlanta Hawks. On June 30, 2018, he was waived by the Hawks. On August 10, 2018, Taylor signed with the Cleveland Cavaliers. He was waived by Cleveland on October 13, 2018.

=== Toronto Raptors (2019) ===
On September 19, 2019, Taylor signed a partially guaranteed deal with the Toronto Raptors. On October 21, 2019, Taylor was waived by the Raptors.

=== Second stint with Rio Grande Valley Vipers (2019–2020) ===
On December 31, 2019, the Rio Grande Valley Vipers announced that they had claimed Taylor off waivers. On January 12, 2020, Taylor registered 24 points, seven assists, three rebounds and one steal in a win over the South Bay Lakers. Taylor averaged 16.3 points, 3.7 rebounds, 5.6 assists, and 1.1 steals per game while shooting 52 percent from the field.

=== Maccabi Rishon LeZion (2020–2021) ===
On September 7, 2020, Taylor signed with Maccabi Rishon LeZion of the Israeli Premier League.

=== UCAM Murcia (2021–2022) ===
On February 22, 2021, Taylor signed with UCAM Murcia of the Spanish Liga ACB.

=== Anadolu Efes (2022) ===
On November 1, 2022, he signed with Anadolu Efes of the Turkish Basketbol Süper Ligi (BSL). On January 1, 2023, his contract option was not picked up by the EuroLeague champions.

=== Žalgiris Kaunas (2023) ===
On January 6, 2023, Taylor signed with Žalgiris Kaunas of the Lithuanian Basketball League (LKL) for the rest of the 2022–23 season, replacing the injured Keenan Evans. He helped Žalgiris win the LKL championship, winning the MVP of the finals in the process, and helped Žalgiris reach the EuroLeague playoffs. On June 27, 2023, he parted ways with the club.

=== Shanxi Loongs (2023–2024) ===
On September 13, 2023, Taylor signed with Shanxi Loongs of the Chinese Basketball Association (CBA).

== Career statistics ==
Legend
GP	Games played	GS	Games started	MPG	Minutes per game
FG%	Field-goal percentage	3P%	3-point field-goal percentage	FT%	Free-throw percentage
RPG	Rebounds per game	APG	Assists per game	SPG	Steals per game
BPG	Blocks per game	PPG	Points per game	PIR	Performance index rating
**Bold**	Career high

=== NBA ===
==== Regular season ====
Year	Team	GP	GS	MPG	FG%	3P%	FT%	RPG	APG	SPG	BPG	PPG
2016–17	Houston	4	0	13.0	.143	.000	.500	.8	.8	.3	**.3**	.8
2017–18	Atlanta	**67**	**9**	**17.4**	**.418**	**.250**	**.702**	**1.4**	**3.1**	**.5**	.1	**6.6**
Career		71	9	17.2	.413	.244	.699	1.4	2.9	.5	.2	3.7

==== Playoffs ====
Year	Team	GP	GS	MPG	FG%	3P%	FT%	RPG	APG	SPG	BPG	PPG
2017	Houston	3	0	3.3	.000	.000	–	.7	.3	.0	.0	.0
Career		3	0	3.3	.000	.000	–	.7	.3	.0	.0	.0

=== EuroLeague ===
Year	Team	GP	GS	MPG	FG%	3P%	FT%	RPG	APG	SPG	BPG	PPG	PIR
2022–23	Anadolu Efes	11	0	10.3	.375	.286	**1.000**	.5	.5	**.5**	.0	2.6	1.6
2022–23	Žalgiris	**15**	**9**	**17.1**	**.495**	**.533**	.630	**1.1**	**2.4**	**.5**	.0	**7.9**	**5.7**
Career		26	9	14.2	.471	.455	.722	.8	1.6	.5	.0	5.7	4.0
