= Sertaç Şanlı =

Turkish basketball player (born 1991)

- Şanlı with Fenerbahçe in 2026

No. 5 – Fenerbahçe
- Position: Center
- League: BSL; EuroLeague

Personal information
- Born: 5 August 1991 (age 35) Edirne, Turkey
- Listed height: 2.14 m (7 ft 0 in)
- Listed weight: 115 kg (254 lb)

Career information
- NBA draft: 2013: undrafted
- Playing career: 2008–present

Career history
- 2008–2010: Genç Telekom
- 2010–2015: Galatasaray
- 2011: →Tofaş Bursa
- 2013–2014: →Gaziantep
- 2014–2015: →Uşak Sportif
- 2015–2016: Trabzonspor
- 2016–2018: Beşiktaş
- 2018–2021: Anadolu Efes
- 2021–2023: FC Barcelona
- 2023–2025: Fenerbahçe
- 2025–2026: Dubai Basketball
- 2026: Beşiktaş
- 2026–present: Fenerbahçe

Career highlights
- 2× EuroLeague champion (2021, 2025); 4× Turkish League champion (2019, 2021, 2024, 2025); 2× Turkish Cup winner (2024, 2025); 3× Turkish Super Cup winner (2018, 2019, 2026); Liga ACB champion (2023); Spanish Cup winner (2022)
Medals
Men's basketball
Representing Turkey
EuroBasket
Silver medal – second place	2025 Cyprus–Finland–Poland–Latvia

Sertaç Şanlı (Turkish pronunciation: [ˈʃanɫɯ]; born 5 August 1991) is a Turkish professional basketball player for Fenerbahçe of the Turkish Basketbol Süper Ligi (BSL) and the EuroLeague. He mainly plays at the center position, and is known for his three-point shooting ability from pick and pops.

== Professional career ==
He made his professional debut in the TB2L with Genç Telekom during the 2008-09 season.

In the summer of 2010, he signed a five year contract with Galatasaray.

On 18 October 2011, Sertaç transferred to Tofaş Bursa on a one-year loan deal till end of the 2011-12 season. He played 5 league games for Tofaş Bursa.

He also loaned to Royal Halı Gaziantep for 2013–2014 season and loaned to Uşak Sportif for 2014–2015 seasons.

On 13 July 2015, he signed one year deal with Trabzonspor.

On 8 August 2016, he signed contract with Beşiktaş.

=== Anadolu Efes (2018–2021) ===
After successful two seasons with Beşiktaş, he signed with Anadolu Efes on 13 June 2018. He averaged 6.3 points and 3.1 rebounds per game in the 2018-19 season, 7.8 points and 4.7 rebounds per game in the 2019-20 season. On July 14, 2020, he re-signed with the team. He averaged 8.7 points and 3.6 rebounds per game in the 2020-21 season.

On May 30, 2021, Şanlı helped Anadolu Efes to their first EuroLeague championship in Cologne. He helped the team defeat CSKA Moscow in the semi-final with 19 points, 8 rebounds, 1 block and FC Barcelona in the final with 12 points, 2 rebounds, 1 block performances.

=== Barcelona (2021–2023) ===
On July 1, 2021, Şanlı signed with FC Barcelona of the Spanish Liga ACB and the EuroLeague. On July 6, 2023, Şanlı amicably parted ways with the Catalan powerhouse.

=== Fenerbahçe (2023–2025) ===
On July 13, 2023, Şanlı signed a contract with Fenerbahçe of Basketbol Süper Ligi and the EuroLeague until the end of the 2024–25 season.

On May 25, 2025, Şanlı helped Fenerbahçe to their second EuroLeague championship in Abu Dhabi. He helped the team defeat the defending champions Panathinaikos in the semi-final, and Monaco in the final. With this championship, he became the first Turkish basketball player to win the Euroleague title with both Turkish powerhouses, his first title being the 2021 title with Anadolu Efes.

On September 23, 2025, Fenerbahçe parted ways with Sertaç Şanlı.

=== Dubai Basketball (2025–2026) ===
On September 28, 2025, he signed with Dubai Basketball of the ABA League.

=== Return to Beşiktaş (2026) ===
On January 13, 2026, he signed with Beşiktaş Gain of the Turkish Basketbol Süper Ligi (BSL) for a second stint.

=== Second stint with Fenerbahçe (2026–present) ===
On July 14, 2026, he signed with Fenerbahçe of the Turkish Basketbol Süper Ligi (BSL) for a second stint.

== National team career ==
Şanlı represented the Turkish national team at the EuroBasket 2017, 2019 FIBA World Cup and the EuroBasket 2025.

== Career statistics ==
Legend
GP	Games played	GS	Games started	MPG	Minutes per game
FG%	Field-goal percentage	3P%	3-point field-goal percentage	FT%	Free-throw percentage
RPG	Rebounds per game	APG	Assists per game	SPG	Steals per game
BPG	Blocks per game	PPG	Points per game	PIR	Performance index rating
**Bold**	Career high	†	Won a EuroLeague championship

=== EuroLeague ===
Year	Team	GP	GS	MPG	FG%	3P%	FT%	RPG	APG	SPG	BPG	PPG	PIR
2011–12	Galatasaray	3	0	4.7	.600	—	—	.3	—	—	—	2.0	0.0
2018–19	Anadolu Efes	9	0	3.6	**.778**	.000	.800	.4	—	—	—	2.0	1.8
2019–20	Anadolu Efes	21	1	11.7	.648	.286	.788	2.2	.3	.2	.4	7.0	6.2
2020–21†	Anadolu Efes	34	19	14.2	.582	.349	.815	2.2	.6	**.4**	**.5**	**7.8**	**7.3**
2021–22	Barcelona	32	**24**	15.1	.473	.357	.775	**3.3**	.7	.3	.4	6.5	5.4
2022–23	Barcelona	**36**	20	**17.2**	.455	.265	**.857**	3.1	**1.0**	.3	**.5**	6.2	5.1
2023–24	Fenerbahçe	35	16	12.2	.457	.351	.783	2.0	.5	.1	.3	4.7	3.3
2024–25†	Fenerbahçe	35	17	13.1	.618	**.361**	.780	2.4	.7	**.4**	.1	5.5	5.3
2025-26	Dubai Basketball	7	0	7.8	.667	.667	1.000	1.0	.0	.0	.4	2.4	1.4
2026–27	Fenerbahçe	9	7	11.2	.433	.313	.750	1.8	.2	.3	.1	3.8	1.9
Career		219	104	13.2	.511	.330	.803	2.4	.6	.3	.4	5.8	4.9

=== EuroCup ===
Year	Team	GP	GS	MPG	FG%	3P%	FT%	RPG	APG	SPG	BPG	PPG	PIR
2010–11	Galatasaray	2	0	**18.5**	**.625**	—	.600	4.5	**.5**	**1.0**	—	6.5	8.5
2012–13	Galatasaray	2	1	15.5	.500	.333	**1.000**	**6.5**	—	—	**1.0**	**9.0**	**14.5**
2015–16	Trabzonspor	**14**	**4**	8.9	.537	—	.917	2.4	.2	.1	.3	3.9	3.2
2025-26	Beşiktaş	5	0	5.5	.500	**.500**	**1.000**	1.4	.2	.0	.4	1.4	1.8
Career		23	5	9.6	.537	.400	.864	2.7	.2	.2	.3	4.0	4.3

=== Basketball Champions League ===
Year	Team	GP	GS	MPG	FG%	3P%	FT%	RPG	APG	SPG	BPG	PPG
2016–17	Beşiktaş	13	0	10.8	.550	—	**.870**	2.1	.6	**.4**	.1	4.9
2017–18	Beşiktaş	**16**	**5**	**17.5**	**.578**	.000	.765	**4.0**	**.8**	**.4**	**.8**	**8.9**
Career		29	5	14.5	.569	.000	.797	3.1	.7	.4	.5	7.1

=== FIBA EuroChallenge ===
Year	Team	GP	GS	MPG	FG%	3P%	FT%	RPG	APG	SPG	BPG	PPG
2013–14	Gaziantep	11	6	8.6	.500	.000	.583	2.9	**.1**	—	.2	3.9
2014–15	Uşak Sportif	**12**	**8**	**14.1**	**.553**	—	**.588**	**4.2**	**.1**	**.2**	**.3**	**4.3**
Career		23	14	11.5	.527	.000	.586	3.6	.1	.1	.3	4.1

=== Domestic leagues ===
†	Denotes seasons in which Şanlı won the domestic league

Year	Team	League	GP	MPG	FG%	3P%	FT%	RPG	APG	SPG	BPG	PPG
2010–11	(Turkey) Darüşşafaka	TB2L	10	24.0	.463	.200	.692	8.7	.5	.6	1.2	9.3
2010–11	(Turkey) Galatasaray	TBL	16	7.6	.515	—	.800	1.1	.3	.2	.3	2.6
2011–12	(Turkey) Tofaş	TBL	5	10.5	.292	.400	1.000	2.2	—	.4	.2	3.4
2011–12	(Turkey) Galatasaray	TBL	4	6.2	.500	—	1.000	3.7	—	.2	—	3.7
2012–13	(Turkey) Galatasaray	TBL	15	6.6	.556	.000	.500	2.3	.3	.2	.3	2.9
2013–14	(Turkey) Gaziantep	TBL	21	8.9	.456	.000	.889	2.4	.4	—	.3	3.7
2014–15	(Turkey) Uşak Sportif	TBL	30	13.1	.573	.286	.750	3.4	.4	.1	.3	5.9
2015–16	(Turkey) Trabzonspor	TBSL	23	9.9	.562	.000	.706	2.9	.3	.1	.3	4.6
2016–17	(Turkey) Beşiktaş	TBSL	38	11.5	.564	.400	.800	3.2	.4	.4	.3	4.6
2017–18	(Turkey) Beşiktaş	TBSL	31	18.5	.552	.200	.831	3.7	1.0	.5	1.0	9.2
2018–19 †	(Turkey) Anadolu Efes	TBSL	39	14.3	.583	.389	.769	3.1	.4	.3	.6	6.3
2019–20	(Turkey) Anadolu Efes	TBSL	23	16.2	.612	.643	.815	4.7	.6	.5	.8	7.8
2020–21 †	(Turkey) Anadolu Efes	TBSL	34	16.2	.575	.465	.813	3.6	.8	.4	.6	8.7
2021–22 †	(Spain) Barcelona	ACB	35	14.5	.512	.433	.735	3.6	.5	.2	.5	6.7
2022–23	(Spain) Barcelona	ACB	38	15.9	.543	.400	.806	3.4	.7	.4	.3	7.3
2023–24 †	(Turkey) Fenerbahçe	TBSL	37	18.1	.606	.453	.688	4.1	1.1	.4	.6	9.1
2024–25 †	(Turkey) Fenerbahçe	TBSL	29	18.1	.667	.377	.867	4.2	1.0	.2	.4	8.3

== Awards and accomplishments ==
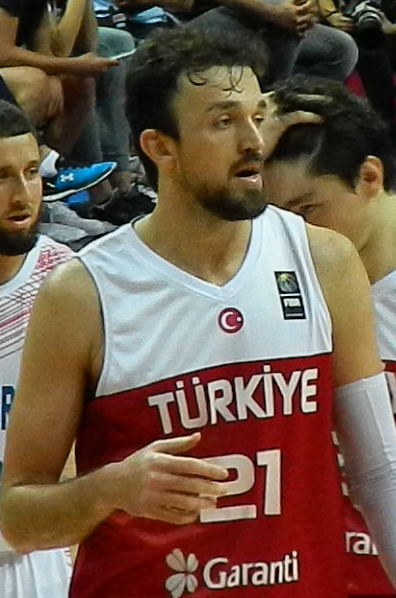
Sertaç Şanlı in 2017

(Turkey) Anadolu Efes

- EuroLeague: (2021)
- 2× Turkish Super League: (2019, 2021)
- 2× Turkish Presidential Cup: (2018, 2019)

(Spain) Barcelona

- Spanish ACB League: (2023)
- Copa del Rey de Baloncesto: (2022)

(Turkey) Fenerbahçe

- EuroLeague: (2025)
- Turkish Super League: (2024, 2025)
- Turkish Cup: (2024, 2025)
