= Ilija Belošević =

Serbian basketball referee (born 1972)

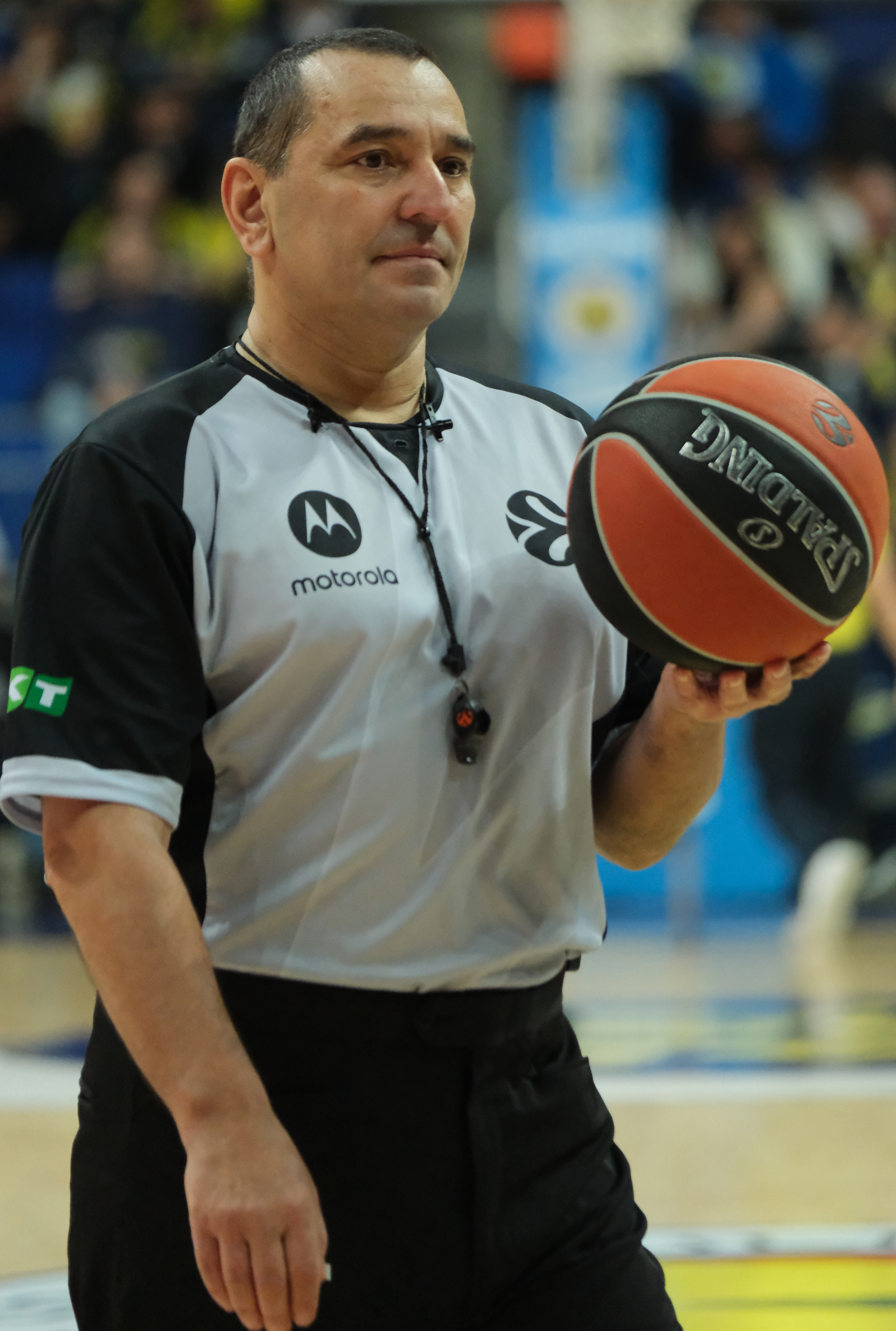
- Belošević in 2026

Personal information
- Born: 13 April 1972 (age 54) Belgrade, SR Serbia, SFR Yugoslavia
- Position: Referee
- Officiating career: 1987–present

Ilija Belošević (Serbian Cyrillic: Илија Белошевић; born 13 April 1972) is a Serbian basketball referee. He is considered one of the most experienced referees in Europe and has officiated at the highest levels of the game including 3x Summer Olympics (2008, 2012, 2016), 3x FIBA World Cups (2006, 2010, 2014), 7x Eurobaskets (2001, 2003, 2007, 2009, 2011, 2013, 2015), 11 Euroleague Final Fours (2003, 2004, 2006, 2007, 2009, 2013, 2014, 2015, 2022, 2024, 2025) and 6 Euroleague finals games (2004, 2006, 2007, 2013, 2015, 2024)

== Refereeing career ==
Belošević has been a referee since 1987 and an international referee since 1997. At the end of the 2020–21 EuroLeague season, he was the EuroLeague's all-time leader in games refereed (387).

== Personal life ==
Belošević's father Obrad was a referee who was inducted into the FIBA Hall of Fame.
