= BC Žalgiris =

Basketball team in Kaunas, Lithuania

Žalgiris Kaunas
- 2026–27 BC Žalgiris season
- Nickname: Žaliai balti (The Green-Whites)
- Leagues: Lithuanian Basketball League; EuroLeague
- Founded: 1944; 82 years ago
- Arena: Žalgiris Arena
- Capacity: 15,415
- Location: Kaunas, Lithuania
- Team colors: Dartmouth green, white
- President: Paulius Jankūnas
- Team manager: Mindaugas Kvedaras
- Head coach: Tomas Masiulis
- Team captain: Edgaras Ulanovas
- Ownership: Paulius Motiejūnas (55%); Tesonet (NordVPN) (45%)
- Affiliation: Reserve team
- Championships: 1 EuroLeague; 1 Saporta Cup; 1 Intercontinental Cup; 5 Soviet Union Leagues; 1 Soviet Union Cup; 1 North European League; 26 Lithuanian Leagues; 9 King Mindaugas Cups; 5 Lithuanian Cups; 5 Baltic Leagues; 9 Lithuanian SSR Championships
- Retired numbers: 3 (5, 11, 13)
- Website: zalgiris.lt
Home	Away

Basketball Club Žalgiris (Lithuanian: Krepšinio klubas Žalgiris), commonly known as BC Žalgiris, is a Lithuanian professional basketball team based in Kaunas, Lithuania. The team competes domestically in the Lithuanian Basketball League (Lietuvos krepšinio lyga) and internationally in the EuroLeague as a long-term licensed team. Since the 2011–12 season, Žalgiris has played its home games at Žalgiris Arena in the New Town district of Kaunas.

Žalgiris is the most decorated basketball club in Lithuania, having won 26 domestic championships (most recently in 2025–26), five Soviet Union National League championships (the second most behind CSKA Moscow), and one EuroLeague championship. Many Lithuanian basketball players who went on to international renown have played for Žalgiris, including Arvydas Sabonis, Modestas Paulauskas, and Šarūnas Jasikevičius. Eight of the fifteen Lithuanian basketball players to play in the National Basketball Association have played for Žalgiris or were part of the Žalgiris youth program at one point in their careers: Arvydas Sabonis, Šarūnas Jasikevičius, Donatas Motiejūnas, Mindaugas Kuzminskas, Darius Songaila, Martynas Andriuškevičius, Arnoldas Kulboka, and Ignas Brazdeikis.

The club's name commemorates the Polish–Lithuanian–Teutonic War's Battle of Žalgiris, also known as the Battle of Grunwald, in which the joint forces of the Grand Duchy of Lithuania and the Kingdom of Poland defeated the Teutonic Order in one of medieval Europe's largest battles. Žalgiris translates to "green wood" in Lithuanian.

== History ==
=== 1944–1970: Early success ===
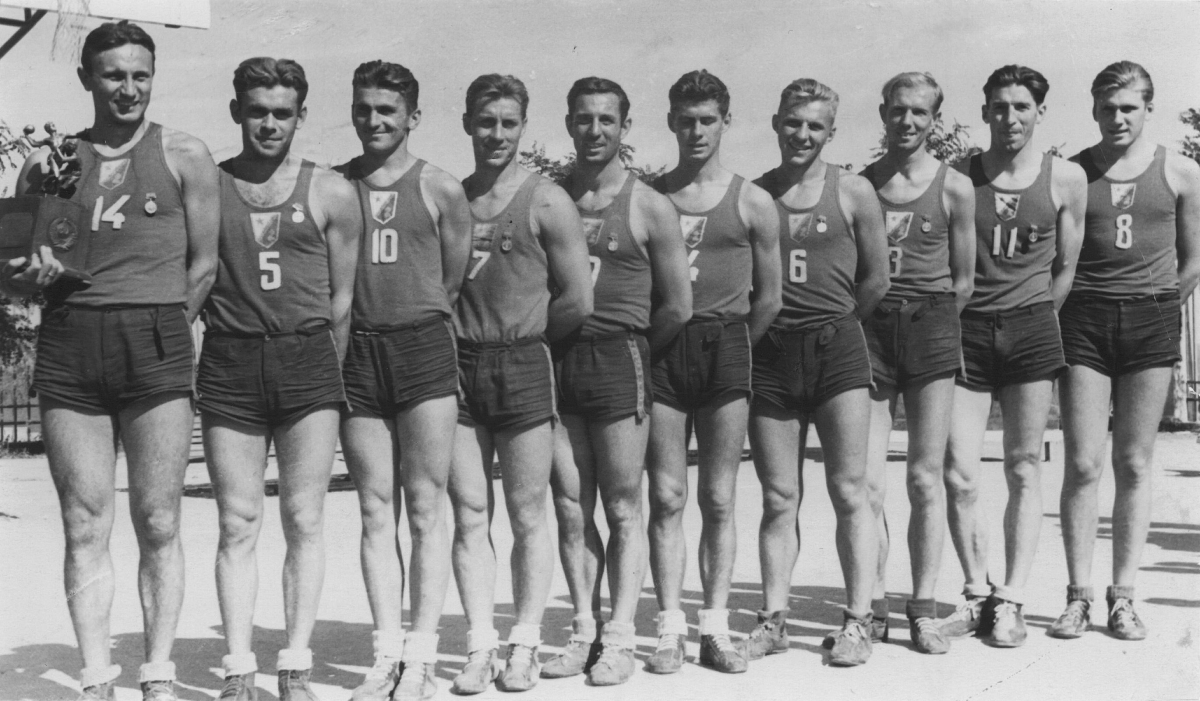
BC Žalgiris, the champions of the USSR Premier League in 1951

BC Žalgiris was formed in 1944. In 1944 they played against the German basketball team. The team was named ASK from 1945 to 1947, after which it was named SKIF from 1947 to 1949. Beginning in 1950, the team was renamed Žalgiris. The team quickly rose to prominence, winning the Soviet Union's top-tier USSR Premier Basketball League twice, in 1947 and 1951, as well as multiple domestic Lithuanian championships. In the following years, the team won two silver medals in the USSR league in 1949 and 1952 and four bronze medals from 1953 to 1956. Žalgiris also won the USSR Basketball Cup in 1953. The team at the time was led by Stepas Butautas, Vytautas Kulakauskas, Justinas Lagunavičius, and Kazimieras Petkevičius, and later by Stasys Stonkus and Algirdas Lauritėnas. In the 1960s, the team's play declined, and many new young players joined the team, such as Modestas Paulauskas, Romualdas Venzbergas, Henrikas Giedraitis, Algirdas Linkevičius, and Sergejus Jovaiša.

=== 1970–1990: Among the elite in the USSR ===
Žalgiris became the dominant club in the Soviet Union and Europe when they added Valdemaras Chomičius and Rimas Kurtinaitis to their roster, along with coach Vladas Garastas. The team won bronze medals in the Soviet Union championship in 1971, 1973, and 1978. In 1980, Žalgiris debuted in the 1980–81 FIBA European Cup Winners' Cup. Their biggest addition, though, was 17-year-old Arvydas Sabonis, who debuted with the club in 1981 at 209 centimeters (82 in) and grew another 12 centimeters (4.7 in) over the next couple of years. Sabonis soon became known for his versatility, being able to play defence, assist his teammates, shoot three-pointers, and dominate inside the paint.

From 1985 to 1987, Žalgiris won three consecutive Soviet Union National League championships, beating CSKA Moscow (English: Central Sports Club of Army) in the finals in all three years. In 1985, they reached the Saporta Cup final but lost to FC Barcelona. Despite the loss, Žalgiris participated in the EuroLeague the next year as the Soviet Union champions, reaching the finals and losing to rival KK Cibona. Žalgiris was emerging as one of the top clubs in Europe at the time.

In the mid-1980s, the rivalry between Žalgiris Kaunas and CSKA Moscow served as a major inspiration for the Lithuanian national revival, especially when they played in Kaunas Sports Hall. It contributed to the emergence of the Sąjūdis national movement and the re-establishment of state independence. In 1987, however, Žalgiris suffered a setback when star player Sabonis suffered a torn Achilles tendon. Three months later, he tore it again, causing him to miss most of the 1987–88 season. That season, Žalgiris won a silver medal, losing to CSKA Moscow in the Soviet League finals. The next season, Žalgiris managed to reach the European Cup Winners' Cup semi-finals and won a silver medal in the Soviet league, losing a dramatic final to Budivelnyk Kiev.

Just before the start of the 1989–90 season, Žalgiris lost Sabonis, Kurtinaitis, Jovaiša, Chomičius, and head coach Garastas, as the Iron Curtain, which had barred Lithuanian basketball talent from becoming internationally sought-after, had been lifted. In the 1989–90 season, Žalgiris reached the Clubs Cup Winners' Cup semi-finals, where they lost to Real Madrid.

=== 1990–1999: Domination in the Lithuanian Basketball League and reaching the top of the EuroLeague ===
After the Act of the Re-Establishment of the State of Lithuania, Žalgiris left the USSR championship. Over the next few seasons, Žalgiris won Lithuanian championships in 1991, 1992, and 1993, and the LKF Cup in 1990. In 1992, Žalgiris won the Profbasket League - a tournament where the former best USSR teams played. They won their first LKL title in 1994, beating Atletas Kaunas 3–1 in a four-game series. Over the following two years, Žalgiris again dominated LKL tournaments, beating Atletas Kaunas 3–0 in 1995 and 3–2 (after being down 0–2 in the series) in 1996, however, European success lacked the team, as Žalgiris struggled in both the FIBA European League and FIBA European Cup qualifications. In 1996, Žalgiris finally found success participating in the 1995–96 FIBA European Cup when Rimas Kurtinaitis returned to play for his home team - Žalgiris managed to reach the semifinals, though succumbed to the powerful PAOK Thessaloniki in a two-game series. In 1997, Žalgiris again won the LKL championship, beating Žemaitijos Olimpas 3–0 in the finals, and reaching round 16 in the Saporta Cup, losing to Paris Basket Racing. Players such as Darius Lukminas, Gintaras Einikis, Kęstutis Šeštokas, Dainius Adomaitis, and Darius Maskoliūnas played for the club during this period, coached by Jonas Kazlauskas.

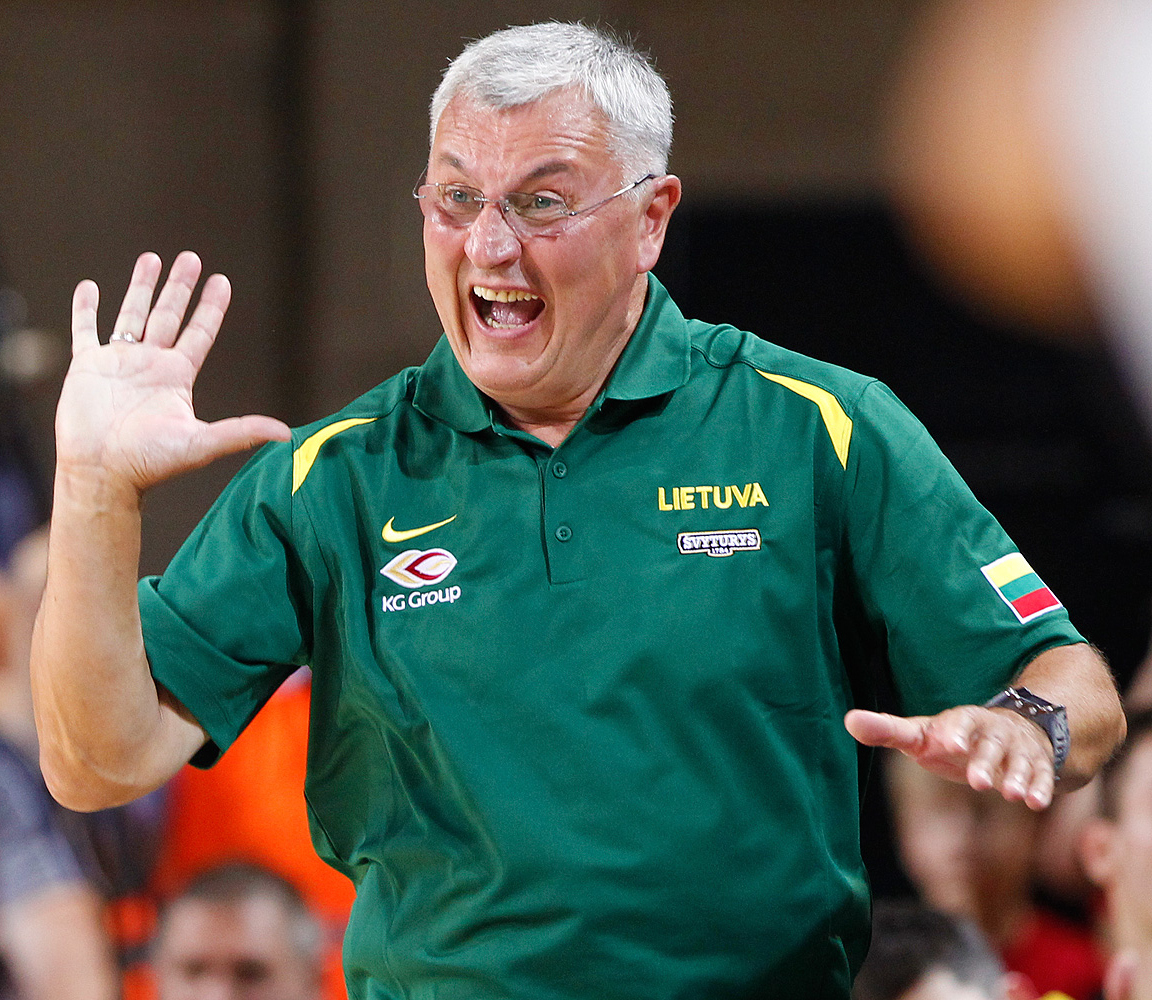
Jonas Kazlauskas, coach of the 1998–99 EuroLeague champions.

Žalgiris enjoyed its greatest success as a club during the 1997–98 and 1998–99 seasons. They were coached by Jonas Kazlauskas with a new generation of Lithuanian talent, including Saulius Štombergas, Dainius Adomaitis, Eurelijus Žukauskas, Tomas Masiulis, and Mindaugas Žukauskas, and experienced foreign players Franjo Arapović and Ennis Whatley. The team defeated Stefanel Milano 82–67 in the 1998 FIBA Saporta Cup final in Belgrade. Saulius Štombergas scored 35 points in the final. Žalgiris also won a fifth-consecutive LKL title, this time against Atletas Kaunas.

In the 1998–99 season, Žalgiris made it to the EuroLeague Final Four for the first time in the club's history, and were crowned champions after defeating Olympiacos and Kinder Bologna in the semi-final and the final, respectively. Tyus Edney was named EuroLeague Final Four MVP. Žalgiris also won LKL and North European Basketball League (NEBL) titles that season. 1999 also marked the beginning of the rivalry between Žalgiris and BC Rytas of Vilnius.

=== 1999–2004 ===
The year after winning the EuroLeague, Žalgiris suffered one of its worst seasons. The club was eliminated after the group stage in the EuroLeague, finishing third in the NEBL and losing the LKL finals to Lietuvos Rytas for the first time – a complete disaster for the previous year's EuroLeague champions. In the 2000–01 season, the team reached the new EuroLeague playoffs, but lost to AEK. Žalgiris won the LKL championship, beating Lietuvos Rytas 3–2. The 2001–02 season was a disappointment, as the team was eliminated in the EuroLeague after the group stage and lost the LKL championship to Lietuvos Rytas. In the 2002–03 season, they were again eliminated in the EuroLeague group stage, but achieved the LKL championship, beating Lietuvos Rytas 4–2.

Sabonis became the principal owner of the club in 2003, after playing for many years in the Spanish ACB League and the North American National Basketball Association (NBA). He also played for the club during the 2003–04 season, winning EuroLeague Regular Season and Top 16 MVP. Žalgiris almost made it to the EuroLeague Final Four, but were stopped by Maccabi Tel Aviv, who tied the game with Derrick Sharp's last-second three-pointer at the end of regulation and went on to beat Žalgiris in overtime. The season ended on a high note, as Žalgiris swept Lietuvos Rytas 4–0 in the LKL championship. Paulius Jankūnas also made his debut with Žalgiris during the season.

=== 2004–2009: Post-Sabonis era ===
After the departure of Sabonis at the conclusion of the 2003–04 season, Žalgiris faced a series of ups and downs. In the 2004–05 season, mainstays Tanoka Beard, Mindaugas Timinskas, Dainius Šalenga, and new addition Robert Pack enabled Žalgiris to have a respectable season. In the EuroLeague, Žalgiris finished the regular season with an 8–6 record, including wins on the road against heavy favorites Maccabi Tel Aviv and FC Barcelona. However, in the Top 16 phase, the team entered a long slump and finished with an 0–6 record. Žalgiris recovered on the domestic front, easily defeating ULEB Cup winner Lietuvos Rytas in the LKL finals with a 4–0 sweep, and also won the inaugural Baltic Basketball League (BBL) championship, beating Lietuvos Rytas in the finals 64–60.

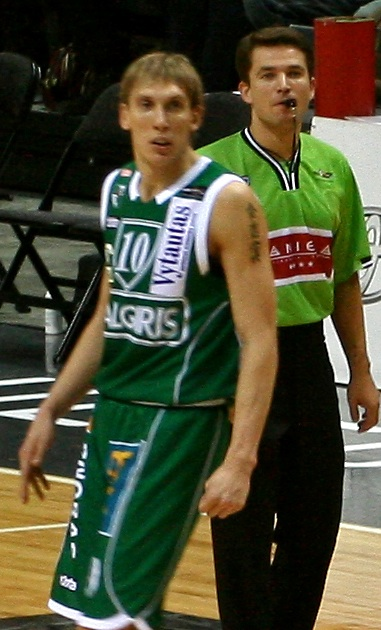
Dainius Šalenga dedicated most of his career for Žalgiris

In the 2005–06 season, the team suffered many changes. Mindaugas Timinskas, Dainius Šalenga, and Robert Pack all departed the team, so Žalgiris built a younger team while signing Ed Cota to return. With the emergence of Darjuš Lavrinovič, Žalgiris started the season solidly, finishing the EuroLeague regular season with a 9–5 record. Off-court, Žalgiris had many issues, resulting in a huge slump for the team. They ended the top-16 phase with another 0–6 record and lost both the LKL and BBL titles to Lietuvos Rytas. The lone bright spot became the play of emerging point guard Mantas Kalnietis, who was signed both as a replacement for the released Cota and due to very poor play from new point guard and longtime NBA player Kenny Anderson.

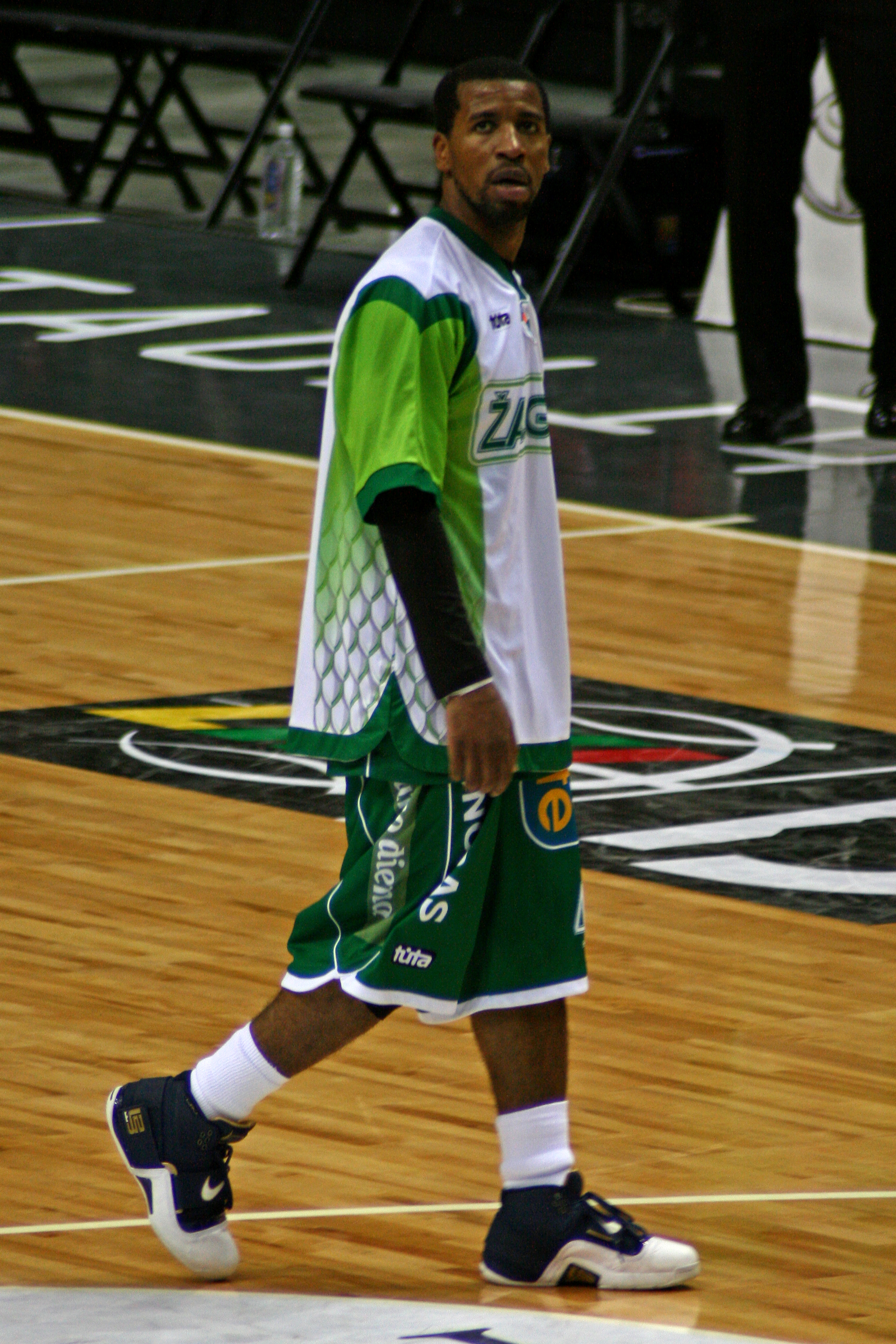
DeJuan Collins, one of the team's leaders in the 2007–08 season.

Žalgiris had a new coach for the 2006–07 season, Ainars Bagatskis, but suffered a terrible EuroLeague regular season. After Ainars Bagatskis was replaced by assistant coach Rimantas Grigas and the signing of new point guard DeJuan Collins, Žalgiris won the newly established LKF Cup by beating Lietuvos Rytas. Žalgiris also beat Lietuvos Rytas in the LKL finals.

Before the 2007–08 season, Žalgiris signed longtime EuroLeague player Marcus Brown. Žalgiris also played against NBA teams for the first time. The team had a successful regular season in the EuroLeague, finishing with an 8–6 record, but suffered another disappointment in the top 16, finishing with a 1–5 record. Žalgiris also won the LKF Cup for the second consecutive year, beating Lietuvos Rytas 83–72 in the finals. In the BBL finals, Žalgiris defeated Lietuvos Rytas 86–84 in the finals on a last-second shot by Collins. Žalgiris retained the LKL title, beating Lietuvos Rytas 4–1 in the LKL finals in which Brown was named MVP.

The 2008–09 season started on a very high note, with contract extensions for Jonas Mačiulis and Loren Woods, retaining leader Marcus Brown, and the signing of new point guard Willie Deane, who replaced the departed DeJuan Collins. However, financial difficulties lead to poor play from the team and the firing of coach Grigas, who was replaced by longtime player and assistant coach Gintaras Krapikas. Willie Deane was soon released, in large part due to his poor performance in the EuroLeague, which led to a seven-game losing streak. The team recovered under point guard Mantas Kalnietis, and finished the EuroLeague regular season with a 2–8 record, missing the top 16. Despite growing financial difficulties, and the departure of Loren Woods, the team made the LKL and BBL finals, as well as the LKF Cup finals. Despite this, this was the most Žalgiris could accomplish, as they lost to Lietuvos Rytas. Jonas Mačiulis and Jankūnas, who became the team leaders between 2005 and 2009, left after the season ended.

=== 2009–2013: Vladimir Romanov era ===
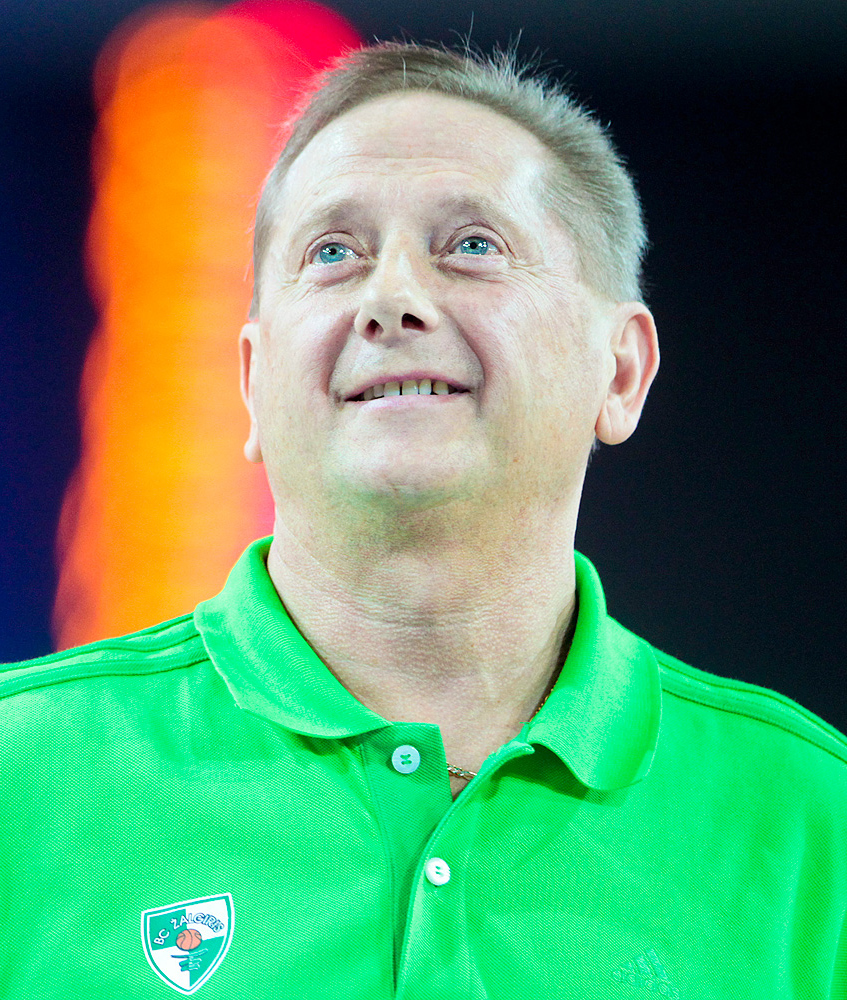
Vladimir Romanov, the team's owner from 2009 to 2013.

During the 2008–09 season, Žalgiris faced significant financial difficulties. In 2009, Sabonis sold most of his stake to the local Ūkio banko investment group (ŪBIG), headed by Vladimir Romanov, who ended up controlling a 75% stake in the club. Sabonis retained 21.5% ownership of the club, 3% was owned by a minority group, and 0.5% was owned by the Kaunas municipality.

In the 2009–10 season, Romanov became unpopular among Žalgiris fans. After the departures of Jonas Mačiulis and Paulius Jankūnas, the team extended the contract of Marcus Brown and also signed Martynas Pocius, who quickly became one of the best players on the team. The team also re-signed point guard Mantas Kalnietis, coming of his best season in 2008–09, and who turned down an offer from Benetton Treviso. The team started the season by winning the new BBL Cup against Lietuvos Rytas. However, subsequent poor performances led to head coach Krapikas being replaced by former Lithuanian national team coach Ramūnas Butautas, who led the team to the EuroLeague Top-16 phase with a 3–7 regular season record. Under Butautas, Žalgiris also won the bronze medal in the VTB League. After the team entered a slump, Romanov controversially fired Butautas, replacing him with assistant coach and former captain Darius Maskoliūnas. Under Maskoliūnas, Žalgiris came its closest to the EuroLeague Top-8 phase, finishing with a 2–4 record. Žalgiris won back the BBL title by beating Lietuvos Rytas in the finals, but in the LKL finals, Rytas won the series 4–3. Romanov fired coach Maskoliūnas during this series - Marcus Brown took over as the player-coach, leading to speculation that Romanov had intentionally lost the finals to allow Lietuvos Rytas to qualify for the EuroLeague season. The season is widely considered the most controversial in club history.

Before the 2010–11 season, Žalgiris re-signed Paulius Jankūnas and DeJuan Collins, signed Tomas Delininkaitis, and brought in Serbian coach Aleksandar Petrović as the new head coach. The season began with Žalgiris playing very strongly, but after a slump, Romanov fired Petrović. They qualified for the Top-16 phase only in the final games, with a 5–5 record. After a controversial departure from center Mirza Begić, the slump continued under new coach Ilias Zouros, with a 1–5 record in the Top-16 phase. Žalgiris also failed to qualify for the VTB League Final Four tournament - a huge disappointment for the team. However, after the recovery of Marcus Brown (who was injured for most of the season), Žalgiris won back the LKF Cup from Lietuvos Rytas and defeated VEF Riga in the BBL finals. In the LKL finals, Žalgiris easily defeated Lietuvos Rytas 4–1, regaining the LKL title for the first time since 2008.

Due to the NBA lockout that impacted the 2011–12 season, Žalgiris signed former Toronto Raptors wing Sonny Weems and former Denver Nuggets point guard Ty Lawson. The team also re-signed long-time fan-favorite Marko Popović and signed longtime Lietuvos Rytas player and former Lithuanian National team captain Robertas Javtokas as center. However, the season started very poorly for Žalgiris. Hoping to end the slump, Romanov fired coach Ilias Zouros and replaced him with former Lietuvos Rytas head coach Aleksandar Trifunović – a decision hugely unpopular with Žalgiris fans. Despite initial improvement, with the team finishing the EuroLeague regular season with a 4–6 record and a trip to the Top 16, the slump continued and the team's EuroLeague season ended quickly. After Ty Lawson left the team, Mantas Kalnietis became a true leader for Žalgiris and played his best season yet. The team slowly recovered, winning the LKF Cup. After being eliminated in the VTB playoffs, in an embarrassing fashion, by Lokomotiv Kuban, Žalgiris made the BBL Final Four, winning against Lietuvos Rytas in the finals despite losing leader Sonny Weems (who was released due to injury) and DeJuan Collins (who was released due to failing a drug test). With very solid play from Marko Popovič and Tomas Delininkaitis, Žalgiris retained the LKL title, defeating Lietuvos Rytas in the finals 3–0. The club had achieved a second consecutive "triple crown" of Lithuanian League, Lithuanian Cup, and Baltic Cup.

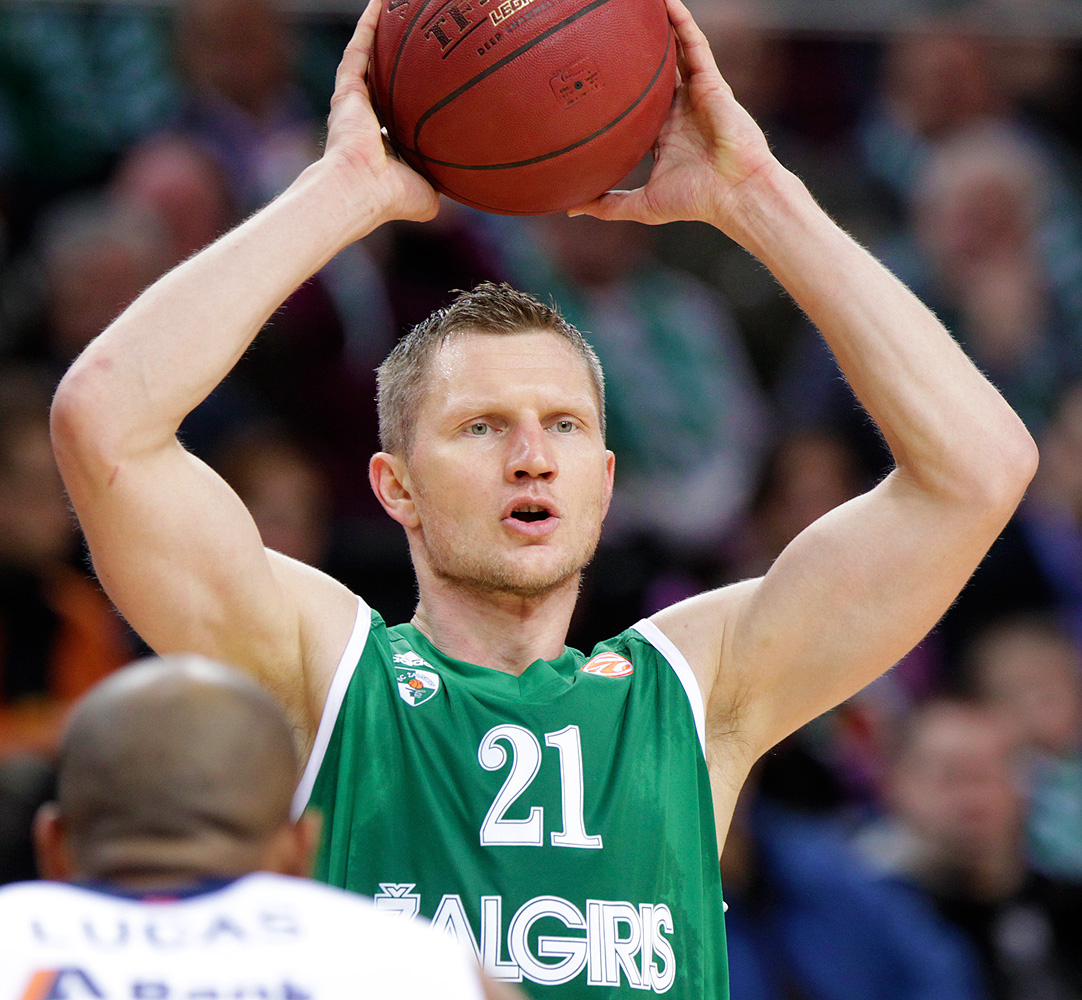
Rimantas Kaukėnas, one of the best players from the 2012–13 season.

For the 2012–13 season, Žalgiris signed Lithuanian national team players Rimantas Kaukėnas, Darjuš Lavrinovič, and Kšyštof Lavrinovič; Unicaja Malaga star Tremmell Darden; and point guard Oliver Lafayette. The season began with Žalgiris winning the newly established LKF SuperCup against Lietuvos Rytas. Early in the season, Mantas Kalnietis left the team and was replaced by Ibrahim Jaaber. Under new coach Joan Plaza, Žalgiris had their best EuroLeague start with five consecutive wins. They finished at the top of their group for the first time in 13 years, with an 8–2 record. In their 76–66 home victory against CSKA Moscow, Žalgiris broke their attendance record, with 15,812 spectators. In January 2013, Jaaber departed from the team for personal reasons and was replaced by Donnie McGrath in February. In the coming months, financial troubles returned to the club, which led to the departure of Darden. The crisis coincided with the ongoing collapse of Ūkio Bankas. The bank's main shareholder Vladimir Romanov, who also owned the majority of shares of Žalgiris and was the club's president, abruptly left the country and flew to Russia in early March 2013, abandoning his stake in the club. On 20 March 2013, vice president Paulius Motiejūnas was named the team director. Despite the financial and management struggles, Žalgiris finished the Top-16 phase with a 6–8 record, the best in club history, but narrowly missed the playoffs. Žalgiris also won the group phase in the VTB United League. In May, Žalgiris won their third straight LKL title, sweeping Lietuvos Rytas 4–0 in the finals. After winning the LKL title, Žalgiris competed in the VTB United League playoffs, defeating Nizhny Novgorod in the quarterfinals but losing to Lokomotiv Kuban in the semi-finals. Despite the loss, Žalgiris was awarded the bronze medal for the first time since 2010.

=== 2013–2016: A new direction ===
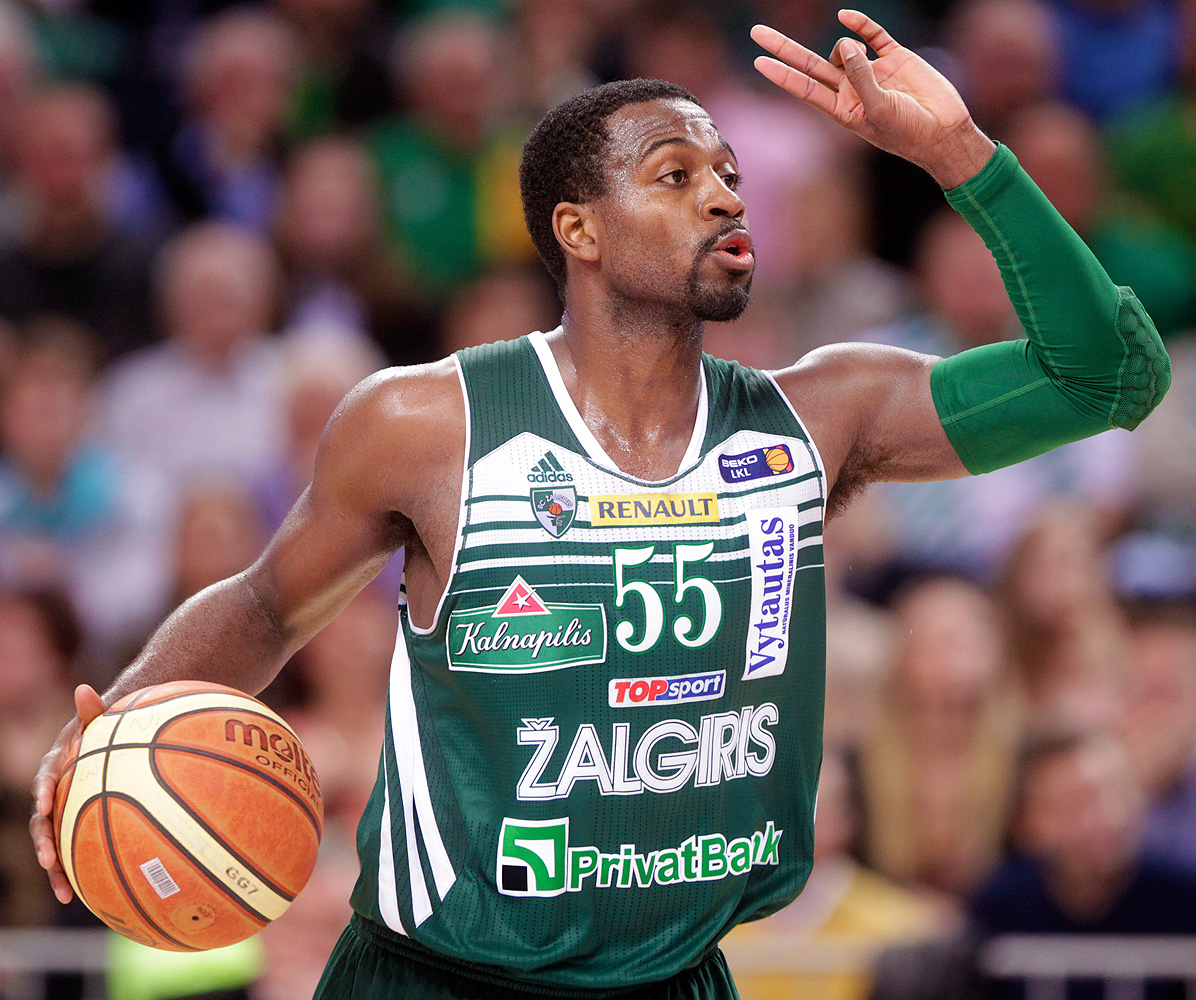
Justin Dentmon, leader of the team for the 2013–14 season

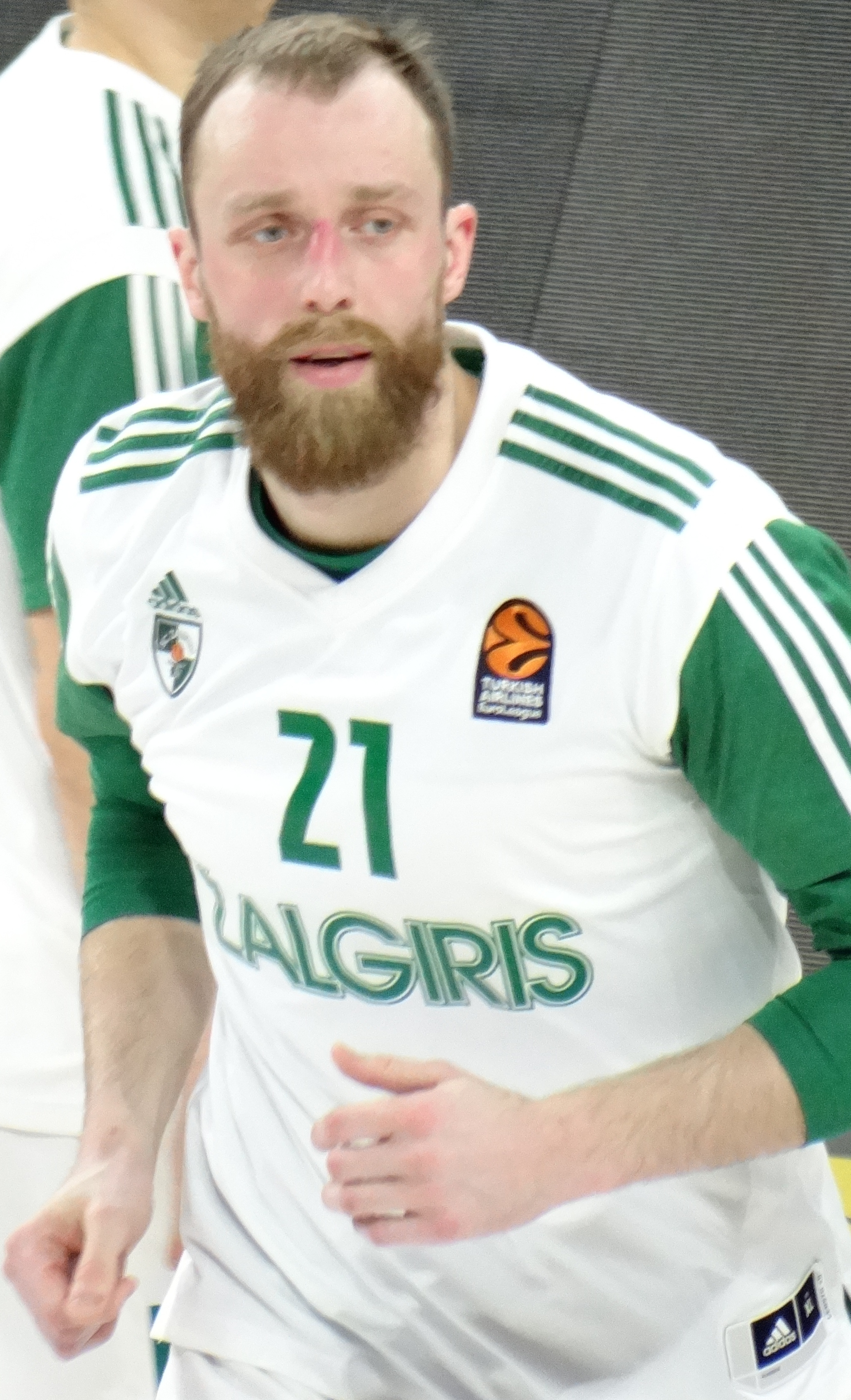
Artūras Milaknis was one of the finest three-point specialists in Europe during the 2014–15 season.

After the loss of team owner Vladimir Romanov and the departure of head coach Joan Plaza, Žalgiris rehired Ilias Zouros as head coach for the 2013–14 season. Žalgiris left the VTB United League because of the changes in the EuroLeague format that meant that the teams who did not qualify for the Top 16 would have a chance to play in the EuroCup playoffs.

Žalgiris signed Justin Dentmon and Šarūnas Jasikevičius to one-year deals. After a poor start to the season, Zouros was fired as head coach and replaced by Saulius Štombergas. Žalgiris made the Top 16 for the fifth consecutive time (with a 5–5 record). However, Žalgiris began to struggle in the LKL. The Top 16 proved to be difficult, for Žalgiris, though competetive, still finishing with a losing record (a 2–12 record overall). After a few losses in the LKF Cup and the LKL, Štombergas resigned and was replaced by Gintaras Krapikas as interim head coach. In the last week of Top-16 play at home, Žalgiris beat Spanish champions Real Madrid. Justin Dentmon scored 36 points in that game, the most by a Žalgiris player in modern EuroLeague, and Dentmon also made 74 three-pointers during the season (a EuroLeague record since 2000). Dentmon had became a complete leader for Žalgiris during the year.

After a loss to Lietuvos Rytas in the final LKL regular season game, Žalgiris entered the playoffs as the fourth seed, the worst in club history. They faced Lietuvos Rytas again in the semi-finals - Žalgiris beat Lietuvos Rytas 2–1 in the semifinals, with the 73–71 win in game 3 in Vilnius considered as one of the best games of the entire rivalry. Žalgiris advanced to the finals against Neptūnas Klaipėda, taking the series 4–2 and winning their fourth consecutive LKL championship.

During the 2014–15 preseason, Žalgiris made significant changes to the squad, replacing Justin Dentmon with Maalik Wayns, who was in turn replaced by Will Cherry. Žalgiris also signed Darius Songaila from rival Lietuvos Rytas and James Anderson from the NBA. Šarūnas Jasikevičius retired and became an assistant coach, and more young players were brought to the team. Young point guard Lukas Lekavičius was the main bright spot as the team began LKL play. In the EuroLeague, a 5–5 record sent Žalgiris to the top 16 phase where the team finished with a 5–9 record. In February, Žalgiris won the LKF Cup for the first time in three years. Žalgiris finished the LKL regular season in dominating fashion, with 12 straight wins, and they defeated Lietuvos Rytas in the finals. This win was the club's fifth consecutive LKL title and their 17th overall.

Žalgiris had a total of seven players who competed in EuroBasket 2015 - including new signing Renaldas Seibutis, former Rytas leader. They finished the off-season by signing Ian Vougioukas at center. Žalgiris finished the 2015–16 EuroLeague regular season with a 5–5 record and qualified for the Top-16 phase for the seventh consecutive season. After a poor start to the Top 16, head coach Krapikas was replaced by Šarūnas Jasikevičius, but injuries to Javtokas and the departure of Kalnietis led the team to a huge slump and a loss to Lietuvos Rytas in the King Mindaugas Cup final. After strong criticism of the team management for not finding a center to replace Javtokas, Žalgiris signed new point guard Jerome Randle. While the EuroLeague season ended with a 2–12 record, a hugely disappointing result, the team later recovered by finishing in 1st place in the LKL regular season over King Mindaugas Cup winner Lietuvos Rytas. Žalgiris defeated Neptūnas Klaipėda in the LKL finals, winning their sixth consecutive LKL title with a 4–1 record.

=== 2016–present: New EuroLeague format ===
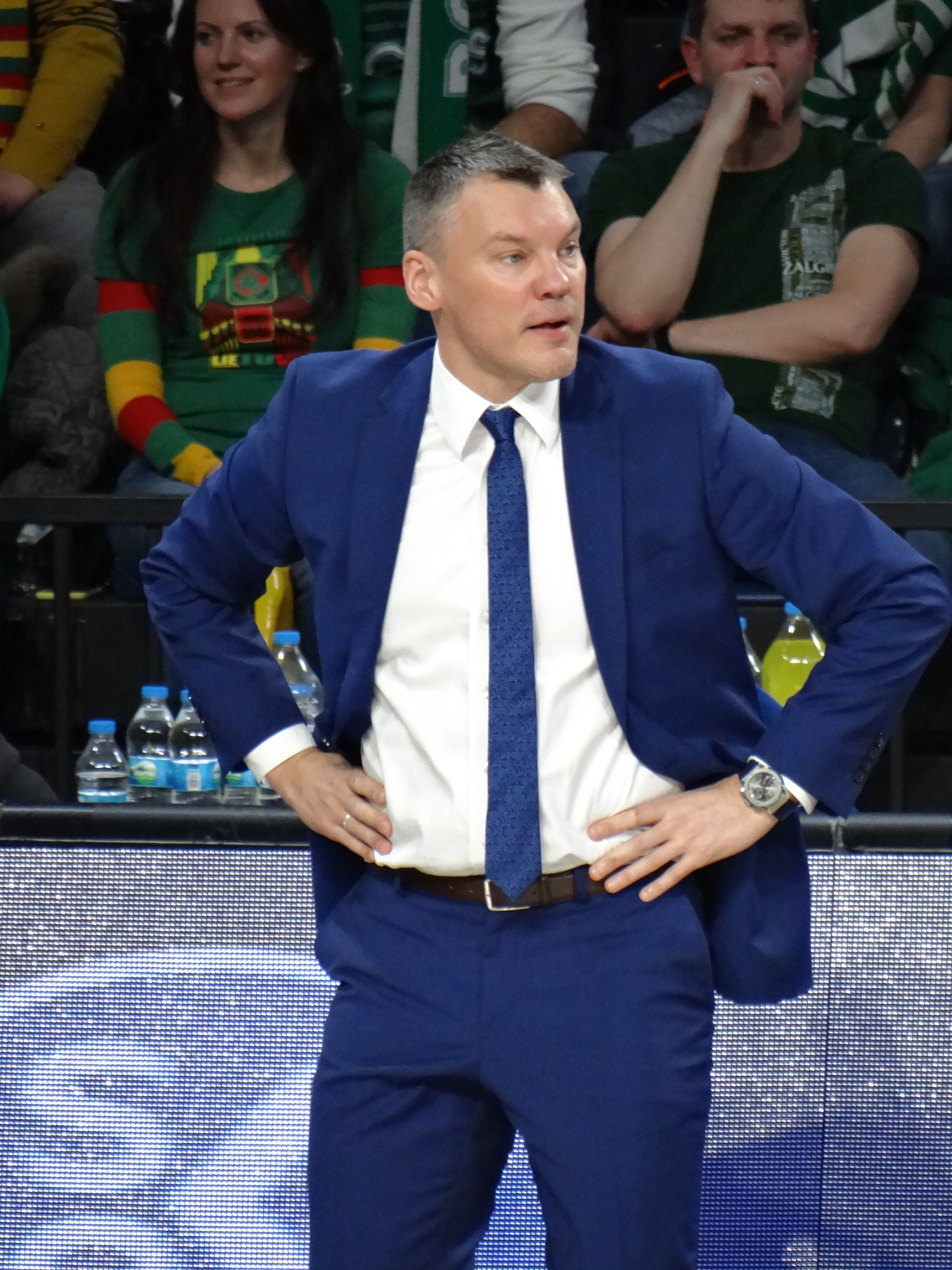
Šarūnas Jasikevičius, one of the all-time greatest Lithuanian basketball players, started coaching Žalgiris in 2016.

In November 2015, the ongoing conflict between FIBA and Euroleague came to a head when FIBA announced the formation of the Basketball Champions League, and courted EuroLeague teams to join their new championship. However, EuroLeague's long-term-license teams, such as Žalgiris, decided to stay with the Euroleague Basketball Company.

==== 2016–17 ====
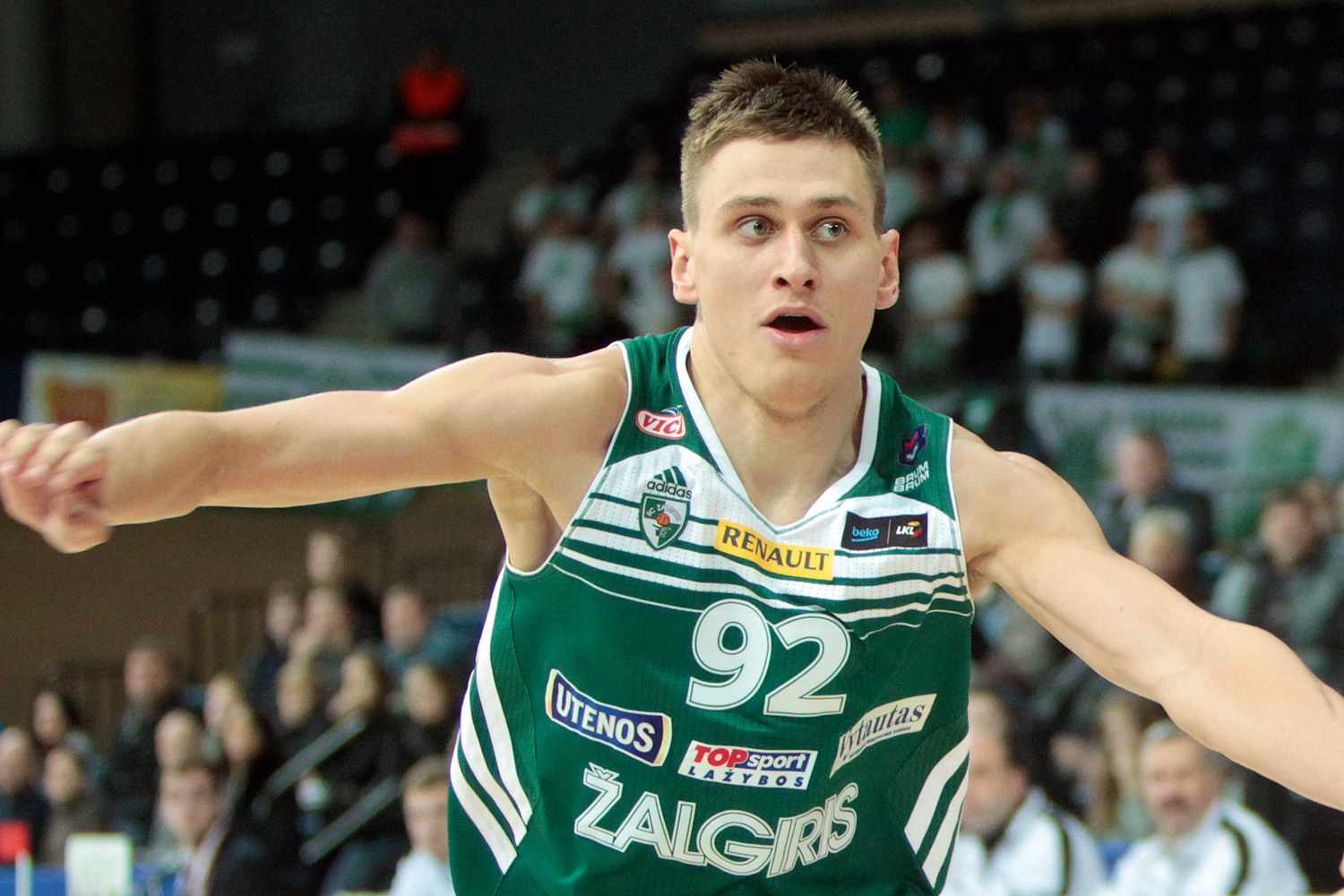
Edgaras Ulanovas won five LKL Finals MVP titles from 2015 to 2020.

Žalgiris's preparation for the 2016–17 season began during the 2016 LKL finals, when the club signed point guard Léo Westermann to replace the departing Jerome Randle. After the season, long-time Žalgiris players Siim-Sander Vene and Kaspars Vecvagars left the team, while Žalgiris chose to retain the services of Seibutis and Motum. Head coach Jasikevičius was pursued by FC Barcelona Lassa, but decided to remain with Žalgiris. To correct the previous season's lack of a good shooter, Žalgiris signed Kevin Pangos; the team was loaned Augusto Lima from Real Madrid to replace Vougioukas at center. Žalgiris also signed the returning Artūras Milaknis to a 3-year deal. German prospect Isaiah Hartenstein was scheduled to make his professional debut after being signed the previous season. In August, Žalgiris signed Antanas Kavaliauskas, the captain of Lietuvos Rytas who had previously promised to never play for Žalgiris; Kavaliauskas apologized to fans after the signing was announced.

In February, Žalgiris won their first title of the 2016–17 season, winning the King Mindaugas Cup by defeating Lietkabelis Panevėžys in the finals 84–63. Edgaras Ulanovas was named tournament MVP. In the EuroLeague, Žalgiris exceeded expectations with a 10th-place finish (14–16 record), getting a win against defending champion CSKA Moscow and finishing ahead of FC Barcelona Lassa and Maccabi Tel Aviv. Players Brock Motum, Léo Westermann, Edgaras Ulanovas, and Lukas Lekavičius developed strongly, Renaldas Seibutis played the best defense of his career, and team captain Paulius Jankūnas played one of his best seasons of his career, leading the team in scoring and rebounding. In the LKL, Žalgiris won the regular season with only a few losses, sweeping their rival Lietuvos Rytas, with the toughest challenge coming from a powerful Lietkabelis squad that contained former Žalgiris players Darjuš and Kšyštof Lavrinovič. In the LKL playoffs, Žalgiris easily advanced to the finals, defeating Lietkabelis for their seventh straight LKL championship, 4–1. Robertas Javtokas retired as a player at the end of the season and became the new sporting director for Žalgiris.

==== 2017–18 ====
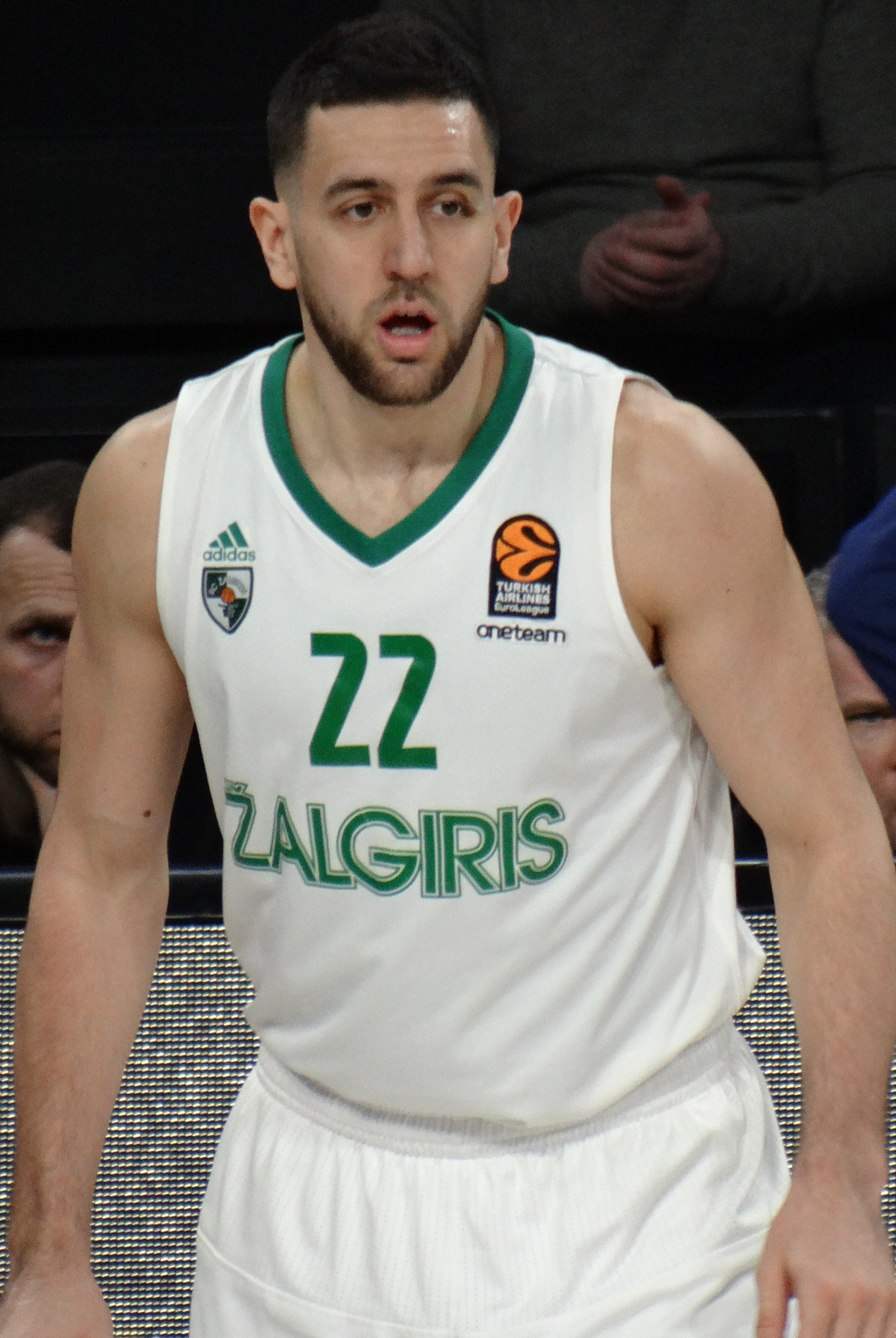
Vasilije Micić

Prior the 2017–18 season, Žalgiris reached an agreement with club sponsor Avia Solutions Group to guarantee private flights for the team during away games in a refurbished business-class Boeing 737. The off-season work began just a week after winning the LKL championship, when breakout player Brock Motum signed with Anadolu Efes S.K. To replace Motum, Žalgiris signed Aaron White, who had played a season with Zenit Saint Petersburg. Léo Westerman signed with CSKA Moscow, and was replaced by talented guard Vasilije Micić. To replace Seibutis, Žalgiris originally signed Royce O'Neale, who terminated his deal just weeks later to sign with the Utah Jazz. Žalgiris then signed Axel Toupane to replace him. Because center Robertas Javtokas announced retirement and the loan of Augusto Lima ended, Žalgiris signed Brandon Davies of AS Monaco Basket at the center position. The most-shocking departure came at the end of June, when breakout point guard Lukas Lekavičius signed a contract with Panathinaikos. Needing a new point guard, Žalgiris signed Dee Bost, also of AS Monaco. Coach Jasikevičius also re-signed with Žalgiris, and the retired Javtokas became the new sports director of the team. On September 22, Žalgiris played a game in London against Polski Cukier Toruń, which Žalgiris won 87–61.

Žalgiris won the King Mindaugas Cup for the second consecutive year, defeating Lietuvos rytas 81–62 in the finals. Edgaras Ulanovas won the tournament MVP for the second straight year.

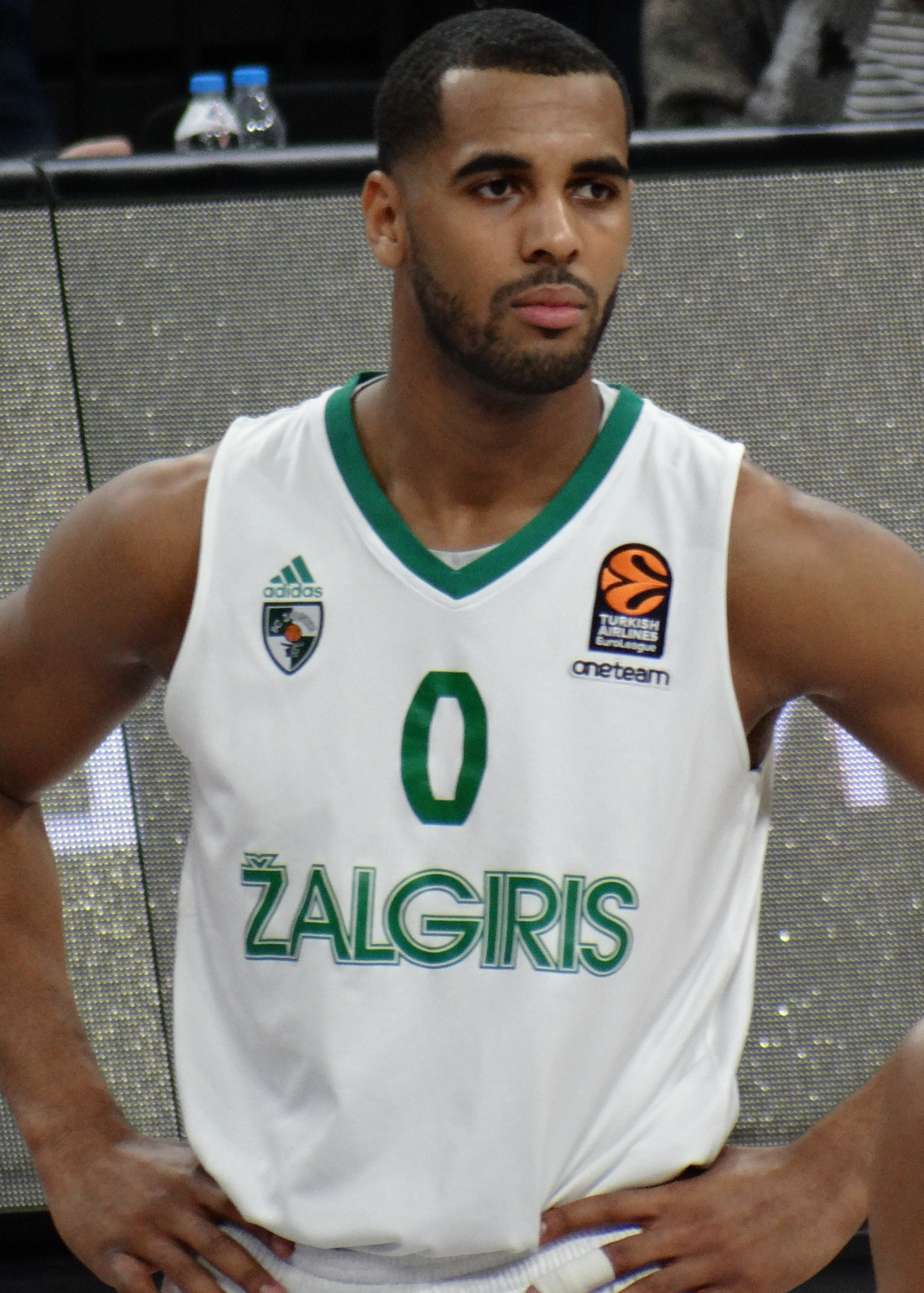
From 2017 to 2019, Brandon Davies was Žalgiris's central piece and led the team to their first EuroLeague Final Four since 1998–99.

In the 2017–18 EuroLeague, Žalgiris was again projected to be one of the worst teams. Žalgiris struggled in the early season before putting together a five-game streak to finish the first round 10–5, tied for third place in the standings. In the second round, Dee Bost was replaced by Beno Udrih. Žalgiris struggled for the first few weeks of the second round, but fought its way to an 18–12 record (sixth place) and qualification for the EuroLeague playoffs for the first time since 2001. The team qualified for the 2018 EuroLeague Final Four after beating Olympiacos in game 4 to clinch a 3–1 series win. The team achieved this despite having the second-lowest budget in the league. Žalgiris lost to Fenerbahçe in the semifinals, 76–67. In the third-place game, Žalgiris faced longtime rivals CSKA Moscow; Žalgiris led by as much as 24 points, but CSKA's late-game rally made it so Žalgiris only narrowly won 79–77, achieving third place in the EuroLeague.

In the LKL, Žalgiris won the regular season and beat Lietuvos Rytas in the finals with a 4–1 record, earning their eighth consecutive LKL championship. This was the club's best season since 1999.

After a near-perfect season, the off-season was difficult. Žalgiris lost its front court as Pangos went to FC Barcelona Lassa and Micič signed with Efes. Žalgiris signed Nate Wolters as the team's new point guard. After the departure of Beno Udrih, Žalgiris signed Donatas Sabeckis from Šiauliai, who lead the LKL in assists. Toupane left the team to sign with Olympiacos; to replace him, Žalgiris signed former-teammate Marius Grigonis, who was having a successful career abroad, to a multi-year deal. They also signed talented guard/forward Thomas Walkup. To replace reserve Martynas Sajus, Žalgiris signed Laurynas Birutis, who was loaned to and had a successful season with Šiauliai. Several more reserves, Paulius Valinskas and Gytis Masiulis, were loaned to other LKL teams so that they could gain more playing time. Ulanovas also signed a new contract. Like the previous season, the biggest concern was the future of coach Jasikevičius. Despite offers from other EuroLeague teams and the Toronto Raptors, Jasikevičius remained with Žalgiris, signing a new contract. Former player Tomas Masiulis replaced Darius Songaila in the coaching staff. In September, Žalgiris signed the returning Léo Westermann to fill the point guard spot.

==== 2018–19 ====
The newly reformed Žalgiris struggled at the start of the 2018–19 EuroLeague season. Needing another point guard, Žalgiris signed Derrick Walton in October. By December, Žalgiris was in sixth place with a 7–7 record. However, injuries decimated the team. Walton's disappointing play led to decreasing playing time and a release in February 2019. Later in February, Žalgiris suffered a loss in the King Mindaugas Cup to Rytas Vilnius, losing the tournament for the first time since 2016 – a disaster for Žalgiris. By the start of March, Žalgiris was 13th in the EuroLeague with a 9–15 record. The team's play started to improve when Walkup was pushed to the point guard position to replace Walton, Westermann returned after being injured, and improving play by Thompson led to a six-game winning streak. Their 15–15 record clinched the final spot in the playoffs, with massive away wins over Maccabi Tel Aviv, Olympiakos Piraeus and Real Madrid. In the EuroLeague playoffs, Žalgiris lost to Fenerbahçe. Žalgiris broke the EuroLeague's home attendance record with an average of 14,808 spectators in the Žalgiris Arena. In the 2018–19 LKL season, Žalgiris finished the regular season in first place, and swept the series finals against Rytas, winning the series 3–0, for a ninth consecutive LKL championship.

==== 2019–20 ====
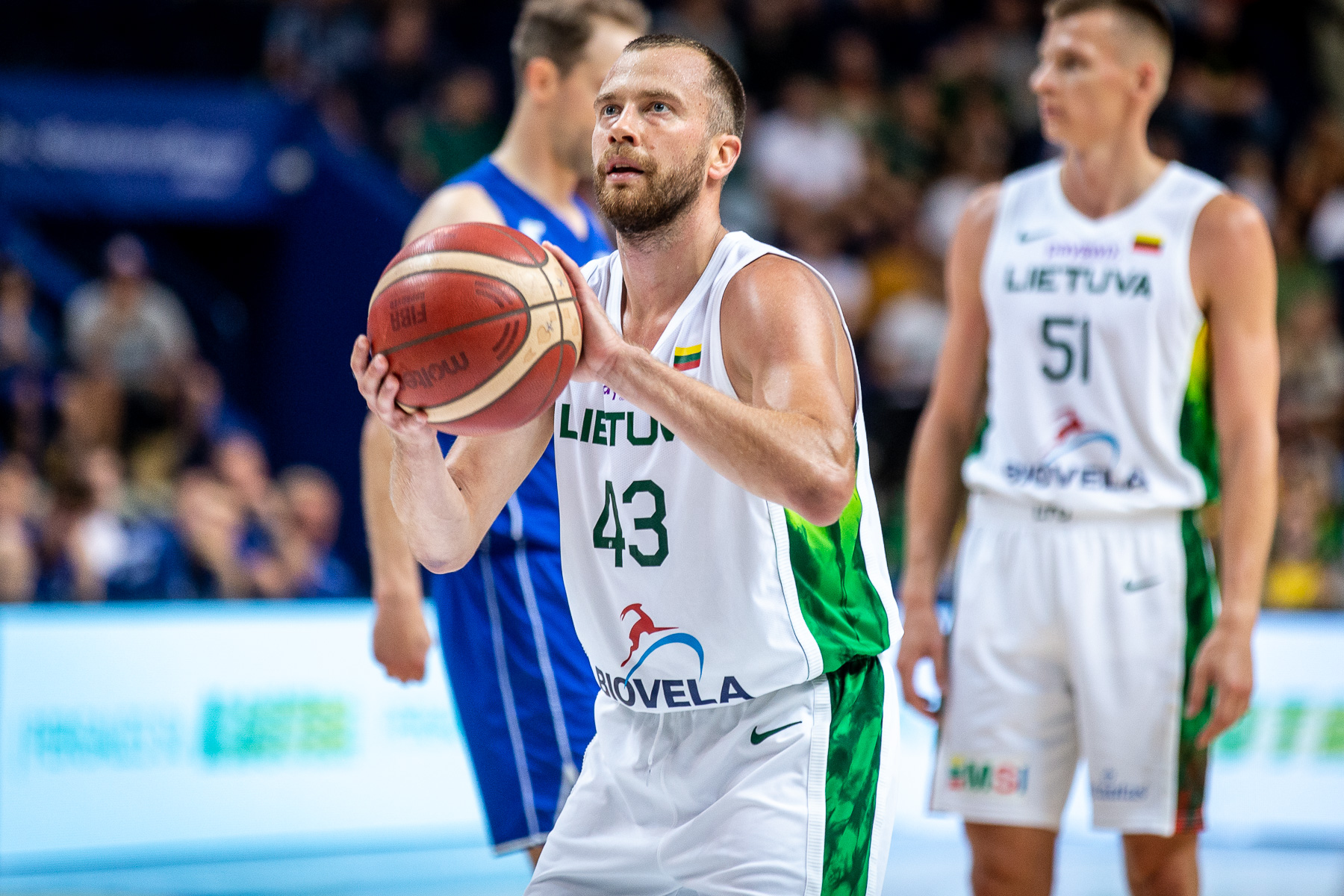
Lukas Lekavičius, who returned to Žalgiris in 2019.

During the off-season, many players (including Westermann and Thompson) left the team, with Antanas Kavaliauskas announcing his retirement after a few very successful seasons with Žalgiris. Lukas Lekavičius returned to the team after two seasons in Greece, and Alex Pérez was signed to replace Westermann. Jock Landale and Zach LeDay, of Olympiacos, were signed to complete the front court. Martinas Geben, who had signed a long-term deal the previous summer, earned a spot on the roster after a successful season with Juventus Utena in the LKL, where he was named Season MVP. Coach Jasikevičius remained with the team for one more season. Pérez, however, spent just a few months with Žalgiris, and was released in November due to his weak play. Žalgiris also signed shooting-guard K. C. Rivers in November.

Žalgiris won the King Mindaugas Cup by beating Rytas Vilnius 80–60 in the finals. Ulanovas was named the MVP of the tournament, his fourth MVP award in Lithuanian Cup competitions. Due to the COVID-19 outbreak, the 2019–20 LKL season was ended prematurely, and with Žalgiris firmly leading the standings, Žalgiris was announced as champions, their 10th consecutive LKL championship. In the 2019–20 EuroLeague, Žalgiris struggled for most of the season, including plummeting to the bottom of the standings, but recovered by February 2020, finishing with a 12–16 record. With the EuroLeague season stopped due to the COVID-19 outbreak, Žalgiris finished in ninth place.

==== 2020–21 ====
With the season ending prematurely due to the COVID-19 situation, Žalgiris started their off-season work early. LeDay, Landale, Ulanovas, and Rivers all left the team during the summer, but the biggest departure was of coach Jasikevičius, who left Žalgiris (along with the rest of the coaching staff) and signed with FC Barcelona in July. On July 14, Žalgiris announced the signing of Martin Schiller as the team's new head coach. Schiller had previously worked with the Salt Lake City Stars of the NBA G League, and had been named the NBA G League Coach of the Year in 2020. Schiller brought in Arne Woltmann and Tautvydas Sabonis as his assistant coaches, with Evaldas Beržininkaitis being the only person remaining on the team from Jasikevičius's old staff. Žalgiris brought in a bevy of new players, but the most surprising signing happened in June when Žalgiris bought out Marek Blaževič, a talented prospect, out of rival squad Rytas Vilnius.

While the expectations for the upcoming season were not promising under Schiller, Žalgiris surprised everyone and stayed in the playoff hunt throughout the 2020–21 EuroLeague season. Despite eventually not making the playoffs, Žalgiris finished the EuroLeague season with a respectable 17–17 record. Marius Grigonis, Joffrey Lauvergne and Nigel Hayes had their breakout seasons in the EuroLeague. They won the King Mindaugas Cup and their 11th consecutive LKL final by beating Rytas 3–0.

==== 2021–22 ====
In 2021, Žalgiris signed Tyler Cavanaugh, Niels Giffey, Mantas Kalnietis, Josh Nebo, Edgaras Ulanovas, Jānis Strēlnieks, and Emmanuel Mudiay. They also extended their contract with Lukas Lekavičius. Žalgiris lost all five LKL preseason games, playing seemingly worse each game. Žalgiris had a difficult start in the 2021 LKL regular season—while they won all three games, they struggled even against the weakest of teams. After a 0–2 start in the EuroLeague, Žalgiris fired coach Martin Schiller, replacing him with Jure Zdovc. Injuries to players such as Lauvergne and Strelnieks, struggles in the LKL, and disappointing play from projected leaders such as Mudiay resulted in the worst start ever (0–9) for Žalgiris in the Euroleague. In the LKL, a loss to BC Rytas resulted in Žalgiris falling out of first place.

Žalgiris released Mudiay in November, replacing him with point guard Tai Webster, and signed shooting guard Zoran Dragić. The moves backfired—Webster struggled even in the LKL, while Dragič rarely saw playing time and was released by the end of the year. New signees such as Regimantas Miniotas also saw limited playing time. Losses in the Euroleague resulted in Žalgiris attendance falling to record lows. By February, Žalgiris was in last place with a disastrous 4–20 record, but recovered by March 2022, including memorable wins over the Jasikevičius-lead FC Barcelona and Real Madrid, future participants of the Euroleague Final Four, in particular thanks to the return of Joffrey Lauvergne from injury. Žalgiris also won the 2022 King Mindaugas Cup, beating BC Lietkabelis 91–66 in the finals.

Žalgiris was the first team to refuse to play against Russian teams in the EuroLeague (CSKA Moscow, Kazan Unics, and Zenit St. Petersburg) due to the Russian invasion of Ukraine, even gaining criticism in the Russian press for being one of the reasons Russian teams got disqualified. They finished the EuroLeague season with a memorable 103–98 win against KK Crvena zvezda. Žalgiris finished the EuroLeague season with an 8–20 record, above the disqualified CSKA, UNICS, and Zenit, but still in last place of the eligible teams—their worst EuroLeague finish since the 2015–16 season.

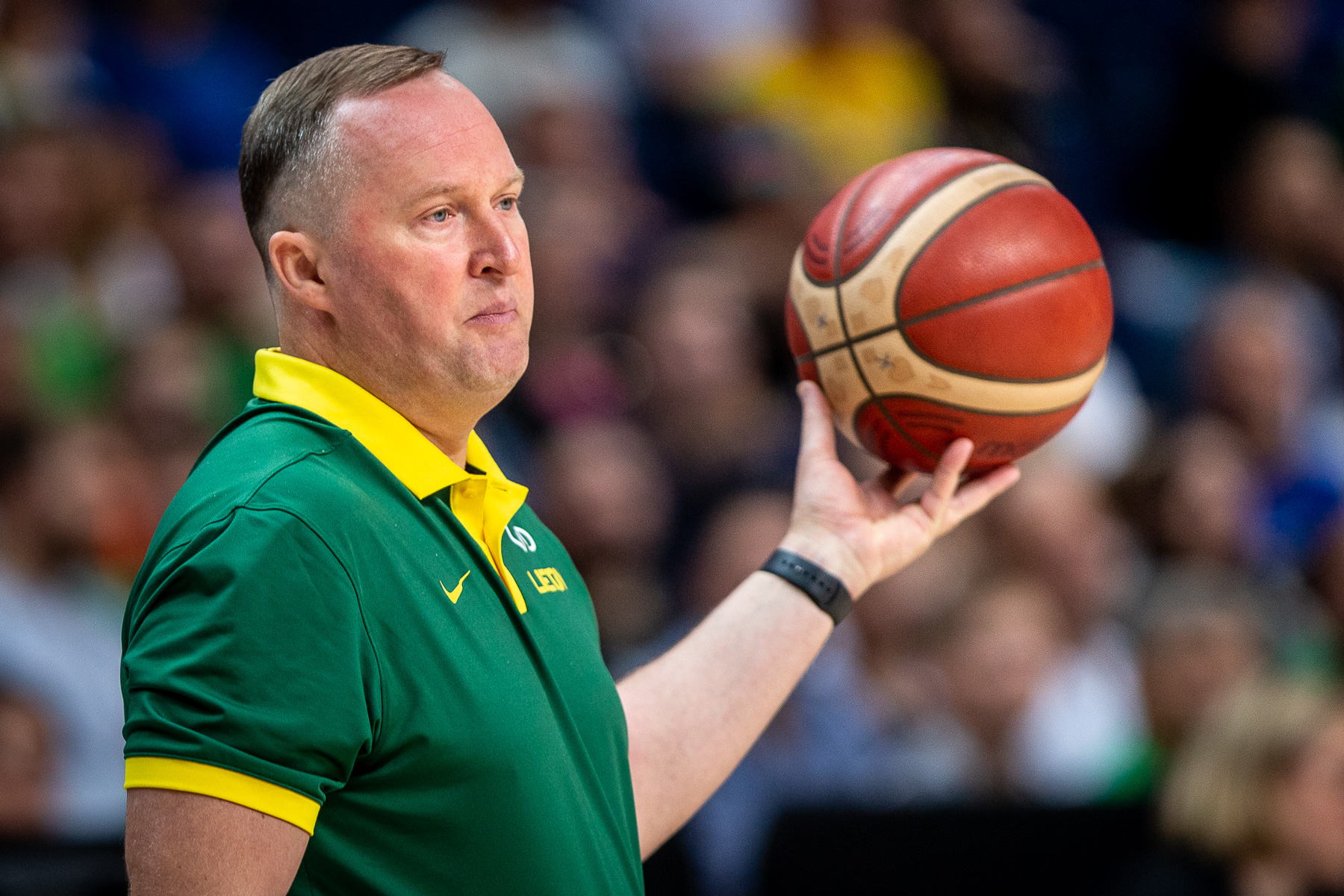
Kazys Maksvytis, who started coaching Žalgiris in 2022.

By the start of April, disappointment returned to Žalgiris. Struggles in the LKL resulted in Žalgiris once again falling behind Rytas in the standings, and they ended up finishing behind Rytas in the standings for the first time since the 2013–14 season. Žalgiris replaced Zdovc later in the month, signing Lithuanian national basketball team coach Kazys Maksvytis as their new head coach. The struggles continued under Maksvytis, who failed to find a good lineup or rotation with the existing roster.

In the LKL playoffs, the struggles became even more evident. Žalgiris needed all five games to beat BC Neptūnas in the quarterfinals, narrowly winning the series 3–2. Žalgiris won the first semifinal game against BC Lietkabelis, before losing the next three games – Lietkabelis won the series 3–1. Žalgiris had failed to qualify to the LKL finals for the first time ever, ending their 11-year domination of the LKL and finishing the 2021–22 season with the biggest fiasco in team history. Žalgiris finished the season by winning the LKL bronze medal, beating BC Šiauliai in the consolation round in a 4–0 sweep. To add insult to injury, Rytas went on to win the LKL championship. Jankūnas retired after the season and became the sports director of Žalgiris.

==== 2022–23 ====
After the disastrous 2021–22 season, Žalgiris overwent a radical overhaul from the previous season. Coach Maksvytis had signed a long-term deal before the absolutely catastrophic ending in the LKL. Webster, Nebo, Blaževič, Miniotas, Milaknis, Strelnieks, Giffey, and Lauvergne all left the team during the summer. Former team captain Paulius Jankūnas remained, as a sporting director, assisting director Paulius Motiejūnas. Only a handful of players, among the key ones Lekavičius and Ulanovas, named team captain after Jankūnas and who signed long-term extensions, remained with the team. One of the biggest problems of the previous season was settled when Žalgiris signed Keenan Evans as the new point guard for the team. Kevarrius Hayes and former Žalgiris player Laurynas Birutis were signed to replace Lauvergne and Nebo as centers, Rolands Šmits was signed as a replacement for Jankūnas. Tomas Dimša, who had signed with Žalgiris as early as 2020, returned to the team. Dovydas Giedraitis, who played an incredible season with BC Lietkabelis, and who was one of the main reasons Lietkabelis beat Žalgiris the previous season, was bought out of his contract in Spain, where he was signed to Estudiantes Madrid, and was loaned to Lietkabelis by his team, and signed a long-term contract with Žalgiris. However, the biggest signings for Žalgiris, for the summer, were Arnas Butkevičius, Rytas captain and one of the most important parts of the Rytas 2022 LKL championship winning team, and Ignas Brazdeikis – former NBA player, standout in college, and who returned to play in Lithuania, both on the national team and for Žalgiris – for the first time since moving to Canada at a young age. Despite solid additions, the awful performances of the previous season haunted the team; while Žalgiris became an instant favorite to regain the LKL crown, in the Euroleague, the team was not even considered to be anywhere near playoff contention, with many experts predicting last place for Žalgiris in the Euroleague.

Despite this, and the fact that head coach Kazys Maksvytis had only a brief experience in the Euroleague (as head coach for Neptūnas Klaipėda in the 2014–15 season), Žalgiris shocked the Euroleague; led by Evans, Žalgiris fought nearly every team, at home or away, to the deciding seconds, winning most of the matches. Keenan Evans dominated with incredible performances. In December, however, Evans suffered a season-ending achilles tendon injury; at this point, Žalgiris was 9–8 in the first round of the Euroleague, in playoff contention. While many believed this to be the end of Žalgiris's good run in the Euroleague, Žalgiris recovered – signing Isaiah Taylor, as the new point guard to replace Evans, and Achille Polonara, both from Efes – before the second round. Brazdeikis, who finally adjusted to the European game after a difficult first half of the season, became team leader, with Ulanovas, Šmits, Hayes, and, after a time of adjusting, Taylor and Polonara all contributing. Butkevičius quickly became a fan favorite for his amazing defence and his hustle, with the former Rytas captain becoming among the most popular players among Žalgiris fans. Mantas Kalnietis, remaining after disastrous season, ended up retiring in February and moving to back-office work with Žalgiris, mostly with the Žalgiris football team. Žalgiris was 15–15 by the start of April, and made an amazing run to the Euroleague playoffs, capped off with wins over Maccabi Tel Aviv at home and FC Bayern Munich away, to reach the playoffs, as the 7th seed, with a 19–15 record and with wins and point advantage over Fenerbahçe and Baskonia Vitoria. Žalgiris also finished second in attendance, behind KK Partizan, with fans selling out 16 of the 17 home games, starting in October, because of which, the Žalgirio Arena became the host of the Euroleague Final Four tournament. In the Euroleague playoffs, Žalgiris faced off against FC Barcelona, coached by ex-Žalgiris coach Šarūnas Jasikevičius. Despite best efforts, and the fact that Žalgiris had beaten Barcelona in the regular season at home, Barcelona proved too much for Žalgiris, beating them 91–69, 89–81, and 77-66 for a victorious 3–0 sweep. However, the incredible performance of Žalgiris in the Euroleague earned the team a standing ovation in the last game in Kaunas.

Žalgiris won the 2023 edition of the King Mindaugas Cup, their fourth consecutive Cup victory, with Ulanovas once again being named the MVP of the finals. In the LKL, Žalgiris finished first in the regular season, with a win over defending LKL champions BC Rytas in April, and finished with a 28–5 record. In the playoffs, Žalgiris swept BC Nevėžis in the quarterfinals 2–0, to set up a rematch against BC Lietkabelis; this time, Žalgiris beat Lietkabelis 3–1 to avenge the previous season loss, with a satisfying, dominating 95–66 win in Panevėžys in the deciding game. In the LKL finals, Žalgiris faced Rytas, the series going a full five games, with Rytas giving Žalgiris a fight in each game, with Žalgiris beating Rytas in Kaunas, 108-93 and 95–80, but Rytas winning in Vilnius, 94-71 and 69–68, to set up a decisive fifth game in Kaunas. Žalgiris would win the deciding game 97–87, winning the series 3–2, and regaining the LKL championship. Taylor, who scored 32 points in the championship winning game, was named the LKL Finals MVP.

==== 2023–24 ====
After an incredible 2022–23 season, Žalgiris re-signed much of the team. However, Paulius Motiejūnas, club director since 2013, departed the team and headed to become the director of Euroleague Basketball, a move that many had anticipated during the 2023 season. Paulius Jankūnas took over as club director, in addition to being the sporting director. With Keenan Evans returning from injury, Žalgiris also made an unpopular decision not to re-sign Isaiah Taylor, the MVP of the LKL finals and Žalgiris leader during the victorious series against Rytas. Among other departing players, Tyler Cavanaugh and Karolis Lukošiūnas left during the summer. To replace Taylor, Žalgiris signed Naz Mitrou-Long to the point guard position and also signed Brady Manek, former NCAA standout, to a contract to replace the departed Cavanaugh. With much of the younger Žalgiris players, in particular Motiejus Krivas, departing to the NCAA, Žalgiris also signed Danielius Lavrinovičius, fresh off his career-best season with BC Nevėžis, to a contract.

With what seemed as solid additions during the summer, as well as keeping much of the same roster as the previous 2023 season, Žalgiris looked to continue where they left off the previous season. At the start of the season, however, Žalgiris suffered a massive blow as team leader Ignas Brazdeikis was bought out by Olympiakos Piraeus; the move became even more haunting when Žalgiris decided not to immediately search for Brazdeikis's replacement. Despite the departure by Brazdeikis, Žalgiris started the season strong, being undefeated in the LKL and 3–1 in the Euroleague, sparked by the incredible return to form by Keenan Evans. However, by October, the bottom fell out; struggling even in the LKL, Žalgiris completely fell apart in the Euroleague, going into the second round of the Euroleague with a disastrous 2-11 finish in the first. Mitrou-Long struggled as point guard, and by November, was also bought out by Olympiakos. The eventual replacement for Brazdeikis, Edmond Sumner, played too inconsistently to make any difference. Injuries hurt the team, in particular an injury to Arnas Butkevičius, one of Žalgiris top defensive players; his brief replacement, Austin Hollins, had a forgettable stint with Žalgiris. Rumours of Andrea Trinchieri coming in to replace coach Maksvytis began as early as December, followed by a reported player mutiny which resulted in Maksvytis remaining with Žalgiris for the time being. However, the tragic finish in the Euroleague first round, with a 5–12 record, resulted in Žalgiris and Maksvytis mutually parting ways by the end of December; and coach Trinchieri was brought in to replace him.

Under Trinchieri, Žalgiris had a ressurgence; in the second round of the Euroleague, Žalgiris returned to playoff contention, and fought for the final spot of the Euroleague Play-In tournament all the way to April. Laurynas Birutis became one of the best players for Žalgiris, completely overshadowing Kevarrius Hayes and taking over as starting center, and Dovydas Giedraitis became one of the best defensive players, not just for Žalgiris, but in the whole Euroleague. Led by Evans, Žalgiris fought until April for a spot in the Play-In tournament, before an away loss to AS Monaco ended their hopes for Euroleague playoffs. Under Trinchieri, Žalgiris finished with a 9–8 record, going 14–20 overall – overall, a disappointment, after the previous year playoff year. Keenan Evans had incredible performances all season, establishing himself as one of the top guards of the Euroleague.

Žalgiris also won the 2024 King Mindaugas Cup, held in Kaunas, beating BC Wolves in the quarterfinals, BC Šiauliai in the semifinals, and BC Lietkabelis (who had eliminated BC Rytas in the semifinals) in the finals. Laurynas Birutis was named the tournament MVP. In the LKL, for most of the season, Žalgiris dominated, sweeping Rytas in the regular season, to finish with a 26–4 record, with no other team in the LKL coming close to Žalgiris. During the season, it also became clear that Žalgiris greatly relied on Keenan Evans. Žalgiris chose not to search for another point guard after Mitrou-Long departed in November, with only Lekavičius remaining in the spot. Žalgiris also made a dubious decision to re-sign Karolis Lukošiūnas in February, a decision that ended up even more questionable when Lukošiūnas, after playing a few games, was out for the whole season by the end of March. Before the end of the transfer table in the LKL, Žalgiris also signed Demetrie Rivers; while Rivers had some good games for Žalgiris in the LKL, he barely saw any playing time by the playoffs. In the playoffs, Žalgiris beat M-Basket Delamode Mažeikiai 2–0 in the quarterfinals. The semifinals, against BC Lietkabelis, was a nightmare; in the deciding game of the victorious 3-0 Žalgiris sweep to set up a rematch against Rytas, Evans suffered a season-ending injury by rupturing his patellar ligaments. Without Evans, Žalgiris fell apart. With nobody stepping up for Žalgiris in the finals, Rytas took advantage, taking home-court advantage away from Žalgiris, and finishing off the still shocked Žalgiris 3–1 in the LKL finals to regain the LKL title, while ending the already difficult season for Žalgiris in a complete disaster. This win by Rytas over Žalgiris is considered the biggest upset in LKL history.

==== 2024–25 ====
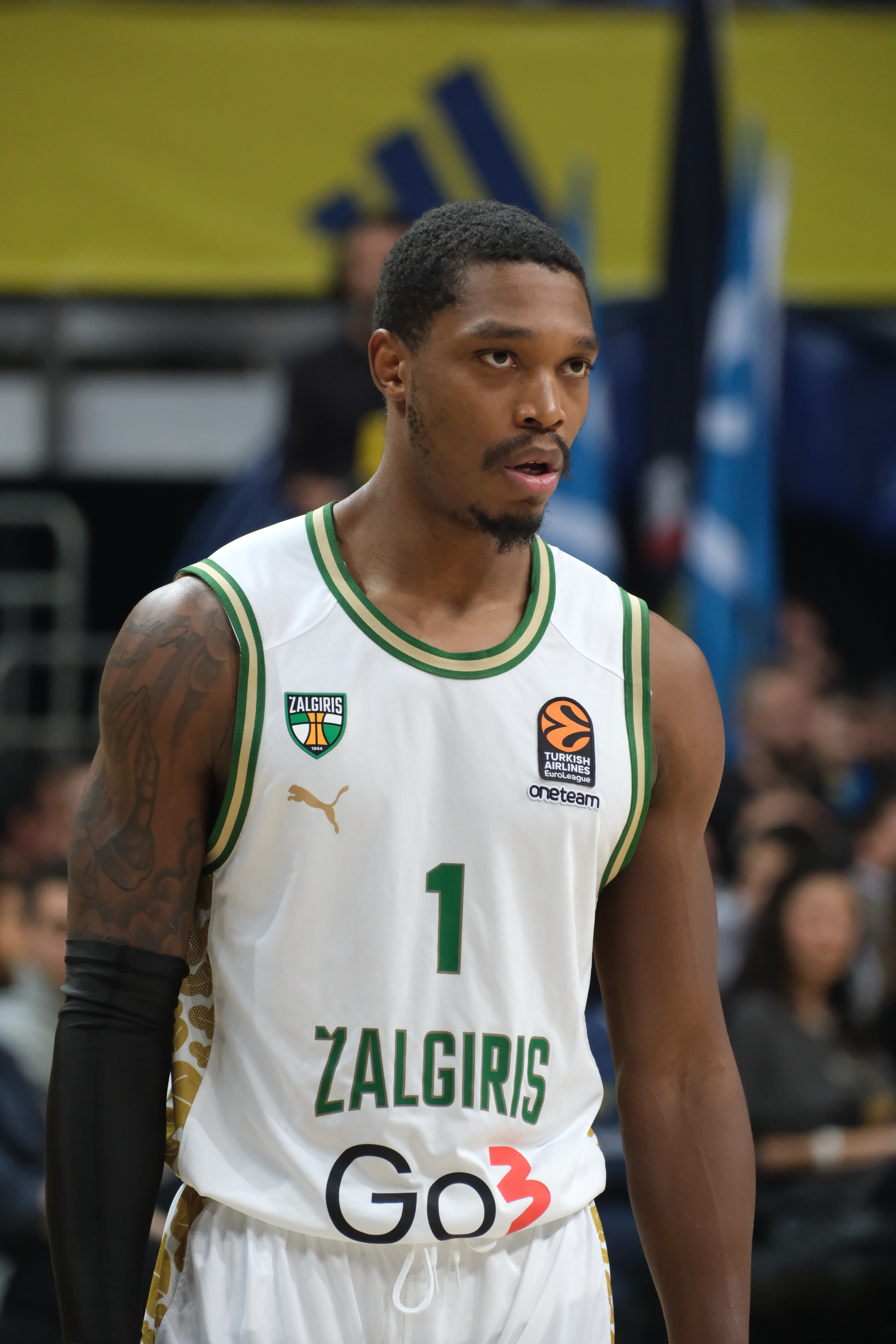
Lonnie Walker IV, 2025.

With the previous season's fiasco behind, Žalgiris started to rebuild the team. Evans left to sign with Olympiakos Piraeus - a move he was linked even before his serious injury in the LKL playoffs. Šmits, Rivers, Sumner, Lavrinovičius, Lukošiūnas, Montvilas and Hayes all left Žalgiris during the summer, while Giedraitis, Ulanovas, Butkevičius, Dimša (injured for the start of the season), Lekavičius, Manek (coming off a very disappointing performance in the LKL playoffs) and Birutis (re-signed during the previous season) remained with Žalgiris. Coach Trinchieri remained with Žalgiris, re-signed to a new long-term contract. Žalgiris signed point guards Sylvain Francisco and Tyrone Wallace, one of the top point guards in the EuroCup, to solve the point guard issue, as Žalgiris struggled without Evans, Deividas Sirvydis, former Rytas and Lietkabelis player and leading scorer of the EuroCup and the returning Ignas Brazdeikis (released by Olympiakos to sign back with Žalgiris) to greatly improve the scoring - another issue as Žalgiris struggled without Evans leading. Žalgiris signed forward Alen Smailagić to replace Šmits, who struggled playing under Trinchieri. To solve defensive vows, particularly in the paint, Žalgiris signed small forward Matt Mitchell, one of the best defensive players in the EuroCup, and the 38 year old Bryant Dunston, former Olympiakos and Efes star, who replaced Hayes, a move that surprised the experts.

Žalgiris started the new season strong - led by Francsico, also by the rapidly improving Giedraitis, stronger games from Sirvydis and Brazdeikis - Žalgirs started the Euroleague season with a 6–1 record - including wins over Barcelona, a 27-point comeback against Armani in Milano, Zvezda and Monaco - even without Wallace (who left Žalgiris due to personal reasons after just two Euroleague games and was later bought out by Galatasaray). Things were only looking up, as Žalgiris signed guard Lonnie Walker IV, a huge free agent even in the NBA, with many predicting that Žalgiris may even fight for the home-court advantage in the Euroleague. The move, however, greatly backfired for Žalgiris - Žalgiris went just 6–13 with Walker at the team. Walker was bought out at the end of February, 2025, by the NBA's Philadelphia 76ers. Both Žalgiris and coach Trinchieri, who constantly clashed with the journalists, were criticized by the media, for the team's lack of identity, strange rotations (including benching of both Sirvydis and Brazdeikis in multiple games), lack of strong center as both Birutis and Dunston rarely performed up to expectations, and greatly relying the team's offense on either Walker, or Francisco. Manek and Mitchell also had struggles, with both falling out of the Žalgiris rotation by the middle of the year, with Manek and Dimša (who was out injured since the summer, but had recovered by the spring time) leaving Žalgiris in April. Even new signing, point guard Isaiah Wong, who sparked Žalgiris in some wins, saw rare playing time under Trinchieri. While Žalgiris still made a push for the Play-In tournament, a 1-4 finish saw Žalgiris finishing the Euroleague with a heavily disappointing 15–19 record and out of the playoffs entirely.

In the King Mindaugas Cup, Žalgiris defeated BC Šiauliai in the quarterfinals, and in the Final Four tournament, held in Vilnius, 7-bet Lietkabelis in the semifinals. In the finals, Žalgirs faced off surprise team BC Neptūnas, who had eliminated both hosts Rytas and Wolves-Twinsbet in the previous rounds. Žalgiris, erasing a double-digit deficit, defeated Neptūnas 91–89 in the finals, in a thriller to win the tournament, with Brazdeikis being named the MVP of the tournament.

In the LKL, Žalgiris dominated the regular season with a 34–2 record, a 30-game winning streak to close out the regular season, and five wins above rivals and reigning LKL champions BC Rytas. In the playoffs, Žalgiris beat, this time convincingly, Neptūnas 2–0 in the quarterfinals, and CBet Jonava 3–0 in the semifinals, to reach the LKL finals against Rytas.

In the LKL finals, Žalgiris were considered favorites - so much, that only a few experts thought Rytas would even win a game in the series - Rytas started the finals actually beating Žalgiris with a double-overtime 97–89 win in Kaunas - ending the 35 game win streak of Žalgiris in the LKL. Žalgiris fought right back with a 83–79 win in Vilnius, tying the series 1-1. Rytas again beat Žalgiris 86–80 in Kaunas - first time that Žalgiris lost two consecutive games in the LKL in the Žalgirio arena - to regain the series lead - the result was not actually indicting of the game, as Rytas dominated and only by the end did Žalgiris cut down the lead. In Vilnius, it looked like a storybook ending for Rytas - one win away from a championship, a sellout crowd of rowdy Rytas fans, and a double digit lead going into the fourth quarter - by the end of the game, in large part due to Francisco and Brazdeikis, the lead was cut to two - in the deciding seconds, Rytas missed a clutch free-throw, and in one of the most iconic plays in LKL history, Francisco made a buzzer-beating three pointer to give Žalgiris the 84–83 win and tying the series 2-2. In the deciding game, in Žalgirio arena, Žalgiris won 76–67, to beat Rytas 3–2 in the series - and regaining the LKL championship. Francisco was named the MVP of the finals.

==== 2025–26 ====
Days after regaining the LKL title, Žalgiris made the decision to part ways with coach Trinchieri and replace him with long-time Žalgiris player and assistant under Jasikevičius, Tomas Masiulis. While a mildly surprising decision, as Žalgiris won back the LKL championship, internal conflicts between management and Trinchieri were reasons for his departure. Dunston, Mitchell, Smailagić, Wong and long-time player Lekavičius all departed Žalgiris during the summer. With increasing finances, Žalgiris built one of the strongest Žalgiris rosters in club history - Nigel Williams-Goss was signed as the new Žalgiris point guard with the biggest contract in team history, as well as Maodo Lô, who could play in the point and shooting guard positions - to help Francisco at the guard position. Moses Wright was signed as the new Žalgiris center. Dustin Sleva was signed to help the front-court. The most surprising signing became Ąžuolas Tubelis from rivals Rytas, who replaced Smailagić - a move that caused controversy as Tubelis was the most hated player for the Žalgiris ultra support group, the Green White Boys, for past incidents. Žalgiris also re-signed one of the team leaders, Sirvydis and Brazdeikis, to new contracts during the off-season. Francisco, the leader of Žalgiris, re-signed during the previous season. He remained with Žalgiris during the summer.

The new season for Žalgiris started with some controversy, as Green White Boys boycotted the start due to Žalgiris signing Tubelis - the conflict ended just before the first Euroleague home game. Initially, questions were raised if Francisco could co-exist with Williams-Goss at the guard position - the questions were answered when Žalgiris opened the Euroleague with a 7-2 start - including back-to-back wins over AS Monaco, the finalists of the Euroleague, and Fenerbahçe, the Euroleague champions and Masiulis former team, coached by Šarūnas Jasikevičius - and never looked back. Even with some struggles - both on-court and off-court - were settled and Žalgiris continued to impress. Francisco became a leading candidate to win the Euroleague MVP award. Wins against giants Olympiacos, Real Madrid, FC Barcelona, the sweeps of elites Monaco, Fenerbahçe and Eurocup champions Hapoel Tel Aviv helped Žalgiris finish 5th with the a 23-15 record - both the best ever for Žalgiris in the Euroleague. In the playoffs, Žalgiris once again faced Jasikevičius - this time, his defending champion Fenerbahçe - who Žalgiris had swept in the regular season. In the playoffs, a much more improved Fenerbahçe proved too much for Žalgiris, winning the series 3-1. Francisco, playing his career year, finished second in the MVP voting, thriving playing at shooting guard while Williams-Goss took over at point guard. Wright, Tubelis and Sleva became one of the strongest front courts in the Euroleague. Lô, Butkevičius, Brazdeikis, Sirvydis, Birutis all made positive contributions for Žalgiris during the year. Tomas Masiulis finished second in the Euroleague Coach of the Year voting.

Žalgiris won the 2026 edition of the King Mindaugas Cup, easily winning against Jonava Hipocredit in the quarterfinals, Neptūnas Klaipėda in the semifinals and rivals Rytas Vilnius in the finals, with Wright winning the finals MVP award.

The LKL became a formality. Žalgiris finished with a 31-1 record in the regular season, having an 11 win edge over second place Rytas. So dominant was Žalgiris, that they managed to beat Rytas, the winners of the Basketball Champions League, without registering Francisco, Wright, Tubelis or Williams-Goss during the final regular season matchup between the two rivals. Birutis, Ulanovas, Brazdeikis, Sirvydis, Mantas Rubštavičius and Dovydas Giedraitis earned more minutes and had a much more important role in the LKL. In the LKL playoffs, Žalgiris easily beat Jonava Hipocredit in the quarterfinals, 2-0, and Lietkabelis Panevėžys, 3-0, in the semifinals. In the finals, Žalgiris faced Juventus Utena, who had went on a miracle run and shocked Rytas in the quarterfinals and Neptūnas in the semifinals. Žalgiris dominated the finals, winning with a 27 point average, to defeat Juventus 3-0 in the finals. Tubelis won the LKL Finals MVP award.

== Players ==
=== Current roster ===
Note: Flags indicate national team eligibility at FIBA-sanctioned events. Players may hold other non-FIBA nationalities not displayed.

Žalgiris roster
Players
Coaches

Pos.	No.	Nat.	Name	Ht.	Wt.	Age
G/F	0	(United States)	Brown, Sterling	1.96 m (6 ft 5 in)	99 kg (218 lb)	31 – 10 February 1995
PG	1	(United States)	Williams-Goss, Nigel (injured)	1.91 m (6 ft 3 in)	87 kg (192 lb)	32 – 16 September 1994
C	2	(Nigeria)	Akobundu-Ehiogu, Kaodirichi	2.08 m (6 ft 10 in)	110 kg (243 lb)	27 – 7 October 1999
SG	3	(United States)	Edwards, Carsen	1.84 m (6 ft 0 in)	91 kg (201 lb)	28 – 12 March 1998
PG	7	(United States)	Lee, Saben	1.88 m (6 ft 2 in)	83 kg (183 lb)	28 – 23 June 1998
PG	9	(Lithuania)	Giedraitis, Dovydas	1.93 m (6 ft 4 in)	93 kg (205 lb)	26 – 17 August 2000
F/C	10	(Lithuania)	Tubelis, Ąžuolas	2.09 m (6 ft 10 in)	111 kg (245 lb)	24 – 22 March 2002
G	12	(Germany)	Lô, Maodo	1.92 m (6 ft 4 in)	82 kg (181 lb)	33 – 31 December 1992
F/C	14	(United States)	Sleva, Dustin	2.03 m (6 ft 8 in)	102 kg (225 lb)	31 – 23 September 1995
C	17	(Lithuania)	Valančiūnas, Jonas	2.15 m (7 ft 1 in)	120 kg (265 lb)	34 – 6 May 1992
SG	21	(Lithuania)	Bulanovas, Majus	1.96 m (6 ft 5 in)	82 kg (181 lb)	19 – 15 May 2007
C	22	(Lithuania)	Blaževič, Marek	2.13 m (7 ft 0 in)	114 kg (251 lb)	25 – 1 September 2001
G	34	(United States)	Evans, Keenan	1.91 m (6 ft 3 in)	86 kg (190 lb)	30 – 23 August 1996
G/F	40	(Lithuania)	Grigonis, Marius	2.02 m (6 ft 8 in)	93 kg (205 lb)	32 – 26 April 1994
F	51	(Lithuania)	Butkevičius, Arnas	1.97 m (6 ft 6 in)	95 kg (209 lb)	33 – 22 November 1992
G/F	91	(Lithuania)	Sirvydis, Deividas	2.04 m (6 ft 8 in)	94 kg (207 lb)	26 – 10 June 2000
F	92	(Lithuania)	Ulanovas, Edgaras (C)	1.98 m (6 ft 6 in)	99 kg (218 lb)	34 – 7 January 1992

Head coach

- (Lithuania) Tomas Masiulis

Assistant coach(es)

- (Lithuania) Mantas Šernius
- (Lithuania) Renaldas Seibutis
- (Lithuania) Andrius Ulčickas
- (Denmark) Johs Andersen

Athletic trainer(s)

- (Lithuania) Žygimantas Janavičius
- (Lithuania) Justinas Grainys
- (Lithuania) Nerijus Navickas
- (Lithuania) Arnas Ikamas

Doctor(s)

- (Lithuania) Vytautas Kailius
- (Lithuania) Andrius Aukštakalnis

Physiotherapist(s)

- (Lithuania) Romas Petraitis

Legend

- (C) Team captain
- Injured

- Roster

=== EuroLeague Depth chart ===
Pos.	Starting 5	Bench 1	Bench 2	Bench 3	Inactive
C	Jonas Valančiūnas	Dustin Sleva	Kaodirichi Akobundu-Ehiogu	Marek Blaževič
PF	Ąžuolas Tubelis	Edgaras Ulanovas
SF	Arnas Butkevičius	Sterling Brown		Deividas Sirvydis
SG	Carsen Edwards	Marius Grigonis		Majus Bulanovas
PG	Keenan Evans	Saben Lee	Maodo Lô	Dovydas Giedraitis	Nigel Williams-Goss (injured)

=== LKL Depth chart ===
Pos.	Starting 5	Bench 1	Bench 2	Bench 3	Inactive
C	Marek Blaževič	Kaodirichi Akobundu-Ehiogu*	Ąžuolas Tubelis	Jonas Valančiūnas
PF	Dustin Sleva*	Edgaras Ulanovas		Arnas Butkevičius
SF	Deividas Sirvydis	Sterling Brown*		Marius Grigonis
SG	Dovydas Giedraitis	Carsen Edwards*	Majus Bulanovas
PG	Maodo Lô*	Saben Lee*		Keenan Evans*	Nigel Williams-Goss* (injured)

- In the LKL, official rules govern game-day rosters, import/foreign player limits, and registration guidelines rather than a fixed on-court substitution rotation. Up to 12 players can be listed on the official score sheet/roster for a single game. Clubs are permitted to register up to 6 non-Lithuanian players per match.

Foreign players are shown with an asterisk (*).

=== Loaned out ===
No.	Pos.	Nat.	Name	Moving to		Type	Date	Source
	SF	(United States)	Maxwell Lewis	London Lions	(United Kingdom)	Out on loan	17 June 2026	
	SG	(Lithuania)	Mantas Rubštavičius	Tofaş	(Turkey)	Out on loan	9 November 2026	
	PG	(Lithuania)	Dominykas Grunkis	London Lions	(United Kingdom)	Out on loan	15 November 2026	

=== Squad changes for 2026–27 season ===
==== In ====
No.	Pos.	Nat.	Name	Moving from		Type	Date	Source
2	C	(Nigeria)	Kaodirichi Akobundu-Ehiogu	Manresa	(Spain)	Transfer	2 August 2026	
3	SG	(United States)	Carsen Edwards	Virtus Bologna	(Italy)	End of contract	20 June 2026	
7	G	(United States)	Saben Lee	Anadolu Efes	(Turkey)	End of contract	16 June 2026	
0	G/F	(United States)	Sterling Brown	Partizan	(Serbia)	Transfer	7 July 2026	
17	C	(Lithuania)	Jonas Valančiūnas	Denver Nuggets	(United States)	End of contract	15 July 2026	
22	C	(Lithuania)	Marek Blaževič	Tofaş	(Turkey)	End of contract	19 June 2026	
40	G/F	(Lithuania)	Marius Grigonis	Panathinaikos	(Greece)	Parted ways	20 June 2026	
34	G	(United States)	Keenan Evans	London Lions	(United Kingdom)	Recalled off loan	23 October 2026	

==== Out ====
No.	Pos.	Nat.	Name	Moving to		Type	Date	Source
3	PG	(France) (United States)	Sylvain Francisco	Panathinaikos	(Greece)	Buyout	1 July 2026	
7	C	(United States)	Moses Wright	Olimpia Milano	(Italy)	End of contract	18 June 2026	
8	F	(Canada) (Lithuania)	Ignas Brazdeikis	Unicaja Málaga	(Spain)	End of contract	18 June 2026	
15	C	(Lithuania)	Laurynas Birutis	Basket Zaragoza	(Spain)	End of contract	18 June 2026	
17	SG	(Lithuania)	Mantas Rubštavičius	Auburn Tigers	(United States)	End of contract	15 June 2026	

=== Retired numbers ===
Žalgiris retired numbers
No	Nat.	Player	Position	Tenure	Ceremony date
5	(Lithuania)	Modestas Paulauskas	SF	1962–1976	25 March 2015
11	(Lithuania)	Arvydas Sabonis	C	1981–1989, 2001–2002, 2003–2005	27 September 2014
13	(Lithuania)	Paulius Jankūnas	PF	2003–2009, 2010–2022	18 October 2022
Nat.		Coach		Tenure	Ceremony date
(Lithuania)		Vladas Garastas		1979–1989	23 April 2017
(Lithuania)		Jonas Kazlauskas		1994–2000	23 April 2019

=== Players in the NBA draft ===
^{#}	Denotes player who has never appeared in an NBA regular-season or playoff game

Position	Player	Year	Round	Pick	Drafted by
C	(Lithuania) Arvydas Sabonis	1986	1st round	24th	Portland Trail Blazers
C	(Lithuania) Martynas Andriuškevičius	2005	2nd round	44th	Orlando Magic, traded to Cleveland Cavaliers
PF/C	(Lithuania) Artūras Gudaitis^{#}	2015	2nd round	47th	Philadelphia 76ers
PF/C	(Germany) Isaiah Hartenstein	2017	2nd round	43rd	Houston Rockets
PG/SG	(Lithuania) Rokas Jokubaitis^{#}	2021	2nd round	34th	Oklahoma City Thunder, traded to New York Knicks

=== Team captains ===
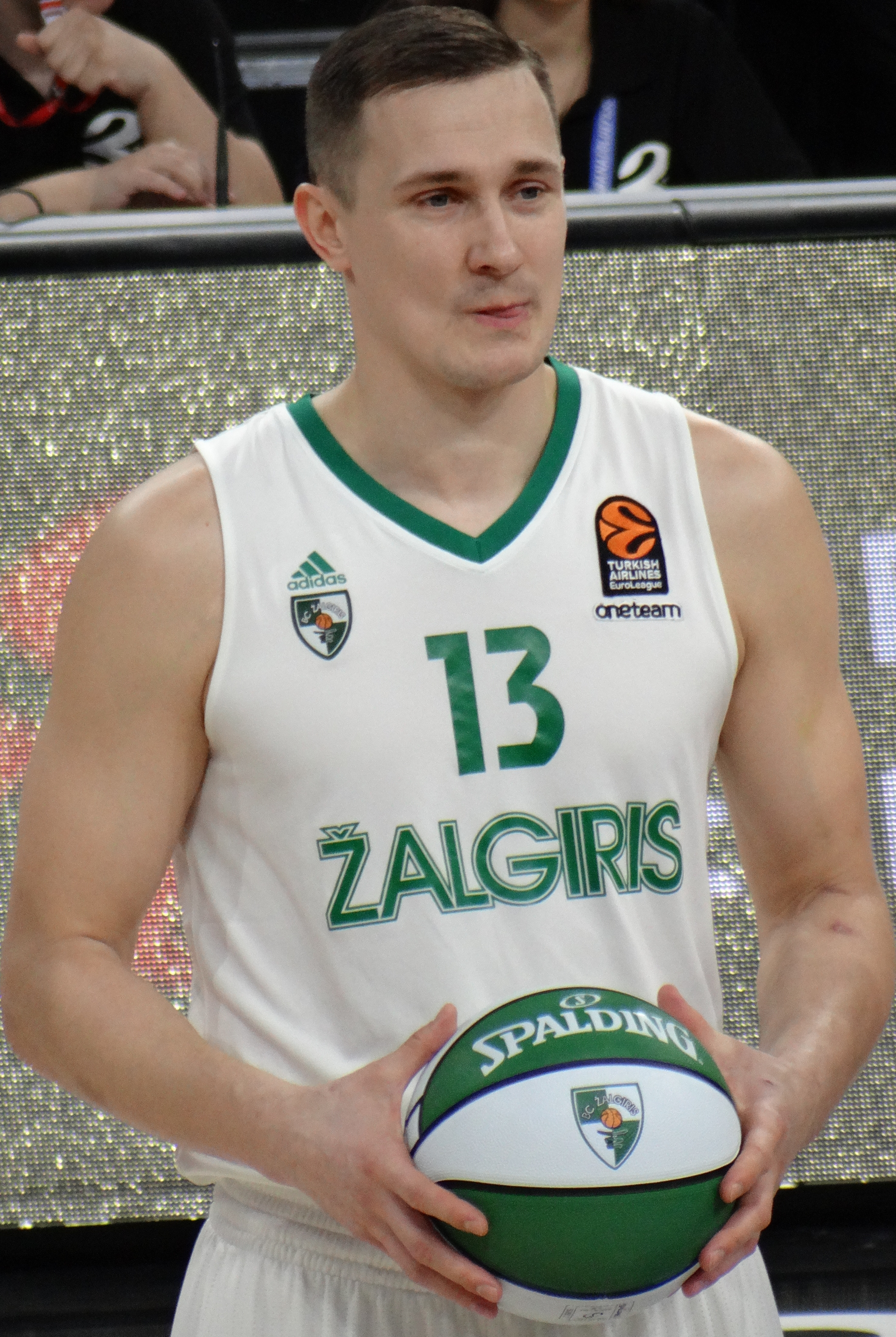
Paulius Jankūnas

- (Lithuania) Mykolas Ziminskas (1944–)
- (Lithuania) Stepas Butautas (1950s)
- (Lithuania) Jonas Radykas (1957–1963)
- (Lithuania) Henrikas Giedraitis (1964–1972)
- (Lithuania) Modestas Paulauskas (1972–1976)
- (Lithuania) Jonas Jurkšaitis (1976–1979)
- (Lithuania) Mindaugas Arlauskas (1980–1984)
- (Lithuania) Valdemaras Chomičius (1984?–1989)
- (Lithuania) Gintaras Krapikas (1989–1990)
- (Lithuania) Algirdas Brazys (1990–1991)
- (Lithuania) Darius Lukminas (1991–1994)
- (Lithuania) Gintaras Einikis (1994–1995)
- (Lithuania) Rimas Kurtinaitis (1995–1996)
- (Lithuania) Darius Maskoliūnas (1996–1999)
- (Lithuania) Tomas Masiulis (1999–2002)
- (United States) Steve Woodberry (2002)
- (Lithuania) Mindaugas Timinskas (2002–2005)
- (United States) Tanoka Beard (2005–2007)
- (Lithuania) Eurelijus Žukauskas (2007–2008)
- (Lithuania) Paulius Jankūnas (2008–2009)
- (Lithuania) Dainius Šalenga (2009–2010)
- (Lithuania) Paulius Jankūnas (2010–2022)
- (Lithuania) Edgaras Ulanovas (2022–present)

== Honours and other achievements ==
At the team's inception in 1944, when Lithuania was a Soviet Socialist Republic, Žalgiris began competing in both the Soviet Union National League and the domestic Lithuanian SSR League. When the country declared independence from the USSR in 1991 and the Soviet League folded, Žalgiris competed in the Lithuanian League (a successor of the Lithuanian SSR League) for two years before the newly reinstated Lithuanian Basketball Federation (LKF) established the Lithuanian Basketball League (LKL) as the country's premier basketball league in 1993, with Žalgiris as a founding member.

In 2007, the LKF established the LKF Cup (Lietuvos Krepšinio Federacijos Taurė) as an annual tournament for domestic clubs. Before 2007, the LKF Cup had been held twice—once in 1989–90 and once in 1997–89. It was replaced in 2016 by the King Mindaugas Cup, a mid-season tournament for LKL teams that runs from October to February.

Honours
Type	Competition	Titles	Seasons
International	EuroLeague	1	1998–99
International	FIBA Saporta Cup	1	1997–98
International	FIBA Intercontinental Cup	1	1986
Domestic	Soviet Union League	5	1947, 1951, 1985, 1986, 1987
Domestic	Lithuanian SSR League	8	1946, 1950, 1952, 1953, 1954, 1955, 1957, 1958
Domestic	Lithuanian League	3	1991, 1992, 1993
Domestic	Lithuanian League	26	1994, 1995, 1996, 1997, 1998, 1999, 2001, 2003, 2004, 2005, 2007, 2008, 2011, 2012, 2013, 2014, 2015, 2016, 2017, 2018, 2019, 2020, 2021, 2023, 2025, 2026
Domestic	Soviet Union Cup	1	1953
Domestic	Lithuanian Cup	5	1990, 2007, 2008, 2011, 2012, 2015
Domestic	King Mindaugas Cup	9	2017, 2018, 2020, 2021, 2022, 2023, 2024, 2025, 2026
Regional	NEBL Championship	1	1999
Regional	BBL Championship	5	2005, 2008, 2010, 2011, 2012
Regional	BBL Cup	1	2009

- Record title holders

=== Other Achievements ===
==== International competitions ====
- EuroLeague
  - Runners-up (1): 1985–86
  - Semifinalists (1): 1986–87
  - 3rd place (1): 2017–18
  - Final Four (2): 1999, 2018
- FIBA Saporta Cup
  - Runners-up (1): 1984–85
  - Semifinalists (3): 1988–89, 1989–90, 1995–96

==== Other competitions ====
- Gomelsky Cup

Winners (1): 2008
Runners-up (1): 2010

== Season-by-season ==
Season	League	LKF / KMT Cup	Regional competitions	Europe	Head coach	Roster
1992–93	Champion	No tournament	No tournament	EuroLeague; FIBA EuroLeague 1992–93	Henrikas Giedraitis	Gintaras Einikis, Arvydas Straupis, Gintaras Staniulis, Gintautas Šivickas, Rimas Kurtinaitis, Arūnas Visockas, Saulius Štombergas, Darius Lukminas, Darius Maskoliūnas, Algirdas Brazys, Vaidas Jurgilas, Tauras Stumbrys, Aurimas Tomas Palšis
1993–94	Champion	No tournament	No tournament	FIBA EuroLeague 1993–94 Second round	Jaak Salumets	Gintaras Einikis, Romanas Brazdauskis, Erikas Bublys, Antwon Harmon, Arūnas Visockas, Gert Kullamäe, Darius Lukminas, Gintautas Šivickas, Kęstutis Šeštokas, Darius Maskoliūnas, Algirdas Brazys, Vaidas Jurgilas, Tauras Stumbrys
1994–95	Champion	No tournament	No tournament	1994–95 FIBA European League Second Round	Jonas Kazlauskas	Gintaras Einikis, Kęstutis Šeštokas, Tomas Masiulis, Arūnas Visockas, Nerijus Karlikanovas, Darren Henrie, Darius Lukminas, Marijus Kavoliukas, Mindaugas Lydeka, Darius Maskoliūnas, Algirdas Brazys, Tauras Stumbrys, Michael Coleman
1995–96	Champion	No tournament	No tournament	1995–96 FIBA European Cup Semifinals	Jonas Kazlauskas	Torgeir Bryn, Eurelijus Žukauskas, Joey Hooks, Rimas Kurtinaitis, Kęstutis Šeštokas, Tomas Masiulis, Arūnas Visockas, Miloš Babić, Darius Lukminas, Erikas Bublys, Darius Maskoliūnas, Nerijus Karlikanovas, Tauras Stumbrys, Darius Sirtautas
1996–97	Champion	No tournament	No tournament	EuroCup; Last 16	Jonas Kazlauskas	Franjo Arapović, Tomas Masiulis, Kęstutis Šeštokas, Gintautas Šivickas, Dainius Adomaitis, Erikas Bublys, Darius Maskoliūnas, Anthony Miller, Veljko Mršić, Andre Reid, Tauras Stumbrys, Darius Sirtautas
1997–98	Champion	No tournament	No tournament	EuroCup; Champion	Jonas Kazlauskas	Franjo Arapović, Eurelijus Žukauskas, Mindaugas Žukauskas, Tomas Masiulis, Kęstutis Šeštokas, Saulius Štombergas, Dainius Adomaitis, Virginijus Praškevičius, Darius Maskoliūnas, Ennis Whatley, Tauras Stumbrys, Darius Sirtautas
1998–99	Champion	No tournament	NEBL Champion	EuroLeague; Champion	Jonas Kazlauskas	George Zidek, Eurelijus Žukauskas, Mindaugas Žukauskas, Tomas Masiulis, Kęstutis Šeštokas, Saulius Štombergas, Dainius Adomaitis, Anthony Bowie, Darius Maskoliūnas, Tyus Edney, Giedrius Gustas
1999–00	Finalist	No tournament	–	EuroLeague; Last 24	Jonas Kazlauskas	George Zidek, Eurelijus Žukauskas, Ivan Grgat, Mindaugas Žukauskas, Mindaugas Timinskas, Tauras Stumbrys, Tomas Masiulis, Kęstutis Šeštokas, Donatas Slanina, Darren Henry, Corey Beck, Mitchell Butler, Chris Garner
2000–01	Champion	No tournament	NEBL Finalist	EuroLeague; Last 16	Algirdas Brazys	Grigorij Khizhnyak, Artūras Masiulis, John White, Martynas Andriukaitis, Andrius Jurkūnas, Dainius Šalenga, Tomas Masiulis, Steve Woodberry, Donatas Slanina, Giedrius Gustas, Kęstutis Marčiulionis, Nerijus Karlikanovas, Marius Bašinskas, Vidas Ginevičius
2001–02	Finalist	No tournament	–	EuroLeague; Last 32	Algirdas Brazys	Grigorij Khizhnyak, Artūras Masiulis, Rolandas Matulis, Andrius Jurkūnas, Dainius Šalenga, Tomas Masiulis, Steve Woodberry, Donatas Slanina, Giedrius Gustas, Sherman Hamilton, Kęstutis Marčiulionis, Vidas Ginevičius, Arvydas Sabonis, Martynas Andriukaitis, Kenneth Inge
2002–03	Champion	No tournament	–	EuroLeague; Last 24	Antanas Sireika	Gintaras Einikis, Tanoka Beard, Darius Šilinskis, Artūras Masiulis, Tadas Klimavičius, Saulius Štombergas, Dainius Šalenga, Kornél Dávid, Mindaugas Timinskas, Chris Carrawell, Giedrius Gustas, Ed Cota, Vidas Ginevičius
2003–04	Champion	No tournament	No tournament	EuroLeague; Last 16	Antanas Sireika	Tanoka Beard, Darjuš Lavrinovič, Arvydas Sabonis, Paulius Jankūnas, Artūras Javtokas, Miroslav Beric, Dainius Šalenga, Simonas Serapinas, Mindaugas Timinskas, Ainars Bagatskis, Giedrius Gustas, Ed Cota
2004–05	Champion	No tournament	BBL Champion	EuroLeague; Last 16	Antanas Sireika	Tanoka Beard, Darjuš Lavrinovič, Paulius Jankūnas, Martynas Andriuškevičius, Dainius Šalenga, Simonas Serapinas, Jonas Mačiulis, Mindaugas Timinskas, Ainars Bagatskis, Vidas Ginevičius, Robert Pack, Artūras Javtokas, Arvydas Sabonis, Gediminas Navickas
2005–06	Finalist	No tournament	BBL Finalist	EuroLeague; Last 16	Antanas Sireika	Tanoka Beard, Darjuš Lavrinovič, Paulius Jankūnas, Darius Šilinskis, Reggie Freeman, Simonas Serapinas, Jonas Mačiulis, Mantas Kalnietis, Ed Cota, Vidas Ginevičius, Larry Ayuso, Kenny Anderson, Vilmantas Dilys
2006–07	Champion	Winner	BBL Finalist	EuroLeague; Last 24	Rimantas Grigas	Tanoka Beard, Darius Šilinskis, Hanno Möttölä, Paulius Jankūnas, Marcelo Machado, Kirk Penney, Jonas Mačiulis, Vladimir Štimac, Artūras Milaknis, Mantas Kalnietis, DeJuan Collins, Marko Popović, Vidas Ginevičius, Vaidotas Pečiukas, Vytenis Jasikevičius
2007–08	Champion	Winner	BBL Champion	EuroLeague; Last 16	Rimantas Grigas	Eurelijus Žukauskas, Tanoka Beard, Paulius Jankūnas, Goran Jurak, Dainius Šalenga, Jonas Mačiulis, Marcus Brown, Artūras Milaknis, Mantas Kalnietis, DeJuan Collins, Marko Popović, Damir Markota, Mamadou N'Diaye, Donatas Motiejūnas, Vilmantas Dilys, Žygimantas Janavičius
2008–09	Finalist	Finalist	BBL Finalist	EuroLeague; Last 24	Gintaras Krapikas	Eurelijus Žukauskas, Loren Woods, Paulius Jankūnas, Tomas Masiulis, Tadas Klimavičius, Dainius Šalenga, Jonas Mačiulis, Darius Šilinskis, Artūras Milaknis, Mantas Kalnietis, Vytenis Čižauskas, Šarūnas Vasiliauskas, Žygimantas Janavičius, Ratko Varda, Willie Deane, Rokas Čepanonis
2009–10	Finalist	Finalist	BBL Champion	EuroLeague; Last 16	Marcus Brown	Mirza Begić, Travis Watson, Tadas Klimavičius, Mario Delaš, Dainius Šalenga, Martynas Pocius, Artūras Milaknis, Marcus Brown, Aleksandar Ćapin, Mantas Kalnietis, Siim-Sander Vene, Povilas Butkevičius, Povilas Čukinas, Šarūnas Vasiliauskas, Adas Juškevičius
2010–11	Champion	Winner	BBL Champion	EuroLeague; Last 16	Ilias Zouros	Mirza Begić, Boban Marjanović, Travis Watson, Omar Samhan, Paulius Jankūnas, Tadas Klimavičius, Trent Plaisted, Mindaugas Kuzminskas, Dainius Šalenga, Martynas Pocius, Artūras Milaknis, Marcus Brown, Aleksandar Ćapin, Tomas Delininkaitis, Mantas Kalnietis, DeJuan Collins
2011–12	Champion	Winner	BBL Champion	EuroLeague; Last 16	Aleksandar Trifunović	Robertas Javtokas, Milovan Raković, Paulius Jankūnas, Tadas Klimavičius, Sonny Weems, Mindaugas Kuzminskas, Marko Popović, Tomas Delininkaitis, Mantas Kalnietis, DeJuan Collins, Reeves Nelson, Dainius Šalenga, Vytenis Lipkevičius, Ty Lawson
2012–13	Champion	Super Cup Winner	VTB United League Third place	EuroLeague; Last 16	Joan Plaza	Robertas Javtokas, Paulius Jankūnas, Tadas Klimavičius, Mindaugas Kuzminskas, Marko Popović, Kšyštof Lavrinovič, Darjuš Lavrinovič, Jeff Foote, Mario Delaš, Tremmell Darden, Vytenis Lipkevičius, Rimantas Kaukėnas, Oliver Lafayette, Ibrahim Jaaber, Adas Juškevičius, Donnie McGrath
2013–14	Champion	Third place	Not participated	EuroLeague; Last 16	Saulius Štombergas	Robertas Javtokas, Paulius Jankūnas, Tadas Klimavičius, Martynas Pocius, Justin Dentmon, Kšyštof Lavrinovič, Siim-Sander Vene, Artūras Milaknis, Šarūnas Jasikevičius, Mindaugas Kupšas, Vytenis Lipkevičius, Tauras Jogėla, Tomas Dimša, Kaspars Vecvagars, Vytenis Čižauskas, Artūras Gudaitis
2014–15	Champion	Winner	Not participated	EuroLeague; Last 16	Gintaras Krapikas	Robertas Javtokas, Paulius Jankūnas, Siim-Sander Vene, Artūras Milaknis, Vytenis Lipkevičius, Tomas Dimša, Kaspars Vecvagars, Artūras Gudaitis, Lukas Lekavičius, Donatas Tarolis, Vaidas Kariniauskas, Edgaras Ulanovas, Darius Songaila, James Anderson, Will Cherry
2015–16	Champion	Runner-up	Not participated	EuroLeague; Last 16	Gintaras Krapikas, Šarūnas Jasikevičius	Robertas Javtokas, Paulius Jankūnas, Siim-Sander Vene, Vytenis Lipkevičius, Kaspars Vecvagars, Lukas Lekavičius, Edgaras Ulanovas, Martynas Pocius, Renaldas Seibutis, Olivier Hanlan, Brock Motum, Ian Vougioukas, Martynas Sajus, Jerome Randle, Mantas Kalnietis
2016–17	Champion	Winner	Not participated	EuroLeague; 10th	Šarūnas Jasikevičius	Robertas Javtokas, Paulius Jankūnas, Lukas Lekavičius, Edgaras Ulanovas, Renaldas Seibutis, Brock Motum, Leo Westermann, Kevin Pangos, Augusto Lima, Artūras Milaknis, Antanas Kavaliauskas, Paulius Valinskas, Isaiah Hartenstein, Martynas Varnas, Gytis Masiulis
2017–18	Champion	Winner	Not participated	EuroLeague; Third place	Šarūnas Jasikevičius	Paulius Jankūnas, Edgaras Ulanovas, Kevin Pangos, Artūras Milaknis, Antanas Kavaliauskas, Paulius Valinskas, Gytis Masiulis, Aaron White, Vasilije Micić, Brandon Davies, Dee Bost, Axel Toupane, Martynas Sajus, Martynas Arlauskas, Beno Udrih
2018–19	Champion	Finalist	Not participated	EuroLeague; Quarterfinal	Šarūnas Jasikevičius	Paulius Jankūnas, Edgaras Ulanovas, Artūras Milaknis, Antanas Kavaliauskas, Aaron White, Brandon Davies, Leo Westermann, Nate Wolters, Marius Grigonis, Laurynas Birutis, Thomas Walkup, Donatas Sabeckis, Derrick Walton, Lukas Uleckas, Rokas Jokubaitis, Erikas Venskus
2019–20	Champion (Note: Žalgiris named champion after the premature ending of the league due to the coronavirus pandemic)	Champion	Not participated	EuroLeague; Season suspended	Šarūnas Jasikevičius	Paulius Jankūnas, Edgaras Ulanovas, Artūras Milaknis, Marius Grigonis, Thomas Walkup, Rokas Jokubaitis, Erikas Venskus, Martinas Geben, Nigel Hayes, Jock Landale, Zach LeDay, Lukas Lekavičius, Karolis Lukošiūnas, K.C. Rivers, Alex Pérez, Kerr Kriisa
2020–21	Champion	Champion	Not participated	EuroLeague; 11th	Martin Schiller	Paulius Jankūnas, Artūras Milaknis, Marius Grigonis, Thomas Walkup, Rokas Jokubaitis, Martinas Geben, Nigel Hayes, Lukas Lekavičius, Karolis Lukošiūnas, Marek Blaževič, Patricio Garino, Augustine Rubit, Steve Vasturia, Joffrey Lauvergne, Tomas Dimša
2021–22	Third place	Champion	Not participated	EuroLeague; 15th	Martin Schiller, Jure Zdovc, Kazys Maksvytis	Paulius Jankūnas, Edgaras Ulanovas, Artūras Milaknis, Mantas Kalnietis, Lukas Lekavičius, Karolis Lukošiūnas, Marek Blaževič, Joffrey Lauvergne, Tyler Cavanaugh, Niels Giffey, Josh Nebo, Jānis Strēlnieks, Emmanuel Mudiay, Tai Webster, Zoran Dragić, Regimantas Miniotas, Motiejus Krivas, Titas Sargiūnas
2022–23	Champion	Champion	Not participated	EuroLeague; Quarterfinal	Kazys Maksvytis	Laurynas Birutis, Ignas Brazdeikis, Arnas Butkevičius, Tyler Cavanaugh, Tomas Dimša, Keenan Evans, Dovydas Giedraitis, Kevarrius Hayes, Mantas Kalnietis, Motiejus Krivas, Lukas Lekavičius, Liutauras Lelevičius, Karolis Lukošiūnas, Achille Polonara, Rolands Šmits, Isaiah Taylor, Edgaras Ulanovas
2023–24	Finalist	Champion	Not participated	EuroLeague; 14th	Kazys Maksvytis, Andrea Trinchieri	Laurynas Birutis, Dovydas Butka, Arnas Butkevičius, Tomas Dimša, Keenan Evans, Dovydas Giedraitis, Kevarrius Hayes, Danielius Lavrinovičius, Lukas Lekavičius, Karolis Lukošiūnas, Brady Manek, Nedas Montvila, Demetre Rivers, Rolands Šmits, Edmond Sumner, Edgaras Ulanovas
2024–25	Champion	Champion	Not participated	EuroLeague; 13th	Andrea Trinchieri	Mantas Juzėnas, Isaiah Wong, Sylvain Francisco, Lukas Lekavičius, Ignas Brazdeikis, Dovydas Giedraitis, Laurynas Birutis, Alen Smailagić, Matt Mitchell, Aleksas Bieliauskas, Bryant Dunston, Arnas Butkevičius, Dovydas Buika, Ignas Štombergas, Mantas Laurenčikas, Deividas Sirvydis, Edgaras Ulanovas
2025-26	Champion	Champion	Not participated	EuroLeague; Quarterfinal	Tomas Masiulis	Nigel Williams-Goss, Majus Bulanovas, Sylvain Francisco, Kajus Mikalauskas, Ignas Brazdeikis, Moses Wright,Dovydas Giedraitis, Laurynas Birutis, Ąžuolas Tubelis, Maodo Lô, Dustin Sleva, Ignas Štombergas, Mantas Rubštavičius, Dominykas Daubaris, Arnas Butkevičius, Jokūbas Rudaitis, Deividas Sirvydis, Edgaras Ulanovas

Detailed information of former rosters and results.

== Notable players ==
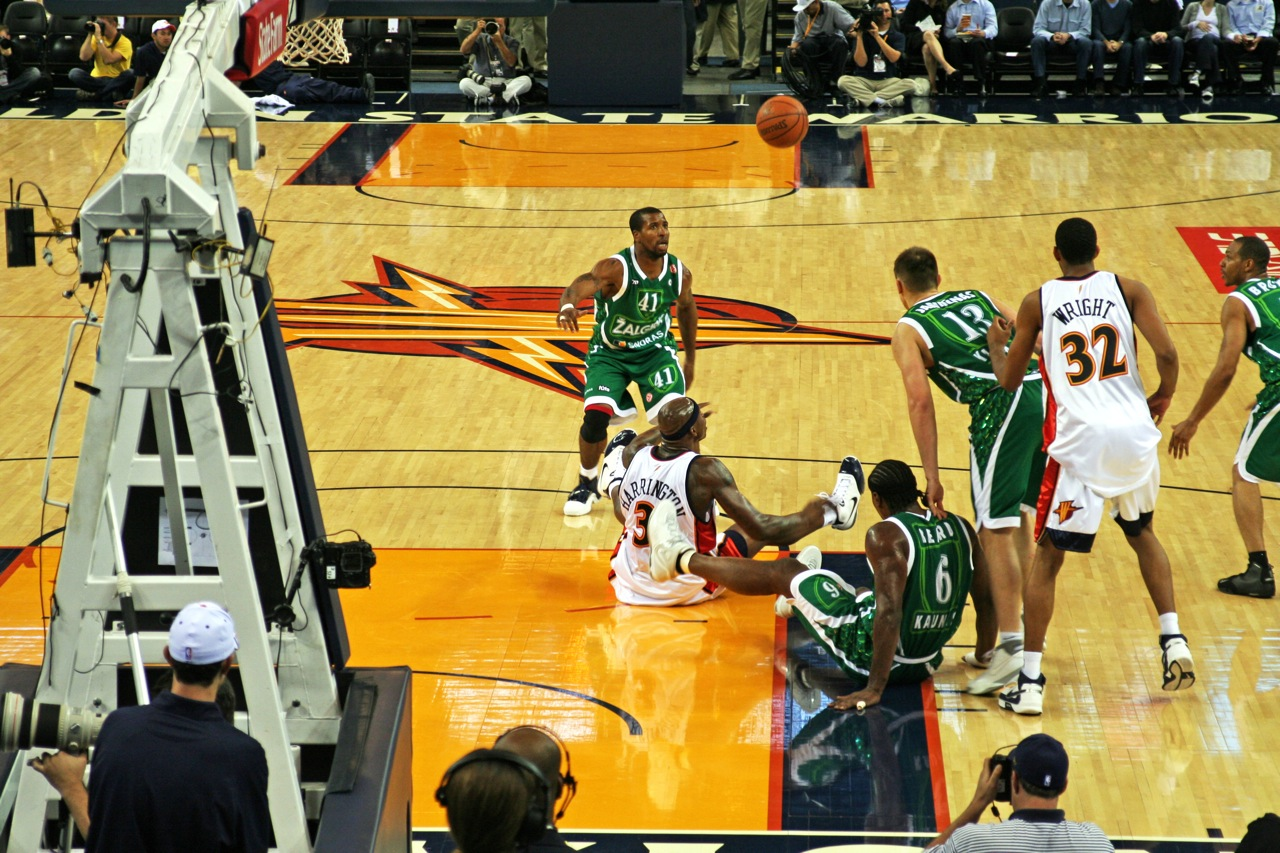
Žalgiris vs. Golden State Warriors in 2007

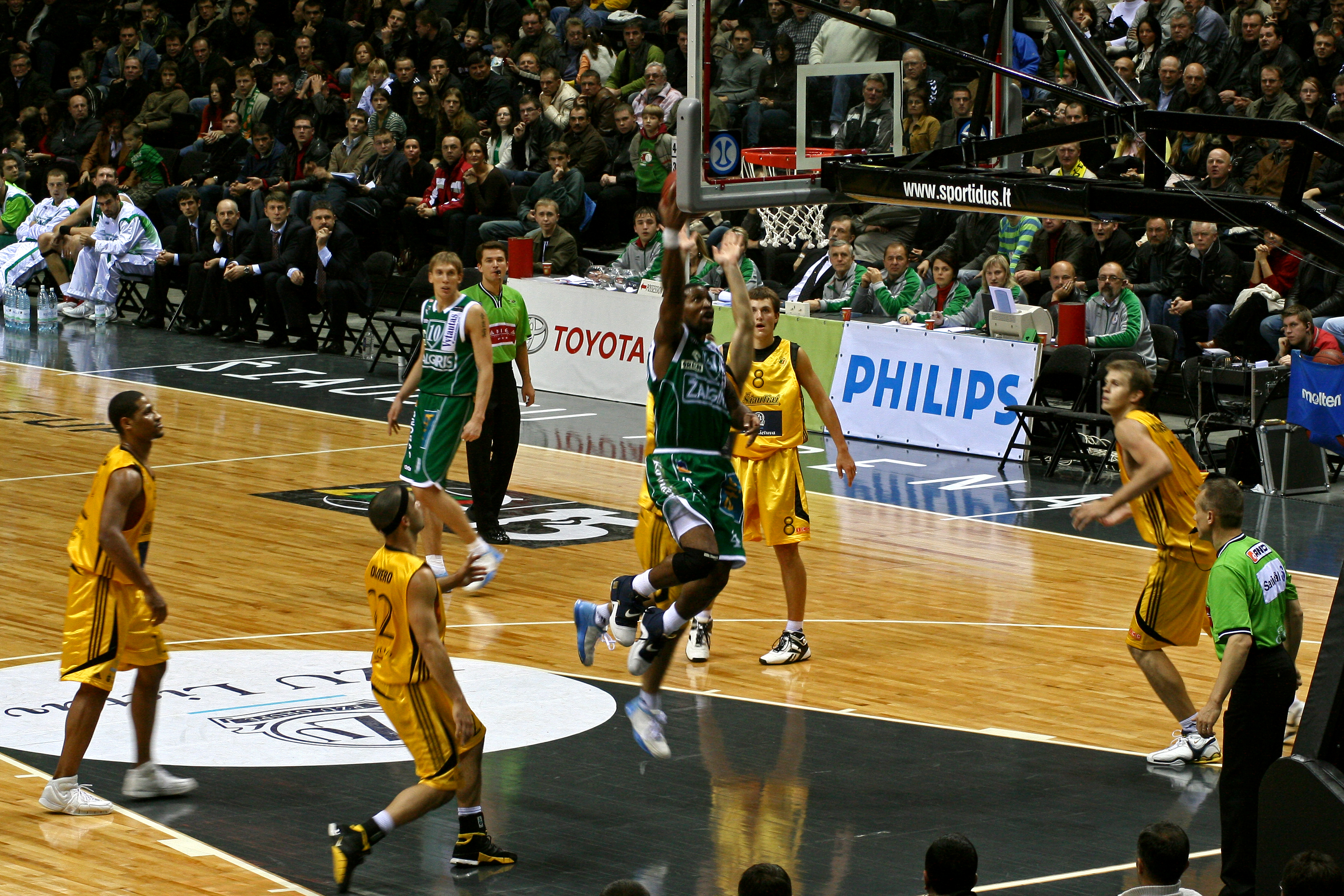
Žalgiris vs. Šiauliai in 2007

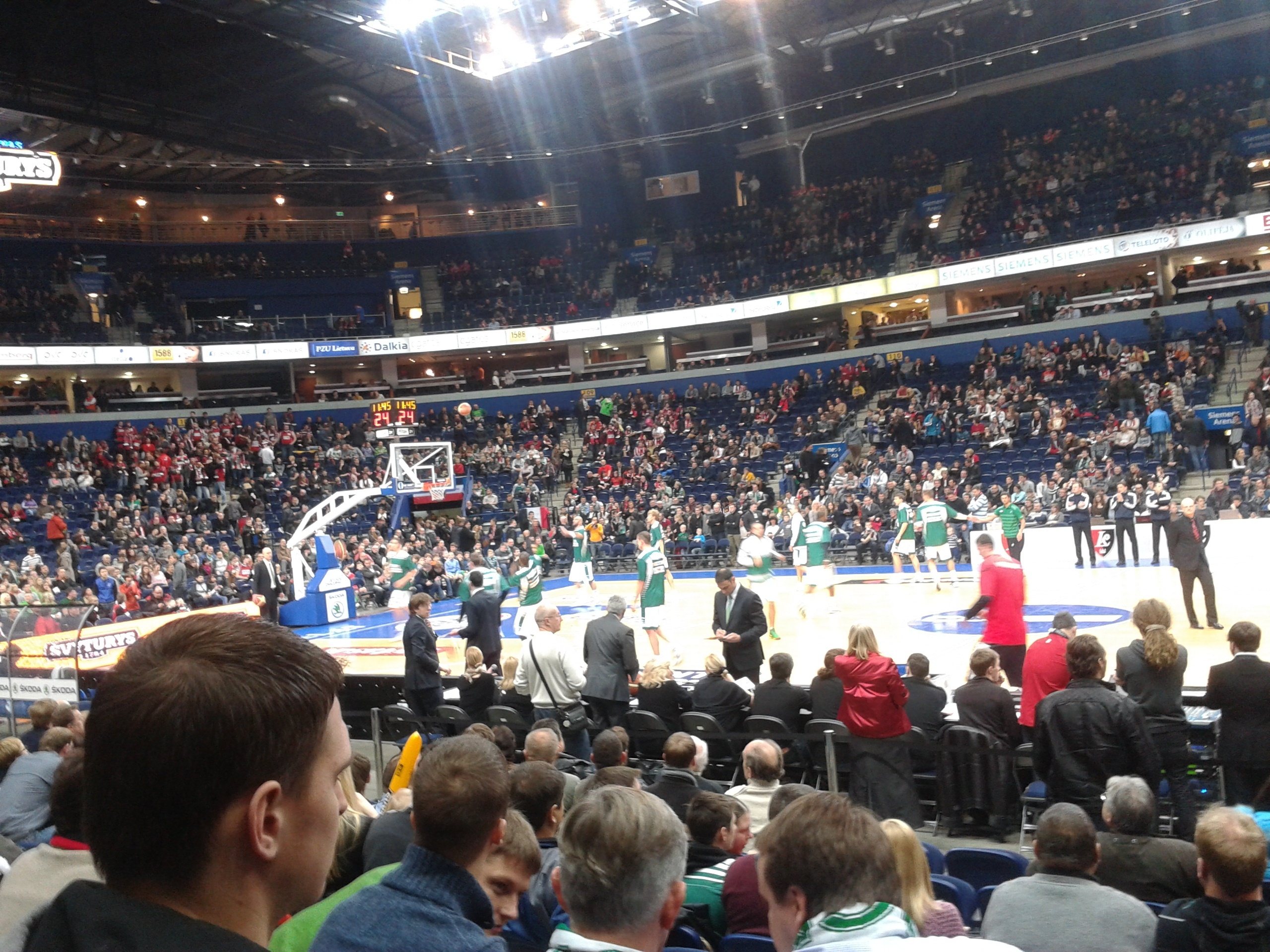
Žalgiris warming up before the game

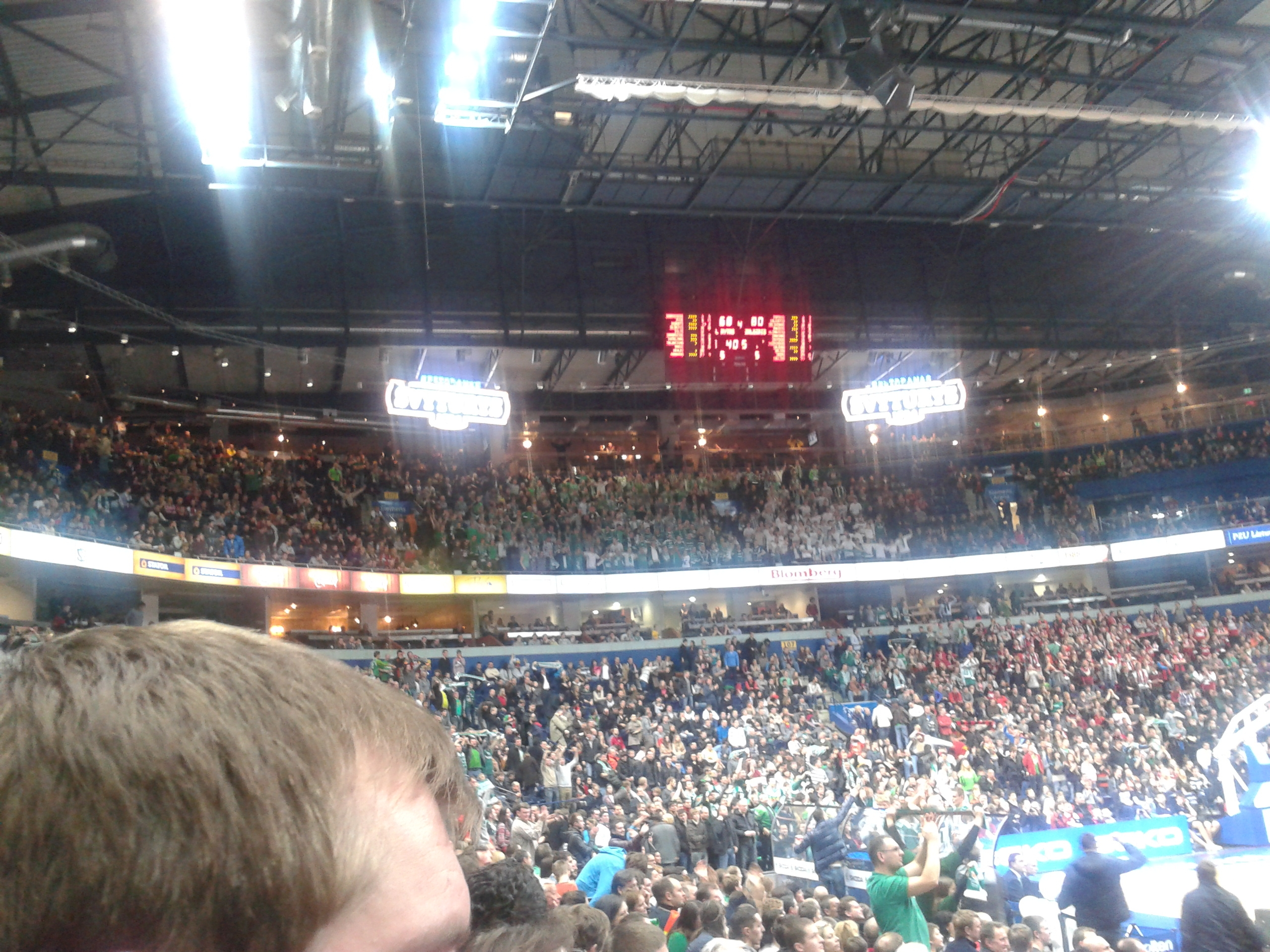
Žalgiris fans during LKL game in Vilnius

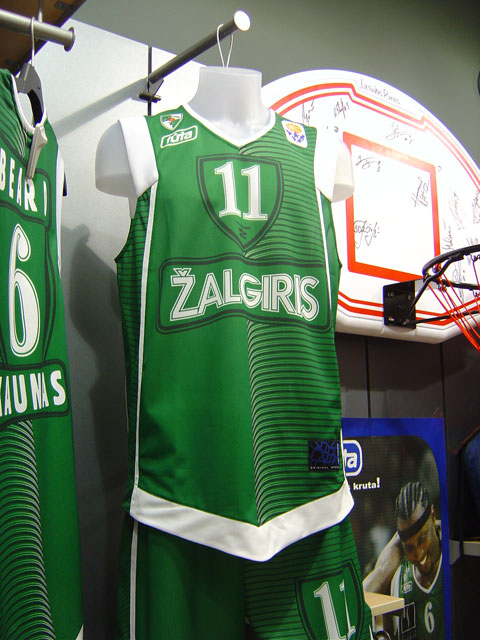
Former Žalgiris jersey

Note: Flags indicate national team eligibility at FIBA-sanctioned events. Players may hold other non-FIBA nationalities not displayed.

Criteria

To appear in this section a player must have either:

- Set a club record or won an individual award while at the club
- Played at least one official international match for their national team at any time
- Played at least one official NBA match at any time.

- (Lithuania) Vytautas Kulakauskas (1944–1949)
- (Lithuania) Stepas Butautas (1947–1956)
- (Lithuania) Justinas Lagunavičius (1945–1954)
- (Lithuania) Vincas Sercevičius (1944–1945, 1946–1951)
- (Lithuania) Kazys Petkevičius (1947–1954, 1958–1963)
- (Lithuania) Stanislovas Stonkus (1950–1958)
- (Lithuania) Arūnas Lauritėnas (1952–1962)
- (Lithuania) Henrikas Giedraitis (1957–1972)
- (Lithuania) Romualdas Venzbergas (1962–1975)
- (Lithuania) Modestas Paulauskas (1962–1976)
- (Lithuania) Algirdas Linkevičius (1968–1982)
- (Lithuania) Sergejus Jovaiša (1972–1989)
- (Lithuania) Raimundas Čivilis (1977–1988)
- (Lithuania) Valdemaras Chomičius (1978–1989)
- (Lithuania) Gintaras Krapikas (1981–1990)
- (Lithuania) Arvydas Sabonis (1981–1989, 2001–2002, 2003–2005)
- (Lithuania) Rimas Kurtinaitis (1983–1989, 1992, 1995–1996)
- (Lithuania) Arūnas Visockas (1985–1990, 1992–1996)
- (Lithuania) Gvidonas Markevičius (1986–1990)
- (Lithuania) Romanas Brazdauskis (1987–1990, 1993–1994)
- (Lithuania) Gintaras Einikis (1987–1995, 2002–2003)
- (Lithuania) Darius Lukminas (1989–1996)
- (Lithuania) Darius Dimavičius (1989–1991)
- (Lithuania) Saulius Štombergas (1991–1993, 1997–1999, 2002–2003)
- (Lithuania) Darius Maskoliūnas (1992–1999)
- (Lithuania) Kęstutis Šeštokas (1993–2000)
- (Lithuania) Tomas Masiulis (1995–2002, 2008)
- (Lithuania) Darius Sirtautas (1995–1998)
- (Lithuania) Dainius Adomaitis (1996–1999)
- (Lithuania) Eurelijus Žukauskas (1997–2000, 2007–2009)
- (Lithuania) Virginijus Praškevičius (1997–1998)
- (Lithuania) Mindaugas Žukauskas (1997–2000)
- (Lithuania) Giedrius Gustas (1998–1999, 2000–2004)
- (Lithuania) Donatas Slanina (1999–2002)
- (Lithuania) Andrius Jurkūnas (2000–2001)
- (Lithuania) Mindaugas Timinskas (1999–2000, 2002–2005)
- (Lithuania) Dainius Šalenga (2000–2005, 2007–2012)
- (Lithuania) Tadas Klimavičius (2002–2003, 2008–2014)
- (Lithuania) Darjuš Lavrinovič (2003–2006, 2012–2013)
- (Lithuania) Paulius Jankūnas (2003–2009, 2010–2022)
- (Lithuania) Martynas Andriuškevičius (2004–2005)
- (Lithuania) Jonas Mačiulis (2005–2009)
- (Lithuania) Mantas Kalnietis (2006–2012, 2015–2016, 2021–2022)
- (Lithuania) Artūras Milaknis (2007–2008, 2008–2011, 2013–2015, 2016–2022)
- (Lithuania) Donatas Motiejūnas (2007–2008)
- (Lithuania) Tomas Dimša (2009–2015, 2020–2025)
- (Lithuania) Marius Grigonis (2009–2013, 2018–2021, 2026–present)
- (Lithuania) Adas Juškevičius (2009–2010, 2012–2013)
- (Lithuania) Martynas Pocius (2009–2011, 2013–2014, 2015–2016)
- (Lithuania) Mindaugas Kuzminskas (2010–2013)
- (Lithuania) Tomas Delininkaitis (2010–2012)
- (Lithuania) Robertas Javtokas (2011–2017)
- (Lithuania) Kšyštof Lavrinovič (2012–2014)
- (Lithuania) Rimantas Kaukėnas (2012–2013)
- (Lithuania) Artūras Gudaitis (2013–2015)
- (Lithuania) Šarūnas Jasikevičius (2013–2014)
- (Lithuania) Darius Songaila (2014–2015)
- (Lithuania) Edgaras Ulanovas (2014–2020, 2021–present)
- (Lithuania) Laurynas Birutis (2014–2020, 2022–2026)
- (Lithuania) Gytis Masiulis (2014–2020)
- (Lithuania) Lukas Lekavičius (2014–2017, 2019–2025)
- (Lithuania) Renaldas Seibutis (2015–2017)
- (Lithuania) Rokas Jokubaitis (2017–2021)
- (Lithuania) Arnas Butkevičius (2022–2026)
- (Lithuania) (Canada) Ignas Brazdeikis (2022–2023, 2024–2026)
- (Lithuania) Dovydas Giedraitis (2022–present)
- (Lithuania) Deividas Sirvydis (2024–present)
- (Lithuania) Ąžuolas Tubelis (2025–present)
- (Estonia) Gert Kullamäe (1993–1994)
- (Norway) Torgeir Bryn (1995–1996)
- (Croatia) Franjo Arapović (1996–1998)
- (Croatia) Veljko Mršić (1996–1997)
- (United States) Ennis Whatley (1997–1998)
- (United States) Anthony Bowie (1998–1999)
- (United States) Tyus Edney (1998–1999)
- (Czech Republic) George Zidek (1998–2000)
- (Ukraine) Grigorij Khizhnyak (2000–2002)
- (United States) Steve Woodberry (2000–2002)
- (Canada) Sherman Hamilton (2001–2002)
- (United States) Ed Cota (2002–2004, 2005–2006)
- (Hungary) Kornél Dávid (2002–2003)
- (Latvia) Ainārs Bagatskis (2003–2005)
- (United States) Tanoka Beard (2003–2008)
- (Serbia) Miroslav Berić (2003–2004)
- (United States) Robert Pack (2004–2005)
- (United States) Kenny Anderson (2005–2006)
- (Puerto Rico) Larry Ayuso (2005–2006)
- (United States) Reggie Freeman (2005–2006)
- (United States) DeJuan Collins (2006–2008; 2010–2012)
- (Brazil) Marcelo Machado (2006–2007)
- (Finland) Hanno Möttölä (2006–2007)
- (New Zealand) Kirk Penney (2006–2007)
- (Croatia) Marko Popović (2006–2008, 2011–2013)
- (United States) Marcus Brown (2007–2008, 2009–2011)
- (Slovenia) Goran Jurak (2007–2008)
- (Croatia) Damir Markota (2007–2008)
- (Senegal) Mamadou N'Diaye (2007–2008)
- (United States) Loren Woods (2007, 2008–2009)
- (Estonia) Siim-Sander Vene (2009, 2013–2016)
- (Slovenia) Mirza Begić (2009–2010)
- (United States) Travis Watson (2009–2011)
- (United States) Ty Lawson (2011)
- (Serbia) Boban Marjanović (2011)
- (Serbia) Milovan Raković (2011–2012)
- (United States) Sonny Weems (2011–2012)
- (United States) Tremmell Darden (2012–2013)
- (United States) Oliver Lafayette (2012–2013)
- (United States) Justin Dentmon (2013–2014)
- (United States) James Anderson (2014–2015)
- (Australia) Brock Motum (2015–2017)
- (Greece) Ian Vougioukas (2015–2016)
- (Germany) Isaiah Hartenstein(2016–2017)
- (Brazil) Augusto Lima (2016–2017)
- (United States) (Ukraine) Jerome Randle (2016)
- (France) Léo Westermann (2016–2017, 2018–2019)
- (Canada) (Slovenia) Kevin Pangos (2016–2018)
- (United States) Brandon Davies (2017–2019)
- (United States) Aaron White (2017–2019)
- (Serbia) Vasilije Micić (2017–2018)
- (Slovenia) Beno Udrih (2018)
- (Australia) Jock Landale (2019–2020)
- (United States) Zach Leday (2019–2020)
- (Greece) (United States) Thomas Walkup (2019–2021)
- (France) Joffrey Lauvergne (2020–2022)
- (France) Augustine Rubit (2020–2021)
- (Democratic Republic of the Congo) Emmanuel Mudiay (2021)
- (United States) Niels Giffey (2021–2022)
- (United States) Josh Nebo (2021–2022)
- (New Zealand) Tai Webster (2021–2022)
- (Latvia) Jānis Strēlnieks (2021–2022)
- (United States) Keenan Evans (2022–2024)
- (United States) Kevarrius Hayes (2022–2024)
- (United States) Isaiah Taylor (2022–2023)
- (Latvia) Rolands Šmits (2022–2024)
- (United States) Brady Manek (2023–2025)
- (United States) Edmond Sumner (2023–2024)
- (France) Sylvain Francisco (2024–2026)
- (Serbia) Alen Smailagić (2024–2025)
- (Armenia) (United States) Bryant Dunston (2024–2025)
- (United States) Lonnie Walker IV (2024–2025)
- (United States) Moses Wright (2025–2026)

=== Players with NBA experience ===
Many players who spent time with Žalgiris also played in the NBA. The most notable example is Arvydas Sabonis, who spent seven seasons with the NBA's Portland Trail Blazers including a Western Conference Finals run in 2000. Other notable crossovers include 1994 NBA All-Star Kenny Anderson, two-time NBA champion Beno Udrih, Ty Lawson, Robert Pack, and current NBA players Boban Marjanovic, Isaiah Hartenstein, Jock Landale, and Vasilije Micić.

Nationality	Player	Seasons in Žalgiris	Seasons in the NBA
(United States)	Kenny Anderson	1	14
(United States)	Robert Pack	1	13
(Slovenia)	Beno Udrih	1	13
(United States)	Ennis Whatley	1	10
(Serbia)	Boban Marjanović	1	9
(United States)	Ty Lawson	1	8
(United States)	Mitchell Butler	1	8
(United States)	Anthony Bowie	1	8
(Lithuania)	Darius Songaila	1	8
(United States)	Lonnie Walker IV	1	7
(Lithuania)	Arvydas Sabonis	10	7
(Lithuania)	Donatas Motiejūnas	1	6
(United States)	Loren Woods	2	6
(United States) (Democratic Republic of the Congo)	Emmanuel Mudiay	1	6
(United States) (Germany)	Isaiah Hartenstein	1	6
(United States)	Edmond Sumner	1	5
(United States)	James Anderson	1	5
(United States)	Michael Bradley	1	5
(Senegal)	Mamadou N'Diaye	1	5
(United States)	Sonny Weems	1	4
(United States)	Tyus Edney	1	4
(France)	Joffrey Lauvergne	2	4
(United States)	Corey Beck	1	3
(United States)	Nate Wolters	1	3
(Czech Republic)	Jiri Zidek	2	3
(Hungary)	Kornel David	1	3
(France)	Axel Toupane	1	3
(United States)	Derrick Walton Jr.	1	3
(Lithuania) (Canada)	Ignas Brazdeikis	1	3
(Australia)	Jock Landale	1	3
(Canada) (Trinidad and Tobago) (Greece)	Naz Mitrou-Long	1	3
(Lithuania)	Šarūnas Jasikevičius	1	2
(Lithuania)	Mindaugas Kuzminskas	3	2
(United States)	Tyler Cavanaugh	2	2
(United States) (Uganda)	Brandon Davies	2	2
(United States)	Justin Dentmon	1	2
(United States)	Marcus Brown	3	2
(United States)	Isaiah Taylor	1	2
(Serbia)	Miloš Babic	1	2
(Finland)	Hanno Mottola	1	2
(New Zealand)	Kirk Penney	1	2
(Lithuania)	Martynas Andriuškevičius	3	1
(United States)	Nigel Hayes	2	1
(United States)	Will Chery	1	1
(United States)	Jeff Foote	1	1
(United States) (Croatia)	Oliver Lafayette	1	1
(Croatia) (Sweden)	Damir Markota	1	1
(Serbia) (Bosnia and Herzegovina)	Ratko Varda	1	1
(Argentina)	Patricio Garino	1	1
(Norway)	Torgeir Bryn	1	1
(Canada) (Slovenia)	Kevin Pangos	2	1
(Slovenia)	Zoran Dragić	1	1
(Serbia)	Vasilije Micić	1	2

== Head coaches ==
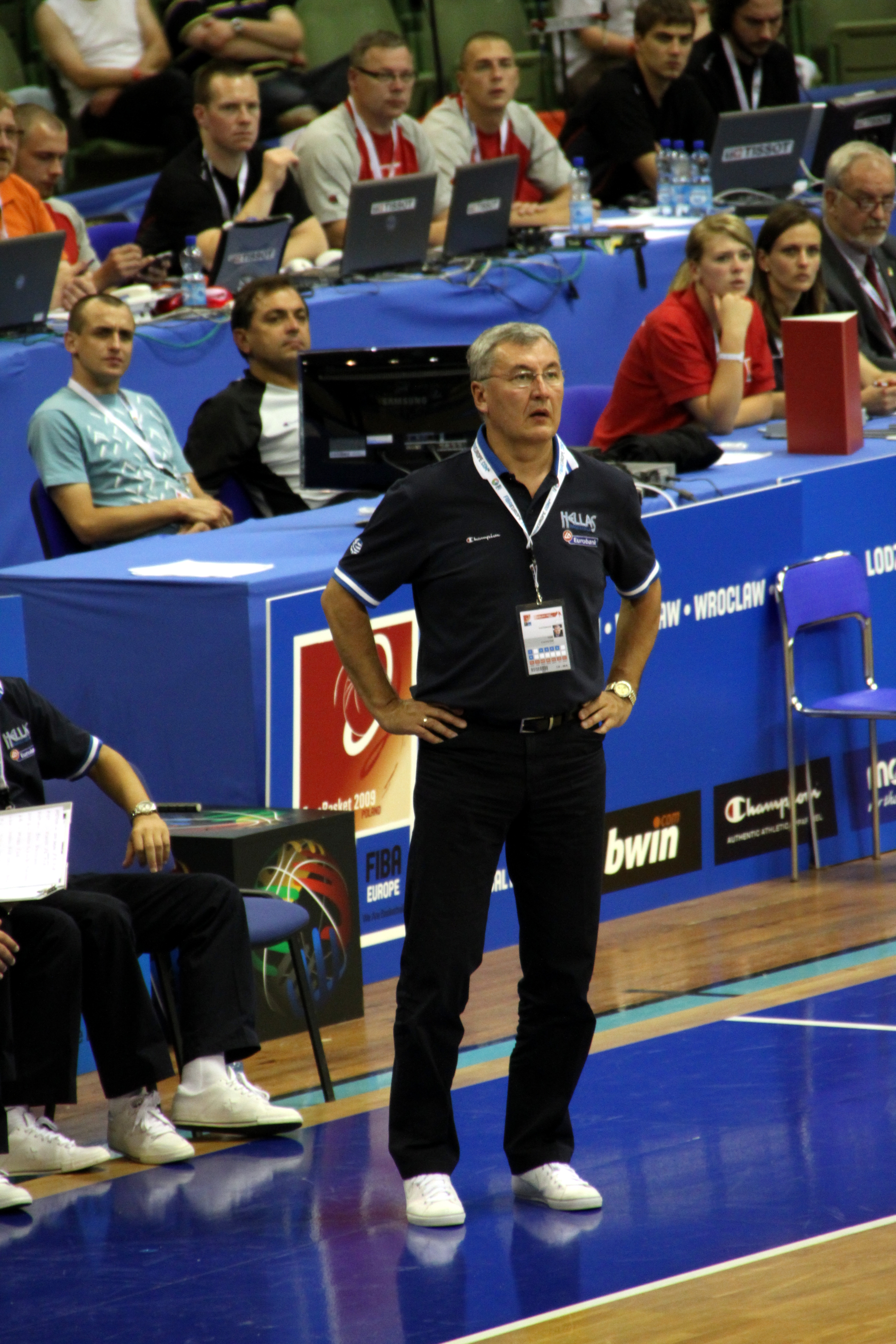
Jonas Kazlauskas was the head coach of Žalgiris during the 1998–99 season. Žalgiris won the EuroLeague that season.

- (Lithuania) Mykolas Ziminskas: 1944–1946
- (Lithuania) Vytautas Kulakauskas: 1946
- (Lithuania) Mykolas Ziminskas: 1947–1948
- (Lithuania) Janis Grinbergas: 1949
- (Lithuania) Valerijus Griešnovas: 1950
- (Lithuania) Vincas Sercevičius: 1952
- (Lithuania) Vytautas Kulakauskas: 1952
- (Lithuania) Vincas Sercevičius: 1953–1956
- (Lithuania) Valerijus Griešnovas: 1957–1958
- (Lithuania) Kazimieras Petkevičius: 1959–1962
- (Lithuania) Vytautas Bimba: 1962–1975
- (Lithuania) Stepas Butautas: 1975–1978, 1979
- (Lithuania) Algimantas Rakauskas: 1978–1979
- (Lithuania) Vladas Garastas: 1979–1989
- (Lithuania) Henrikas Giedraitis: 1989–1990
- (Lithuania) Raimundas Sargūnas: 1990–1991
- (Lithuania) Modestas Paulauskas: 1991–1992
- (Lithuania) Henrikas Giedraitis: 1992–1993
- (Estonia) Jaak Salumets: 1993–1994
- (Lithuania) Jonas Kazlauskas: 1994–2000
- (Lithuania) Algirdas Brazys: 2000–2002
- (Lithuania) Antanas Sireika: 2002–2006
- (Latvia) Ainars Bagatskis: 2006
- (Lithuania) Rimantas Grigas: 2006–2008, 2010–2011
- (Lithuania) Gintaras Krapikas: 2008–2009, 2014–2016
- (Lithuania) Ramūnas Butautas: 2009–2010
- (Lithuania) Darius Maskoliūnas: 2010
- (United States) Marcus Brown: 2010
- (Serbia) Aleksandar Petrović: 2010
- (Greece) Ilias Zouros: 2011, 2013
- (Lithuania) Vitoldas Masalskis: 2011
- (Serbia) Aleksandar Trifunović: 2011–2012
- (Spain) Joan Plaza: 2012–2013
- (Greece) Ilias Zouros: 2013
- (Lithuania) Saulius Štombergas: 2013–2014
- (Lithuania) Šarūnas Jasikevičius: 2016–2020
- (Austria) Martin Schiller: 2020–2021
- (Slovenia) Jure Zdovc: 2021–2022
- (Lithuania) Kazys Maksvytis: 2022–2023
- (Italy) Andrea Trinchieri: 2023–2025
- (Lithuania) Tomas Masiulis: 2025–present

== Attendance ==
Žalgiris EuroLeague attendance year by year in Žalgiris Arena.

Season	Total	High	Low	Average	Pos.*
2011–12	105,307	15,000	9,150	13,163	1
2012–13	161,103	15,420	10,190	13,475	1
2013–14	118,433	12,000	8,150	9,869	7
2014–15	117,040	14,382	8,670	10,640	6
2015–16	131,998	14,790	8,702	11,000	2
2016–17	171,266	15,231	8,621	11,418	2
2017–18	230,518	15,525	10,195	13,560	1
2018–19	251,742	15,517	13,569	14,808	1
2019–20	199,088	15,342	9,405	14,221	1
2020–21	10,381	5,131	239	3,460	1
2021–22	106,830	12,686	4,863	7,630	4
2022–23	267,041	15,293	11,024	14,836	2

*Position by average attendance among Euroleague teams

1.Only top 16 matches were played
2.Only three games played with spectators due to COVID-19 pandemic

== Team records ==
LKL records

- Most points scored in a single game – 146 (vs LSU-Atletas, 24 January 2004)
- Highest two-pointers made percentage of all time – 57.08%
- Most offensive rebounds of all time – 25,330
- Most three pointers made in a single game – 23 (vs LSU-Atletas, 24 January 2004)
- Most points scored in a single half of a game – 87 (vs LSU-Atletas, 24 January 2004)
- Most points scored in a single quarter of a game – 46 (vs LSU-Atletas, 24 January 2004)
- Biggest win in a home game – by 82 points (vs LSU-Atletas, 24 January 2004)
- Most consecutive wins of all time – 38 (4 May 1998 – 8 November 1999)
- Most consecutive home wins of all time – 39 (18 January 2003 – 15 October 2004)
- Most consecutive away wins of all time – 23 (31 January 1998 – 8 November 1999)
- Best winning percentage of all time – 64%
- Largest single game attendance of all time – 15,266 (vs Lietuvos Rytas, in the last game of the finals)

VTB United League records

- Fewest combined points in an overtime period – 8 (Žalgiris – 6 points, Triumph – 2; 14 October 2012)
- Fewest fouls in a single game – 7 (vs Lokomotiv Kuban, 25 May 2013)
- Largest attendance at a game – 15,812 (vs CSKA, 28 October 2012)

EuroLeague records

- Most combined points in regulation – 224 (Skipper Bologna – 117 points, Žalgiris – 107; 22 January 2004)
- Fewest points in a quarter – 2 (vs Anadolu Efes, 4 December 2014)
- Most blocks in a single game – 12 (vs Adecco Estudiantes, 14 December 2000; vs Asseco Prokom, 18 December 2008)
- Most blocks per game in a season – 5.58 (2000–01 Euroleague season)

BBL records

- Most points scored in a single game – 125 (vs Barons/LU, 8 January 2005)
- Most free throws made in a single game – 37 (vs Valmieras Piens, 15 February 2005)
- Most free throws made of all time – 1,468
- Most blocks of all time – 303
- Highest points per game of all time – 92.14
- Highest efficiency per game of all time – 108.95
- Highest three point percentage of all time – 40.22
- Most blocks per game of all time – 3.94

== Previous kits ==
The uniform colors of Žalgiris are green and white. The home games are played in green uniforms and the away games are played in white. Since 2012, Adidas was the manufacturer of the club uniforms. In 2018, Žalgiris started manufacturing their own uniforms, in attempt to spread the brand image of the team while also making them more affordable to fans.

2013–2015	2015–2016	2016–2018	2013–2015	2015–2016	2016–2018

== Individual awards ==
=== Domestic ===
LKL Most Valuable Player

- Gintaras Einikis – 1994, 1995
- Tanoka Beard – 2004, 2005, 2007
- Darjuš Lavrinovič – 2006

LKL Finals MVP

- Gintaras Einikis – 1994, 1995
- Eurelijus Žukauskas – 2000
- Tanoka Beard – 2004, 2007
- Mindaugas Timinskas – 2005
- Marcus Brown – 2008
- Paulius Jankūnas – 2011, 2014
- Tomas Delininkaitis – 2012
- Mindaugas Kuzminskas – 2013
- Artūras Milaknis – 2015
- Jerome Randle – 2016
- Edgaras Ulanovas – 2017, 2019
- Brandon Davies – 2018
- Thomas Walkup – 2021
- Isaiah Taylor – 2023
- Sylvain Francisco – 2025
- Ąžuolas Tubelis – 2026

King Mindaugas Cup Finals MVP

- Edgaras Ulanovas – 2017, 2018, 2020, 2023
- Joffrey Lauvergne – 2021, 2022
- Laurynas Birutis – 2024
- Ignas Brazdeikis – 2025
- Moses Wright – 2026

LKL Rising Star

- Rokas Jokubaitis – 2021
- Lukas Lekavičius – 2015

LKL Defensive Player of the Year

- Thomas Walkup – 2019, 2020, 2021
- Robertas Javtokas – 2015

LKL Most Improved Player

- Edgaras Ulanovas – 2016

LKL Coach of the Year

- Šarūnas Jasikevičius – 2017, 2018, 2019, 2020
- Tomas Masiulis – 2026

All-LKL Team

- James Anderson – 2015
- Paulius Jankūnas – 2015, 2016, 2017
- Edgaras Ulanovas – 2016, 2019
- Lukas Lekavičius – 2017, 2022
- Brandon Davies – 2018, 2019
- Kevin Pangos – 2018
- Marius Grigonis – 2019
- Thomas Walkup – 2020
- Zach LeDay – 2020
- Joffrey Lauvergne – 2021

LKL All-Star Game MVP

- Rimas Kurtinaitis – 1996
- Mindaugas Timinskas – 2000
- Grigorij Khizhnyak – 2001
- Tanoka Beard – 2004, 2005
- Jonas Mačiulis – 2007
- Kšyštof Lavrinovič – 2013
- Darjuš Lavrinovič – 2013
- Justin Dentmon – 2014

LKL Best Legionnaire

- Kevin Pangos – 2018

LKL moment of the season

- Marek Blaževič – 2021

=== International ===
EuroLeague MVP

- Arvydas Sabonis – 2004

EuroLeague Final Four MVP

- Tyus Edney – 1999

EuroLeague Finals Top Scorer

- Arvydas Sabonis – 1986

All-EuroLeague First Team

- Arvydas Sabonis – 2004
- Brandon Davies – 2019
- Sylvain Francisco - 2026

All-EuroLeague Second Team

- Tanoka Beard – 2005
- Darjuš Lavrinovič – 2006
- Kevin Pangos – 2018
- Paulius Jankūnas – 2018

== Rivalries ==
During the Soviet era, Žalgiris had an intense rivalry with CSKA Moscow, the multiple-time champion and symbol of the Red Army. Their matchups would draw huge crowds in the 1950s, 1960s, and 1970s. The rivalry peaked during the 1980s, with the teams meeting in the USSR championship finals six times, which Žalgiris won in 1985, 1986, and 1987. It is considered to be the top rivalry in USSR basketball, as CSKA remains one of the most-hated teams in Kaunas to this day. During the 2000s and 2010s, the teams met many times in the EuroLeague, with CSKA winning most of the matches. In 2018, during the EuroLeague third place match, Žalgiris narrowly defeated CSKA, 79–77. Over the years, the two teams also met in the NEBL, as well as the VTB United League, with the matches drawing huge crowds. In 2012, one such VTB match drew a record attendance of 15,812, a record for the competition and for the Žalgiris Arena.

After the Act of the Re-Establishment of the State of Lithuania and the Independence of Lithuania in 1990, and the establishment of the Lithuanian Basketball League in 1993, Žalgiris had a rivalry with BC Atletas, coached by former-Žalgiris head coach Vladas Garastas, with both teams fighting for the LKL championship. The teams met in the LKL finals four times, with Žalgiris winning each time. Starting in 1998, Žalgiris's main rival has been BC Lietuvos Rytas, also known as BC Rytas, from Vilnius. The matches draw the biggest interest in all of LKL, with the teams having met in the finals 17 times, with Žalgiris winning 12 times and Rytas 5. The teams constantly fight for first place in the LKL standings. In the LKF Cup, King Mindaugas Cup, Baltic Basketball League, and the NEBL, Žalgiris wins most of their matchups. During the 2010s, Žalgiris has largely dominated the rivalry, with sweeps in the finals in 2012, 2013, 2015, and 2019, and in the regular season in 2017. In the 2018–19 season, Žalgiris swept Rytas in both the regular season and the final series.

== Matches against NBA teams ==
15 October 2007

Boxscore

Golden State Warriors (United States)	107–88	(Lithuania) BC Žalgiris

Oracle Arena, Oakland, California

17 October 2007

Boxscore

Toronto Raptors (Canada)	105–99	(Lithuania) BC Žalgiris

Air Canada Centre, Toronto, OT

19 October 2007

Boxscore

Washington Wizards (United States)	115–96	(Lithuania) BC Žalgiris

Verizon Center, Washington, D.C.

== Video games ==
Žalgiris basketball club was featured in the video game NBA 2K14, along with thirteen other top EuroLeague teams. The club was also featured in NBA 2K15, NBA 2K16 and NBA 2K17.
