= 2026 LKL Playoffs =

Basketball playoffs in Lithuania

2026 LKL playoffs
Tournament details
- Country: Lithuania
- Dates: 20–23 May 2026 (Quarterfinals); 26 May – 3 June 2026 (Semifinals); 6–13 June 2026 (Third place); 7–12 June 2026 (Finals)
- Season: 2025–26
- Teams: 8
- Defending champions: Žalgiris

Final positions
- Champions: Žalgiris (26th title)
- Runners-up: Juventus
- Third place: Neptūnas
- Fourth place: Lietkabelis

The 2026 LKL Playoffs known as the 2026 Betsson-LKL Playoffs for sponsorship purposes was the 31st edition of the LKL playoffs. The top eight finishers in the regular season competed for the championship. Playoffs began on 20 May 2026. Žalgiris was the defending champion and successfully defended title after winning final series 3–0 against Juventus. Žalgiris won the 26th LKL championship title.

The quarterfinals will be played in a best-of-three format with the higher seeded team playing the first and third (if necessary) game at home. Semifinals, third place game and final will be played in a best-of-five format, with the higher seed team playing games 1, 3 and 5 (if necessary) at home.

== Notable events ==
- On 12 May 2026, the first LKL playoffs pair has been set. Rytas and Juventus will face each other in the quarterfinals.
- On 13 May 2026, the second LKL playoffs pair has been set. Žalgiris will face Jonava Hipocredit in the quarterfinals stage.
- On 14 May 2026, the schedule of the 2026 Betsson–LKL quarterfinals stage has been revealed.
- On 17 May 2026, all quarterfinal matchups were revealed.
- On 22 May 2026, Žalgiris and Lietkabelis are the first semifinalists. Žalgiris defeated Jonava Hipocredit 2–0 in the best-of-three quarterfinals series, meaning Žalgiris remains the only team in the league’s history to have never missed the semifinals. Meanwhile, Lietkabelis defeated Šiauliai 2–0 in the quarterfinal series and advanced to the semifinals for the ninth consecutive time. The last time Lietkabelis failed to reach the LKL top four was in the 2015–16 LKL season.
- On 23 May 2026, Juventus and Neptūnas are the last 2026 LKL playoffs semifinalists. Juventus sensationally defeated Rytas 2–0 in the quarterfinals, meaning that Rytas will miss the LKL semifinals and medals for the first time since 1997. It is also the first time in league history that the seventh-seeded team has defeated the second-seeded team in the quarterfinals. Juventus had not reached the LKL semifinals since the 2020–21 LKL season, when they finished in fourth place. Meanwhile, Neptūnas defeated Gargždai 2–0 in the quarterfinals and are returning to the LKL semifinals after a lengthy absence. Neptūnas last reached the semifinals in the 2018–19 LKL season, when they won the bronze medals.
- On 31 May 2026, Žalgiris became the first finalist. In the semifinal series, Žalgiris defeated Lietkabelis 3–0. This will be 32nd finals appearance for Žalgiris from 33 possible. Lietkabelis will compete for third place and will try to win its fourth consecutive bronze medal.
- On 3 June 2026, Juventus defeated Neptūnas 3–1 in the semifinal series to reach the LKL finals for the first time in club history, where they will face Žalgiris. Meanwhile, Neptūnas will take on Lietkabelis in the third-place series. The series for third place will begin on 6 June 2026, while the finals series is set to start on 7 June 2026.
- On 12 June 2026, Žalgiris defeated Juventus 3–0 in the finals series to claim its 26th LKL championship title. Žalgiris finished the season with only one loss, something it had last achieved in the 2011–12 LKL season.
- On 13 June 2026, Neptūnas defeated Lietkabelis 3–1 to claim the bronze medals for the first time since the 2018–19 LKL season.

== Qualified teams ==
Pos	Team	Pld	W	L	PF	PA	PD	Qualification
1	Žalgiris	32	31	1	2920	2457	+463	Higher seed in playoffs
2	Rytas	32	20	12	2970	2730	+240	Higher seed in playoffs
3	Neptūnas	32	17	15	2969	2889	+80	Higher seed in playoffs
4	Šiauliai	32	17	15	2729	2802	−73	Higher seed in playoffs
5	Lietkabelis	32	15	17	2668	2586	+82	Lower seed in playoffs
6	Gargždai	32	15	17	2680	2797	−117	Lower seed in playoffs
7	Juventus	32	12	20	2797	2896	−99	Lower seed in playoffs
8	Jonava Hipocredit	32	9	23	2730	2999	−269	Lower seed in playoffs

Source: LKL.lt

== Playoffs schedule ==
Schedule for 2026 LKL playoffs
Phase	Dates	Other dates
Quarterfinals	20–23 May 2026	20–25 May 2026 (Note: In case a third match is needed in the quarterfinals stage.)
Semifinals	26 May – 1 June 2026	26 May – 5 June 2026 (Note: In case a fifth match is needed in the semifinals stage.)
Third place	6–11 June 2026	6–15 June 2026 (Note: In case a fifth match is needed in the third place series.)
Finals	7–12 June 2026	7–16 June 2026 (Note: In case a fifth match is needed in the finals stage.)

== Bracket ==
Quarterfinals
1	Žalgiris	2
8	Jonava Hipocredit	0
4	Šiauliai	0
5	Lietkabelis	2
2	Rytas	0
7	Juventus	2
3	Neptūnas	2
6	Gargždai	0

Semifinals
1	Žalgiris	3
5	Lietkabelis	0
7	Juventus	3
3	Neptūnas	1

Finals
1	Žalgiris	3
7	Juventus	0
Third place
5	Lietkabelis	1
3	Neptūnas	3

== Quarterfinals ==
Team 1	Series	Team 2	Game 1	Game 2	Game 3
Žalgiris	2–0	Jonava Hipocredit	102–82	90–75	–
Šiauliai	0–2	Lietkabelis	84–85	77–93	–
Rytas	0–2	Juventus	84–92	95–101	–
Neptūnas	2–0	Gargždai	100–73	84–74	–

=== Žalgiris vs. Jonava Hipocredit ===
20 May 2026 Game 1	Žalgiris	102–82 (Series: 1–0)	Jonava Hipocredit	Kaunas
18:50 (EEST)	Scoring by quarter: 22–17, 31–18, 24–17, 25–30
	Pts: Wright 18; Rebs: Sirvydis 7 Asts: Williams-Goss 8 PIR: Wright 25	Boxscore	Pts: Carter III 15; Rebs: Rutherford 10; Asts: Ashton-Langford 7 PIR: Rutherford 17	Arena: Žalgiris Arena; Attendance: 2,111; Referees: Gvidas Gedvilas, Gabrielius Simonavičius, Ignas Jablonskas

22 May 2026 Game 2	Jonava Hipocredit	75–90 (Series: 0–2)	Žalgiris	Jonava
18:30 (EEST)	Scoring by quarter: 14–32, 18–25, 26–15, 17–18
	Pts: Ashton-Langford 28; Rebs: Rutherford 10; Asts: Ashton-Langford 9 PIR: Ashton-Langford 32	Boxscore	Pts: Sirvydis 16; Rebs: Butkevičius 8 Asts: Butkevičius 5 PIR: Sirvydis 19	Arena: Jonava Arena; Attendance: 1,466; Referees: Juozas Barkauskas, Aurimas Borusas, Darius Šomka

=== Šiauliai vs. Lietkabelis ===
20 May 2026 Game 1	Šiauliai	84–85 (Series: 0–1)	Lietkabelis	Šiauliai
18:30 (EEST)	Scoring by quarter: 20–22, 23–23, 19–26, 22–14
	Pts: Henderson Jr. 19; Rebs: Pleikys 7 Asts: Kariniauskas 4 PIR: Henderson Jr. 20	Boxscore	Pts: Morris 24; Rebs: Maldūnas 7 Asts: Kullamäe 3 PIR: Morris 21	Arena: Šiauliai Arena; Attendance: 2,594; Referees: Artūras Šukys, Saulius Račys, Andžej Urbanovič

22 May 2026 Game 2	Lietkabelis	93–77 (Series: 2–0)	Šiauliai	Panevėžys
18:15 (EEST)	Scoring by quarter: 23–21, 20–22, 28–15, 22–19
	Pts: Radičević 22; Rebs: Washington 8 Asts: Radičević 4 PIR: Radičević 26	Boxscore	Pts: Henderson Jr. 16; Rebs: Simanić 9 Asts: Kariniauskas 4 PIR: Simanić 18	Arena: Kalnapilio Arena; Attendance: 2,148; Referees: Gytis Vilius, Jurgis Laurinavičius, Vidmantas Rušinas

=== Rytas vs. Juventus ===
21 May 2026 Game 1	Juventus	92–84 (Series: 1–0)	Rytas	Utena (Note: Initially first quarterfinals game between Rytas and Juventus should be played in Vilnius. However, due to the occupancy of the Utena Arena, the first game of the series will be played in Utena on 21 May. The second and third games (if necessary) will be played in Vilnius.)
18:30 (EEST)	Scoring by quarter: 29–27, 26–22, 16–16, 21–19
	Pts: Lewis; Rebs: Lewis, Uleckas 8 Asts: Valinskas 5 PIR: Lewis 25	Boxscore	Pts: Gudaitis 16; Rebs: Gudaitis 8 Asts: Marčiulionis 5 PIR: Masiulis 22	Arena: Utena Arena; Attendance: 1,693; Referees: Gytis Vilius, Gintaras Mačiulis, Vidmantas Rušinas

23 May 2026 Game 2	Rytas	95–101 (Series: 0–2)	Juventus	Vilnius
16:30 (EEST)	Scoring by quarter: 32–30, 24–20, 27–30, 12–21
	Pts: Smith 20; Rebs: Gudaitis 9 Asts: Sargiūnas, Marčiulionis 5 PIR: Smith 18	Boxscore	Pts: Diarra 30; Rebs: Šaulys, Valinskas 6 Asts: three players 4 PIR: Lewis 34	Arena: Active Vilnius Arena; Attendance: 2,058; Referees: Artūras Šukys, Gvidas Gedvilas, Andžej Urbanovič

=== Neptūnas vs. Gargždai ===
21 May 2026 Game 1	Neptūnas	100–73 (Series: 1–0)	Gargždai	Klaipėda
18:30 (EEST)	Scoring by quarter: 22–25, 32–18, 22–14, 24–16
	Pts: Lomažs, Tarolis 17; Rebs: Tarolis 7 Asts: Velička 7 PIR: Tarolis 29	Boxscore	Pts: Pipkins 20; Rebs: Chargois 6 Asts: Pipkins 5 PIR: Pipkins 27	Arena: Švyturys Arena; Attendance: 2,423; Referees: Saulius Račys, Juozas Barkauskas, Aurimas Borusas

23 May 2026 Game 2	Gargždai	74–84 (Series: 0–2)	Neptūnas	Gargždai
19:10 (EEST)	Scoring by quarter: 22−19, 18−24, 10−19, 24−22
	Pts: Pipkins 18; Rebs: Gailius, Petrilevičius 6 Asts: Gailius 5 PIR: Petrilevičius 19	Boxscore	Pts: Lomažs 22; Rebs: Mačijauskas 10; Asts: Velička 4 PIR: Lomažs 23	Arena: Gargždų Arena; Referees: Gintaras Maciulis, Juozas Barkauskas, Gabrielius Simonavičius

== Semifinals ==
Team 1	Series	Team 2	Game 1	Game 2	Game 3	Game 4	Game 5
Žalgiris	3–0	Lietkabelis	85–75	95–75	103–93	–	–
Juventus	3–1	Neptūnas	96–83	86–83	84–102	103–90	–

=== Žalgiris vs. Lietkabelis ===
26 May 2026 Game 1	Žalgiris	85–75 (Series: 1–0)	Lietkabelis	Kaunas
18:50 (EEST)	Scoring by quarter: 21–20, 21–20, 21–18, 22–17
	Pts: Francisco 20; Rebs: Tubelis 10; Asts: Francisco 6 PIR: Francisco 22	Boxscore	Pts: Morris 15; Rebs: Danusevičius 12; Asts: Five players 2 PIR: Danusevičius 24	Arena: Žalgiris Arena; Attendance: 2,984; Referees: Artūras Šukys, Gvidas Gedvilas, Gintaras Mačiulis

28 May 2026 Game 2	Lietkabelis	75–95 (Series: 0–2)	Žalgiris	Panevėžys
18:50 (EEST)	Scoring by quarter: 19−20, 17–22, 20–32, 19−21
	Pts: Morris 15; Rebs: Danusevičius 7 Asts: Radičević 3 PIR: Morris 17	Boxscore	Pts: Francisco 27; Rebs: Giedraitis 7 Asts: Lô, Williams-Goss 5 PIR: Francisco 31	Arena: Kalnapilio Arena; Attendance: 2,612; Referees: Saulius Račys, Jurgis Laurinavicius, Juozas Barkauskas

31 May 2026 Game 3	Žalgiris	103–93 (Series: 3–0)	Lietkabelis	Kaunas
16:50 (EEST)	Scoring by quarter: 29–27, 27–20, 19–21, 28–25
	Pts: Wright 25; Rebs: Tubelis 10; Asts: Francisco 6 PIR: Wright 32	Boxscore	Pts: Kullamäe 22; Rebs: Danusevičius 6 Asts: Radičević 6 PIR: Kullamäe 25	Arena: Žalgiris Arena; Attendance: 5,765; Referees: Artūras Šukys, Jurgis Laurinavičius, Andžej Urbanovič

=== Juventus vs. Neptūnas ===
27 May 2026 Game 1	Neptūnas	83–96 (Series: 0–1)	Juventus	Klaipėda
18:50 (EEST)	Scoring by quarter: 20–25, 14–26, 18–19, 31–26
	Pts: Tarolis 20; Rebs: Tarolis 9 Asts: Velička 9 PIR: Tarolis 26	Boxscore	Pts: Diarra 20; Rebs: Vraneš 9 Asts: Valinskas 6 PIR: Vraneš 21	Arena: Švyturys Arena; Attendance: 2,845; Referees: Gytis Vilius, Saulius Račys, Andžej Urbanovič

29 May 2026 Game 2	Juventus	86–83 (Series: 2–0)	Neptūnas	Utena
18:50 (EEST)	Scoring by quarter: 26–23, 14–19, 17–23, 29–18
	Pts: Valinskas 29; Rebs: Vraneš 8 Asts: Uleckas 3 PIR: Valinskas 25	Boxscore	Pts: Šiliņš 17; Rebs: Šiliņš 8 Asts: Velička 12; PIR: Šiliņš 22	Arena: Utena Arena; Attendance: 2,988; Referees: Artūras Šukys, Gvidas Gedvilas, Aurimas Borusas

1 June 2026 Game 3	Neptūnas	102–84 (Series: 1–2)	Juventus	Klaipėda
18:50 (EEST)	Scoring by quarter: 27–20, 24–22, 24–21, 27–21
	Pts: Velička 20; Rebs: Lomažs 8 Asts: Lomažs, Velička 6 PIR: Velička 19	Boxscore	Pts: Lewis 23; Rebs: Lewis 5 Asts: Lewis, Valinskas 4 PIR: Maxwell 27	Arena: Švyturys Arena; Attendance: 2,596; Referees: Gytis Vilius, Gvidas Gedvilas, Gintaras Mačiulis

3 June 2026 Game 4	Juventus	103–90 (Series: 3–1)	Neptūnas	Utena
18:50 (EEST)	Scoring by quarter: 25–23, 30–13, 23–34, 25–20
	Pts: Uleckas 21; Rebs: Vraneš 7 Asts: Valinskas 8 PIR: Uleckas 29	Boxscore	Pts: Lomažs 31; Rebs: Tarolis, Waterman 5 Asts: Velička 7 PIR: Lomažs 32	Arena: Utena Arena; Attendance: 3,004; Referees: Artūras Šukys, Saulius Račys, Juozas Barkauskas

== Third place ==
Team 1	Series	Team 2	Game 1	Game 2	Game 3	Game 4	Game 5
Lietkabelis	1–3	Neptūnas	73–86	80−68	63–66	82–91	–

6 June 2026 Game 1	Neptūnas	86–73 (Series: 1–0)	Lietkabelis	Klaipėda
16:50 (EEST)	Scoring by quarter: 31–14, 15–23, 23–25, 17–11
	Pts: Šiliņš 15; Rebs: Tarolis 7 Asts: Velička 5 PIR: Velička 25	Boxscore	Pts: Kullamäe 25; Rebs: Maldūnas 9 Asts: Radičević 6 PIR: Kullamäe 22	Arena: Švyturys Arena; Attendance: 1,447; Referees: Gytis Vilius, Jurgis Laurinavičius, Gintaras Mačiulis

8 June 2026 Game 2	Lietkabelis	80–68 (Series: 1–1)	Neptūnas	Panevėžys
18:30 (EEST)	Scoring by quarter: 18−28, 13−13, 25−13, 24–14
	Pts: Kullamäe 19; Rebs: Washington 10; Asts: Radičević 5 PIR: Kullamäe 20	Boxscore	Pts: Tarolis 16; Rebs: Tarolis 6 Asts: Velička 6 PIR: Tarolis 24	Arena: Kalnapilio Arena; Attendance: 1,952; Referees: Saulius Račys, Gvidas Gedvilas, Andžej Urbanovič

11 June 2026 Game 3	Neptūnas	66–63 (Series: 2–1)	Lietkabelis	Klaipėda
18:50 (EEST)	Scoring by quarter: 15−24, 25−13, 10−15, 16−11
	Pts: Šiliņš 14; Rebs: Tarolis 9 Asts: Velička 4 PIR: Tarolis 23	Boxscore	Pts: Danusevičius 17; Rebs: Furmanavičius 10; Asts: Bičkauskis, Kullamäe 4 PIR: Danusevičius 22	Arena: Švyturys Arena; Attendance: 2,510; Referees: Gytis Vilius, Gvidas Gedvilas, Gintaras Mačiulis

13 June 2026 Game 4	Lietkabelis	82–91 (Series: 1–3)	Neptūnas	Panevėžys
18:50 (EEST)	Scoring by quarter: 26–28, 16–22, 22–20, 18–21
		Boxscore		Arena: Kalnapilio Arena

== Finals ==
Road to the final
Žalgiris		Round	Juventus	
1st place (31–1)		Regular season	7th place (12–20)	
Opponent	Series	Playoffs	Opponent	Series
Jonava Hipocredit	2–0	Quarterfinals	Rytas	2–0
Lietkabelis	3–0	Semifinals	Neptūnas	3–1

Team 1	Series	Team 2	Game 1	Game 2	Game 3	Game 4	Game 5
Žalgiris	3–0	Juventus	107–75	100–69	95−77	–	–

7 June 2026 Game 1	Žalgiris	107–75 (Series: 1–0)	Juventus	Kaunas
16:50 (EEST)	Scoring by quarter: 27–13, 18–21, 30–26, 32–15
	Pts: Tubelis 19; Rebs: Birutis 7 Asts: Francisco 6 PIR: Tubelis, Wright 23	Boxscore	Pts: Lewis 18; Rebs: Uleckas 7 Asts: Johnson 5 PIR: Lewis 17	Arena: Žalgiris Arena; Attendance: 6,992; Referees: Artūras Šukys, Juozas Barkauskas, Aurimas Borusas

9 June 2026 Game 2	Juventus	69–100 (Series: 0–2)	Žalgiris	Utena
18:50 (EEST)	Scoring by quarter: 13–24, 17–29, 17–23, 22–24
	Pts: Valinskas 17; Rebs: Uleckas 8 Asts: Valinskas 4 PIR: Lewis 17	Boxscore	Pts: Tubelis 20; Rebs: Ulanovas 9 Asts: Williams-Goss 7 PIR: Tubelis 30	Arena: Utena Arena; Attendance: 3,124; Referees: Gytis Vilius, Saulius Račys, Gintaras Mačiulis

12 June 2026 Game 3	Žalgiris	95–77 (Series: 3–0)	Juventus	Kaunas
18:50 (EEST)	Scoring by quarter: 28−18, 22−21, 21−17, 24−21
	Pts: Sleva 19; Rebs: Butkevičius 8 Asts: Williams-Goss 10; PIR: Williams-Goss 19	Boxscore	Pts: Lewis 25; Rebs: Uleckas 9 Asts: Three players 3 PIR: Lewis 36	Arena: Žalgiris Arena; Attendance: 12,688; Referees: Artūras Šukys, Jurgis Laurinavičius, Juozas Barkauskas

2025–26 LKL champions
Žalgiris
(26th title)
