= 2025–26 King Mindaugas Cup =

2025–26 season of the Lithuanian basketball cup competition

2025–26 Karaliaus Mindaugo taurė
Tournament details
- Country: Lithuania
- City: Šiauliai
- Venue: Šiauliai Arena
- Dates: 1 October 2025 – 10 December 2025 (Group stage); 20 December 2025 – 18 January 2026 (Quarterfinals); 21–22 February 2026 (Final four)
- Teams: 9
- Defending champions: Žalgiris

Final positions
- Champions: Žalgiris (9th title)
- Runners-up: Rytas
- Third place: Lietkabelis
- Fourth place: Neptūnas

Awards
- MVP: (United States) Moses Wright

The 2025–26 King Mindaugas Cup, also known as the Citadele Karaliaus Mindaugo taurė for sponsorship purposes, was the eleventh edition of the King Mindaugas Cup. The final four was hosted by Šiauliai Arena in Šiauliai on 21–22 February 2026.

Žalgiris successfully defended the title for the 6th time in a row after defeating Rytas in the final; 101–85.

== Format ==
All 9 teams from 2025–26 LKL season will participate in this tournament. Four teams that participates in Euroleague Basketball and FIBA tournaments, have received bye's to the quarterfinals stage, while the remaining teams will participate in the round-robin stage, with the Top 4 teams advancing to the quarterfinals.

For a place in the King Mindaugas Cup final four, clubs will play two matches each. The first matches will be played at the home arena of the club that finished lower in the previous 2024–25 LKL season. Second matches will be played at home arena of the club that finished higher in the previous LKL season.

== Group stage ==
Pos	Team	Pld	W	L	PF	PA	PD	Qualification	NEV	JUV	SIA	JON	GAR
1	Nevėžis–Paskolų klubas	8	5	3	704	703	+1	Advance to Quarterfinals	—	88–84	83–78	92–74	72–94
2	Juventus	8	4	4	704	676	+28	Advance to Quarterfinals	100–102	—	96–87	97–83	90–73
3	Šiauliai	8	4	4	699	705	−6	Advance to Quarterfinals	95–92	93–85	—	86–76	89–83
4	Jonava Hipocredit	8	4	4	676	702	−26	Advance to Quarterfinals	88–101	82–80	88–80	—	97–82
5	Gargždai	8	3	5	676	673	+3		90–74	68–72	102–91	84–88	—

Source: LKL.LT
Legend: Blue = home team win; Red = away team win.

== Quarterfinals ==
Four teams Žalgiris, Rytas, Lietkabelis and Neptūnas have received byes to the Quarterfinals stage due to participating in FIBA and Euroleague Basketball competitions. Mentioned teams make up the first quarterfinals basket according to their position in 2024–25 LKL season. The second quarterfinals basket will consist of the four best teams from the group stage.

The teams in the first basket will be paired with the teams in the second basket in the following order:

- Žalgiris will play the team that finished fourth in the group stage.
- Rytas will play the team that finished third in the group stage.
- Lietkabelis will play the team that finished second in the group stage.
- Neptūnas will play the team that finished first in the group stage.

Seed 1
Team	Pos
Žalgiris	1
Rytas	2
Lietkabelis	3
Neptūnas	8

Seed 2
Team	Pos
Nevėžis–Paskolų klubas	1
Juventus	2
Šiauliai	3
Jonava Hipocredit	4

The club with better overall cumulative score after two quarterfinals matches will advance to the King Mindaugas Cup final four. On 11 December 2025, the schedule of quarterfinals has been announced.

Team 1	Agg.	Team 2	1st leg	2nd leg
Žalgiris	207–136	Jonava Hipocredit	118–73	89–63
Rytas	196–176	Šiauliai	97–82	99–94
Lietkabelis	154–144	Juventus	73–76	81–68
Neptūnas	174–143	Nevėžis–Paskolų klubas	87–76	87–67

=== Žalgiris vs. Jonava Hipocredit ===
21 December 2025 Game 1	Jonava Hipocredit	73–118	Žalgiris	Panevėžys
19:00 (EET)	Scoring by quarter: 21–33, 10–25, 19–35, 23–25
	Pts: Slavinskas, Ashton-Langford 12; Rebs: Henry 4 Asts: Ashton-Langford 6 PIR: Slavinskas 16	Boxscore	Pts: Tubelis 20; Rebs: Birutis 8 Asts: Butkevičius 6 PIR: Tubelis 25	Arena: Kalnapilio Arena; Attendance: 535; Referees: Gintaras Mačiulis, Dovydas Kairys, Ignas Kutka

17 January 2026 Game 2	Žalgiris	89–63	Jonava Hipocredit	Garliava
18:30 (EET)	Scoring by quarter: 17–16, 26–13, 26–19, 20–15
	Pts: Rubštavičius 16; Rebs: three players 7 Asts: Lô 4 PIR: Rubštavičius 18	Boxscore	Pts: Carter III 13; Rebs: Kirves 6 Asts: Ashton-Langford 5 PIR: Krikke 14	Arena: Garliava Arena; Attendance: 711; Referees: Juozas Barkauskas, Aurimas Borusas, Jonas Lazauskas

=== Rytas vs. Šiauliai ===
23 December 2025 Game 1	Šiauliai	82–97	Rytas	Šiauliai
20:00 (EET)	Scoring by quarter: 25–32, 17–27, 24–19, 16–19
	Pts: Henderson 15; Rebs: Pleikys 9 Asts: McKnight 7 PIR: Pleikys 16	Boxscore	Pts: Walker 25; Rebs: Gudaitis 10; Asts: Walker 10; PIR: Walker 31	Arena: Šiauliai Arena; Attendance: 3415; Referees: Juozas Barkauskas, Andžej Urbanovič, Jonas Lazauskas

15 January 2026 Game 2	Rytas	99–94	Šiauliai	Vilnius
18:00 (EET)	Scoring by quarter: 19–22, 33–22, 23–26, 24–24
	Pts: Sargiūnas 18; Rebs: Gudaitis 7 Asts: Smith 7 PIR: Smith 26	Boxscore	Pts: Henderson 26; Rebs: Simanić 6 Asts: McKnight 9 PIR: Fofana 26	Arena: Twinsbet Arena; Attendance: 2158; Referees: Gintaras Mačiulis, Dovydas Kairys, Tomas Stankevičius

=== Lietkabelis vs. Juventus ===
20 December 2025 Game 1	Juventus	76–73	Lietkabelis	Utena
19:30 (EET)	Scoring by quarter: 18–15, 23–15, 14–18, 21–25
	Pts: Vraneš 20; Rebs: Uleckas 6 Asts: Valinskas 4 PIR: Vraneš 24	Boxscore	Pts: Flowers 22; Rebs: Danusevičius 8 Asts: Maldūnas, Kullamäe 3 PIR: Flowers 25	Arena: Utena Arena; Attendance: 1864; Referees: Artūras Šukys, Aurimas Borusas, Darius Šomka

18 January 2026 Game 2	Lietkabelis	81–68	Juventus	Panevėžys
16:00 (EET)	Scoring by quarter: 14–9, 18–20, 22–17, 27–22
	Pts: Kullamäe 24; Rebs: Maldūnas, Aimaq 6 Asts: Kullamäe 6 PIR: Kullamäe 32	Boxscore	Pts: Diarra 15; Rebs: Uleckas 9 Asts: Diarra 5 PIR: Diarra 16	Arena: Kalnapilio Arena; Attendance: 1979; Referees: Gytis Vilius, Gvidas Gedvilas, Gabrielius Simonavičius

=== Neptūnas vs. Nevėžis–Paskolų klubas ===
23 December 2025 Game 1	Nevėžis–Paskolų klubas	76–87	Neptūnas	Kėdainiai
18:00 (EET)	Scoring by quarter: 15–26, 28–15, 13–23, 20–23
	Pts: Miguel 17; Rebs: Marcinkevičius 8 Asts: Miguel 3 PIR: Muila 17	Boxscore	Pts: Kozys, Lomažs 17; Rebs: Majauskas 8 Asts: Velička 4 PIR: Waterman 23	Arena: Kėdainiai Arena; Attendance: 918; Referees: Gytis Vilius, Gabrielius Simonavičius, Deividas Mačiulskis

17 January 2026 Game 2	Neptūnas	87–67	Nevėžis–Paskolų klubas	Klaipėda
16:00 (EET)	Scoring by quarter: 17–13, 21–24, 30–15, 19–15
	Pts: Lomažs 19; Rebs: Kozys, Waterman 7 Asts: Velička 6 PIR: Lomažs 21	Boxscore	Pts: McLaughlin 16; Rebs: Marcinkevičius 7 Asts: Vaitkus, Chargois 3 PIR: McLaughlin 13	Arena: Švyturys Arena; Attendance: 1856; Referees: Artūras Šukys, Andžej Urbanovič, Darius Šomka

== Final four ==
Semifinals; 21 February
Žalgiris	119
Neptūnas	81
Rytas	106
Lietkabelis	89

Final; 22 February
Žalgiris	101
Rytas	85
Third place 22 February
Neptūnas	73
Lietkabelis	94

=== Semifinals ===
21 February 2026	Žalgiris	119–81	Neptūnas	Šiauliai
15:15 (EET)	Scoring by quarter: 31–22, 25–22, 35–20, 28–17
	Pts: Sleva 23; Rebs: Tubelis 7 Asts: Lô 9 PIR: Tubelis 29	Boxscore	Pts: Lomažs 17; Rebs: Šiliņš 5 Asts: Velička 5 PIR: Lomažs 16	Arena: Šiauliai Arena; Attendance: 5380; Referees: Artūras Šukys, Gvidas Gedvilas, Andžej Urbanovič

Starters:			Pts	Reb	Ast
PG	1	(United States) Nigel Williams-Goss	4	0	6
SG	3	(France) Sylvain Francisco	16	1	3
SF	8	(Lithuania) Ignas Brazdeikis	6	3	1
PF	10	(Lithuania) Ąžuolas Tubelis	21	7	2
C	7	(United States) Moses Wright	9	3	5
Reserves:					
G	9	(Lithuania) Dovydas Giedraitis	8	1	3
G	12	(Germany) Maodo Lô	4	1	9
PF	14	(United States) Dustin Sleva	23	3	2
C	15	(Lithuania) Laurynas Birutis	12	2	0
SG	17	(Lithuania) Mantas Rubštavičius	0	0	3
G/F	91	(Lithuania) Deividas Sirvydis	9	2	0
F	92	(Lithuania) Edgaras Ulanovas	7	1	0
Head coach:
(Lithuanian Basketball Federation) Tomas Masiulis

Žalgiris	Neptūnas

Starters:			Pts	Reb	Ast
PG	11	(Lithuania) Arnas Velička	10	3	5
SG	6	(Latvia) Rihards Lomažs	17	1	3
SF	21	(Lithuania) Arnas Beručka	2	0	1
PF	1	(Lithuania) Donatas Tarolis	7	1	1
C	25	(Latvia) Kārlis Šiliņš	13	5	1
Reserves:					
G	8	(Lithuania) Mindaugas Girdžiūnas	13	1	3
F	10	(Lithuania) Vitalijus Kozys	0	4	0
F/C	13	(Lithuania) Aurimas Majauskas	12	2	1
C	16	(Lithuania) Matas Mačijauskas	0	2	0
F/C	24	(United States) Zane Waterman	5	3	1
G	77	(Lithuania) Kristupas Leščiauskas	2	1	0
Head coach:
(Lithuanian Basketball Federation) Gediminas Petrauskas

21 February 2026	Rytas	106–89	Lietkabelis	Šiauliai
18:45 (EET)	Scoring by quarter: 29–20, 27–17, 26–22, 24–30
	Pts: Sargiūnas 29; Rebs: Gudaitis 7 Asts: Smith 7 PIR: Sargiūnas 31	Boxscore	Pts: Morris 16; Rebs: Maldūnas 6 Asts: Radičević 8 PIR: Furmanavičius 20	Arena: Šiauliai Arena; Attendance: 3,963; Referees: Gytis Vilius, Saulius Račys, Juozas Barkauskas

Starters:			Pts	Reb	Ast
PG	44	(United States) Speedy Smith	3	2	7
SG	10	(United States) Jerrick Harding	17	3	2
SF	43	(Lithuania) Ignas Sargiūnas	29	6	0
PF	9	(Germany) Kay Bruhnke	7	6	2
C	8	(Lithuania) Artūras Gudaitis	7	7	1
Reserves:					
G	1	(United States) Jordan Walker (basketball)	22	2	3
SG	16	(Lithuania) Ignas Urbonas	5	1	0
G	19	(Lithuania) Nikas Stuknys	0	0	0
F/C	21	(Lithuania) Gytis Masiulis	13	1	1
SG	22	(Lithuania) Gantas Križanauskas	0	0	0
F	24	(United States) Jordan Caroline	3	5	5
Head coach:
(Lithuanian Basketball Federation) Giedrius Žibėnas

Rytas	Lietkabelis

Starters:			Pts	Reb	Ast
PG	2	(Lithuania) Dovis Bičkauskis	0	3	2
SG	7	(Estonia) Kristian Kullamäe	13	2	4
SF	77	(Lithuania) Paulius Danusevičius	11	4	3
PF	35	(Lithuania) Danielius Lavrinovičius	13	2	0
C	6	(Bosnia and Herzegovina) Lazar Mutic	5	0	0
Reserves:					
SG	1	(United States) Jamel Morris	16	2	2
F	4	(Lithuania) Justas Furmanavičius	13	4	3
C	12	(Lithuania) Gabrielius Maldūnas	13	6	1
G	24	(Lithuania) Nojus Kulieša	0	0	0
PG	44	(Serbia) Nikola Radičević	5	3	8
Head coach:
(Basketball Federation of Serbia) Nenad Čanak (basketball)

=== Third place game ===
22 February 2026	Neptūnas	73–94	Lietkabelis	Šiauliai
15:15 (EET)	Scoring by quarter: 24–16, 12–31, 21–24, 16–23
	Pts: Lomažs 27; Rebs: Velička 5 Asts: Velička, Lomažs 6 PIR: Lomažs 31	Boxscore	Pts: Danusevičius 23; Rebs: Maldūnas 12; Asts: Danusevičius, Kullamäe 6 PIR: Danusevičius 32	Arena: Šiauliai Arena; Attendance: 5380; Referees: Gvidas Gedvilas, Juozas Barkauskas, Gintaras Mačiulis

Starters:			Pts	Reb	Ast
PG	11	(Lithuania) Arnas Velička	3	5	6
SG	6	(Latvia) Rihards Lomažs	27	2	6
SF	21	(Lithuania) Arnas Beručka	6	1	1
PF	24	(United States) Zane Waterman	10	4	1
C	25	(Latvia) Kārlis Šiliņš	6	3	0
Reserves:					
F/C	1	(Lithuania) Donatas Tarolis	7	2	1
G	8	(Lithuania) Mindaugas Girdžiūnas	9	1	0
F	10	(Lithuania) Vitalijus Kozys	2	1	1
F/C	13	(Lithuania) Aurimas Majauskas	3	1	2
C	16	(Lithuania) Matas Mačijauskas	0	1	0
G	77	(Lithuania) Kristupas Leščiauskas	0	0	0
Head coach:
(Lithuanian Basketball Federation) Gediminas Petrauskas

Neptūnas	Lietkabelis

Starters:			Pts	Reb	Ast
PG	2	(Lithuania) Dovis Bičkauskis	0	2	1
SG	7	(Estonia) Kristian Kullamäe	16	3	6
SF	6	(Bosnia and Herzegovina) Lazar Mutic	2	3	0
PF	77	(Lithuania) Paulius Danusevičius	23	6	6
C	35	(Lithuania) Danielius Lavrinovičius	11	5	0
Reserves:					
SG	1	(United States) Jamel Morris	5	1	2
F	4	(Lithuania) Justas Furmanavičius	14	6	1
F	10	(Lithuania) Vytenis Lipkevičius	DNP		
C	12	(Lithuania) Gabrielius Maldūnas	14	12	3
G	24	(Lithuania) Nojus Kulieša	0	0	0
PG	44	(Serbia) Nikola Radičević	9	4	2
Head coach:
(Basketball Federation of Serbia) Nenad Čanak (basketball)

=== Final ===
22 February 2026	Žalgiris	101–85	Rytas	Šiauliai
18:00 (EET)	Scoring by quarter: 25–21, 37–16, 22–27, 17–21
	Pts: Wright 27; Rebs: Wright, Lô 6 Asts: Francisco 10; PIR: Francisco 33	Boxscore	Pts: Sargiūnas 16; Rebs: Gudaitis 6 Asts: Smith 6 PIR: Smith 18	Arena: Šiauliai Arena; Attendance: 5450; Referees: Gytis Vilius, Artūras Šukys, Saulius Račys

Starters:			Pts	Reb	Ast
PG	1	(United States) Nigel Williams-Goss	2	5	6
SG	3	(France) Sylvain Francisco	23	2	10
SF	10	(Lithuania) Ąžuolas Tubelis	14	4	1
PF	92	(Lithuania) Edgaras Ulanovas	4	2	2
C	7	(United States) Moses Wright	27	6	0
Reserves:					
SF	8	(Lithuania) Ignas Brazdeikis	5	3	1
G	9	(Lithuania) Dovydas Giedraitis	4	2	2
G	12	(Germany) Maodo Lô	8	6	0
PF	14	(United States) Dustin Sleva	7	4	1
C	15	(Lithuania) Laurynas Birutis	7	2	0
SG	17	(Lithuania) Mantas Rubštavičius	0	1	0
G/F	91	(Lithuania) Deividas Sirvydis	0	0	0
Head coach:
(Lithuanian Basketball Federation) Tomas Masiulis

Žalgiris	Rytas

2025–26 King Mindaugas Cup champions
Žalgiris
(9th title)

King Mindaugas Cup MVP
(United States) Moses Wright

Starters:			Pts	Reb	Ast
PG	44	(United States) Speedy Smith	15	1	6
SG	10	(United States) Jerrick Harding	11	2	1
SF	43	(Lithuania) Ignas Sargiūnas	16	4	0
PF	9	(Germany) Kay Bruhnke	10	4	1
C	8	(Lithuania) Artūras Gudaitis	4	6	1
Reserves:					
G	1	(United States) Jordan Walker (basketball)	11	0	3
SG	16	(Lithuania) Ignas Urbonas	2	2	0
G	19	(Lithuania) Nikas Stuknys	DNP		
F/C	21	(Lithuania) Gytis Masiulis	5	4	0
SG	22	(Lithuania) Gantas Križanauskas	0	0	0
F	24	(United States) Jordan Caroline	11	3	1
Head coach:
(Lithuanian Basketball Federation) Giedrius Žibėnas

== Three-Point contest ==
Contestants
Pos.	Player	Team	Height (m)	Weight (kg)	First round	Semifinal	Final
G	(United States) Olin Carter III	Jonava Hipocredit	1.90	86	18	–	–
SG	(United States) Trenton McLaughlin^{REP}	Nevėžis–Paskolų klubas	1.98	91	13	–	–
G/F	(Lithuania) Nojus Mineikis	Gargždai	2.01	90	22	22	21
SG	(Lithuania) Evaldas Šaulys	Juventus	1.91	87	12	–	–
F/C	(Lithuania) Dovydas Romančenko	Šiauliai	2.06	100	20	15	–
G	(Lithuania) Nojus Kulieša	Lietkabelis	1.93	88	9	–	–
F	(Lithuania) Vitalijus Kozys^{REP}	Neptūnas	2.01	97	19 (5) (7)^{AS}	22	16
SG	(Lithuania) Gantas Križanauskas^{REP}	Rytas	1.94	91	19 (5) (6)^{AS}	–	–
SG	(Lithuania) Mantas Rubštavičius	Žalgiris	1.98	84	18	–	–
G	(Lithuania) Zigmas Petraitis	Tornado KM	1.86	73	17	–	–
G	(United States) Jordan Walker	Rytas	1.80	77	22	16	–

^REP Trenton McLaughlin replaces Nedas Montvila due to injury. Gantas Križanauskas from Rytas replaces Simonas Lukošius and Vitalijus Kozys from Neptūnas replaces Harrison Cleary due to injuries.
^AS The numbers in parentheses indicate the additional series that was needed after the participants scored the same number of points.
