= LKL MVP of the Month =

The LKL MVP of the Month is the basketball award given to the best Lithuanian Basketball League (LKL) player for each month of the season.

== LKL Monthly MVPs ==
| Month | Player | Nationality | Team | PIR | Ref |
2014–15 season
| September | Not awarded | | | | |
| October | Gediminas Orelik | Lithuania | Lietuvos rytas | 15.1 | |
| November | Rashaun Broadus | United States | Juventus | 18.8 | |
| December | Jonathan Lee | United States | Šiauliai | 23.5 | |
| January | Alex Oriakhi | United States | Pieno žvaigždės | 18.5 | |
| February | Antanas Kavaliauskas | Lithuania | Lietuvos rytas | 23 | |
| March | Rokas Giedraitis | Lithuania | Šiauliai | 22.8 | |
| April | Gytis Sirutavičius | Lithuania | Pieno žvaigždės | 18.7 | |
2015–16 season
| September | Not awarded | | | | |
| October | Vytautas Šulskis | Lithuania | Vytautas | 18.1 | |
| November | Egidijus Dimša | Lithuania | Juventus | 24.8 | |
| December | Jerai Grant | United States | Neptūnas | 20.8 | |
| January | Spencer Butterfield | United States | Juventus | 25.6 | |
| February | Paulius Jankūnas | Lithuania | Žalgiris | 21.6 | |
| March | Spencer Butterfield | United States | Juventus | 23 | |
| April | Rokas Giedraitis | Lithuania | Šiauliai | 20 | |
2016–17 season
| September | Not awarded | | | | |
| October | Kšyštof Lavrinovič | Lithuania | Lietkabelis | 25.3 | |
| November | Vaidas Čepukaitis | Lithuania | Juventus | 23 | |
| December | Derrick Low | United States | Pieno žvaigždės | 24.5 | |
| January | Vytautas Šulskis | Lithuania | Juventus | 19.5 | |
| February | Saulius Kulvietis | Lithuania | Vytautas | 23.3 | |
| March | Vytenis Lipkevičius | Lithuania | Vytautas | 26.3 | |
| April | Artūras Gudaitis | Lithuania | Lietuvos rytas | 18.7 | |
2017–18 season
| September | Juan Palacios | Colombia | Neptūnas | 22.7 | |
| October | Arnas Butkevičius | Lithuania | Neptūnas | 25.5 | |
| November | Vyacheslav Bobrov | Ukraine | Pieno žvaigždės | 28.3 | |
| December | Edgaras Želionis | Lithuania | Neptūnas | 18.8 | |
| January | Renaldas Seibutis | Lithuania | Neptūnas | 25 | |
| February | Lorenzo Williams | United States | Lietkabelis | 28 | |
| March | Laurynas Birutis | Lithuania | Šiauliai | 26.4 | |
| April | Laurynas Birutis | Lithuania | Šiauliai | 23.4 | |
2018–19 season
| September | Ignas Vaitkus | Lithuania | Šiauliai | 24 | |
| October | Emmanuel Omogbo | Nigeria | Pieno žvaigždės | 20.6 | |
| November | Arnas Butkevičius | Lithuania | Rytas | 20.8 | |
| December | Jerai Grant | United States | Neptūnas | 24.7 | |
| January | Tomas Lekūnas | Lithuania | Pieno žvaigždės | 22.3 | |
| February | Kerem Kanter | Turkey | Dzūkija | 31 | |
| March | Martinas Geben | Lithuania | Juventus | 22.5 | |
| April | Gytis Masiulis | Lithuania | Neptūnas | 19.8 | |
2019–20 season
| September | Evaldas Kairys | Lithuania | Rytas | 20 | |
| October | Rokas Gustys | Lithuania | Šiauliai | 23 | |
| November | Martinas Geben | Lithuania | Žalgiris | 18 | |
| December | Chauncey Collins | United States | Sintek–Dzūkija | 26.5 | |
| January | Željko Šakić | Croatia | Lietkabelis | 23.4 | |
| February | Laurynas Birutis | Lithuania | CBet Prienai | 31 | |
| March | Not awarded because season was canceled due to coronavirus pandemic | | | | |
| April | Not awarded because season was canceled due to coronavirus pandemic | | | | |
2020–21 season
| September | Demetrius Jackson | United States | Rytas | 22 | |
| October | Regimantas Miniotas | Lithuania | CBet Prienai | 30.5 | |
| November | Elvar Már Friðriksson | Iceland | Šiauliai | 27 | |
| December | Edgaras Želionis | Lithuania | Pieno žvaigždės | 26 | |
| January | Žygimantas Skučas | Lithuania | Juventus | 22.7 | |
| February | Vaidas Kariniauskas | Lithuania | Juventus | 26.5 | |
| March | Tomas Lekūnas | Lithuania | Pieno žvaigždės | 23.2 | |
| April | Mindaugas Kupšas | Lithuania | Juventus | 25.6 | |
2021–22 season
| September | Jon Elmore | United States | Šiauliai–7bet | 19.7 | |
| October | Patrick Miller | United States | Uniclub Casino – Juventus | 28 | |
| November | Giedrius Staniulis | Lithuania | Šiauliai–7bet | 26 | |
| December | Đorđe Gagić | Serbia | Lietkabelis | 26.3 | |
| January | Manu Lecomte | Belgium | CBet Jonava | 28 | |
| February | Manu Lecomte | Belgium | CBet Jonava | 32.5 | |
| March | Ivan Buva | Croatia | Rytas | 21 | |
| April | Juan Palacios | Colombia | CBet Jonava | 27.6 | |
2022–23 season
| September | Not awarded | | | | |
| October | Jeff Garrett | United States | CBet Jonava | 19.8 | |
| November | Giedrius Staniulis | Lithuania | Gargždai-SC | 23.5 | |
| December | Gytis Radzevičius | Lithuania | Rytas | 25.7 | |
| January | Martynas Echodas | Lithuania | Rytas | 27 | |
| February | Deshawn Freeman | United States | Nevėžis–Optibet | 28 | |
| March | Tim Lambrecht | Belgium | Nevėžis–Optibet | 31.5 | |
| April | Tim Lambrecht | Belgium | Nevėžis–Optibet | 22.9 | |
2023–24 season
| September | Gytis Masiulis | Lithuania | Rytas | 24.5 | |
| October | Nick Ward | United States | Gargždai-SC | 27.7 | |
| November | Brandon Tabb | United States | Pieno žvaigždės | 26.7 | |
| December | Zane Waterman | United States | Nevėžis–Optibet | 24.5 | |
| January–February | Marcus Foster | United States | Rytas | 21.8 | |
| March | Zane Waterman | United States | Nevėžis–Optibet | 27.4 | |
| April | Amit Ebo | Israel | Nevėžis–Optibet | 27.3 | |
2024–25 season
| September–October | Anthony Cowan Jr. | United States | Wolves Twinsbet | 19.3 | |
| November | Kay Bruhnke | Germany | M Basket–Delamode | 24 | |
| December | Chauncey Collins | United States | M Basket–Delamode | 29 | |
| January–February | Amit Ebo | Israel | Nevėžis–Optibet | 24.8 | |
| March | Gytis Radzevičius | Lithuania | Rytas | 27.3 | |
| April | Dominic Brewton | United States | CBet Jonava | 21.6 | |
2025–26 season
| September–October | Artūras Gudaitis | Lithuania | Rytas | 22 | |
| November | Augustine Rubit | United States | Lietkabelis | 25.3 | |
| December | Arnas Velička | Lithuania | Neptūnas | 26.7 | |
| January | Jerrick Harding | United States | Rytas | 28.3 | |
| February | Cedric Henderson Jr. | United States | Šiauliai | 25 | |
| March | Ignas Sargiūnas | Lithuania | Rytas | 33 | |
| April | Arnas Velička | Lithuania | Neptūnas | 23.5 | |
| May | Gytis Masiulis | Lithuania | Rytas | 23.3 | |
2026–27 season
| September–October | Jaquan Carlos | United States | Gargždai | 26.3 | |

== Multiple winners ==
The below table lists those who have won on more than one occasion.

| * | Indicates current LKL player |

| Rank | Player | Awards |
|---|---|---|
| 1. | (Lithuania) Laurynas Birutis | 3 |
| 1. | (Lithuania) Gytis Masiulis* | 3 |
| 2. | (Lithuania) Rokas Giedraitis | 2 |
| 2. | (Lithuania) Vytautas Šulskis | 2 |
| 2. | (United States) Jerai Grant | 2 |
| 2. | (United States) Spencer Butterfield | 2 |
| 2. | (Lithuania) Artūras Gudaitis* | 2 |
| 2. | (Colombia) Juan Palacios | 2 |
| 2. | (Lithuania) Arnas Butkevičius* | 2 |
| 2. | (Lithuania) Edgaras Želionis | 2 |
| 2. | (Lithuania) Tomas Lekūnas | 2 |
| 2. | (Lithuania) Martinas Geben | 2 |
| 2. | (United States) Chauncey Collins | 2 |
| 2. | (Lithuania) Giedrius Staniulis | 2 |
| 2. | (Belgium) Manu Lecomte | 2 |
| 2. | (Lithuania) Gytis Radzevičius* | 2 |
| 2. | (Belgium) Tim Lambrecht* | 2 |
| 2. | (United States) Zane Waterman | 2 |
| 2. | (Israel) Amit Ebo | 2 |
| 2. | (Lithuania) Arnas Velička | 2 |

== Awards won by nationality ==
| Rank | Country | MVP Awards |
|---|---|---|
| 1. | Lithuania | 45 |
| 2. | United States | 27 |
| 3. | Belgium | 4 |
| 4. | Colombia | 2 |
| 4. | Croatia | 2 |
| 4. | Israel | 2 |
| 5. | Ukraine | 1 |
| 5. | Nigeria | 1 |
| 5. | Turkey | 1 |
| 5. | Iceland | 1 |
| 5. | Serbia | 1 |
| 5. | Germany | 1 |

== Awards won by club ==
- Clubs in italics no longer exist.

| Rank | Club | MVP Awards |
|---|---|---|
| 1. | Lietuvos rytas / Rytas | 16 |
| 2. | Juventus | 11 |
| 2. | Šiauliai | 11 |
| 3. | Neptūnas | 9 |
| 3. | Pieno žvaigždės | 9 |
| 4. | Nevėžis–Optibet | 7 |
| 5. | CBet Jonava | 5 |
| 5. | Vytautas / CBet Prienai | 5 |
| 5. | Lietkabelis | 5 |
| 6. | Dzūkija | 2 |
| 6. | Gargždai-SC | 2 |
| 6. | M Basket–Delamode | 2 |
| 6. | Žalgiris | 2 |
| 7. | Gargždai | 1 |
| 7. | Wolves Twinsbet | 1 |

== See also ==
- LKL Most Valuable Player Award
