= LKL Coach of the Year =

The LKL Coach of the Year is an annual award of Lithuanian Basketball League (LKL), that is given to each season's best head coach. Šarūnas Jasikevičius has won this award three times, Dainius Adomaitis and Mantas Šernius two times.

== Winners ==
Season	Head coach	Team	Ref
2014–15	(Lithuania) Dainius Adomaitis	Juventus	
2015–16	(Lithuania) Dainius Adomaitis (2×)	Neptūnas	
2016–17	(Lithuania) Šarūnas Jasikevičius	Žalgiris	
2017–18	(Lithuania) Šarūnas Jasikevičius (2×)	Žalgiris	
2018–19	(Lithuania) Šarūnas Jasikevičius (3×)	Žalgiris	
2019–20	Not awarded ^{1}		
2020–21	(Lithuania) Mantas Šernius	Cbet Prienai	
2021–22	(Lithuania) Giedrius Žibėnas	Rytas	
2022–23	(Lithuania) Virginijus Šeškus	Cbet Jonava	
2023–24	(Serbia) Oliver Kostić	Uniclub Casino – Juventus	
2024–25	(Lithuania) Mantas Šernius (2×)	Cbet Jonava	
2025–26	(Lithuania) Tomas Masiulis	Žalgiris	

Notes:

^1 The season was cancelled due to the coronavirus pandemic in Europe.

== Multiple honours ==
=== Head coaches ===
Number	Head coach
3	(Lithuania) Šarūnas Jasikevičius
2	(Lithuania) Dainius Adomaitis
2	(Lithuania) Mantas Šernius
1	(Lithuania) Giedrius Žibėnas
1	(Lithuania) Virginijus Šeškus
1	(Serbia) Oliver Kostić
1	(Lithuania) Tomas Masiulis

=== Head coach nationality ===
Number	Country
10	Lithuania
1	Serbia

=== Teams ===
Number	Team
4	Žalgiris
2	Juventus
2	Cbet Jonava
1	Cbet Prienai
1	Rytas
