= Cedric Henderson =

Cedric Henderson may refer to:

- Cedric Henderson Jr. (born 2000), American basketball player,
- Cedric Henderson (basketball, born 1975), American former basketball player, played 1997–2007
- Cedric Henderson (basketball, born 1965) (1965–2023), American basketball player, played 1985–1995
