= 2026 Italian Basketball Supercup =

2026 Frecciarossa Supercoppa
Tournament details
- Arena: Nova Arena; Tortona, Piedmont, Italy
- Dates: 19–20 September 2026

Final positions
- Champions: Olimpia Milano (7th title)
- Runners-up: Reyer Venezia

Awards and statistics
- MVP: (United States) Moses Wright

The 2026 Italian Basketball Supercup (Italian: Supercoppa di pallacanestro 2026), also known as Sisal Club Supercoppa 2026 for sponsorship reasons, was the 32nd edition of the super cup tournament, organized by the Lega Basket Serie A (LBA).

The tournament was played under a Final Four format at the Nova Arena in Tortona from 19 to 20 September 2026. Olimpia Milano won the title for the 7th time in their history after defeating Reyer Venezia 94–87 in overtime during the final. Moses Wright was named the tournament's MVP.

== Participant teams ==
The four teams that qualified for the tournament were the finalists of the previous LBA and Italian Cup competitions:

- Olimpia Milano (2025–26 LBA Champions)
- Reyer Venezia (2025–26 LBA Finalists)
- Derthona Basket (Host)
- Virtus Bologna

== Bracket ==
Semifinals (19 September)
Derthona Basket	90
Reyer Venezia	98
Olimpia Milano	80
Virtus Bologna	71

Final (20 September)
Reyer Venezia	87
Olimpia Milano	94 (OT)

== Matches ==
=== Semifinals ===
19 September 2026
18:00 (CEST)

Report

Derthona Basket	90–98	Reyer Venezia

Nova Arena, Tortona

19 September 2026
20:45 (CEST)

Report

Olimpia Milano	80–71	Virtus Bologna

Nova Arena, Tortona

=== Final ===
20 September 2026
18:00 (CEST)

Report

Reyer Venezia	87–94 (OT)	Olimpia Milano
Scoring by quarter: 8–22, 24–20, 22–14, 25–23, Overtime: 8–15

Nova Arena, Tortona

== Format ==
The competition was played in a Final Four knockout format between the teams qualified from the previous LBA season and the 2026 Italian Basketball Cup.

== Qualified teams ==
The following four teams qualified for the tournament:

- Olimpia Milano (2025–26 LBA Champions)
- Reyer Venezia
- Derthona Basket (Host)
- Virtus Bologna

== Bracket ==
Semifinals; 19 September
Derthona Basket	90
Reyer Venezia	98
Olimpia Milano	80
Virtus Bologna	71

Final; 20 September
Reyer Venezia	87
Olimpia Milano	94

== Semifinals ==
=== Derthona Basket vs. Reyer Venezia ===
19 September 2026
17:00 (CEST)

Derthona Basket	90–98	Reyer Venezia

Tortona
Attendance: 4,403 (total day)

=== Olimpia Milano vs. Virtus Bologna ===
19 September 2026
19:45 (CEST)

Olimpia Milano	80–71	Virtus Bologna

Tortona
Attendance: 4,403 (total day)

== Final ==
=== Reyer Venezia vs. Olimpia Milano ===
20 September 2026
18:00 (CEST)

Reyer Venezia	87–94	Olimpia Milano

Tortona
