= 2025–26 LKL season =

33rd season of the top-tier level professional basketball league of Lithuania

Betsson-LKL
- Season: 2025–26
- Duration: 20 September 2025 – 17 May 2026 (Regular season); 20 May 2026 – 13 June 2026 (Playoffs)
- Games played: 166
- Teams: 9

Regular season
- Season MVP: (Lithuania) Arnas Velička

Finals
- Champions: Žalgiris (26th title)
- Runners-up: Juventus
- Third place: Neptūnas
- Fourth place: Lietkabelis
- Finals MVP: (Lithuania) Ąžuolas Tubelis

Awards
- Breakthrough of the Year: (Lithuania) Lukas Kreišmontas
- Coach of the Year: (Lithuania) Tomas Masiulis

Statistical leaders
Points	(United States) Cedric Henderson	18.1
Rebounds	(Lithuania) Artūras Gudaitis	7.3
Assists	(Lithuania) Arnas Velička	7.1
Index Rating	(Lithuania) Arnas Velička	20.1

Records
- Biggest home win: Žalgiris 108–71 Gargždai (7 December 2025)
- Biggest away win: Jonava Hipocredit 71–105 Rytas (22 November 2025)
- Highest scoring: Jonava Hipocredit 117–124 Neptūnas (7 December 2025)
- Winning streak: 27 games Žalgiris
- Losing streak: 11 games Juventus
- Highest attendance: 13,538; Žalgiris 79–75 Rytas (2 November 2025)
- Lowest attendance: 520; Jonava Hipocredit 95–90 Gargždai (17 February 2026)

Seasons
- ← 2024–25 2026–27 →

The 2025–26 Lietuvos krepšinio lyga season, also called Betsson–LKL for sponsorship reasons, was the 33rd season of the top-tier level professional basketball league of Lithuania, the Lietuvos krepšinio lyga (LKL). Žalgiris successfully defended the championship after suffering just one loss throughout the whole season and swapping finals debutants Juventus 3–0. Rytas Vilnius suffered the worst finish in club history during the season, being eliminated by Juventus in the quarter-finals, failing to reach at least the semifinals for the first time in club and league history.

== Teams ==
9 teams participated in the 2025–26 season. Two teams dropped out from the league during the summer period - M Basket-Delamode due to financial struggles decided to compete in NKL, while Wolves Twinsbet due to failing to meet club's set ambitions and changes in gambling laws in Lithuania decided to suspend basketball activities altogether. Because of dropouts, the league decided to invite Gargždai, a phoenix club of team which last time competed in the 2023–24 season. Despite the changed number of teams, the format remained mostly the same as the last season, with 9 teams facing-off each other 4 times with top 8 teams advancing into Playoffs.

Location of teams in 2025–26 LKL

Team	Location	Arena	Capacity	Last season
Gargždai	Gargždai	Gargždų Arena	1,400	—
Jonava Hipocredit	Jonava	Jonava Arena	2,200	4th
Juventus	Utena	Utena Arena	2,500	6th
Lietkabelis	Panevėžys	Kalnapilio Arena	5,950	3rd place, bronze medalist(s)
Neptūnas	Klaipėda	Švyturys Arena	6,200	8th
Nevėžis-Paskolų klubas	Kėdainiai	Kėdainiai Arena	2,200	9th
Rytas	Vilnius	Arena Vilnius	10,000	2nd place, silver medalist(s)
Rytas	Vilnius	Active Vilnius Arena	2,500	2nd place, silver medalist(s)
Šiauliai	Šiauliai	Šiauliai Arena	5,700	7th
Žalgiris	Kaunas	Žalgiris Arena	15,415	1st place, gold medalist(s)

=== Personnel and kits ===
Team	Head coach	Captain	Kit manufacturer	Shirt sponsor (chest)
Gargždai	(Lithuanian Basketball Federation) Tomas Rinkevičius	(Lithuanian Basketball Federation) Deividas Gailius	Hustle Point	7bet
Jonava Hipocredit	(Lithuanian Basketball Federation) Steponas Babrauskas	(Lithuanian Basketball Federation) Lukas Kreišmontas	AGO	Dafta, Jonava, Hipocredit, Litas
Juventus	(Lithuanian Basketball Federation) Laimonas Eglinskas	(Lithuania) Šarūnas Beniušis	Hustle Point	Umaras, Uniclub Casino, Utenos mėsa
Lietkabelis	(Basketball Federation of Serbia) Nenad Čanak	(Lithuania) Vytenis Lipkevičius	AGO	7bet, Lietkabelis, Norfa
Neptūnas	(Lithuanian Basketball Federation) Gediminas Petrauskas	(Lithuania) Martynas Pacevičius	Puma	7bet, Klaipėdos konteinerių terminalas (KKT), Amberton Hotel Group
Nevėžis–Paskolų klubas	(Lithuanian Basketball Federation) Matas Juzeliūnas	(Lithuania) Ignas Vaitkus	AGO	Autotoja, Optibet, Paskolų klubas
Rytas	(Lithuanian Basketball Federation) Giedrius Žibėnas	(Lithuania) Artūras Gudaitis	AGO	Olybet, Utenos nealkoholinis
Šiauliai	(Lithuanian Basketball Federation) Darius Songaila	(Lithuania) Vaidas Kariniauskas	Valorus	Casino admiral
Žalgiris	(Lithuanian Basketball Federation) Tomas Masiulis	(Lithuania) Edgaras Ulanovas	Puma	Go3, payabl.

=== Managerial changes ===
Team	Outgoing manager	Manner of departure	Date of vacancy	Position in table	Replaced with	Date of appointment
Neptūnas	(Lithuanian Basketball Federation) Vidas Ginevičius (interim)	End of caretaker spell	26 May 2025	Pre-season	(Lithuanian Basketball Federation) Gediminas Petrauskas	3 June 2025
Žalgiris	(Italian Basketball Federation) Andrea Trinchieri	Parted ways	23 June 2025	Pre-season	(Lithuanian Basketball Federation) Tomas Masiulis	28 June 2025
Nevėžis-Paskolų klubas	(Lithuanian Basketball Federation) Gediminas Petrauskas	End of contract	3 June 2025	Pre-season	(Lithuanian Basketball Federation) Laimonas Eglinskas	29 June 2025
Šiauliai	(Lithuanian Basketball Federation) Darius Pakamanis (interim)	End of caretaker spell	27 May 2025	Pre-season	(Lithuanian Basketball Federation) Darius Songaila	3 July 2025
Gargždai	(Lithuanian Basketball Federation) Povilas Šakinis	End of contract	25 Apr 2025	Pre-season	(Lithuanian Basketball Federation) Tomas Rinkevičius	18 July 2025
Jonava Hipocredit	(Lithuanian Basketball Federation) Mantas Šernius	Signed by Žalgiris	28 June 2025	Pre-season	(Lithuanian Basketball Federation) Paulius Juodis	29 July 2025
Jonava Hipocredit	(Lithuanian Basketball Federation) Paulius Juodis	Mutual agreement	7 October 2025	9th (0–4)	(Lithuanian Basketball Federation) Steponas Babrauskas (Note: Babrauskas was initially named as interim head coach, before being appointed on a permanent basis on 21 October 2025.)	7 October 2025; 21 October 2025
Nevėžis-Paskolų klubas	(Lithuanian Basketball Federation) Laimonas Eglinskas	Fired	16 April 2026	8th (8–17)	(Lithuanian Basketball Federation) Matas Juzeliūnas	16 April 2026
Juventus	(Lithuanian Basketball Federation) Kęstutis Kemzūra	Resigned	20 April 2026	7th (8–17)	(Lithuanian Basketball Federation) Ugnius Nikitinas (interim)	20 April 2026
Juventus	(Lithuanian Basketball Federation) Ugnius Nikitinas (interim)	End of caretaker spell	21 April 2026	8th (8–18)	(Lithuanian Basketball Federation) Laimonas Eglinskas	21 April 2026

== Regular season ==
=== League table ===
Pos	Team	Pld	W	L	PF	PA	PD	Qualification or relegation
1	Žalgiris	32	31	1	2920	2457	+463	Advance to playoffs
2	Rytas	32	20	12	2970	2730	+240	Advance to playoffs
3	Neptūnas	32	17 (Note: Neptūnas are ahead of Šiauliai on head-to-head points difference: Neptūnas +18; Šiauliai -18.)	15	2969	2889	+80	Advance to playoffs
4	Šiauliai	32	17	15	2729	2802	−73	Advance to playoffs
5	Lietkabelis	32	15 (Note: Lietkabelis are ahead of Gargždai on head-to-head points difference: Lietkabelis +16; Gargždai -16.)	17	2668	2586	+82	Advance to playoffs
6	Gargždai	32	15	17	2680	2797	−117	Advance to playoffs
7	Juventus	32	12	20	2797	2896	−99	Advance to playoffs
8	Jonava Hipocredit	32	9	23	2730	2999	−269	Advance to playoffs
9	Nevėžis-Paskolų klubas	32	8	24	2654	2961	−307	

Source: LKL.lt
Rules for classification: 1) Win–loss record; 2) Percentage of wins; 3) Head–to–head record; 4) Head–to–head percentage of wins; 5) Head–to–head point difference; 6) Head–to–head points scored; 7) Point difference; 8) Points scored; 9) Lottery draw (Note: Head–to–head record is used only after all the matches between the teams in question have been played)

=== Results ===
Home \ Away	GAR	JON	JUV	LIE	NEP	NEV	RYT	SIA	ZAL
Gargždai	—	103–73	91–74	80–89	87–104	86–79	82–78	85–93	73–89
Gargždai	—	104–109	89–82	64–89	81–70	88–81	103–98	78–81	63–69
Jonava Hipocredit	75–82	—	82–98	85–96	117–124	86–82	71–105	79–85	78–87
Jonava Hipocredit	95–90	—	90–95	69–67	81–64	90–89	84–101	86–70	84–101
Juventus	104–78	104–95	—	82–73	90–97	84–90	85–92	86–73	75–91
Juventus	98–103	85–86	—	80–83	102–91	76–92	82–87	87–82	83–94
Lietkabelis	70–79	101–74	89–83	—	84–96	100–76	89–84	80–86	77–81
Lietkabelis	69–78	91–80	91–69	—	83–80	105–72	96–71	75–77	82–94
Neptūnas	102–74	117–113	85–72	97–87	—	113–82	95–87	101–103	71–84
Neptūnas	91–97	95–89	95–89	96–87	—	88–93	91–98	98–83	90–93
Nevėžis-Paskolų klubas	94–87	83–85	79–96	77–69	85–92	—	64–82	107–93	68–94
Nevėžis-Paskolų klubas	85–90	88–85	95–98	81–80	82–110	—	88–117	87–88	67–91
Rytas	99–73	104–72	96–99	73–84	97–93	104–74	—	94–79	81–90
Rytas	98–77	98–81	102–80	96–81	100–95	105–91	—	102–72	70–75
Šiauliai	83–94	93–78	102–108	87–80	89–85	98–95	100–105	—	71–75
Šiauliai	83–73	96–77	97–90	67–64	81–90	95–75	107–90	—	78–91
Žalgiris	108–71	104–91	98–68	85–87	112–77	88–73	79–75	93–72	—
Žalgiris	85–77	97–90	108–93	87–70	87–76	98–80	98–81	94–65	—

Source: LKL.lt
Legend: Blue = home team win; Red = away team win.
Matches with lighter background shading were decided after overtime.

== Playoffs ==
Quarterfinals will be played in a best–of–three format, while the semifinals, third place game and final in a best-of-five format.

=== Bracket ===
Quarterfinals
1	Žalgiris	102	90	–	2
8	Jonava Hipocredit	82	75	–	0
4	Šiauliai	84	77	–	0
5	Lietkabelis	85	93	–	2
2	Rytas	84	95	–	0
7	Juventus	92	101	–	2
3	Neptūnas	100	84	–	2
6	Gargždai	73	74	–	0

Semifinals
1	Žalgiris	85	95	103	–	–	3
5	Lietkabelis	75	75	93	–	–	0
7	Juventus	96	86	84	103	–	3
3	Neptūnas	83	83	102	90	–	1

Finals
1	Žalgiris	107	100	95	–	–	3
7	Juventus	75	69	77	–	–	0
Third place
5	Lietkabelis	73	80	63	82	–	1
3	Neptūnas	86	68	66	91	–	3

2025–26 LKL champions
Žalgiris
(26th title)

== Final standings ==
Pos	Team	Pld	W	L	Qualification or relegation
1	Žalgiris (C)	40	39	1	Already qualified to EuroLeague
2	Juventus	41	17	24	Qualification to Champions League regular season
3	Neptūnas	42	23	19	Qualification to EuroCup
4	Lietkabelis	41	18	23	Qualification to EuroCup
5	Rytas	34	20	14	Qualification to Champions League regular season
6	Šiauliai	34	17	17	Qualification to EuroCup
7	Gargždai	34	15	19	
8	Jonava Hipocredit	34	9	25	
9	Nevėžis-Paskolų klubas	32	8	24	

Source: LKL.lt
(C) Champions

== Attendances to arenas ==
=== Average attendances ===
Pos	Team	Total	High	Low	Average	Change
1	Žalgiris	100,031	13,538	783	4,763	−9.1%
2	Rytas	47,378	9,186	1,285	2,786	−19.8%
3	Šiauliai	42,425	5,146	1,314	2,495	+10.7%
4	Neptūnas	49,031	4,449	1,381	2,334	+2.5%
5	Lietkabelis	38,984	5,181	898	1,949	−1.9%
6	Juventus	32,823	3,124	843	1,641	+17.7%
7	Nevėžis-Paskolų klubas	21,358	2,389	938	1,334	+15.2%
8	Gargždai	22,217	1,500	823	1,306	n/a^{1}
9	Jonava Hipocredit	16,099	2,200	520	947	−26.0%
	League total	370,346	13,538	520	2,231	−3.8%

Source: LKL.lt
Notes:
1: Team made its debut.

== Statistics ==
As of 13 June 2026

Source: LKL.lt

=== Performance Index Rating ===
Rank	Player	Club	Games	Rating	PIR
1.	(Lithuania) Arnas Velička	Neptūnas	41	810	19.8
2.	(Lithuania) Artūras Gudaitis	Rytas	28	522	18.6
3.	(Latvia) Rihards Lomažs	Neptūnas	41	734	17.9
4.	(United States) Jerrick Harding	Rytas	24	406	16.9
5.	(Lithuania) Lukas Uleckas	Juventus	40	666	16.7

=== Points ===
Rank	Player	Club	Games	Points	PPG
1.	(United States) Cedric Henderson	Šiauliai	31	562	18.1
2.	(United States) Jerrick Harding	Rytas	24	412	17.2
3.	(Latvia) Rihards Lomažs	Neptūnas	41	674	16.4
4.	(United States) Justin Turner	Gargždai	22	355	16.1
5.	(Estonia) Kristian Kullamäe	Lietkabelis	41	655	16

=== Rebounds ===
Rank	Player	Club	Games	Rebounds	RPG
1.	(Lithuania) Artūras Gudaitis	Rytas	28	205	7.3
2.	(Canada) (Republic of the Congo) J.D. Muila	Nevėžis–Paskolų klubas	30	218	7.3
3.	(Lithuania) Paulius Danusevičius	Lietkabelis	40	281	7
4.	(Lithuania) Lukas Uleckas	Juventus	40	253	6.3
5.	(Lithuania) Oskaras Pleikys	Šiauliai	34	210	6.2

=== Assists ===
Rank	Player	Club	Games	Assists	APG
1.	(Lithuania) Arnas Velička	Neptūnas	41	289	7
2.	(United States) Makai Ashton-Langford	Jonava Hipocredit	30	170	5.7
3.	(United States) Nigel Williams-Goss	Žalgiris	23	128	5.6
4.	(United States) Speedy Smith	Rytas	19	93	4.9
5.	(France) (United States) Sylvain Francisco	Žalgiris	30	142	4.7

=== Individual game highs ===
Category	Player	Club	Opponent	Statistic
PIR	(Lithuania) Ignas Sargiūnas	Rytas	Lietkabelis (Mar 22, 2026)	58
Points	(Lithuania) Ignas Sargiūnas	Rytas	Lietkabelis (Mar 22, 2026)	43
Rebounds	(Lithuania) Lukas Uleckas	Juventus	Neptūnas (May 2, 2026)	15
Assists	(United States) Makai Ashton-Langford	Jonava Hipocredit	Gargždai (May 2, 2026)	15
Assists	(Lithuania) Arnas Velička	Neptūnas	Rytas (Jan 31, 2026)	15
Steals	(Lithuania) Arnas Velička	Neptūnas	Lietkabelis (Jan 24, 2026)	5
Steals	(United States) Lesley Varner	Jonava Hipocredit	Žalgiris (Feb 1, 2026)	5
Steals	(United States) Trenton McLaughlin	Nevėžis–Paskolų klubas	Rytas (Dec 6, 2025)	5
Steals	(United States) Dayvion McKnight	Šiauliai	Jonava Hipocredit (Apr 3, 2026)	5
Steals	(Lithuania) Evaldas Šaulys	Juventus	Nevėžis–Paskolų klubas (May 9, 2026)	5
Steals	(Latvia) Rihards Lomažs	Neptūnas	Jonava Hipocredit (May 17, 2026)	5
Steals	(United States) Makai Ashton-Langford	Jonava Hipocredit	Žalgiris (May 22, 2026)	5
Blocks	(United States) Maxwell Lewis	Juventus	Žalgiris (Jun 9, 2026)	4
Blocks	(United States) (Cyprus) Moses Wright	Žalgiris	Gargždai (Dec 7, 2025)	4
Blocks	(United States) (North Macedonia) Jacob Wiley	Rytas	Nevėžis–Paskolų klubas (Sep 21, 2025)	4

=== Other statistics ===
Category	Player	Club	Games	Average
Steals	(United States) Dayvion McKnight	Šiauliai	32	1.4
Blocks	(United States) Maxwell Lewis	Juventus	19	1.2
Turnovers	(Lithuania) Arnas Velička	Neptūnas	41	3
Fouls drawn	(Lithuania) Arnas Velička	Neptūnas	41	6
Minutes	(United States) Justin Turner	Gargždai	22	30:47
FT %	(United States) Kenny Chery	Juventus	23	100%
2-Point %	(Lithuania) Šarūnas Beniušis	Juventus	41	75.7%
3-Point %	(Lithuania) Lukas Kreišmontas	Jonava Hipocredit	28	48.2%

=== Club statistics ===
Category	Club	Average
PIR	Žalgiris	114.4
Points	Rytas	92.6
Rebounds	Žalgiris	38
Assists	Žalgiris	23.4
Steals	Šiauliai	7.3
Blocks	Rytas	4
Turnovers	Nevėžis–Paskolų klubas	14.1
FT %	Rytas	76.6%
2-Point %	Žalgiris	60.9%
3-Point %	Žalgiris	37.7%

== Awards ==
All official awards of the 2025–26 LKL season.

=== Regular Season MVP ===
Pos.	Player	Team	Source
PG	(Lithuania) Arnas Velička	Neptūnas	

=== LKL Finals MVP ===
Pos.	Player	Team	Source
PF/C	(Lithuania) Ąžuolas Tubelis	Žalgiris	

=== Breakthrough of the Year ===
Player	Team	Source
(Lithuania) Lukas Kreišmontas	Jonava Hipocredit	

=== Coach of the Year ===
Coach	Team	Source
(Lithuania) Tomas Masiulis	Žalgiris	

=== All-LKL Team ===
Pos.	Player	Team	Source
PG	(Lithuania) Arnas Velička	Neptūnas	
SG	(Latvia) Rihards Lomažs	Neptūnas	
SF	(United States) Cedric Henderson Jr.	Šiauliai	
PF	(Lithuania) Ąžuolas Tubelis	Žalgiris	
C	(Lithuania) Artūras Gudaitis	Rytas	

=== MVP of the Month ===
Month	Player	Team	PIR	Source
2025
September–October	(Lithuania) Artūras Gudaitis	Rytas	22	
November	(United States) Augustine Rubit	Lietkabelis	25.3	
December	(Lithuania) Arnas Velička	Neptūnas	26.7	
2026
January	(United States) Jerrick Harding	Rytas	28.3	
February	(United States) Cedric Henderson Jr.	Šiauliai	25	
March	(Lithuania) Ignas Sargiūnas	Rytas	33	
April	(Lithuania) Arnas Velička	Neptūnas	23.5	
May	(Lithuania) Gytis Masiulis	Rytas	23.3	

== LKL clubs in international competitions ==
Euroleague Basketball competitions
Team	Competition	Progress	Result	W–L
Žalgiris	EuroLeague	Regular season	5th place out of 20 teams (23–15)	24–18
Žalgiris	EuroLeague	Playoffs	Loss vs. (Turkey) Fenerbahçe Beko (1–3)	24–18
Lietkabelis	EuroCup	Regular season Group B	9th place out of 10 teams	5–13
Neptūnas	EuroCup	Regular season Group A	8th place out of 10 teams	7–11

FIBA competitions
Team	Competition	Progress	Result	W–L
Rytas	Champions League	Regular season Group A	1st place out of 4 teams (4–2)	12–4
Rytas	Champions League	Round of 16 Group I	1st place out of 4 teams (4–2)	12–4
Rytas	Champions League	Quarterfinals	Win vs. (Czech Republic) ERA Nymburk (2–0)	12–4
Rytas	Champions League	Semifinals	Win vs. (Spain) La Laguna Tenerife	12–4
Rytas	Champions League	Final	Win vs. (Hellenic Basketball Federation) AEK Betsson	12–4
Juventus	Champions League	Qualifying tournament 3 Quarter–finals	Win vs. (Finland) Karhu Kauhajoki	1–1
Juventus	Champions League	Qualifying tournament 3 Semi–finals	Loss vs. (Spain) UCAM Murcia	1–1
