= Moses Wright =

Macedonian-American basketball player (born 1998)

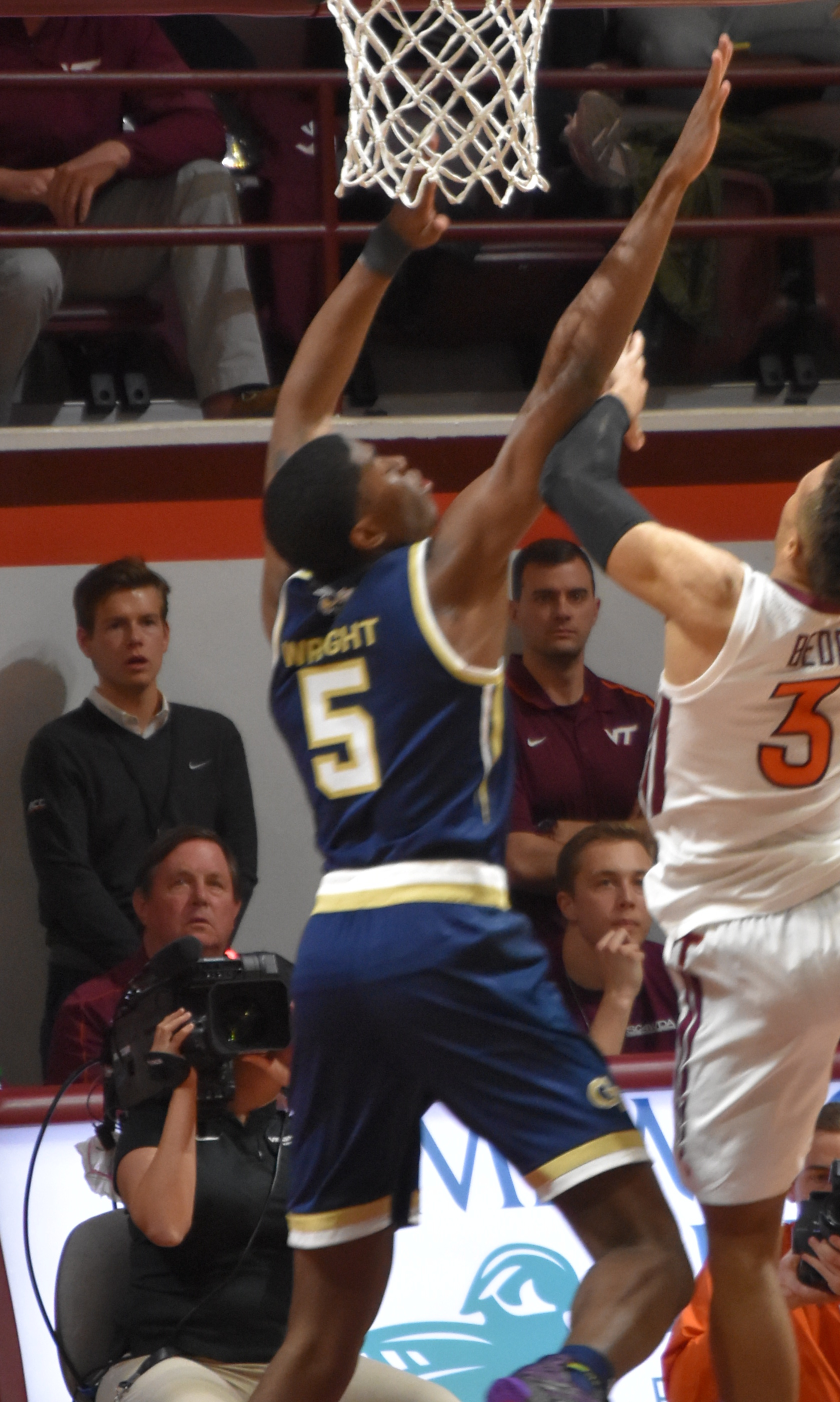
- Wright with Georgia Tech in 2019

No. 5 – Olimpia Milano
- Position: Center / power forward
- League: LBA; EuroLeague

Personal information
- Born: December 23, 1998 (age 27) Raleigh, North Carolina, U.S.
- Listed height: 6 ft 9 in (2.06 m)
- Listed weight: 230 lb (104 kg)

Career information
- High school: Enloe (Raleigh, North Carolina)
- College: Georgia Tech (2017–2021)
- NBA draft: 2021: undrafted
- Playing career: 2021–present

Career history
- 2021–2022: Agua Caliente Clippers
- 2021: Los Angeles Clippers
- 2022: Dallas Mavericks
- 2022: →Texas Legends
- 2022–2023: Zhejiang Golden Bulls
- 2023: Shanxi Loongs
- 2023–2024: Merkezefendi
- 2024–2025: Olympiacos
- 2025–2026: Žalgiris Kaunas
- 2026–present: Olimpia Milano

Career highlights
- Italian Supercup winner (2026); Italian Supercup MVP (2026); LKL champion (2026); King Mindaugas Cup winner (2026); King Mindaugas Cup MVP (2026); Greek League champion (2025); Greek Cup winner (2024); Greek Super Cup winner (2024); All-NBA G League First Team (2022); ACC Player of the Year (2021); First-team All-ACC (2021); ACC All-Defensive team (2021)
- Stats at NBA.com
- Stats at Basketball Reference

Moses Anthony Wright (born December 23, 1998) is a Macedonian-American professional basketball player for Olimpia Milano of the Lega Basket Serie A (LBA) and the EuroLeague. He played college basketball for the Georgia Tech Yellow Jackets. He is also known as Wright the Right.

== Early life ==
Wright grew up swimming and playing tennis. He did not play basketball until he was entering high school. Wright attended Enloe High School in Raleigh, North Carolina, where he played on the junior varsity team for his first two years. He competed for the Raleigh Hawks, a homeschool team, as a junior before making Enloe's varsity team in his senior season. He averaged 21.5 points, 13.5 rebounds and 1.5 blocks per game per game as a senior. He committed to playing college basketball for Georgia Tech. He was lightly recruited by NCAA Division I programs and not ranked by major recruiting services.

== College career ==
Wright averaged 3.6 points and 3.4 rebounds per game in his freshman season at Georgia Tech. On March 12, 2019, he recorded a sophomore season-high 25 points and seven rebounds in a 78–71 loss to Notre Dame at the first round of the ACC tournament. As a sophomore, Wright averaged 6.7 points and 3.7 rebounds per game. On February 22, 2020, he posted a career-high 33 points and 10 rebounds in a 79–72 loss to Syracuse. In his junior season, he averaged 13 points and seven rebounds per game. On November 25, he registered 31 points and 20 rebounds in a 123–120 loss to Georgia State in quadruple overtime.

On March 8, 2021, Wright was named the ACC Player of the Year and first-team All-ACC for his senior season. He missed the NCAA tournament round of 64 game against Loyola Chicago after testing positive for COVID-19. As a senior, he averaged 17.4 points, 8 rebounds, 2.3 assists, 1.5 steals and 1.6 blocks per game. On March 28, 2021, Wright declared for the 2021 NBA draft.

== Professional career ==
=== Los Angeles Clippers / Agua Caliente Clippers (2021–2022) ===
After going undrafted in the 2021 NBA draft, Wright joined the New Orleans Pelicans for the 2021 NBA Summer League and averaged 7.2 points, 4.4 rebounds and 1.4 blocks per game. On September 27, 2021, he signed with the Los Angeles Clippers. However, he was waived on October 14.

On October 27, Wright signed with the Agua Caliente Clippers as an affiliate player. In 13 games, he averaged 13.5 points and 8.5 rebounds in 29.7 minutes.

On December 21, 2021, Wright signed a ten-day contract with the Los Angeles Clippers.

On December 31, 2021, Wright was reacquired and activated by the Agua Caliente Clippers of the NBA G League.

=== Dallas Mavericks / Texas Legends (2021–2022) ===
On February 24, 2022, Wright signed a two-way contract with the Dallas Mavericks.

In April 2022, Wright was awarded All NBA G League First Team.

=== Zheijang Golden Bulls (2022–2023) ===
On July 28, 2022, Wright signed with the Zhejiang Golden Bulls of the Chinese Basketball Association.

In July 2023, Wright made the 2023 NBA Summer League debut for the Toronto Raptors.

=== Merkezefendi Belediyesi (2023–2024) ===
On December 16, 2023, Wright signed with Merkezefendi Belediyesi of the Turkish Basketbol Süper Ligi (BSL).

=== Olympiacos Piraeus (2024–2025) ===
On January 26, 2024, Wright signed with Olympiacos of the Greek Basketball League (GBL) and the EuroLeague through the summer of 2025.

On October 16, 2024, Wright received the Hoops Agents Player of the Week award for Round 2 of the domestic league, putting up a stat sheet of 23 points and 7 rebounds.

On December 6, 2024, it was announced that Wright had been ruled out for the rest of the season due to unspecified health concerns. On March 25, 2025, he returned to active status in a EuroLeague match against ASVEL Basket.

On June 11, 2025, Wright announced his departure from the Greek club, thanking the team and the fans for their support throughout his injury spell.

=== Žalgiris Kaunas (2025–2026) ===
On June 30, 2025, Wright signed one–year deal with Žalgiris Kaunas of the Lithuanian Basketball League (LKL) and the EuroLeague. On February 14, 2026, Wright received a Hoops Agents Player of the Week award. He had the game-high 25 points and 6 rebounds in his team's win.

=== Olimpia Milano (2026–present) ===
On July 24, 2026, Wright signed with Olimpia Milano of the Lega Basket Serie A (LBA) and the EuroLeague. In November 2026, Wright faced disciplinary action from interim head coach Marco Ramondino after being late to the pregame meeting.

== Career statistics ==
Legend
GP	Games played	GS	Games started	MPG	Minutes per game
FG%	Field-goal percentage	3P%	3-point field-goal percentage	FT%	Free-throw percentage
RPG	Rebounds per game	APG	Assists per game	SPG	Steals per game
BPG	Blocks per game	PPG	Points per game	PIR	Performance index rating
**Bold**	Career high

=== NBA ===
==== Regular season ====
Year	Team	GP	GS	MPG	FG%	3P%	FT%	RPG	APG	SPG	BPG	PPG
2021–22	L.A. Clippers	1	0	1.0	—	—	—	—	**1.0**	—	—	0.0
2021–22	Dallas	**3**	0	**4.3**	**.250**	.000	**1.000**	**1.0**	.3	—	**.3**	**1.7**
Career		4	0	3.5	.250	.000	1.000	.8	.5	—	.3	1.3

=== EuroLeague ===
Year	Team	GP	GS	MPG	FG%	3P%	FT%	RPG	APG	SPG	BPG	PPG	PIR
2023–24	Olympiacos	17	2	13.9	**.703**	**.500**	.615	2.9	.5	**.9**	.6	8.1	10.2
2024–25	Olympiacos	18	4	12.8	.533	.167	.686	2.6	.6	.5	.4	5.8	6.3
2025–26	Žalgiris Kaunas	**42**	**29**	**23.6**	.601	.306	**.733**	**6.5**	**.8**	.6	**.9**	**13.2**	**17.1**
Career		77	35	19.0	.606	.304	.700	4.8	.7	.7	.7	10.4	13.1

=== Domestic leagues ===
Year	Team	League	GP	MPG	FG%	3P%	FT%	RPG	APG	SPG	BPG	PPG
2021–22	(United States) A. C. Clippers	G League	17	30.9	.592	.423	.676	8.8	1.5	.8	1.6	17.6
2021–22	(United States) Texas Legends	G League	12	33.6	.531	.382	.639	9.8	1.6	.8	1.2	22.4
2022–23	(China) Zhejiang G. B.	CBA	49	20.8	.453	.240	.547	6.8	1.4	1.3	1.0	12.1
2023–24	(China) Shanxi Loongs	CBA	6	20.3	.449	.000	.455	6.5	1.5	.5	.5	12.8
2023–24	(Turkey) M. B. Denizli	TBSL	5	33.3	.576	.250	.697	8.4	1.2	1.4	1.4	26.4
2023–24	(Greece) Olympiacos	GBL	11	20.8	.642	.000	.628	5.7	.9	.3	.8	11.9
2024–25	(Greece) Olympiacos	GBL	7	17.6	.673	.500	.556	5.4	.7	.3	1.0	11.7
2025–26	(Lithuania) Žalgiris	LKL	34	17.9	.644	.214	.657	4.6	1.0	.4	1.0	10.2

=== College ===
Year	Team	GP	GS	MPG	FG%	3P%	FT%	RPG	APG	SPG	BPG	PPG
2017–18	Georgia Tech	25	10	16.6	.307	.065	.543	3.4	.7	.6	.5	3.6
2018–19	Georgia Tech	30	21	18.5	.470	.208	.489	3.7	.8	.4	.6	6.7
2019–20	Georgia Tech	**31**	**31**	30.4	.530	.241	.617	7.0	.9	.6	1.1	13.0
2020–21	Georgia Tech	25	25	**35.3**	**.532**	**.414**	**.658**	**8.0**	**2.3**	**1.5**	**1.6**	**17.4**
Career		111	87	25.2	.492	.230	.604	5.5	1.1	.8	1.0	10.2

== Personal life ==
Wright's father, Gerald, died of a heart attack in January 2012 after developing a staph infection following years of health issues. His mother, Calla, is a former music teacher for the Wake County Public School System.
