= Sylvain Francisco =

French-American basketball player (born 1997)

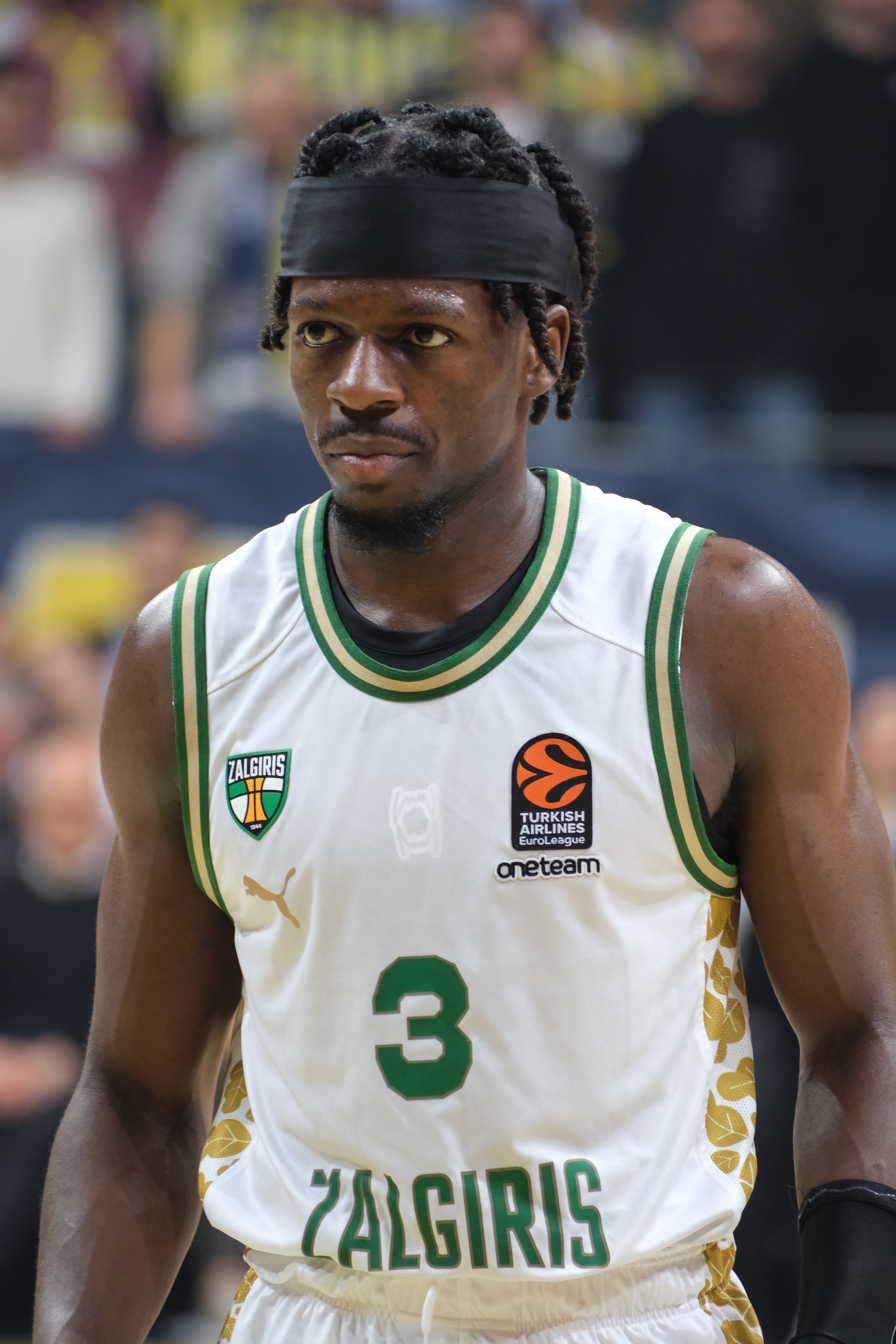
- Francisco with Žalgiris Kaunas in 2025

No. 3 – Panathinaikos
- Position: Point guard
- League: Greek Basketball League; EuroLeague

Personal information
- Born: 10 October 1997 (age 29) Créteil, France
- Listed height: 6 ft 1.25 in (1.86 m)
- Listed weight: 180 lb (82 kg)

Career information
- High school: Elev8 Sports Institute (Delray Beach, Florida); Liberty Christian Prep School (Tavares, Florida); West Oaks Academy (Orlando, Florida)
- NBA draft: 2019: undrafted
- Playing career: 2017–present

Career history
- 2017–2018: Metropolitans 92
- 2018–2020: Paris Basketball
- 2020–2021: Chorale Roanne
- 2021–2022: Baxi Manresa
- 2022–2023: Peristeri
- 2023–2024: FC Bayern Munich
- 2024–2026: Žalgiris Kaunas
- 2026–present: Panathinaikos

Career highlights
- All-EuroLeague First Team (2026); 2× LKL champion (2025, 2026); 2× Lithuanian Cup winner (2025, 2026); LKL Finals MVP (2025); All-LKL Team (2025); German Bundesliga champion (2024); German Cup winner (2024); German Cup MVP (2024); All-Greek League Team (2023)

Sylvain Francisco (born 10 October 1997) is a French-American professional basketball player for Panathinaikos of the Greek Basketball League (GBL) and the EuroLeague. He also represents the French national team in international competition. Francisco holds both French and American citizenship.

== Early life and career ==
Sylvain Francisco is of Angolan ethnicity, as his parents are from Angola. They left the country and moved to France, due to the country's civil war. Francisco, who was born in Créteil, France, grew up in the Paris area, along with eight siblings. He played youth club basketball with Paris Basket Racing, Villemomble Sports, and AL Roche-la-Molière.

He then pursued his secondary education in Florida, in the USA, in 2014. He played high school basketball at the Elev8 Sports Institute, in Delray Beach, during the 2014–15 season. He also played high school basketball with Liberty Christian Preparatory School, in Tavares, during the 2015–16 season, and at West Oaks Academy, in Orlando, during the 2016–17 season. After high school, Francisco got some offers to play college basketball from some NCAA Division I programs, but he opted instead to return to France to play professionally.

== Professional career ==
Francisco began his pro club career with Levallois Metropolitans in the French men's basketball first division. At the end of the 2017–2018 season, he signed his first professional contract with the Levallois club. However, wanting to join the G-League and eventually the NBA, he did not show up to the club's training the following summer. He finally signed with Paris Basketball in the LNB Pro B in December 2018. After two seasons with Paris Basketball, he returned to the French first division by signing with the Chorale Roanne for the 2020–2021 season.

=== Baxi Manresa (2021–2022) ===
Francisco left Roanne in June 2021, and signed with the Spanish club Baxi Manresa in Liga Endesa, in August 2021. In the summer of 2022, he participated in the NBA Summer League with the Milwaukee Bucks.

=== Peristeri (2022–2023) ===
For the 2022–2023 season, Francisco signed with Peristeri of the Greek Basket League. In 31 Greek national domestic league games, he averaged 12.6 points, 2.9 rebounds, 5.3 assists, 1.5 steals and 2.7 turnovers, playing around 28 minutes per contest. He also averaged 16.2 points, 2.1 rebounds, and 5.8 assists per game, in 9 games played in the European-wide secondary level FIBA Champions League's 2022–2023 season. On 29 June 2023, he parted ways with the Greek club.

=== FC Bayern Munich (2023–2024) ===
On 20 July 2023, he signed with FC Bayern Munich of the German Basketball Bundesliga (BBL) and EuroLeague. On 18 February 2024, he won the BBL-Pokal with Bayern following a win in the final over Ratiopharm Ulm. Francisco was named the Final Four MVP.

=== Žalgiris Kaunas (2024–2026) ===
On 1 July 2024, Francisco signed a two-year (1+1) deal with Žalgiris Kaunas of the Lithuanian Basketball League (LKL) and the EuroLeague.

On 1 March 2025, he was named a Euroleague Round 27 MVP, sharing the honor with Carlik Jones. He had 25 points, 6 rebounds, and 4 assists.

On 11 March 2025, Francisco signed a contract extension with the team until the 2026–27 season, with a clause allowing him to leave in the summer of 2026 for a buyout.

Francisco helped Žalgiris regain the LKL championship in June, with Žalgiris beating Rytas Vilnius 3–2 in the finals. In the fourth game, Francisco hit a game-winning, buzzer-beating three pointer to help Žalgiris win 84-83 and force the deciding fifth game. He was the LKL Finals MVP.

In October 2025, Francisco was named the EuroLeague MVP of the Month after leading Žalgiris to a 6–2 start to the 2025–26 season. He averaged 14.9 points and 6.8 assists while shooting 54.1% on two-pointers and 40.4% from three-point range.

On 25 February 2026, he recorded 23 points and 7 assists in a 99–94 double-overtime win against Olympiacos, and scored 10 points in overtime. On 24 April 2026, he was named to the All-EuroLeague First Team for the first time. On 13 June 2026, Francisco announced that he would be leaving Žalgiris.

=== Panathinaikos (2026–present) ===
On 30 June 2026, Francisco signed with LDLC ASVEL of the LNB Élite and the EuroLeague. However, shortly after his arrival, ASVEL encountered financial difficulties after a planned investment partnership failed to provide the guarantees required by the French basketball financial control authority (DNCCG). The club was forced to significantly reduce its projected budget for the 2026–27 season, creating uncertainty regarding several of its summer signings. As a result, Francisco left the club before making an official appearance for ASVEL.

On 30 July 2026, Francisco signed with Panathinaikos of the Greek Basketball League (GBL) and the EuroLeague.

== National team career ==
Francisco was a member of the junior French national teams. He played with France's junior national team at the 2016 FIBA U20 European Championship. On 24 February 2022, Francisco landed his first selection with the senior French national team, for the 2023 FIBA World Cup qualifiers. He also represented France at the 2023 FIBA World Cup and EuroBasket 2025.

== Career statistics ==
Legend
GP	Games played	GS	Games started	MPG	Minutes per game
FG%	Field-goal percentage	3P%	3-point field-goal percentage	FT%	Free-throw percentage
RPG	Rebounds per game	APG	Assists per game	SPG	Steals per game
BPG	Blocks per game	PPG	Points per game	PIR	Performance index rating
**Bold**	Career high

=== EuroLeague ===
Year	Team	GP	GS	MPG	FG%	3P%	FT%	RPG	APG	SPG	BPG	PPG	PIR
2023–24	Bayern Munich	33	0	19.3	.387	.354	**.814**	1.7	3.2	.7	—	10.6	10.7
2024–25	Žalgiris	34	18	25.3	**.479**	.342	.756	2.6	4.5	.4	.2	14.6	15.6
2025–26	Žalgiris	**42**	**35**	**27.4**	.435	**.386**	.799	**2.9**	**6.5**	**1.0**	**.3**	**16.5**	**19.2**
Career		109	53	24.2	.411	.364	.786	2.5	4.9	.9	.1	14.1	15.5

=== EuroCup ===
Year	Team	GP	GS	MPG	FG%	3P%	FT%	RPG	APG	SPG	BPG	PPG	PIR
2017–18	Metropolitans 92	10	2	16.6	.591	.500	.727	1.5	1.6	.4	.1	7.2	7.0
Career		10	2	16.6	.591	.500	.727	1.5	1.6	.4	.1	7.2	7.0

=== Basketball Champions League ===
Year	Team	GP	GS	MPG	FG%	3P%	FT%	RPG	APG	SPG	BPG	PPG
2021–22	Manresa	**16**	1	19.9	.390	.311	**.844**	1.8	3.2	1.1	.1	11.7
2022–23	Peristeri	9	**5**	**31.5**	**.447**	**.344**	.780	**2.1**	**5.8**	**1.8**	**.2**	**16.2**
Career		25	6	24.0	.412	.324	.808	1.9	4.1	1.4	.1	13.4

=== Domestic leagues ===
Year	Team	League	GP	MPG	FG%	3P%	FT%	RPG	APG	SPG	BPG	PPG
2017–18	(France) Metropolitans 92	Pro A	24	12.7	.280	.212	1.000	1.1	1.9	.4	.1	3.5
2018–19	(France) Paris	Pro B	26	23.5	.386	.353	.738	2.7	3.4	1.5	.1	9.6
2019–20	(France) Paris	Pro B	23	30.6	.386	.321	.716	3.5	5.5	1.9	.2	13.1
2020–21	(France) Chorale Roanne	LNB Élite	32	30.3	.425	.284	.707	2.9	4.7	1.9	.2	14.7
2021–22	(Spain) Manresa	ACB	30	18.1	.402	.342	.730	1.2	3.3	.9	.2	10.7
2022–23	(Greece) Peristeri	GBL	31	27.7	.409	.298	.690	2.9	5.3	1.5	.1	12.6
2023–24	(Germany) Bayern Munich	BBL	33	18.1	.467	.397	.794	1.7	3.2	1.1	—	11.7
2024–25	(Lithuania) Žalgiris	LKL	41	21.4	.586	.329	.806	2.5	5.5	1.0	.3	13.9
2025–26	(Lithuania) Žalgiris	LKL	30	19.1	.429	.388	.740	1.7	4.7	.8	.3	11.8
