= Ąžuolas Tubelis =

Lithuanian basketball player (born 2002)

- Tubelis with the Lithuania national team in 2026

No. 10 – Žalgiris Kaunas
- Position: Power forward / center
- League: LKL; EuroLeague

Personal information
- Born: 22 March 2002 (age 24) Vilnius, Lithuania
- Listed height: 2.09 m (6 ft 10 in)
- Listed weight: 245 lb (111 kg)

Career information
- College: Arizona (2020–2023)
- NBA draft: 2023: undrafted
- Playing career: 2018–present

Career history
- 2018–2020: Rytas Vilnius
- 2018–2020: →Perlas
- 2023–2025: Rytas Vilnius
- 2023–2024: →Neptūnas Klaipėda
- 2025–present: Žalgiris Kaunas

Career highlights
- LKL champion (2026); King Mindaugas Cup winner (2026); LKL MVP (2024); LKL Finals MVP (2026); 2× All-LKL Team (2024, 2026); Consensus second-team All-American (2023); 2× First-team All-Pac-12 (2022, 2023); Pac-12 All-Freshman Team (2021); Pac-12 tournament MOP (2023)
- Stats at Basketball Reference

Ąžuolas Tubelis (born 22 March 2002) is a Lithuanian professional basketball player for Žalgiris Kaunas of the Lithuanian Basketball League (LKL) and the EuroLeague. He played college basketball for the Arizona Wildcats of the Pac-12 Conference. A power forward, he was named first-team All-Pac-12 twice with the Wildcats.

== Youth career ==
In May 2018, Tubelis won the 2017–18 Adidas Next Generation Tournament (ANGT) with the U18 team of Lietuvos rytas Vilnius. On 18 October 2018, he signed a long-term contract with Rytas Vilnius. In the 2018–19 season, he played for Perlas in the National Basketball League (NKL), the second-tier league of Lithuania. He averaged 9.6 points, 3.7 rebounds and 1.4 steals per game. In February 2019, Tubelis played for Rytas' U18 team at ANGT Kaunas, where he was named to the all-tournament team after averaging 15.3 points, 6.5 rebounds, three steals and 2.8 blocks per game. In June 2019, Tubelis took part in the Basketball Without Borders Europe Camp in Riga.

In 2019–20, Tubelis split playing time between Perlas and Rytas' senior team, emerging as one of the top players in the NKL. He debuted for the senior team in a 6 October 2019 win over Juventus Utena. Tubelis scored an LKL season-high 11 points in a victory over Šiauliai on 1 February 2020. At ANGT Kaunas in February 2020, he averaged 20.5 points and 12.5 rebounds, leading Rytas' U18 team to first place and earning tournament most valuable player honors. Later that month, Tubelis participated in the Basketball Without Borders Global Camp at 2020 NBA All-Star Weekend in Chicago. In 25 NKL games, he averaged 16.4 points, 6.2 rebounds, 1.5 steals and 1.5 blocks per game.

== College career ==
On 27 May 2020, Tubelis committed to play college basketball for Arizona. He joined the team with his twin brother, Tautvilas. Tubelis was considered a four-star recruit by 247Sports.

On 2 February 2023, Tubelis posted a career-high 40 points and nine rebounds in an 91–76 win over Oregon. As a freshman, he averaged 12.2 points and 7.1 rebounds per game, and was named to the All-Pac-12 honorable mention and All-Freshman Team. Tubelis was named first-team All-Pac-12 as a sophomore and a junior. He declared for the NBA draft, but was not widely projected to be selected. According to Seth Davis of The Athletic, there were questions on his ability to switch onto smaller players away from the basket. ArizonaSports.com wrote that his slow footspeed could be a concern.

== Professional career ==
After going undrafted in the 2023 NBA draft, Tubelis joined the Philadelphia 76ers for the NBA Summer League. Afterwards, on 17 July 2023, he signed a two-way contract with the 76ers and their NBA G League affiliate, the Delaware Blue Coats. However, he was waived by the 76ers on 25 October.

On 8 November, he re-signed with Rytas Vilnius and then was loaned to Neptūnas Klaipėda of the Lithuanian Basketball League (LKL). On 14 May 2024, Tubelis received the LKL Most Valuable Player Award after averaging 17.5 points, 7 rebounds and 1.1 blocks during the regular season. He led Neptūnas to an eight-game winning streak which helped the team secure a playoff spot. In the 2024–2025 season, he was one of the leaders of Rytas.

On 18 July 2025, Tubelis signed three–year (2+1) contract with Žalgiris Kaunas of the Lithuanian Basketball League (LKL) and the EuroLeague.

== National team career ==
Tubelis played for Lithuania at the 2016 FIBA U16 European Championship in Radom, where he averaged 4.9 points and 4.3 rebounds per game. At the 2018 FIBA U16 European Championship in Novi Sad, he averaged 14.3 points, 10.4 rebounds and 2.7 blocks per game. Tubelis represented Lithuania at the 2019 FIBA U18 European Championship in Volos, averaging 14.9 points, 12.6 rebounds and 3.4 blocks per game.

Tubelis debuted in the Lithuania men's national basketball team during the 2024 FIBA Men's Olympic Qualifying Tournaments in San Juan, Puerto Rico and in four games averaged 4 points, 1.3 rebounds per game. Later he also represented Lithuania in the EuroBasket 2025 qualification and EuroBasket 2025. In 2025, Tubelis was for the first time included into the final roster of the Lithuania men's national basketball team during a major tournament – EuroBasket 2025 and by averaging 9.9 points, 7 rebounds, 1.4 assists per game he was one of the team leaders.

== Career statistics ==
Legend
GP	Games played	GS	Games started	MPG	Minutes per game
FG%	Field goal percentage	3P%	3-point field goal percentage	FT%	Free throw percentage
RPG	Rebounds per game	APG	Assists per game	SPG	Steals per game
BPG	Blocks per game	PPG	Points per game	**Bold**	Career high

=== College ===
Year	Team	GP	GS	MPG	FG%	3P%	FT%	RPG	APG	SPG	BPG	PPG
2020–21	Arizona	26	20	26.7	.498	.310	.692	7.1	1.2	.6	.6	12.2
2021–22	Arizona	**36**	**35**	24.6	.540	.263	.669	6.2	**2.3**	**1.1**	**.7**	13.9
2022–23	Arizona	35	34	**30.1**	**.570**	**.313**	**.764**	**9.1**	2.0	**1.1**	**.7**	**19.8**
Career		97	89	27.1	.544	.295	.714	7.5	1.9	1.0	.7	15.6

== Personal life ==
Tubelis has a twin brother, Tautvilas, who also currently plays basketball for the Arizona Wildcats and has represented Lithuania at the international level. Tubelis' first name, Ąžuolas, translates to oak in Lithuanian and was given to him by his grandfather.
