= Rihards Lomažs =

Latvian basketball player

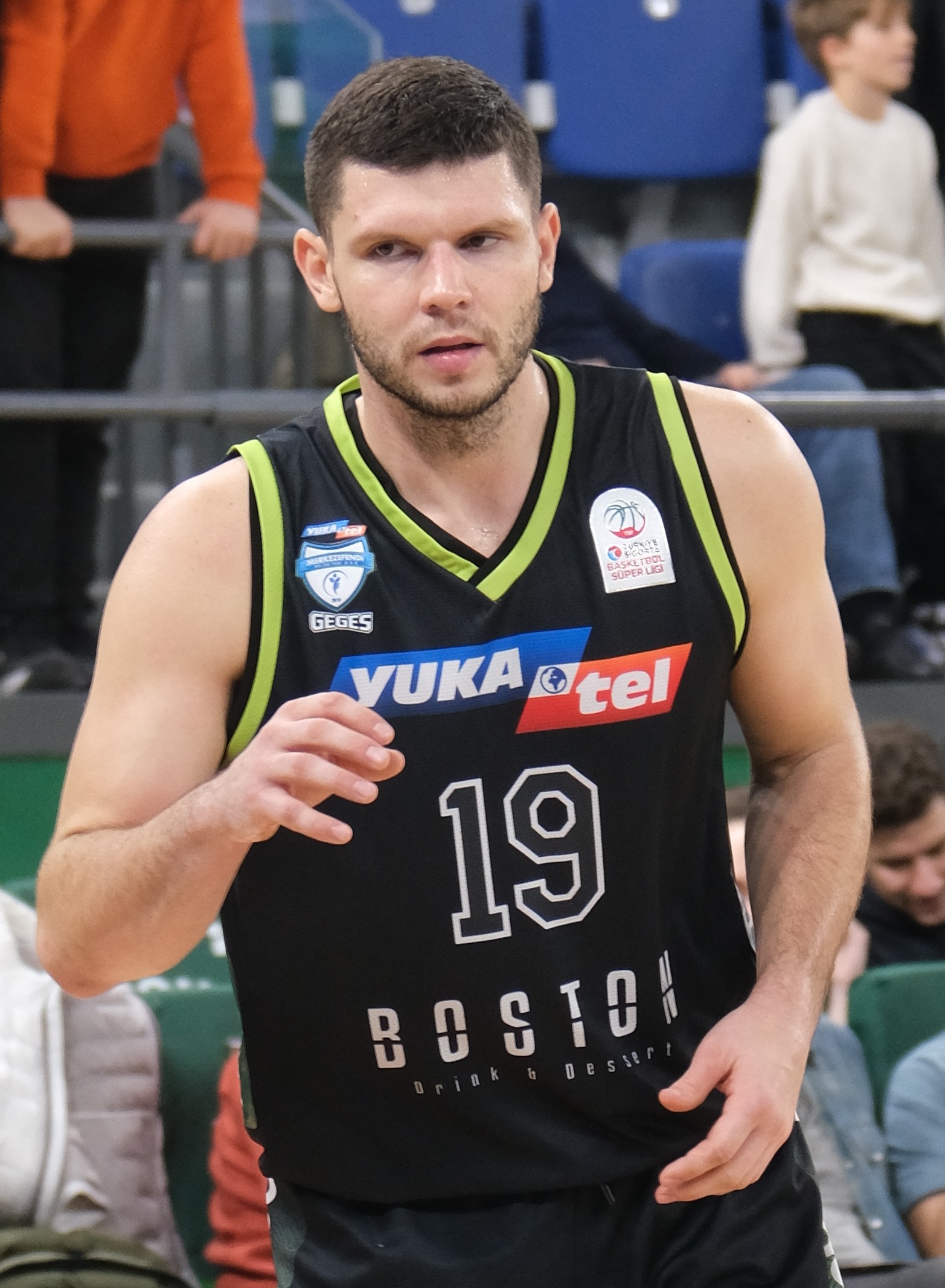
- Lomažs in 2024

No. 6 – Cedevita Olimpija
- Position: Shooting guard
- League: Slovenian League; ABA League; EuroCup

Personal information
- Born: 13 April 1996 (age 30) Tukums, Latvia
- Listed height: 6 ft 4 in (1.93 m)
- Listed weight: 192 lb (87 kg)

Career information
- NBA draft: 2018: undrafted
- Playing career: 2014–present

Career history
- 2014: Jelgava
- 2014–2015: Jūrmala
- 2015–2019: Ventspils
- 2019–2021: ASVEL
- 2021: BG Göttingen
- 2021–2022: Merkezefendi Basket
- 2022: Zaragoza
- 2022–2023: Baskets Oldenburg
- 2023: Merkezefendi Basket
- 2023–2024: Virtus Bologna
- 2024–2025: Merkezefendi Basket
- 2025: Telekom Baskets Bonn
- 2025–2026: Neptūnas Klaipėda
- 2026–present: Cedevita Olimpija

Career highlights
- Latvian–Estonian Basketball League champion (2019); Latvian–Estonian Basketball League Finals MVP (2019); All-LKL Team (2026)

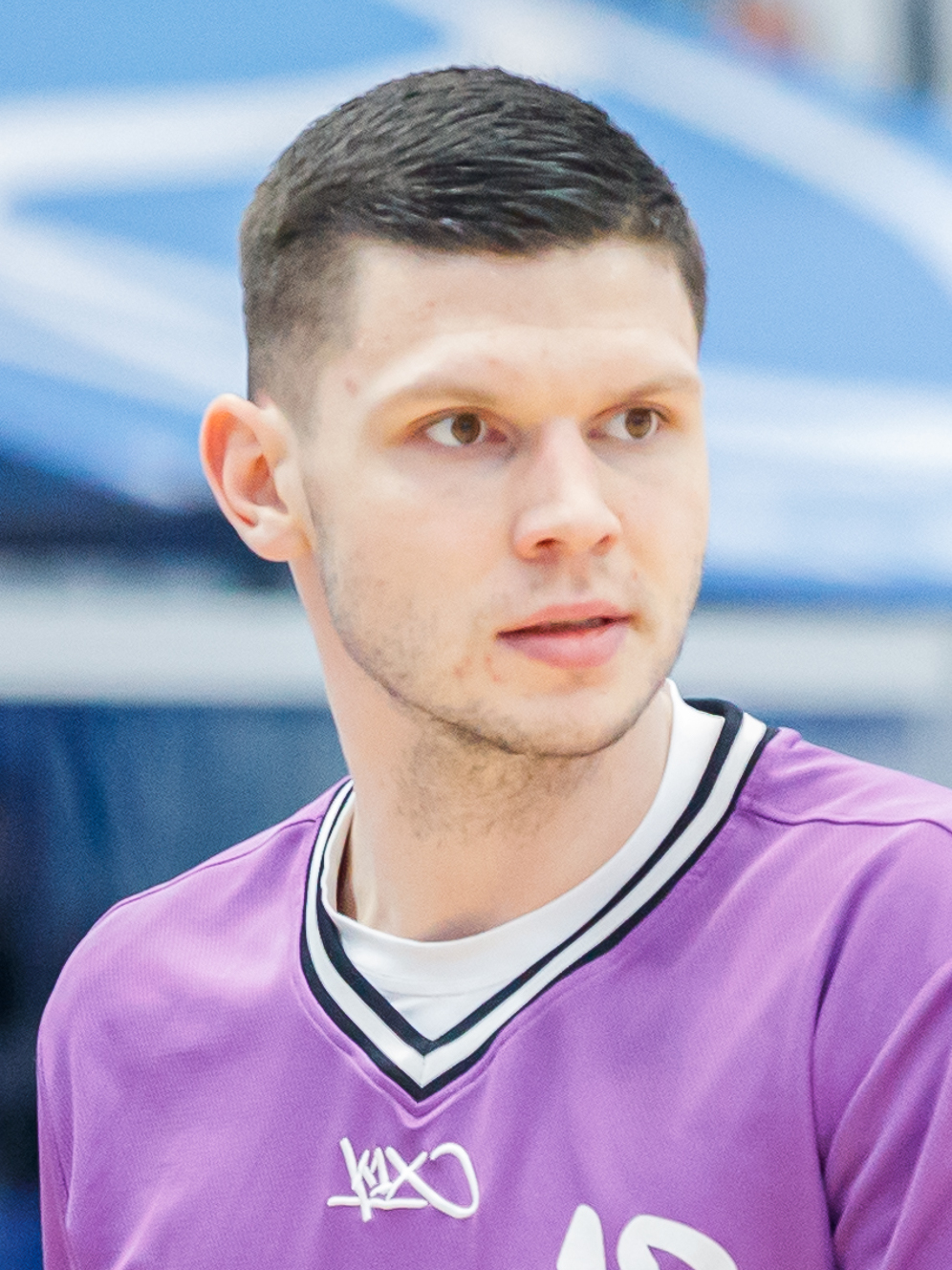
Lomažs in 2021

Rihards Lomažs (born 13 April 1996) is a Latvian professional basketball player for Cedevita Olimpija of the Slovenian League, the ABA League, and the EuroCup.

== Professional career ==
Lomažs started his career in Latvia, playing for Jelgava, Jūrmala and Ventspils. With the latter, he won the Latvian–Estonian Basketball League in 2019, being elected MVP of the Finals. In the summer, he joined the French team ASVEL Basket, playing also in the EuroLeague for two seasons.

After a few months with BG Göttingen in Basketball Bundesliga, in 2021 he joined the Turkish team Merkezefendi. He started the 2022–23 season with Basket Zaragoza, but joined the German club EWE Baskets Oldenburg in November 2022.

In 2023 Lomažs returned to Merkezefendi, but on 29 December 2023, he signed with the Italian powerhouse, Virtus Bologna, where he played also in the EuroLeague.

On October 18, 2024, he signed with Yukatel Merkezefendi of the Basketbol Süper Ligi (BSL) for the third stint.

On January 13, 2025, he signed with Telekom Baskets Bonn of the Basketball Bundesliga (BBL).

On August 6, 2025, Lomažs signed a one-year contract with Klaipėdos Neptūnas of the Lithuanian Basketball League (LKL) and the EuroCup.

== Career statistics ==
Legend
GP	Games played	GS	Games started	MPG	Minutes per game
FG%	Field-goal percentage	3P%	3-point field-goal percentage	FT%	Free-throw percentage
RPG	Rebounds per game	APG	Assists per game	SPG	Steals per game
BPG	Blocks per game	PPG	Points per game	PIR	Performance index rating
**Bold**	Career high

=== EuroLeague ===
Year	Team	GP	GS	MPG	FG%	3P%	FT%	RPG	APG	SPG	BPG	PPG	PIR
2019–20	ASVEL	**27**	**6**	**13.2**	.398	.386	**.848**	**.8**	**.8**	**.3**	—	**4.9**	**3.2**
2020–21	ASVEL	6	1	9.2	.462	.429	.714	.3	.5	—	—	3.3	2.0
2023–24	Bologna	8	0	7.8	**.529**	**.500**	.800	.5	.3	—	—	3.3	2.4
Career		41	7	11.6	.421	.403	.822	.7	.7	.2	—	4.3	2.9

=== EuroCup ===
Year	Team	GP	GS	MPG	FG%	3P%	FT%	RPG	APG	SPG	BPG	PPG	PIR
2025–26	Neptūnas Klaipėda	**16**	**15**	**30.1**	**.449**	**.388**	**.860**	**3.1**	**4.1**	**1.3**	**.1**	**18.6**	**17.9**
Career		16	15	30.1	.449	.388	.860	3.1	4.1	1.3	.1	18.6	17.9
