= Artūras Gudaitis =

Lithuanian basketball player (born 1993)

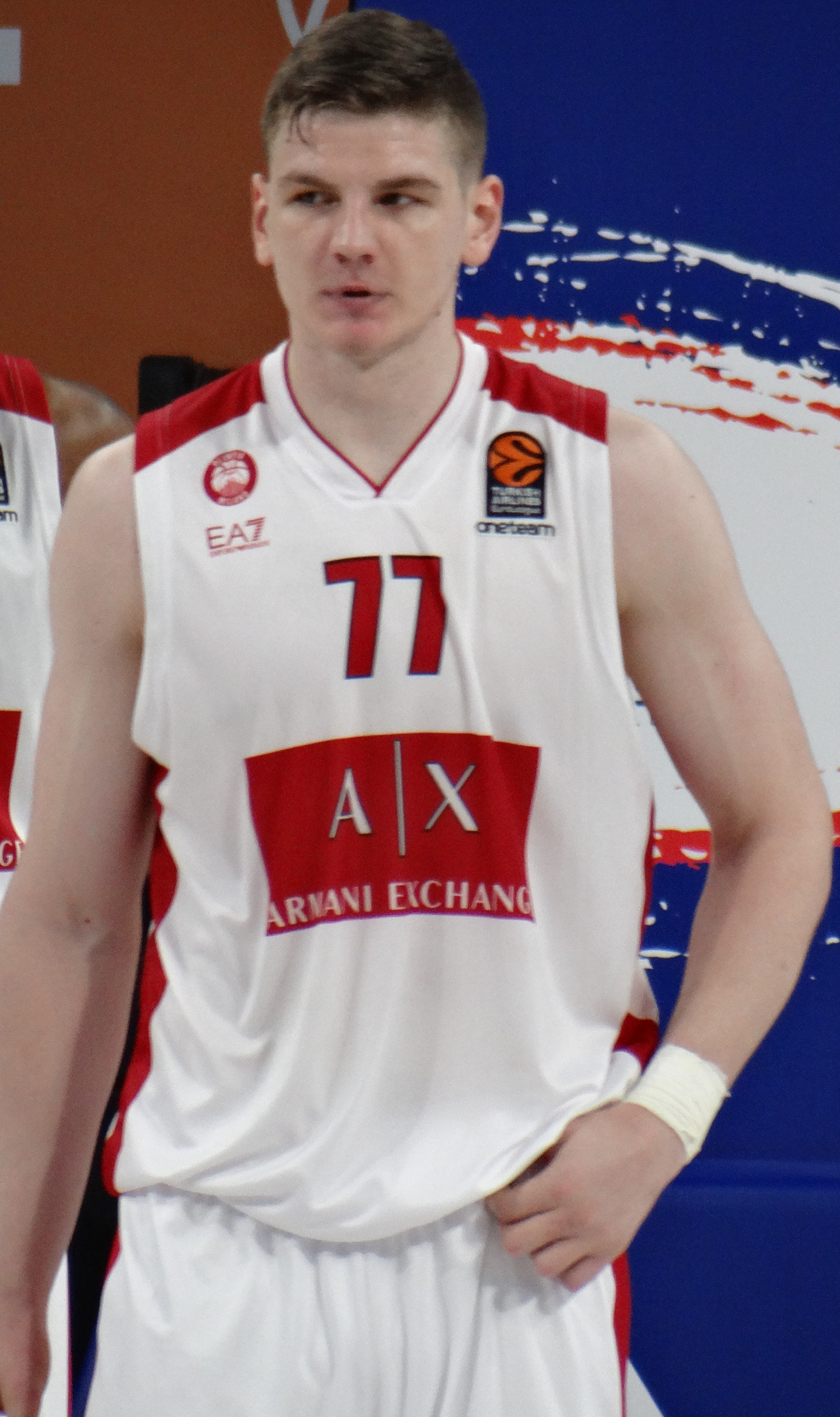
- Gudaitis with Olimpia Milano in 2017

No. 8 – Rytas Vilnius
- Position: Center
- League: LKL; BCL

Personal information
- Born: 19 June 1993 (age 33) Klaipėda, Lithuania
- Listed height: 208 cm (6 ft 10 in)
- Listed weight: 115 kg (254 lb)

Career information
- NBA draft: 2015: 2nd round, 47th overall pick
- Drafted by: Philadelphia 76ers
- Playing career: 2010–present

Career history
- 2010–2011: LCC Klaipėda
- 2011–2012: Gargždai-Bremena
- 2012: Nafta-Universitetas Klaipėda
- 2012–2015: Žalgiris Kaunas
- 2012–2013: →Žalgiris-2 Kaunas
- 2015–2017: Lietuvos rytas Vilnius
- 2017–2020: Olimpia Milano
- 2020–2022: Zenit Saint Petersburg
- 2022: Napoli
- 2022–2023: Panathinaikos
- 2023–2025: Alvark Tokyo
- 2025–present: Rytas Vilnius

Career highlights
- FIBA Champions League champion (2026); All-FIBA Champions League Second Team (2026); LBA champion (2018); 2× Italian Supercup winner (2017, 2018); 2× All-LKL Team (2017, 2026); King Mindaugas Cup champion (2016); 2× LKL champion (2014, 2015); LKF Cup winner (2015); LKL rebounding leader (2026)
- Stats at Basketball Reference

Artūras Gudaitis (born 19 June 1993) is a Lithuanian professional basketball player and the team captain for Rytas Vilnius of the Lithuanian Basketball League (LKL) and the Basketball Champions League (BCL). Standing at 2.08 m (6 ft 10 in), he plays at the center position. He was selected by the Philadelphia 76ers with the 47th overall pick in the 2015 NBA draft.

== Early career ==
Before starting his professional career, Gudaitis played in the RKL with the LCC Klaipėda for one season. The next two seasons he played in NKL, and on his last season with Žalgiris-2 Kaunas he won a bronze medal. Gudaitis was respectively nominated as a most promising young player of the league on the same year.

== Professional career ==
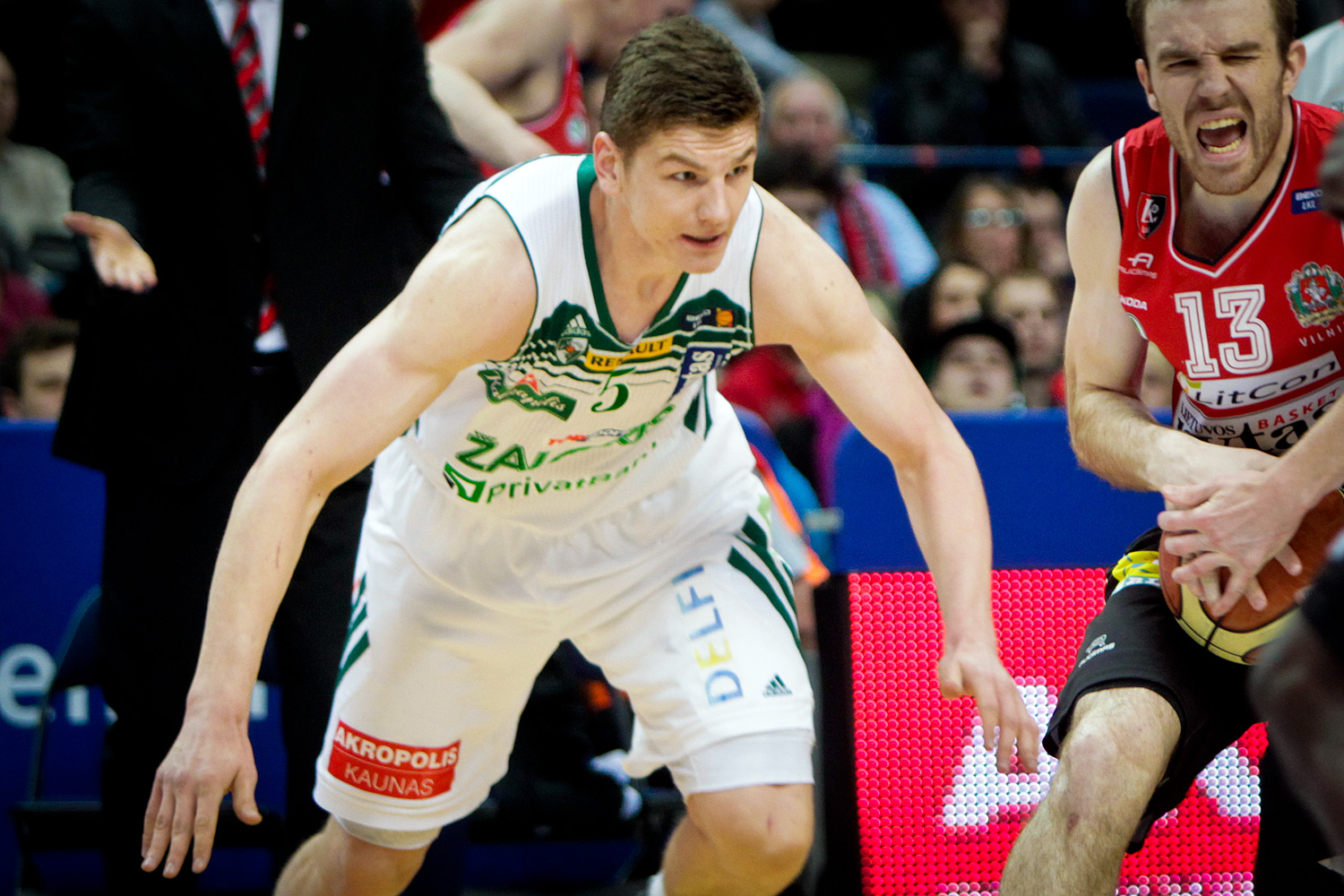
Gudaitis with BC Žalgiris in 2014

On 6 August 2013, Gudaitis signed a professional contract with Žalgiris Kaunas for two years and was brought into the main Žalgiris roster. Whilst suffering from the knee injury in the first half of the season he had his breakthrough game against Lokomotiv Kuban Krasnodar in the EuroLeague tournament, scoring 14 points with 6 rebounds. Gudaitis vastly improved during the regular season, and was called an x-factor of victorious LKL semi-final series against Lietuvos rytas Vilnius.

During 2014–15 LKL season his powerful dunk over Artūras Jomantas was selected as the Top Play of the Regular Season.

On 2 July 2015, he signed a 2+1 contract with Lietuvos rytas Vilnius.

On 9 November 2016, Gudaitis scored a career-high 17 points and got 11 rebounds in a 101–84 win over Montakit Fuenlabrada in EuroCup Basketball game. One week later, on 16 November 2016, Gudaitis scored 12 points and got a career-high 15 rebounds. After an individually successful 2016–17 season, he was named to the LKL All-Tournament Team on 13 June 2017.

On 12 September 2017, Gudaitis signed with Olimpia Milano. On 25 February 2018, Gudaitis extended his contract that would keep him with the team until the end of the 2020–21 season.

On 1 February 2019, during an away game against Herbalife Gran Canaria, Gudaitis suffered an ACL injury that left him sidelined for the remainder of the 2018–2019 season. Despite having played only 21 games in the Euroleague during the season, he was one of its most efficient players, and was considered one of the league's top centers prior to the injury.

On 10 July 2020 Gudaitis moved to Russian club Zenit of the VTB United League and the EuroLeague on a two-year deal. He left the team after the 2022 Russian invasion of Ukraine and spent the latter half of the 2021–2022 season with the Italian club Napoli Basket.

On 20 July 2022, Gudaitis signed a one-year deal with Greek powerhouse Panathinaikos, returning once more to the EuroLeague. In 29 EuroLeague games, he averaged 7.5 points and 3.7 rebounds, playing around 17 minutes per contest. Additionally, in 33 domestic league matches, he averaged 7.9 points and 4.8 rebounds, playing around 16 minutes per contest. On 3 July 2023, Gudaitis was officially released from the Greek powerhouse.

On 21 July 2023, Gudaitis signed a one-year deal with Alvark Tokyo of the Japanese B.League. On July 30, 2024, he re-signed with Alvark Tokyo. On 21 February 2025, Gudaitis terminated his contract by mutual consent.

=== NBA ===
On 26 February 2015 Gudaitis announced that he was going to participate in the 2015 NBA draft and prior to the NBA draft, it was reported that 11 teams were interested in his services.

On 25 June 2015, Gudaitis was selected in the second round, with the 47th pick by the Philadelphia 76ers.

On 10 July 2015, the Sacramento Kings acquired Gudaitis and Luka Mitrović from the Philadelphia 76ers in exchange for Carl Landry, Jason Thompson, and Nik Stauskas. It was reported that Vlade Divac himself requested to acquire Gudaitis.

On 5 July 2016, it was announced that Gudaitis would represent the Kings during the 2016 NBA Summer League.

On 8 February 2018, the Cleveland Cavaliers acquired rights to Gudaitis after they completed a three-team trade with the Sacramento Kings and Utah Jazz.

== National team career ==
Gudaitis represented Lithuania at the U–18 youth tournament in Poland, 2011. His team took 5th place in the tournament, where Gudaitis scored 11.3 points, grabbed 6.2 rebounds and had 1.4 blocks per game.

In 2015 Gudaitis was included in the Lithuania men's national basketball team head coach Jonas Kazlauskas extended candidates list and was invited to the training camp. He was released from the team on 1 September, just 4 days before the championship start. He represented the primary Lithuania national team during the EuroBasket 2017 for the first time and averaged 4.8 points, 2.5 rebounds and 0.2 assists.

== Career statistics ==
Legend
GP	Games played	GS	Games started	MPG	Minutes per game
FG%	Field-goal percentage	3P%	3-point field-goal percentage	FT%	Free-throw percentage
RPG	Rebounds per game	APG	Assists per game	SPG	Steals per game
BPG	Blocks per game	PPG	Points per game	PIR	Performance index rating
**Bold**	Career high

=== EuroLeague ===
Year	Team	GP	GS	MPG	FG%	3P%	FT%	RPG	APG	SPG	BPG	PPG	PIR
2013–14	Žalgiris	7	1	10.3	.600	.000	.636	2.6	.6	.4	.7	4.4	6.9
2014–15	Žalgiris	20	4	15.4	.506	.400	.618	4.0	.3	.2	.9	6.5	7.2
2017–18	Olimpia	29	1	20.4	.618	—	.715	6.3	.2	.6	**1.1**	10.3	15.4
2018–19	Olimpia	21	4	**23.4**	.639	—	**.805**	**7.1**	.4	.8	1.0	**12.5**	**18.7**
2019–20	Olimpia	19	1	16.5	.500	**1.000**	.753	4.4	.5	.4	.9	7.3	10.4
2020–21	Zenit	**31**	**24**	20.0	.601	.323	.381	3.5	**.8**	**1.0**	.6	8.8	7.8
2021–22	Zenit	17	16	19.0	.610	—	.500	4.1	**.8**	.2	.7	6.7	8.6
2022–23	Panathinaikos	29	12	17.3	**.640**	—	.524	3.7	.5	.5	.4	7.5	8.9
Career		173	63	18.4	.607	.300	.696	4.7	.7	.5	.6	8.6	11.7
