= Arnas Velička =

Lithuanian basketball player (born 1999)

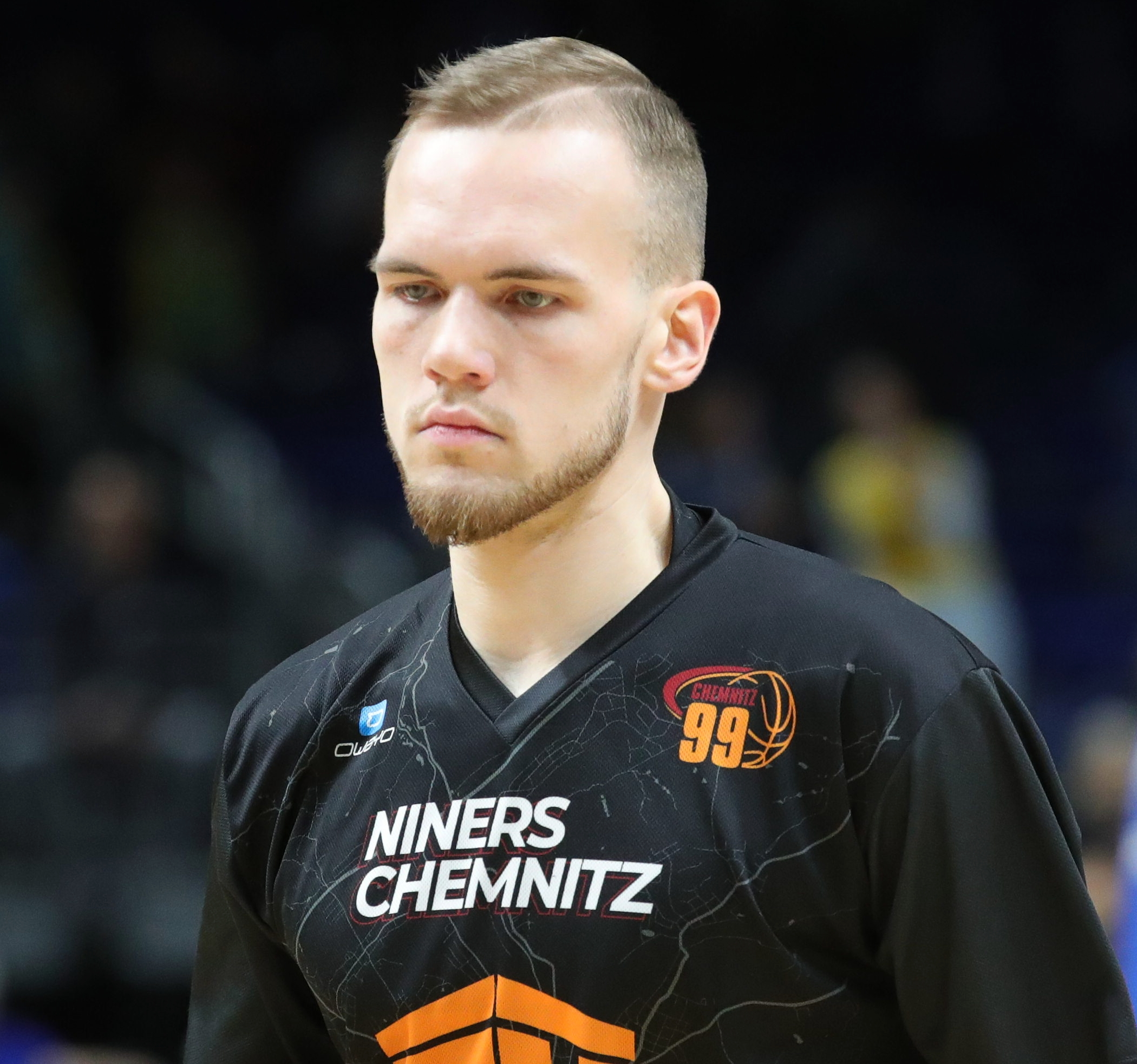
- Velička in 2023

No. 1 – Brisbane Bullets
- Position: Point guard
- League: NBL

Personal information
- Born: 10 December 1999 (age 26) Kaunas, Lithuania
- Listed height: 195 cm (6 ft 5 in)
- Listed weight: 92 kg (203 lb)

Career information
- NBA draft: 2021: undrafted
- Playing career: 2015–present

Career history
- 2015–2016: Žalgiris Kaunas
- 2015-2016: →Žalgiris-2 Kaunas
- 2016–2018: FC Barcelona
- 2016–2018: →FC Barcelona B
- 2017–2018: →Lietkabelis Panevėžys
- 2018–2020: Žalgiris Kaunas
- 2018–2019: →University of Tartu
- 2019–2020: →CBet Prienai
- 2020–2021: Champagne Châlons-Reims
- 2021: Löwen Braunschweig
- 2021–2022: Napoli Basket
- 2022–2023: Niners Chemnitz
- 2023–2024: Rytas Vilnius
- 2024–2025: Löwen Braunschweig
- 2025–2026: Neptūnas Klaipėda
- 2026–present: Brisbane Bullets

Career highlights
- EuroCup assists leader (2026); FIBA Europe Cup assists leader (2023); LKL champion (2024); LKL MVP (2026); 2× All-LKL Team (2020, 2026); LKL assists leader (2026); Basketball Without Borders Europe MVP (2016)
Medals
Men's basketball
Representing Lithuania
FIBA Under-17 World Cup
Bronze medal – third place	2016 Spain	U17 National Team
FIBA Europe Under-18 Championship
Silver medal – second place	2016 Turkey	U18 National Team
Bronze medal – third place	2017 Slovakia	U18 National Team
FIBA Europe Under-16 Championship
Silver medal – second place	2015 Lithuania	U16 National Team

Arnas Velička (born 10 December 1999) is a Lithuanian professional basketball player for the Brisbane Bullets of the Australian National Basketball League (NBL). In the Lithuanian Basketball League (LKL), Velička won a championship in 2024 and was league MVP in 2026.

== Professional career ==
In 2015, after solid performance in FIBA Europe Under-16 Championship he signed with Žalgiris-2 Kaunas. In his first season with the team, Velička reached the NKL finals where they lost to Sūduva Marijampolė and won silver medals. Velička averaged 4.7 points and 1.7 assists in 14.3 minutes per game.

In January 2016, Velička played for Žalgiris Kaunas youth in Adidas Next Generation Tournament which was held in Kaunas. Velička and Isaiah Hartenstein helped the team to win and qualify for the final stage of the tournament where his team finished third in Group A and didn't qualify for the final game. He was selected to an All-Tournament Team, averaging 14.7 points, 8.0 assists and 4.4 rebounds in 30 minutes in 7 games of both tournaments.

On 3 July 2016, Velička signed with FC Barcelona B of the LEB Oro. From 7 to 10 September he participated in the Basketball Without Borders camp in Lohja, Finland and was named as the Overall Camp Most Valuable Player. On 3 February 2017, Velička was loaned to Lietkabelis Panevėžys of the Lithuanian Basketball League until the end of the 2017–18 season. After the 2017–18 season, Velička returned to Žalgiris Kaunas and was loaned to University of Tartu of the Estonian Basketball League for the 2018–19 season.

On 23 June 2020, Velička signed with Champagne Châlons-Reims of the LNB Pro A. He left the club after reaching a mutual agreement to terminate the contract on 8 February 2021, and then signed with Löwen Braunschweig of the Basketball Bundesliga (BBL) for the remainder of the 2020–21 season.

After going undrafted in the 2021 NBA draft, Velička joined the Boston Celtics for the 2021 NBA Summer League. On August 20, 2021, he signed in Italy with Napoli Basket, just promoted to the Serie A.

On 11 August 2022, he signed with Niners Chemnitz of the Basketball Bundesliga (BBL).

On 26 July 2023, he came back to Lithuania and signed with Lithuanian Basketball League runners-up Rytas Vilnius. Despite winning the Lithuanian Basketball League with Rytas Vilnius, the remaining season of the 1+1 contract was mutually terminated in July 2024.

On 1 August 2024, he signed with Löwen Braunschweig of the Basketball Bundesliga.

On 14 July 2025, Velička signed one-year contract with Neptūnas Klaipėda of the Lithuanian Basketball League (LKL) and the EuroCup. During the 2025–26 LKL regular season, he averaged 14.4 points, 7.0 assists, 4.0 rebounds, and 1.5 steals in 27.5 minutes per game. He shot 50 percent from two-point range, 41 percent from three, and 65 percent from the free-throw line, subsequently earning the LKL Most Valuable Player Award.

On 22 June 2026, Velička signed with the Brisbane Bullets of the Australian National Basketball League (NBL) for the 2026–27 season. During his first game in the NBL he scored 23 points and broke the NBL record for most assists by a debutant with 14 versus the New Zealand Breakers, and led the Bullets to a 88–85 victory. On 10 October 2026, he was ruled out for eight weeks with a quad injury. He returned to action on 22 November.

== National team career ==
Velička playing for the Lithuania men's national basketball team in 2021

Velička debuted for the junior national team of Lithuania in the 2015 FIBA Europe Under-16 Championship. He averaged 10.8 points, 4.4 assists per 22.7 minutes of action. His team won silver medals. He was selected to the All-Tournament Team. After leading his Lithuanian Under-17 team to bronze medals in 2016 FIBA Under-17 World Championship, he was named to the All-Tournament Team, averaging 12.1 points, 4.1 rebounds and a tournament high 4.7 assists per game. Same year Velička was also invited to compete in the 2016 FIBA Europe Under-18 Championship. He not only was one of the silver medals winning national team leaders with 11 points, 3 rebounds and 5.7 assists, but also was the tournament leader in assists. His game-winning three-point shot at the buzzer in the quarter-final against the Russian U18 National Team was named as the top play of the tournament. Velička also played for Lithuania in the 2019 FIBA U20 European Championship and averaged 16.4 points, 4.9 rebounds, 6.6 assists per game, however this time Lithuania was eliminated in the quarterfinal.

Velička debuted in the Lithuania men's national basketball team during the EuroBasket 2022 qualification and in three games averaged 4 points, 1.3 rebounds, 2.3 assists. Later he also represented Lithuania during the 2023 FIBA Basketball World Cup qualification and EuroBasket 2025 qualification. In 2025, Velička was for the first time included into the final roster of the Lithuania men's national basketball team during a major tournament – EuroBasket 2025.

== Career statistics ==
Legend
GP	Games played	GS	Games started	MPG	Minutes per game
FG%	Field-goal percentage	3P%	3-point field-goal percentage	FT%	Free-throw percentage
RPG	Rebounds per game	APG	Assists per game	SPG	Steals per game
BPG	Blocks per game	PPG	Points per game	PIR	Performance index rating
**Bold**	Career high

=== EuroCup ===
Year	Team	GP	GS	MPG	FG%	3P%	FT%	RPG	APG	SPG	BPG	PPG	PIR
2025–26	Neptūnas	17	17	30.5	.397	.294	.691	4.3	7.7	1.6	.1	14.1	19.8
Career		17	17	30.5	.397	.294	.691	4.3	7.7	1.6	.1	14.1	19.8
