= Giedrius Žibėnas =

Lithuanian basketball coach

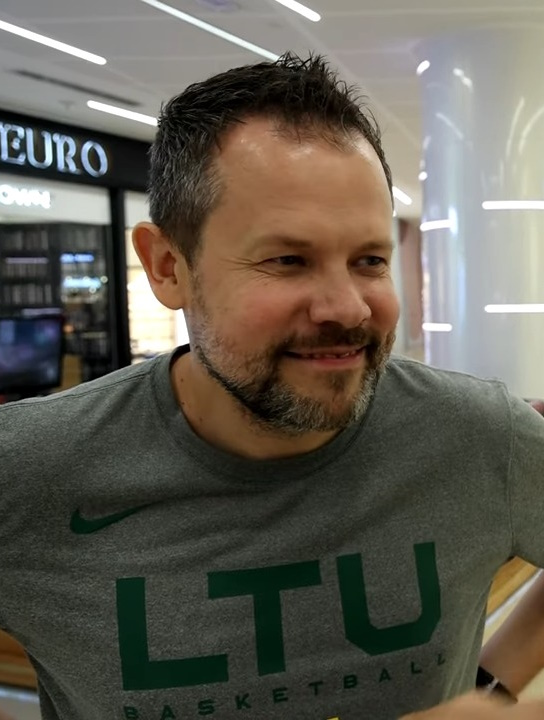
- Žibėnas in 2023

Free agent
- Position: Head coach

Personal information
- Born: 6 April 1984 (age 42) Kaunas, Lithuania
- Coaching career: 2012–present

Career history

Coaching
- 2012–2014: Zanavykas Šakiai
- 2014–2015: Sūduva-Mantinga
- 2015–2016: Czarni Słupsk (assistant)
- 2016: Palayesh Naft Abadan BC
- 2017: Copenhagen Wolfpack
- 2017–2018: BC Kalev (assistant)
- 2018–2019: Stapac Jakarta
- 2019–2020: Prawira Bandung
- 2020–2021: Rytas Vilnius (assistant)
- 2021–2024: Lithuania (assistant)
- 2021–2026: Rytas Vilnius

Career highlights
- As head coach: FIBA Champions League champion (2026); 2× Lithuanian League champion (2022, 2024); Lithuanian League Coach of the Year (2022); IBL champion (2019); As assistant coach: Estonian League champion (2018)

Giedrius Žibėnas (born 6 April 1984) is a Lithuanian professional basketball coach. He is currently a free agent. His most recent job was with Rytas Vilnius of the Lithuanian Basketball League (LKL) where he was the head coach for 5 years. (2021-2026)

== Coaching career ==
Žibėnas started his coaching career in 2012 with Zanavykas Šakiai of the NKL, the second division of Lithuania. He later worked as an assistant coach with the Polish club Czarni Słupsk.

On 8 August 2018, Žibėnas was named the head coach of Stapac Jakarta of the Indonesian Basketball League (IBL). He led the club to its fifth IBL championship in the 2018–19 season.

In June 2020, Žibėnas returned to Lithuania and signed with Rytas Vilnius as an assistant coach under Donaldas Kairys. In January 2021, he replaced Kairys as head coach of Rytas. Later that season, he signed a new one-year contract with the club. On 13 June 2022, Žibėnas received the LKL Coach of the Year award after leading Rytas to their sixth Lithuanian championship. In the 2023–24 season, he guided the team to another LKL title by defeating rivals Žalgiris Kaunas 3–1 in the final series.

In 2026, Žibėnas won the Basketball Champions League, which was seen as the true underdog story. This did not last for long, as in the Lietuvos krepšinio lyga quarterfinals, BC Rytas lost to the 7th seeded BC Juventus 0-2 - missing the LKL semifinals became the biggest fiasco in Rytas history. Žibėnas was fired days later after on May 25, 2026.

== National team coaching career ==
In October 2021, Žibėnas joined the Lithuania national team as an assistant coach under Kazys Maksvytis. He was a staff member at EuroBasket 2022 and 2023 FIBA World Cup.
