= Cedric Henderson Jr. =

American basketball player (born 2000)

No. 2 – Šiauliai
- Position: Small forward / shooting guard
- League: LKL; EuroCup

Personal information
- Born: March 3, 2000 (age 26) Memphis, Tennessee, U.S.
- Listed height: 6 ft 6 in (1.98 m)
- Listed weight: 200 lb (91 kg)

Career information
- High school: Briarcrest Christian (Eads, Tennessee)
- College: Southwest Tennessee CC (2018–2019); Campbell (2019–2022); Arizona (2022–2023)
- NBA draft: 2023: undrafted
- Playing career: 2023–present

Career history
- 2023–2024: CSM Constanța
- 2024–2025: PAOK Thessaloniki
- 2025–present: Šiauliai

Career highlights
- All-LKL Team (2026); LKL Top Scorer (2026); Second-team All-Big South (2021)

Cedric Henderson Jr. (born March 3, 2000) is an American professional basketball player for Šiauliai of the Lithuanian Basketball League (LKL) and the EuroCup. He played college basketball for Southwest Tennessee Community College, Campbell Fighting Camels and the Arizona Wildcats.

== High school career ==
Henderson attended Briarcrest Christian School at Eads, Tennessee.

== College career ==
Henderson attended Southwest Tennessee Community College after finishing high school. During his period at Southwest Tennessee, he was coached from his father Cedric Henderson. The next three years, he played college basketball with Campbell. During his second season with the Camels, he averaged 15 points and 4.4 rebounds per game and was named to the Big South All-Second Team. After three years with Campbell, he was transferred to Arizona for his final college year.

== Professional career ==
=== CSM Constanța (2023–2024) ===
After going undrafted in the 2024 NBA draft, Henderson signed a contract with CSM Constanța of the Romanian Liga Națională. In his first professional season, he averaged 15.7 points, 3.5 rebounds and 2.3 assists per game, shooting 45.2 percent from three.

=== PAOK Thessaloniki (2024–2025) ===
On July 11, 2024, Henderson signed with PAOK Thessaloniki of the Greek Basketball League.

=== Šiauliai (2025–present) ===
On July 26, 2025, Henderson signed with Šiauliai of the Lithuanian Basketball League (LKL). On April 12, 2026, Henderson recorded a career-high 40 points on 14-of-21 shooting from the field, leading Šiauliai to a 107–90 home victory over Rytas Vilnius. He led the LKL in scoring, finishing the regular season with averages of 18.1 points, 4.2 rebounds and 2.1 assists per game. On July 7, 2026, Henderson extended his contract through the 2026–27 season.

== Personal life ==
Henderson's father, Cedric Henderson, was also a professional basketball player who played for 4 years in the NBA from 1997 to 2001 with the Cleveland Cavaliers and the Golden State Warriors.
