= 2020–21 BC Žalgiris season =

77th season in the existence of the Lithuanian basketball team

Žalgiris Kaunas
2020–21 season
- Director: (Lithuania) Paulius Motiejūnas
- Sports director: (Lithuania) Robertas Javtokas
- Head coach: (Austria) Martin Schiller
- Arena: Žalgiris Arena
- LKL: Champions
- EuroLeague: Regular Season
- Lithuanian Cup: Champions
- Highest home attendance: 5,131; 82–94 (Spain) Valencia (22 October 2020)
- Lowest home attendance: 239; 90-93 (Spain) Real Madrid (6 November 2020)
- Biggest win: +47; 92–45 (Lithuania) Rytas (6 December 2020)
- Biggest defeat: -28; 57–85 (Israel) Maccabi Tel Aviv (12 November 2020)
Home	Away
- All statistics correct as of July 13, 2020.

The 2020–21 BC Žalgiris season is the 77th season in the existence of the club. The club has been playing in the Betsafe-LKL, King Mindaugas Cup and the EuroLeague.

== Overview ==
During the off-season, Šarūnas Jasikevičius left Žalgiris after four and a half seasons as a head coach of the team, signing for FC Barcelona. Subsequently, assistant coaches Darius Maskoliūnas and Tomas Masiulis, together with athletic coach Justinas Grainys, followed him to Barcelona. Players K. C. Rivers, Edgaras Ulanovas, and Zach LeDay signed with other EuroLeague teams. An 18-year-old Marek Blaževič was bought out from Žalgiris local rivals Rytas, signing for three years, although their Estonian prospect Kerr Kriisa decided to pursue his career in the USA college basketball. Lithuanian trio, Laurynas Birutis, Arnas Velička, and Gytis Masiulis left the club after playing mainly out on loan, with their contracts not being renewed. New arrivals included big man duo Augustine Rubit and Joffrey Lauvergne, both signed for one-year contract, guard Steve Vasturia signed for a two-year contract (with a possible extension for another year), and swingman Patricio Garino. Žalgiris youth product Tomas Dimša returned to the team after five years, signing a two-year contract (with a possible extension for another year), but was loaned out shortly afterward.

== Players ==
Note: Flags indicate national team eligibility at FIBA-sanctioned events. Players may hold other non-FIBA nationalities not displayed.

Žalgiris roster
Players
Coaches

Pos.	No.	Nat.	Name	Ht.	Wt.	Age
PG	0	(United States)	Walkup, Thomas	1.93 m (6 ft 4 in)	92 kg (203 lb)	33 – 30 December 1992
C	1	(Lithuania)	Blaževič, Marek	2.09 m (6 ft 10 in)	114 kg (251 lb)	24 – 1 September 2001
PG	4	(Lithuania)	Lekavičius, Lukas	1.81 m (5 ft 11 in)	76 kg (168 lb)	32 – 30 March 1994
SF	21	(Lithuania)	Milaknis, Arturas	1.95 m (6 ft 5 in)	90 kg (198 lb)	40 – 6 June 1986
PF	8	(Lithuania)	Murauskas, Paulius	2.03 m (6 ft 8 in)	100 kg (220 lb)	22 – 14 February 2004
PF	10	(United States)	Hayes, Nigel	2.03 m (6 ft 8 in)	103 kg (227 lb)	31 – 16 December 1994
PF	13	(Lithuania)	Jankūnas, Paulius (C)	2.05 m (6 ft 9 in)	113 kg (249 lb)	42 – 29 April 1984
SG	16	(Lithuania)	Lukošiūnas, Karolis	1.95 m (6 ft 5 in)	92 kg (203 lb)	29 – 4 August 1997
PG	17	(Lithuania)	Rubštavičius, Mantas	1.98 m (6 ft 6 in)	84 kg (185 lb)	24 – 17 May 2002
SF	7	(Argentina)	Garino, Patricio	2.01 m (6 ft 7 in)	92 kg (203 lb)	33 – 16 May 1993
C	23	(Lithuania)	Geben, Martinas	2.08 m (6 ft 10 in)	114 kg (251 lb)	31 – 20 October 1994
F/C	24	(United States)	Rubit, Augustine	2.03 m (6 ft 8 in)	107 kg (236 lb)	37 – 14 August 1989
G	31	(Lithuania)	Jokubaitis, Rokas	1.93 m (6 ft 4 in)	88 kg (194 lb)	25 – 19 November 2000
G/F	32	(United States)	Vasturia, Steve	1.96 m (6 ft 5 in)	92 kg (203 lb)	31 – 10 February 1995
G/F	40	(Lithuania)	Grigonis, Marius	1.98 m (6 ft 6 in)	93 kg (205 lb)	32 – 26 April 1994
C	77	(France)	Lauvergne, Joffrey	2.11 m (6 ft 11 in)	118 kg (260 lb)	34 – 30 September 1991

Head coach

- (Austria) Martin Schiller

Assistant coach(es)

- (Germany) Arne Woltmann
- (Lithuania) Evaldas Beržininkaitis
- (Lithuania) Tautvydas Sabonis

Athletic trainer(s)

- (Lithuania) Sigitas Kavaliauskas
- (Lithuania) Nerijus Navickas

Doctor

- (Lithuania) Vytautas Kailius

Physiotherapist(s)

- (Lithuania) Paulius Jacikas

Legend

- (C) Team captain
- Injured

- Roster
Updated: January 31, 2021

=== Depth chart ===
Pos.	Starting 5	Bench 1	Bench 2	Bench 3
C	Joffrey Lauvergne	Martinas Geben		Marek Blaževič
PF	Nigel Hayes	Augustine Rubit	Paulius Jankūnas	Paulius Murauskas
SF	Marius Grigonis	Steve Vasturia		Patricio Garino (injured)
SG	Thomas Walkup	Artūras Milaknis	Karolis Lukošiūnas
PG	Lukas Lekavičius	Rokas Jokubaitis		Mantas Rubštavičius

=== Transactions ===
==== Players in ====
No.	Pos.	Nat.	Name	Moving from		Type	Date	Source
32	G/F	(United States)	Steve Vasturia	Rasta Vechta	(Germany)	End of contract	June 2020	
33	SG	(Lithuania)	Tomas Dimša	Lietkabelis Panevėžys	(Lithuania)	End of contract	June 2020	
1	C	(Lithuania)	Marek Blaževič	Rytas Vilnius	(Lithuania)	Buyout	June 2020	
77	F/C	(France)	Joffrey Lauvergne	Fenerbahçe Basketball	(Turkey)	End of contract	July 2020	
24	F/C	(United States)	Augustine Rubit	Olympiacos Piraeus	(Greece)	Parted ways	July 2020	
7	SF	(Argentina)	Patricio Garino	Baskonia Vitoria-Gasteiz	(Spain)	End of contract	July 2020	
8	SF	(Lithuania)	Paulius Murauskas	Žalgiris-2	(Lithuania)	Two way contract	December 2020	
17	SG	(Lithuania)	Mantas Rubštavičius	Žalgiris-2	(Lithuania)	Two way contract	December 2020	

==== Players out ====
No.	Pos.	Nat.	Name	Moving to		Type	Date	Source
77	PG	(Estonia)	Kerr Kriisa	Arizona Wildcats	(United States)	Parted ways^{1}	April 2020	
11	C	(Lithuania)	Laurynas Birutis	Monbus Obradoiro	(Spain)	End of contract^{1}	June 2020	
1	PG	(Lithuania)	Arnas Velička	Champagne Châlons-Reims	(France)	End of contract^{1}	June 2020	
1	G/F	(United States)	K. C. Rivers	Zenit Saint Petersburg	(Russia)	End of contract	July 2020	
92	SF	(Lithuania)	Edgaras Ulanovas	Fenerbahçe Istanbul	(Turkey)	End of contract	July 2020	
20	PF	(Lithuania)	Gytis Masiulis	Lietkabelis Panevėžys	(Lithuania)	End of contract^{1}	July 2020	
32	F/C	(United States)	Zach LeDay	AX Armani Exchange Milan	(Italy)	Buyout	July 2020	
34	F/C	(Australia)	Jock Landale	Melbourne United	(Australia)	Parted ways	July 2020	

Notes:

- ^{1} On loan during the 2020–21 season.

==== Players out on loan ====
No.	Pos.	Nat.	Name	Moving to		Type	Date	Source
	F/C	(Lithuania)	Erikas Venskus	Lietkabelis Panevėžys	(Lithuania)	Loan	June 2020	
	SG	(Lithuania)	Tomas Dimša	Herbalife Gran Canaria	(Spain)	Loan	September 2020	
	SF	(France)	Tom Digbeu	CBet Prienai	(Lithuania)	Loan	September 2020	
	G	(Lithuania)	Ignas Sargiūnas	CBet Prienai	(Lithuania)	Loan	January 2021	

== Club ==
=== Technical staff ===
Position	Staff member
Director	(Lithuania) Paulius Motiejūnas
Sports director	(Lithuania) Robertas Javtokas
Head coach	(Austria) Martin Schiller
Assistant Coaches	(Germany) Arne Woltmann
Assistant Coaches	(Lithuania) Evaldas Beržininkaitis
Assistant Coaches	(Lithuania) Tautvydas Sabonis
Athletic Coaches	(Lithuania) Sigitas Kavaliauskas
Athletic Coaches	(Lithuania) Nerijus Navickas
Physiotherapist	(Lithuania) Paulius Jacikas
Physician	(Lithuania) Vytautas Kailius
Team Manager	(Lithuania) Mindaugas Kvedaras

== Pre-season games ==
Win Loss

31 August 2020 1	Žalgiris (Lithuania)	92–59	(Latvia) VEF Rīga	Kaunas
18:30	Scoring by quarter: 24-7, 26-17, 24-18, 18-17
	Pts: Hayes, Grigonis 15; Rebs: Lauvergne 12; Asts: Lauvergne 6 PIR: Lauvergne 21	Boxscore	Pts: Zoriks 16; Rebs: Helmanis, Kyser 5 Asts: Madsen, Zoriks 3 PIR: Zoriks 15	Arena: Žalgirio arena Attendance: not available Referees: not available

4 September 2020 2	Žalgiris (Lithuania)	102–71	(Lithuania) Juventus	Kaunas
18:30	Scoring by quarter: 20-18, 28-10, 33-20, 21-23
	Pts: Grigonis 17; Rebs: Geben 8 Asts: Walkup 7 PIR: Walkup 18	Boxscore	Pts: Jucikas, Crawford 13; Rebs: Jucikas 8 Asts: Crawford 6 PIR: Jucikas 16	Arena: Žalgirio arena Attendance: not available Referees: Gytis Vilius, Jurgis Laurinavičius, Artūras Šukys

7 September 2020 3	Žalgiris (Lithuania)	102–78	(Lithuania) Lietkabelis	Palanga
17:00	Scoring by quarter: 24-24, 35-24, 23-14, 20-16
	Pts: Lauvergne 19; Rebs: Grigonis 5 Asts: Walkup 7 PIR: Grigonis 22	Boxscore	Pts: Marić 16; Rebs: Marić 7 Asts: Masiulis, Vinales 2 PIR: Marić 20	Arena: Palangos arena Attendance: not available Referees: not available

12 September 2020 4	Žalgiris (Lithuania)	81–74	(Greece) Panathinaikos	Kaunas
19:00	Scoring by quarter: 23-17, 20-21, 16-16, 22-20
	Pts: Jokubaitis 16; Rebs: Lauvergne 13; Asts: Walkup 8 PIR: Lauvergne 23	Boxscore	Pts: Nedović 22; Rebs: Bentil 6 Asts: Jackson 5 PIR: Nedović 16	Arena: Žalgirio arena Attendance: 2707; Referees: Robert Lottermoser, Jakub Zamojski, Rain Peerandi

13 September 2020 5	Žalgiris (Lithuania)	70–88	(Italy) AX Armani Exchange	Kaunas
19:00	Scoring by quarter: 13-23, 10-23, 27-17, 20-25
	Pts: Walkup 13; Rebs: Lauvergne 8 Asts: Jokubaitis, Walkup 4 PIR: Lauvergne 17	Boxscore	Pts: Punter 26; Rebs: Hines 7 Asts: Hines 4 PIR: Punter 29	Arena: Žalgirio arena Attendance: 2682; Referees: Robert Lottermoser, Oļegs Latiševs, Rain Peerandi

== Competitions ==
=== Overview ===
Competition	Record							
Competition	Pld	W	D	L	PF	PA	PD	Win %
Betsafe-LKL	44	41	0	3	4,033	3,172	+861	93.18
EuroLeague	34	17	0	17	2,630	2,645	−15	50.00
King Mindaugas Cup	4	4	0	0	361	300	+61	100.00
Total	82	62	0	20	7,024	6,117	+907	75.61

Last updated: April 16, 2021
Source: Competitions

=== Betsafe-LKL ===
==== Regular season ====
Pos	Team	Pld	W	L	PF	PA	PD	Qualification or relegation
1	Žalgiris	36	33	3	3277	2569	+708	Advance to playoffs
2	Rytas	36	27	9	3185	2858	+327	Advance to playoffs
3	Lietkabelis	36	23	13	3052	2883	+169	Advance to playoffs
4	Juventus	36	23	13	3202	3102	+100	Advance to playoffs
5	Cbet Prienai	36	14	22	3020	3210	−190	Advance to playoffs

Source: LKL.LT

==== Results summary ====
Overall						Home					Away				
Pld	W	L	PF	PA	PD	W	L	PF	PA	PD	W	L	PF	PA	PD
30	27	3	2717	2127	+590	13	2	1330	1037	+293	14	1	1387	1090	+297

Source: Competitive matches

==== Results by round ====
Round	1	2	3	4	5	6	7	8	9	10	11	12	13	14	15	16	17	18	19	20	21	22	23	24	25	26	27	28	29	30	31	32	33	34	35	36
Ground	H	A	H	A	H	A	A	H	H	A	A	A	H	A	A	A	H	H	H	H	H	H	A	H	A	H	A	H	A	A	H	A	A	H	H	A
Result	W	W	L	W	W	W	W	W	W	W	W	W	W	L	W	W	W	W	W	W	W	W	W	L	W	W	W	W	W	W	W	W	W	W	W	W
Position	1	1	3	2	2	2	1	1	1	1	1	1	1	1	1	1	1	1	1	1	1	1	1	1	1	1	1	1	1	1	1	1	1	1	1	1

Source: Competitive matches
Ground: A = Away; H = Home; R = Rest. Result: L = Loss; W = Win; R = Rest; P = Postponed.

Win Loss

==== Matches ====
20 September 2020 1	Žalgiris (Lithuania)	89–56	(Lithuania) Šiauliai	Kaunas
17:20	Scoring by quarter: 23–21, 22–11, 24–7, 20–17
	Pts: Lauvergne 16; Rebs: Geben 9 Asts: Walkup 6 PIR: Lauvergne 24	Boxscore	Pts: van Vliet 14; Rebs: Anderson 10; Asts: Urbonas 3 PIR: Anderson 13	Arena: Žalgirio arena Attendance: 1047; Referees: Gytis Vilius, Martynas Gudas, Martynas Karaliūnas

23 September 2020 2	Dzūkija (Lithuania)	62–95	(Lithuania) Žalgiris	Alytus
18:50	Scoring by quarter: 17–25, 11–27, 13–22, 21–21
	Pts: Jomantas 18; Rebs: Jasaitis, Jomantas 6 Asts: Žemaitis 8 PIR: Jomantas 21	Boxscore	Pts: Hayes 14; Rebs: Walkup 7 Asts: Walkup 7 PIR: Grigonis 19	Arena: Alytaus sporto ir rekreacijos centras Attendance: 1100; Referees: Artūras Šukys, Andrius Maleckas, Mantas Butvilas

27 September 2020 3	Žalgiris (Lithuania)	61–72	(Lithuania) Lietkabelis	Kaunas
17:20	Scoring by quarter: 19–13, 17–20, 11–29, 14–10
	Pts: Rubit 11; Rebs: Lauvergne 6 Asts: Walkup 4 PIR: Lauvergne 14	Boxscore	Pts: Vinales 24; Rebs: Maldūnas, Masiulis 6 Asts: Vinales 6 PIR: Vinales 18	Arena: Žalgirio arena Attendance: 1095; Referees: Artūras Šukys, Gvidas Gedvilas, Juozas Barkauskas

4 October 2020 4	Pieno Žvaigždės (Lithuania)	67–81	(Lithuania) Žalgiris	Pasvalys
17:20	Scoring by quarter: 21–20, 11–21, 21–25, 14–15
	Pts: Mirković 26; Rebs: Lekūnas 6 Asts: Lasenbergs, Manigat 4 PIR: Mirković 26	Boxscore	Pts: Lekavičius, Grigonis 16; Rebs: Lauvergne 5 Asts: Grigonis 5 PIR: Grigonis 23	Arena: Pieno žvaigždžių arena Attendance: 600; Referees: Jurgis Laurinavičius, Mindaugas Večerskis, Darius Šomka

18 October 2020 5	Žalgiris (Lithuania)	84–63	(Lithuania) Juventus	Kaunas
17:20	Scoring by quarter: 19–17, 21–14, 24–17, 20–15
	Pts: three players 13; Rebs: Jankūnas 8 Asts: Walkup 4 PIR: Geben 17	Boxscore	Pts: Crawford 18; Rebs: Vaitkus 7 Asts: three players 4 PIR: Crawford 19	Arena: Žalgirio arena Attendance: 1018; Referees: Artūras Šukys, Andrius Maleckas, Gintaras Mačiulis

25 October 2020 6	Rytas (Lithuania)	72–84	(Lithuania) Žalgiris	Vilnius
17:20	Scoring by quarter: 24–16, 18–18, 10–28, 20–22
	Pts: Jackson 18; Rebs: three players 5 Asts: Gustys 3 PIR: Jackson 19	Boxscore	Pts: Grigonis 13; Rebs: Lauvergne 6 Asts: Jokubaitis 6 PIR: Rubit, Lauvergne 15	Arena: Siemens arena Attendance: 4376; Referees: Gytis Vilius, Tomas Jasevičius, Vilius Mačiulaitis

8 November 2020 7	CBet (Lithuania)	72–96	(Lithuania) Žalgiris	Prienai
20:00	Scoring by quarter: 9-28, 22-18, 25-30, 16-20
	Pts: Miniotas 20; Rebs: Miniotas 7 Asts: Wright 7 PIR: Miniotas 23	Boxscore	Pts: Lekavičius 22; Rebs: Jankūnas, Geben 8 Asts: Walkup 5 PIR: Lekavičius 28	Arena: Prienų sporto arena Attendance: 0 Referees: Jurgis Laurinavičius, Gintaras Vitkauskas, Andžej Urbanovič

15 November 2020 8	Žalgiris (Lithuania)	103–100(OT)	(Lithuania) CBet	Kaunas
17:20	Scoring by quarter: 31–24, 20–26, 26-21, 14-20, Overtime: 12-9
	Pts: Vasturia 25; Rebs: Rubit, Lauvergne 7 Asts: Walkup 9 PIR: Vasturia 26	Boxscore	Pts: Digbeu 27; Rebs: Digbeu 11; Asts: Wright 7 PIR: Digbeu 35	Arena: Žalgirio arena Attendance: 0 Referees: Tomas Jasevičius, Andrius Maleckas, Gintaras Mačiulis

22 November 2020 9	Žalgiris (Lithuania)	81–59	(Lithuania) Neptūnas	Kaunas
17:20	Scoring by quarter: 22-20, 14-14, 22-15, 23-10
	Pts: Grigonis 15; Rebs: Jankūnas 5 Asts: Jokubaitis 6 PIR: Grigonis 13	Boxscore	Pts: Griciūnas 10; Rebs: Giga 8 Asts: Sidarevičius 3 PIR: Sidarevičius 11	Arena: Žalgirio arena Attendance: 0 Referees: Tomas Jasevičius, Mindaugas Večerskis, Andžej Urbanovič

6 December 2020 10	Žalgiris (Lithuania)	92–45	(Lithuania) Rytas	Kaunas
17:20	Scoring by quarter: 23-11, 22-11, 27-11, 20-12
	Pts: Lekavičius 16; Rebs: Jankūnas 9 Asts: Jokubaitis 6 PIR: Lekavičius 20	Boxscore	Pts: Echodas 10; Rebs: Echodas 8 Asts: Marčiulionis 4 PIR: Echodas 15	Arena: Žalgirio arena Attendance: 0 Referees: Jurgis Laurinavičius, Artūras Šukys, Gintaras Mačiulis

20 December 2020 11	Lietkabelis (Lithuania)	77–82	(Lithuania) Žalgiris	Panevėžys
17:20	Scoring by quarter: 13-27, 7-13, 27-13, 30-29
	Pts: Vinales 19; Rebs: Maldūnas 9 Asts: Gagić 6 PIR: Vinales 22	Boxscore	Pts: Lauvergne 17; Rebs: Walkup 6 Asts: Grigonis 8 PIR: Lauvergne 25	Arena: Cido arena Attendance: 0 Referees: Tomas Jasevičius, Jurgis Laurinavičius, Andrius Maleckas

3 January 2021 12	Neptūnas (Lithuania)	74–104	(Lithuania) Žalgiris	Klaipėda
19:30	Scoring by quarter: 20-34, 20-25, 14-25, 20-20
	Pts: Mineikis, Giga 11; Rebs: Janavičius, Slavinskas 6 Asts: Pažėra 4 PIR: Slavinskas 15	Boxscore	Pts: Jokubaitis 17; Rebs: Geben, Jankūnas 6 Asts: Walkup 8 PIR: Geben 24	Arena: Švyturio arena Attendance: 0 Referees: Gytis Vilius, Tomas Jasevičius, Oleg Barkovskij

24 January 2021 13	Žalgiris (Lithuania)	94–59	(Lithuania) Nevėžis-Optibet	Kaunas
17:20	Scoring by quarter: 27-10, 17-14, 30-25, 20-10
	Pts: Grigonis, Lukošiūnas 14; Rebs: Geben 15; Asts: Jokubaitis 7 PIR: Geben 28	Boxscore	Pts: Kalaitzakis 15; Rebs: Kazakauskas 7 Asts: three players 3 PIR: Kalaitzakis 19	Arena: Žalgirio arena Attendance: 0 Referees: Artūras Šukys, Andžej Urbanovič, Darius Šomka

31 January 2021 14	Juventus (Lithuania)	90–87	(Lithuania) Žalgiris	Utena
17:20	Scoring by quarter: 22-28, 24-24, 19-24, 25-11
	Pts: Skučas 20; Rebs: Kupšas 5 Asts: Vaitkus 6 PIR: Skučas 27	Boxscore	Pts: Jokubaitis, Lekavičius 13; Rebs: Geben 5 Asts: Lekavičius 6 PIR: Jokubaitis, Lekavičius 17	Arena: Utenos daugiafunkcis sporto centras Attendance: 0 Referees: Tomas Jasevičius, Gytis Vilius, Juozas Barkauskas

2 February 2021 15	Nevėžis-Optibet (Lithuania)	47–78	(Lithuania) Žalgiris	Kėdainiai
18:00	Scoring by quarter: 18-22, 14-23, 8-12, 7-21
	Pts: Barefield 15; Rebs: Kazakauskas, Kalaitzakis 6 Asts: Gintvainis 3 PIR: Barefield 17	Boxscore	Pts: Lukošiūnas 11; Rebs: Geben, Walkup 6 Asts: Walkup 6 PIR: Geben 19	Arena: Kėdainių arena Attendance: 0 Referees: Jurgis Laurinavičius, Martynas Gudas, Martynas Karaliūnas

6 February 2021 16	Nevėžis-Optibet (Lithuania)	53–108	(Lithuania) Žalgiris	Kėdainiai
16:30	Scoring by quarter: 7-26, 16-32, 11-23, 19-27
	Pts: Montgomery, Barefield 15; Rebs: Kazakauskas 12; Asts: Kalaitzakis, Kazakauskas 3 PIR: Kazakauskas 21	Boxscore	Pts: Hayes 19; Rebs: Blaževič 10; Asts: Grigonis 9 PIR: Hayes 22	Arena: Kėdainių arena Attendance: 0 Referees: Tomas Jasevičius, Mindaugas Večerskis, Oleg Barkovskij

9 February 2021 17	Žalgiris (Lithuania)	95–76	(Lithuania) Pieno Žvaigždės	Kaunas
18:50	Scoring by quarter: 19–22, 23–26, 30–19, 23–9
	Pts: Grigonis 26; Rebs: Walkup 8 Asts: Walkup 11; PIR: Grigonis 36	Boxscore	Pts: Manigat 16; Rebs: Želionis 6 Asts: Mirkovich 5 PIR: Mirkovich 23	Arena: Žalgirio arena Attendance: 0 Referees: Gytis Vilius, Aurimas Borusas, Darius Šomka

28 February 2021 18	Žalgiris (Lithuania)	85–72	(Lithuania) Neptūnas	Kaunas
17:20	Scoring by quarter: 22–26, 27–11, 16–17, 20–18
	Pts: Lauvergne 11; Rebs: Jankūnas 9 Asts: Lekavičius 7 PIR: Lekavičius 20	Boxscore	Pts: Dorsey 14; Rebs: Giga 6 Asts: Janavičius 6 PIR: Dorsey 16	Arena: Žalgirio arena Attendance: 0 Referees: Jurgis Laurinavičius, Andrius Maleckas, Gintaras Mačiulis

7 March 2021 19	Juventus (Lithuania)	78–102	(Lithuania) Žalgiris	Utena
17:20	Scoring by quarter: 18-27, 16-24, 24-27, 20-24
	Pts: Crawford 18; Rebs: Matulis 9 Asts: Crawford 5 PIR: Matulis 27	Boxscore	Pts: Grigonis 18; Rebs: five players 4 Asts: Jokubaitis 6 PIR: Jokubaitis 20	Arena: Utenos daugiafunkcis sporto centras Attendance: 0 Referees: Gytis Vilius, Gintaras Vitkauskas, Artūras Šukys

9 March 2021 20	Šiauliai (Lithuania)	74–88	(Lithuania) Žalgiris	Šiauliai
18:50	Scoring by quarter: 9-19, 14-25, 34-24, 17-20
	Pts: Stankevičius 24; Rebs: Urbutis 7 Asts: Friðriksson 8 PIR: Stankevičius 23	Boxscore	Pts: Vasturia 15; Rebs: Blaževič 7 Asts: Walkup 9 PIR: Vasturia 19	Arena: Šiaulių arena Attendance: 0 Referees: Jurgis Laurinavičius, Gvidas Gedvilas, Aurimas Borusas

14 March 2021 21	Žalgiris (Lithuania)	96–60	(Lithuania) Šiauliai	Kaunas
17:20	Scoring by quarter: 18–16, 19–20, 31–14, 28–10
	Pts: Grigonis 17; Rebs: Blaževič 9 Asts: Lekavičius 6 PIR: Grigonis 28	Boxscore	Pts: Friðriksson 15; Rebs: Van Vliet 4 Asts: Friðriksson 5 PIR: Friðriksson 13	Arena: Žalgirio arena Attendance: 0 Referees: Vilius Mačiulaitis, Andžej Urbanovič, Martynas Karaliūnas

23 March 2021 22	Žalgiris (Lithuania)	86–80	(Lithuania) Dzūkija	Kaunas
18:50	Scoring by quarter: 25–20, 22–29, 17–16, 22–15
	Pts: Lauvergne, Jankūnas 16; Rebs: Jankūnas 6 Asts: Walkup 8 PIR: Walkup 22	Boxscore	Pts: Danisevičius 15; Rebs: Staniulis 12; Asts: Danisevičius 5 PIR: Danisevičius 19	Arena: Žalgirio arena Attendance: 0 Referees: Artūras Šukys, Mindaugas Večerskis, Darius Šomka

6 April 2021 23	Lietkabelis (Lithuania)	88–94	(Lithuania) Žalgiris	Panevėžys
18:15	Scoring by quarter: 30-26, 16-32, 18-18, 24-18
	Pts: Vinales 28; Rebs: Gagić 9 Asts: Vinales 7 PIR: Vinales 28	Boxscore	Pts: Jankūnas 21; Rebs: Jankūnas 9 Asts: three players 4 PIR: Jankūnas 35	Arena: Cido arena Attendance: 0 Referees: Gytis Vilius, Gintaras Vitkauskas, Juozas Barkauskas

11 April 2021 24	Žalgiris (Lithuania)	85–86	(Lithuania) Rytas	Kaunas
17:20	Scoring by quarter: 21–23, 19–19, 21–25, 24–19
	Pts: Walkup 21; Rebs: Jankūnas 7 Asts: Grigonis 6 PIR: Walkup 28	Boxscore	Pts: Buva 32; Rebs: Buva, Radzevičius 7 Asts: Bičkauskis 7 PIR: Buva 39	Arena: Žalgirio arena Attendance: 0 Referees: Tomas Jasevičius, Jurgis Laurinavičius, Gintaras Vitkauskas

14 April 2021 25	Dzūkija (Lithuania)	78–95	(Lithuania) Žalgiris	Alytus
18:15	Scoring by quarter: 15–17, 18–26, 19–28, 26–24
	Pts: Čižauskas 16; Rebs: Jasaitis 5 Asts: Danisevičius 5 PIR: Čižauskas 21	Boxscore	Pts: Lekavičius 17; Rebs: Blaževič 9 Asts: Geben 5 PIR: Lekavičius 19	Arena: Alytaus sporto ir rekreacijos centras Attendance: 0 Referees: Gintaras Mačiulis, Andžej Urbanovič, Oleg Barkovskij

16 April 2021 26	Žalgiris (Lithuania)	90–62	(Lithuania) CBet	Kaunas
18:50	Scoring by quarter: 25-14, 17-15, 21-23, 27-10
	Pts: Jokubaitis 17; Rebs: Geben 5 Asts: Walkup 11; PIR: Walkup 28	Boxscore	Pts: Sušinskas 18; Rebs: Sušinskas 8 Asts: Lecomte 3 PIR: Sušinskas 23	Arena: Žalgirio arena Attendance: 0 Referees: Gintaras Vitkauskas, Juozas Barkauskas, Darius Šomka

18 April 2021 27	Neptūnas (Lithuania)	72–88	(Lithuania) Žalgiris	Klaipėda
17:20	Scoring by quarter: 16-17, 15-21, 20-26, 21-24
	Pts: Galdikas, Gailius 13; Rebs: Gailius 6 Asts: Janavičius 6 PIR: Gailius 16	Boxscore	Pts: Walkup, Grigonis 18; Rebs: Jankūnas 7 Asts: Jokubaitis 5 PIR: Walkup, Grigonis 21	Arena: Švyturio arena Attendance: 0 Referees: Gytis Vilius, Mindaugas Večerskis, Gintaras Mačiulis

20 April 2021 28	Žalgiris (Lithuania)	97–79	(Lithuania) Juventus	Kaunas
18:50	Scoring by quarter: 26–16, 30–25, 17–18, 24–20
	Pts: Grigonis 15; Rebs: Lauvergne 5 Asts: Walkup 8 PIR: Grigonis 24	Boxscore	Pts: Skučas 24; Rebs: Kupšas 8 Asts: Kupšas 5 PIR: Skučas 25	Arena: Žalgirio arena Attendance: 150; Referees: Tomas Jasevičius, Gintaras Vitkauskas, Martynas Karaliūnas

22 April 2021 29	Žalgiris (Lithuania)	92–68	(Lithuania) Dzūkija	Kaunas
18:50	Scoring by quarter: 27–10, 29–14, 22–22, 14–22
	Pts: Lauvergne 14; Rebs: Jankūnas 7 Asts: Lekavičius 9 PIR: Lauvergne 21	Boxscore	Pts: Jucikas 14; Rebs: Paulauskas 6 Asts: Danisevičius 4 PIR: Jomantas 13	Arena: Žalgirio arena Attendance: 148; Referees: Jurgis Laurinavičius, Aurimas Borusas, Mantas Butvilas

25 April 2021 30	Šiauliai (Lithuania)	86–105	(Lithuania) Žalgiris	Šiauliai
17:00	Scoring by quarter: 26-25, 19-29, 18-28, 23-23
	Pts: Urbutis 19; Rebs: Van Vliet 12; Asts: Friðriksson 7 PIR: Urbutis 24	Boxscore	Pts: Hayes 18; Rebs: Jankūnas 5 Asts: Walkup 9 PIR: Walkup 22	Arena: Šiaulių arena Attendance: 150; Referees: Gvidas Gedvilas, Mindaugas Večerskis, Šarūnas Gabrilavičius

28 April 2021 31	Rytas (Lithuania)	81–90	(Lithuania) Žalgiris	Vilnius
18:50	Scoring by quarter: 22-21, 21-25, 20-25, 18-19
	Pts: Girdžiūnas, Buva 15; Rebs: Echodas, Radzevičius 9 Asts: Buva, Butkevičius 3 PIR: Echodas 18	Boxscore	Pts: Hayes 18; Rebs: Lauvergne 7 Asts: Walkup 7 PIR: Hayes 24	Arena: Jeep arena Attendance: 150; Referees: Tomas Jasevičius, Gintaras Vitkauskas, Juozas Barkauskas

30 April 2021 32	Žalgiris (Lithuania)	107–83	(Lithuania) Pieno Žvaigždės	Kaunas
18:50	Scoring by quarter: 24–26, 23–17, 37–13, 23–27
	Pts: Hayes 18; Rebs: Geben 8 Asts: three players 4 PIR: Hayes 19	Boxscore	Pts: Franke 16; Rebs: Želionis 6 Asts: Želionis 5 PIR: Franke 18	Arena: Žalgirio arena Attendance: 142; Referees: Artūras Šukys, Mindaugas Večerskis, Martynas Karaliūnas

2 May 2021 33	Žalgiris (Lithuania)	99–66	(Lithuania) Nevėžis-Optibet	Kaunas
17:20	Scoring by quarter: 30-18, 19-16, 25-13, 25-19
	Pts: Hayes 15; Rebs: Lauvergne 9 Asts: Jokubaitis 8 PIR: Rubit 20	Boxscore	Pts: Hukporti 17; Rebs: Vasiliauskas 7 Asts: Barefield 4 PIR: Hukporti 14	Arena: Žalgirio arena Attendance: 148; Referees: Vilius Mačiulaitis, Aurimas Borusas, Darius Šomka

5 May 2021 34	Žalgiris (Lithuania)	70–68	(Lithuania) Lietkabelis	Kaunas
18:50	Scoring by quarter: 19-18, 16-15, 14-12, 21-23
	Pts: Hayes, Lauvergne 12; Rebs: Geben, Lauvergne 6 Asts: Walkup 11; PIR: Walkup 27	Boxscore	Pts: Normantas 19; Rebs: Masiulis 7 Asts: Normantas 4 PIR: Normantas 20	Arena: Žalgirio arena Attendance: 150; Referees: Jurgis Laurinavičius, Artūras Šukys, Gintaras Mačiulis

7 May 2021 35	Pieno Žvaigždės (Lithuania)	63–93	(Lithuania) Žalgiris	Pasvalys
18:00	Scoring by quarter: 13–21, 19–26, 11–26, 20–20
	Pts: Želionis 15; Rebs: Franke 7 Asts: Petrilevičius 4 PIR: Franke 14	Boxscore	Pts: Grigonis 20; Rebs: Blaževič, Hayes 5 Asts: Jokubaitis, Walkup 5 PIR: Grigonis 18	Arena: Pieno žvaigždžių arena Referees: Gvidas Gedvilas, Andžej Urbanovič, Oleg Barkovskij

10 May 2021 36	CBet (Lithuania)	81–101	(Lithuania) Žalgiris	Prienai
18:30	Scoring by quarter: 17–33, 24–27, 23–23, 17–18
	Pts: Pacevičius 15; Rebs: Pacevičius 7 Asts: Lecomte 8 PIR: Pacevičius 21	Boxscore	Pts: Grigonis 26; Rebs: Lauvergne 7 Asts: three players 5 PIR: Grigonis 32	Arena: Prienų sporto arena Attendance: 120; Referees: Jurgis Laurinavičius, Gintaras Mačiulis, Mindaugas Večerskis

==== Playoffs ====
12 May 2021 Quarter-finals 1	Žalgiris (Lithuania)	81–74	(Lithuania) Pieno Žvaigždės	Kaunas
18:30	Scoring by quarter: 28-20, 24-16, 21-19, 8-19
	Pts: Grigonis 16; Rebs: Lauvergne 8 Asts: Walkup 7 PIR: Lauvergne 21	Boxscore	Pts: Giedraitis 19; Rebs: Želionis 8 Asts: Petrilevičius 5 PIR: Želionis 21	Arena: Žalgirio arena Attendance: 150; Referees: Gytis Vilius, Andrius Maleckas, Mindaugas Večerskis

15 May 2021 Quarter-finals 2	Pieno Žvaigždės (Lithuania)	81–100	(Lithuania) Žalgiris	Pasvalys
16:30	Scoring by quarter: 24–30, 25–17, 13–27, 19–26
	Pts: Manigat 23; Rebs: Petrilevičius 6 Asts: Franke 7 PIR: Šikšnius 20	Boxscore	Pts: Hayes 23; Rebs: Lauvergne 9 Asts: Walkup 6 PIR: Lauvergne 23	Arena: Pieno žvaigždžių arena Referees: Tomas Jasevičius, Vilius Mačiulaitis, Andžej Urbanovič

24 May 2021 Semi-finals 1	Žalgiris (Lithuania)	100–75	(Lithuania) Juventus	Kaunas
18:50	Scoring by quarter: 23-23, 35-16, 17-16, 25-20
	Pts: Walkup, Lauvergne 17; Rebs: Jankūnas 8 Asts: Grigonis 6 PIR: Lauvergne 26	Boxscore	Pts: Kupšas 18; Rebs: Kupšas 5 Asts: Šulskis 6 PIR: Kupšas 20	Arena: Žalgirio arena Attendance: 164; Referees: Tomas Jasevičius, Gytis Vilius, Vilius Mačiulaitis

26 May 2021 Semi-finals 2	Juventus (Lithuania)	80–116	(Lithuania) Žalgiris	Utena
18:50	Scoring by quarter: 22–23, 16–25, 26–33, 16–35
	Pts: Kupšas 23; Rebs: Urbonas 7 Asts: Crawford 5 PIR: Kupšas 25	Boxscore	Pts: Jokubaitis 19; Rebs: three players 4 Asts: three players 5 PIR: Jokubaitis 25	Arena: Utenos daugiafunkcis sporto centras Attendance: 142; Referees: Jurgis Laurinavičius, Artūras Šukys, Gintaras Mačiulis

29 May 2021 Semi-finals 3	Žalgiris (Lithuania)	93–75	(Lithuania) Juventus	Kaunas
17:20	Scoring by quarter: 30-22, 25-10, 24-21, 14-22
	Pts: Grigonis 18; Rebs: Geben 10; Asts: Walkup 5 PIR: Grigonis 25	Boxscore	Pts: Kupšas 23; Rebs: Kupšas, Šulskis 7 Asts: Urbonas, Crawford 5 PIR: Kupšas 30	Arena: Žalgirio arena Attendance: 185; Referees: Tomas Jasevičius, Vilius Mačiulaitis, Andžej Urbanovič

2 June 2021 Finals 1	Žalgiris (Lithuania)	90–75	(Lithuania) Rytas	Kaunas
18:50	Scoring by quarter: 23-23, 28-12, 20-24, 19-16
	Pts: Lauvergne 18; Rebs: Lauvergne 10; Asts: Walkup 7 PIR: Lauvergne 27	Boxscore	Pts: Buva 22; Rebs: Echodas 6 Asts: Bičkauskis 5 PIR: Buva 25	Arena: Žalgirio arena Attendance: 1044; Referees: Tomas Jasevičius, Jurgis Laurinavičius, Andrius Maleckas

5 June 2021 Finals 2	Rytas (Lithuania)	70–92	(Lithuania) Žalgiris	Vilnius
17:20	Scoring by quarter: 16–25, 23–21, 15–21, 16–25
	Pts: Goudelock 17; Rebs: Echodas, Butkevičius 6 Asts: Girdžiūnas 4 PIR: Radzevičius 15	Boxscore	Pts: Hayes 15; Rebs: Jankūnas 5 Asts: Walkup 6 PIR: Walkup 20	Arena: Jeep arena Attendance: 1351; Referees: Gytis Vilius, Tomas Jasevičius, Artūras Šukys

7 Jun 2021 Finals 3	Žalgiris (Lithuania)	84–73	(Lithuania) Rytas	Kaunas
18:50	Scoring by quarter: 16–15, 25–23, 23–15, 20–20
	Pts: Walkup 20; Rebs: Lauvergne 7 Asts: Grigonis 6 PIR: Walkup 25	Boxscore	Pts: Goudelock 25; Rebs: Buva 9 Asts: Goudelock 3 PIR: Buva 25	Arena: Žalgiris Arena; Attendance: 1809; Referees: Gytis Vilius, Gintaras Vitkauskas, Gvidas Gedvilas

=== EuroLeague ===
==== Regular season ====
Pos	Team	Pld	W	L	PF	PA	PD
9	(Spain) Valencia Basket	34	19	15	2762	2743	+19
10	(Spain) TD Systems Baskonia	34	18	16	2742	2619	+123
11	(Lithuania) Žalgiris	34	17	17	2630	2645	−15
12	(Greece) Olympiacos	34	16	18	2628	2674	−46
13	(Israel) Maccabi Tel Aviv	34	14	20	2608	2642	−34

Source: EuroLeague
Rules for classification: All points scored in extra period(s) will not be counted in the standings, nor for any tie-break situation.

==== Results summary ====
Overall						Home					Away				
Pld	W	L	PF	PA	PD	W	L	PF	PA	PD	W	L	PF	PA	PD
34	17	17	2630	2645	−15	10	7	1418	1323	+95	7	10	1212	1322	−110

Last updated: complete.
Source: Competitive matches

==== Results by round ====
Round	1	2	3	4	5	6	7	8	9	10	11	12	13	14	15	16	17	18	19	20	21	22	23	24	25	26	27	28	29	30	31	32	33	34
Ground	A	A	A	H	H	A	H	A	H	A	H	H	A	H	H	H	A	H	A	A	H	A	H	A	H	A	H	A	H	A	A	H	H	A
Result	W	W	W	W	L	W	L	L	L	L	L	L	W	W	W	W	W	W	L	L	W	W	L	W	L	L	W	L	L	L	L	W	L	W
Position	8	3	1	1	3	1	2	8	10	10	11	11	11	9	8	8	6	5	7	8	6	6	7	7	9	10	9	9	11	11	11	11	11	11

Last updated: complete.
Source: Competitive matches
Ground: A = Away; H = Home; R = Rest. Result: L = Loss; W = Win; R = Rest; P = Postponed.

Win Loss

==== Matches ====
1 October 2020 1	Olympiacos (Greece)	67–68	(Lithuania) Žalgiris	Piraeus
20:00 (CET)	Scoring by quarter: 18–23, 19–11, 21–13, 9–21
	Pts: Martin 12; Rebs: Vezenkov 5 Asts: Sloukas 7 PIR: Martin 16	Boxscore	Pts: Grigonis 15; Rebs: Hayes 7 Asts: Grigonis 4 PIR: Grigonis 17	Arena: Peace and Friendship Stadium; Attendance: 0 Referees: Carmelo Paternicò, Mehdi Difallah, Amit Balak

10 October 2020 2	Khimki (Russia)	70–84	(Lithuania) Žalgiris	Khimki
19:00 (CET)	Scoring by quarter: 20-17, 12-24, 16-26, 22-17
	Pts: Jerebko 23; Rebs: Jerebko 12; Asts: Vialtsev 5 PIR: Jerebko 30	Boxscore	Pts: Grigonis 21; Rebs: Geben 6 Asts: Walkup 6 PIR: Grigonis 23	Arena: Mytishchi Arena; Attendance: 627; Referees: Ilija Belošević, Emin Moğulkoç, Robert Vyklický

13 October 2020 3	Crvena Zvezda (Serbia)	69–75	(Lithuania) Žalgiris	Belgrade
19:00 (CET)	Scoring by quarter: 19-19, 14-20, 27-23, 9-13
	Pts: Loyd 19; Rebs: Kuzmić 6 Asts: four players 4 PIR: Loyd 16	Boxscore	Pts: Lekavičius 16; Rebs: Lauvergne 8 Asts: Jokubaitis 5 PIR: Lekavičius 20	Arena: Aleksandar Nikolić Hall; Attendance: 0 Referees: Anne Panther, Carlos Cortés, Spiros Gkontas

15 October 2020 4	Žalgiris (Lithuania)	89–73	(Turkey) Anadolu Efes	Kaunas
19:00 (CET)	Scoring by quarter: 25–16, 16–19, 25–20, 23–18
	Pts: Hayes 17; Rebs: Lauvergne 8 Asts: three players 5 PIR: Hayes 23	Boxscore	Pts: Dunston 20; Rebs: Anderson 5 Asts: Simon 6 PIR: Dunston 32	Arena: Žalgiris Arena; Attendance: 5,011; Referees: Carlos Peruga, Piotr Pastusiak, Gentian Cici

22 October 2020 5	Žalgiris (Lithuania)	82–94	(Spain) Valencia Basket	Kaunas
19:00 (CET)	Scoring by quarter: 27–22, 18–15, 12–30, 25–27
	Pts: Rubit, Grigonis 12; Rebs: Hayes 6 Asts: Lekavičius 5 PIR: Lekavičius 21	Boxscore	Pts: Marinković, Dubljević 16; Rebs: Tobey 6 Asts: Van Rossom 8 PIR: Dubljević 21	Arena: Žalgiris Arena; Attendance: 5,131; Referees: Robert Lottermoser, Rain Peerandi, Sinan İşgüder

29 October 2020 6	LDLC ASVEL (France)	74–83	(Lithuania) Žalgiris	Villeurbanne
18:00 (CET)	Scoring by quarter: 23-13, 27-28, 10-16, 14-26
	Pts: Kahudi 18; Rebs: Fall 8 Asts: three players 4 PIR: Fall 27	Boxscore	Pts: Grigonis 25; Rebs: Walkup 7 Asts: Walkup 7 PIR: Grigonis 27	Arena: Astroballe; Attendance: 1,000; Referees: Christos Christodoulou, Jordi Aliaga, Marcin Kowalski

6 November 2020 7	Žalgiris (Lithuania)	90–93	(Spain) Real Madrid	Kaunas
19:00 (CET)	Scoring by quarter: 24–32, 30–16, 19–19, 17–26
	Pts: Walkup 18; Rebs: Walkup 7 Asts: Walkup 9 PIR: Walkup 29	Boxscore	Pts: Tavares 22; Rebs: Tavares 12; Asts: Campazzo 10; PIR: Tavares 34	Arena: Žalgiris Arena; Attendance: 239; Referees: Sasa Pukl, Joseph Bissang, Anne Panther

12 November 2020 8	Maccabi Tel Aviv (Israel)	85–57	(Lithuania) Žalgiris	Tel Aviv
20:05 (CET)	Scoring by quarter: 24–14, 29–9, 19–21, 13–13
	Pts: Dorsey 16; Rebs: Žižić 8 Asts: Dorsey 4 PIR: Dorsey 21	Boxscore	Pts: Walkup 12; Rebs: Walkup, Jankūnas 6 Asts: Lauvergne 3 PIR: Lauvergne 14	Arena: Menora Mivtachim Arena; Attendance: 0 Referees: Robert Lottermoser, Carlos Peruga, Igor Dragojević

17 November 2020 9	Žalgiris (Lithuania)	78–87	(Russia) CSKA Moscow	Kaunas
19:00 (CET)	Scoring by quarter: 17–26, 21–19, 20–21, 20–21
	Pts: Grigonis 19; Rebs: Jankūnas 6 Asts: Walkup 7 PIR: Grigonis 24	Boxscore	Pts: Mike James 27; Rebs: Milutinov 7 Asts: Mike James 5 PIR: Mike James 32	Arena: Žalgiris Arena; Attendance: 0 Referees: Ilija Belošević, Carlos Cortés, Ioannis Foufis

20 November 2020 10	AX Armani Exchange Milan (Italy)	98–92	(Lithuania) Žalgiris	Milan
20:45 (CET)	Scoring by quarter: 21–25, 31–15, 21–24, 25–28
	Pts: Punter 22; Rebs: Hines, LeDay 6 Asts: Rodríguez 5 PIR: Punter 29	Boxscore	Pts: Lekavičius 16; Rebs: Rubit 7 Asts: Walkup 8 PIR: Rubit 22	Arena: Mediolanum Forum; Attendance: 0 Referees: Emilio Pérez, Sašo Petek, Sérgio Silva

26 November 2020 11	Žalgiris (Lithuania)	75–83	(Russia) Zenit Saint Petersburg	Kaunas
19:00 (CET)	Scoring by quarter: 15–23, 17–22, 19–21, 24–17
	Pts: Grigonis 18; Rebs: Lauvergne 8 Asts: Walkup 4 PIR: Grigonis 22	Boxscore	Pts: Hollins 20; Rebs: Thomas 7 Asts: Pangos 7 PIR: Hollins 19	Arena: Žalgiris Arena; Attendance: 0 Referees: Matej Boltauzer, Oļegs Latiševs, Anne Panther

4 December 2020 12	Žalgiris (Lithuania)	62–73	(Spain) Barcelona	Kaunas
19:00 (CET)	Scoring by quarter: 14–17, 19–22, 15–16, 14–18
	Pts: Jokubaitis 15; Rebs: Hayes 6 Asts: Walkup, Hayes 4 PIR: Hayes 18	Boxscore	Pts: Davies 16; Rebs: Calathes 5 Asts: Calathes 10; PIR: Davies 22	Arena: Žalgiris Arena; Attendance: 0 Referees: Saša Pukl, Tomislav Hordov, Michele Rossi

11 December 2020 13	Panathinaikos OPAP (Greece)	69–81	(Lithuania) Žalgiris	Marousi
20:00 (CET)	Scoring by quarter: 12–24, 21–19, 17–17, 19–21
	Pts: Nedović 12; Rebs: Papagiannis 11; Asts: three players 4 PIR: Papagiannis 20	Boxscore	Pts: Grigonis 24; Rebs: Rubit, Lauvergne 8 Asts: Walkup 8 PIR: Grigonis 24	Arena: O.A.K.A. Attendance: 0 Referees: Daniel Hierrezuelo, Fernando Rocha, Mehdi Difallah

15 December 2020 14	Žalgiris (Lithuania)	92–73	(Spain) TD Systems Baskonia	Kaunas
19:00 (CET)	Scoring by quarter: 25–22, 19–14, 24–11, 24–26
	Pts: Milaknis 15; Rebs: Rubit 7 Asts: Jokubaitis, Grigonis 5 PIR: Lekavičius 16	Boxscore	Pts: Fall 14; Rebs: Polonara 7 Asts: Henry 9 PIR: Fall 19	Arena: Žalgiris Arena; Attendance: 0 Referees: Sreten Radović, Emin Moğulkoç, Amit Balak

17 December 2020 15	Žalgiris (Lithuania)	99–62	(Turkey) Fenerbahçe Beko	Kaunas
19:00 (CET)	Scoring by quarter: 24–7, 27–24, 30–16, 18–15
	Pts: Rubit 18; Rebs: Hayes 7 Asts: Grigonis 7 PIR: Rubit 27	Boxscore	Pts: de Colo 14; Rebs: de Colo 6 Asts: de Colo 3 PIR: de Colo 20	Arena: Žalgiris Arena; Attendance: 0 Referees: Saša Pukl, Carmelo Paternicò, Emilio Pérez

23 December 2020 16	Žalgiris (Lithuania)	74–73	(Germany) Bayern Munich	Kaunas
18:00 (CET)	Scoring by quarter: 22–16, 18–19, 16–16, 18–22
	Pts: Grigonis 22; Rebs: Lauvergne 6 Asts: Lekavičius 5 PIR: Grigonis 23	Boxscore	Pts: Reynolds 17; Rebs: Reynolds 7 Asts: Seeley 5 PIR: Reynolds 20	Arena: Žalgiris Arena; Attendance: 0 Referees: Miguel Ángel Pérez, Fernando Rocha, Joseph Bissang

29 December 2020 17	ALBA Berlin (Germany)	71–74	(Lithuania) Žalgiris	Berlin
20:00 (CET)	Scoring by quarter: 14–12, 23–19, 11–23, 23–20
	Pts: Fontecchio 14; Rebs: Giffey 7 Asts: Granger, Sikma 5 PIR: Fontecchio, Sikma 16	Boxscore	Pts: Hayes 18; Rebs: Jankūnas, Lauvergne 7 Asts: Grigonis 5 PIR: Hayes 24	Arena: Mercedes-Benz Arena; Attendance: 0 Referees: Robert Vyklický, Piotr Pastusiak, Uroš Obrknežević

8 January 2021 18	Žalgiris (Lithuania)	102–75	(Russia) Khimki	Kaunas
19:00 (CET)	Scoring by quarter: 22–20, 17–28, 39–13, 24–14
	Pts: Lauvergne 29; Rebs: Lauvergne 9 Asts: Grigonis 8 PIR: Lauvergne 38	Boxscore	Pts: Shved 22; Rebs: Booker 7 Asts: Shved 8 PIR: Booker 28	Arena: Žalgiris Arena; Attendance: 0 Referees: Sreten Radović, Anne Panther, Tomasz Trawicki

13 January 2021 19	CSKA Moscow (Russia)	83–73	(Lithuania) Žalgiris	Moscow
18:00 (CET)	Scoring by quarter: 18–11, 27–21, 15–20, 23–21
	Pts: James 21; Rebs: Milutinov 14; Asts: Kurbanov 7 PIR: Milutinov 22	Boxscore	Pts: Grigonis 16; Rebs: Rubit 7 Asts: Lauvergne, Walkup 5 PIR: Grigonis, Walkup 14	Arena: Megasport Arena; Attendance: 3,120; Referees: Robert Lottermoser, Emin Moğulkoç, Gentian Cici

15 January 2021 20	Zenit Saint Petersburg (Russia)	77–65	(Lithuania) Žalgiris	Saint Petersburg
18:00 (CET)	Scoring by quarter: 17–14, 19–22, 20–13, 21–16
	Pts: Ponitka, Gudaitis 15; Rebs: Gudaitis 8 Asts: Pangos 7 PIR: Gudaitis 28	Boxscore	Pts: Walkup 12; Rebs: Jankūnas, Geben 4 Asts: five players 2 PIR: Walkup 13	Arena: Sibur Arena; Attendance: 710; Referees: Ilija Belošević, Tomislav Hordov, Robert Vyklický

22 January 2021 21	Žalgiris (Lithuania)	81–79	(Greece) Olympiacos	Kaunas
19:00 (CET)	Scoring by quarter: 26–20, 19–24, 18–16, 18–19
	Pts: Lauvergne 21; Rebs: Lauvergne 7 Asts: Grigonis 7 PIR: Lauvergne 27	Boxscore	Pts: Sloukas, Printezis 16; Rebs: Vezenkov 7 Asts: Sloukas 6 PIR: Vezenkov 18	Arena: Žalgiris Arena; Attendance: 0 Referees: Daniel Hierrezuelo, Ilija Belošević, Carmelo Paternicò

27 January 2021 22	Valencia Basket (Spain)	78–79	(Lithuania) Žalgiris	Valencia
21:00 (CET)	Scoring by quarter: 20–20, 18–27, 17–13, 23–19
	Pts: Prepelič 18; Rebs: Tobey 9 Asts: Van Rossom 4 PIR: Prepelič 20	Boxscore	Pts: Rubit 17; Rebs: Lauvergne 12; Asts: Jokubaitis 6 PIR: Rubit 17	Arena: La Fonteta; Attendance: 0 Referees: Fernando Rocha, Sašo Petek, Spiros Gkontas

29 January 2021 23	TD Systems Baskonia (Spain)	81–68	(Lithuania) Žalgiris	Vitoria-Gasteiz
21:00 (CET)	Scoring by quarter: 21–20, 24–16, 16–12, 20–20
	Pts: Henry 19; Rebs: Jekiri, Peters 7 Asts: Peters 5 PIR: Peters 23	Boxscore	Pts: Grigonis 17; Rebs: Lauvergne 9 Asts: Lauvergne, Walkup 4 PIR: Lauvergne 21	Arena: Buesa Arena; Attendance: 0 Referees: Luigi Lamonica, Emin Moğulkoç, Rain Peerandi

18 February 2021 24	Barcelona (Spain)	86–62	(Lithuania) Žalgiris	Barcelona
21:00 (CET)	Scoring by quarter: 24–24, 24–13, 23–10, 15–15
	Pts: Higgins, Oriola 19; Rebs: Oriola 7 Asts: Bolmaro 6 PIR: Higgins, Oriola 27	Boxscore	Pts: Hayes 9 Rebs: Rubit 7 Asts: Grigonis, Walkup 4 PIR: Grigonis 10	Arena: Palau Blaugrana; Referees: Borys Ryzhyk, Piotr Pastusiak, Sergio Silva

23 February 2021 25	Žalgiris (Lithuania)	75–62	(Serbia) Crvena zvezda mts	Kaunas
19:00 (CET)	Scoring by quarter: 22–26, 18–18, 20–14, 15–4
	Pts: Grigonis 17; Rebs: Rubit 8 Asts: Walkup 7 PIR: Grigonis 24	Boxscore	Pts: Loyd, Simonović 16; Rebs: Dobrić, Kuzmić 5 Asts: Davidovac 5 PIR: Loyd 17	Arena: Žalgiris Arena; Referees: Mehdi Difallah, Emilio Pérez, Rain Peerandi

25 February 2021 26	Real Madrid (Spain)	70–58	(Lithuania) Žalgiris	Madrid
21:00 (CET)	Scoring by quarter: 21–13, 15–18, 15–11, 19–16
	Pts: Deck 14; Rebs: Tavares 9 Asts: Alocén 6 PIR: Deck 19	Boxscore	Pts: Jankūnas 13; Rebs: Jankūnas 7 Asts: Jokubaitis 4 PIR: Jankūnas 23	Arena: WiZink Center; Referees: Damir Javor, Milivoje Jovčić, Kristaps Konstantinovs

2 March 2021 27	Žalgiris (Lithuania)	85–75	(France) LDLC ASVEL	Kaunas
19:00 (CET)	Scoring by quarter: 17–20, 23–22, 27–15, 18–18
	Pts: Grigonis 21; Rebs: Jankūnas 9 Asts: Jokubaitis 5 PIR: Lauvergne 19	Boxscore	Pts: Yabusele 17; Rebs: M. Fall 7 Asts: Cole 5 PIR: Cole 20	Arena: Žalgiris Arena; Referees: Luigi Lamonica, Miloš Koljenšić, Ioannis Foufis

5 March 2021 28	Žalgiris (Lithuania)	64–69	(Italy) AX Armani Exchange Milan	Kaunas
19:00 (CET)	Scoring by quarter: 13–19, 19–15, 13–16, 19–19
	Pts: Grigonis 17; Rebs: Lauvergne 9 Asts: Walkup 4 PIR: Lauvergne 24	Boxscore	Pts: Shields 23; Rebs: Hines 7 Asts: Punter 4 PIR: Shields 27	Arena: Žalgiris Arena; Referees: Christos Christodoulou, Milan Nedovic, Marcin Kowalski

12 March 2021 29	Anadolu Efes (Turkey)	89–62	(Lithuania) Žalgiris	Istanbul
18:30 (CET)	Scoring by quarter: 26–12, 23–16, 27–20, 13–14
	Pts: Larkin 18; Rebs: Dunston, Simon 5 Asts: three players 4 PIR: Micić 25	Boxscore	Pts: Walkup 15; Rebs: Jankūnas, Rubit 8 Asts: Walkup 8 PIR: Rubit 17	Arena: Sinan Erdem Dome; Attendance: 0 Referees: Matej Boltauzer, Ilija Belošević, Spiros Gkontas

18 March 2021 30	Fenerbahçe Beko (Turkey)	84–61	(Lithuania) Žalgiris	Istanbul
18:45 (CET)	Scoring by quarter: 28–18, 17–8, 21–20, 18–15
	Pts: Veselý 21; Rebs: Veselý 10; Asts: De Colo 6 PIR: Veselý 32	Boxscore	Pts: Lekavičius 12; Rebs: Jankūnas 7 Asts: Grigonis 8 PIR: Grigonis 15	Arena: Ülker Sports and Event Hall; Attendance: 250; Referees: Miguel Angel Pérez, Milivoje Jovčić, Mario Majkić

25 March 2021 31	Žalgiris (Lithuania)	81–88	(Israel) Maccabi Tel Aviv	Kaunas
20:00 (CET)	Scoring by quarter: 26–18, 14–20, 23–26, 18–24
	Pts: Hayes 24; Rebs: Lauvergne 9 Asts: Grigonis 6 PIR: Hayes 30	Boxscore	Pts: Bender 16; Rebs: Casspi 8 Asts: Jones 6 PIR: Jones 21	Arena: Žalgiris Arena; Attendance: 0 Referees: Luigi Lamonica, Anne Panther, Piotr Pastusiak

30 March 2021 32	Žalgiris (Lithuania)	96–86	(Germany) ALBA Berlin	Kaunas
19:00 (CET)	Scoring by quarter: 21–23, 20–28, 27–10, 28–25
	Pts: Lekavičius 21; Rebs: Jankūnas 8 Asts: Lekavičius, Walkup 5 PIR: Geben 23	Boxscore	Pts: Eriksson 19; Rebs: Koumadje 5 Asts: Siva 6 PIR: Siva 21	Arena: Žalgiris Arena; Attendance: 0 Referees: Damir Javor, Seffi Shemmesh, Aare Halliko

1 April 2021 33	Bayern Munich (Germany)	71–70	(Lithuania) Žalgiris	Munich
20:30 (CET)	Scoring by quarter: 21–22, 16–14, 20–18, 14–16
	Pts: Lučić 13; Rebs: Lučić 6 Asts: Šiško 6 PIR: Lučić 18	Boxscore	Pts: Walkup 16; Rebs: Hayes, Lauvergne 6 Asts: Grigonis, Lekavičius 5 PIR: Walkup 26	Arena: Audi Dome; Attendance: 0 Referees: Ilija Belošević, Sašo Petek, Carlos Cortes

8 April 2021 34	Žalgiris (Lithuania)	93–78	(Greece) Panathinaikos OPAP	Kaunas
19:00 (CET)	Scoring by quarter: 27–14, 25–33, 22–13, 19–18
	Pts: Lekavičius 20; Rebs: Jankūnas 7 Asts: Grigonis, Walkup 5 PIR: Walkup 29	Boxscore	Pts: Nedović 17; Rebs: Mitoglou 7 Asts: Mack 6 PIR: Nedović 21	Arena: Žalgiris Arena; Attendance: 0 Referees: Daniel Hierrenzuelo, Tomislav Hordov, Artem Lavukhin

=== King Mindaugas Cup ===
The 2021 King Mindaugas Cup was 6th instance of the tournament presented to public on 1 December 2015, to replace the LKF Cup and the LKL All-Star Day. Final Four tournament was held in Cido arena, Panevėžys. Due to COVID-19 pandemic, this tournament, for the first time in its history, was held without spectators. Žalgiris retained the King Mindaugas Cup title, defeating Lietkabelis 76:69 after a strong 4th quarter performance. Thomas Walkup led the way for the champions. He scored 18 points, dished out 8 assists, stole the ball 5 times, and collected 26 efficiency score. Although, Joffrey Lauvergne received the tournament MVP award. He lit up Neptūnas basket with 28 points and scored 11 against Lietkabelis.

Win Loss

5 January 2021 Quarterfinals 1	Pieno žvaigždės (Lithuania)	82–98	(Lithuania) Žalgiris	Pasvalys
18:00	Scoring by quarter: 26-25, 24-28, 17-23, 15-22
	Pts: Milutinović, Petrilevičius 18; Rebs: Petrilevičius 8 Asts: Mirković 6 PIR: Petrilevičius 19	Boxscore	Pts: Lauvergne 22; Rebs: Lauvergne 6 Asts: Grigonis 9 PIR: Grigonis 25	Arena: Pieno žvaigždžių arena Attendance: 0 Referees: Vilius Mačiulaitis, Mindaugas Večerskis, Gintaras Mačiulis

18 January 2021 Quarterfinals 2	Žalgiris (Lithuania)	103–77	(Lithuania) Pieno žvaigždės	Kaunas
19:00	Scoring by quarter: 30-18, 24-19, 22-27, 27-13
	Pts: Lekavičius 28; Rebs: Geben, Rubit 7 Asts: Jokubaitis 8 PIR: Lekavičius 25	Boxscore	Pts: Želionis 20; Rebs: Amigo 5 Asts: Mirković 8 PIR: Mirković 19	Arena: Žalgirio arena Attendance: 0 Referees: Jurgis Laurinavičius, Andrius Maleckas, Darius Šomka

13 February 2020 Semifinals	Žalgiris (Lithuania)	84–72	(Lithuania) Neptūnas	Panevėžys
16:30	Scoring by quarter: 15-21, 23-14, 17-18, 29-19
	Pts: Lauvergne 28; Rebs: Lauvergne 10; Asts: Walkup 6 PIR: Lauvergne 32	Boxscore	Pts: Giga 16; Rebs: Giga 7 Asts: Giga 5 PIR: Giga 24	Arena: Cido arena Referees: Tomas Jasevičius, Gintaras Vitkauskas, Juozas Barkauskas

14 February 2021 Final	Žalgiris (Lithuania)	76–69	(Lithuania) Lietkabelis	Panevėžys
17:50	Scoring by quarter: 19-8, 18-20, 21-13, 18-28
	Pts: Walkup 18; Rebs: Jankūnas 6 Asts: Walkup 8 PIR: Walkup 26	Boxscore	Pts: Vinales 17; Rebs: Maldūnas 9 Asts: Maldūnas, Vinales 4 PIR: Maldūnas 20	Arena: Cido arena Referees: Gytis Vilius, Tomas Jasevičius, Artūras Šukys
