= LKL Most Valuable Player Award =

Basketball accolade

The LKL Most Valuable Player Award is the annual award that is given by the Lithuanian Basketball League (LKL), the top-tier professional basketball league in Lithuania, to its Most Valuable Player of each regular season. The award was presented by LKL for the first time after 1993–94 LKL season. Since 1993–94 LKL season, four players have won the award more than once: Tanoka Beard (4-time winner), Gintaras Einikis, Andrius Giedraitis and Ramūnas Šiškauskas (2-time winners). Lithuanian players won the most MVPs. The MVP is being awarded after regular season, the player is elected by the league.

== LKL Season MVPs ==
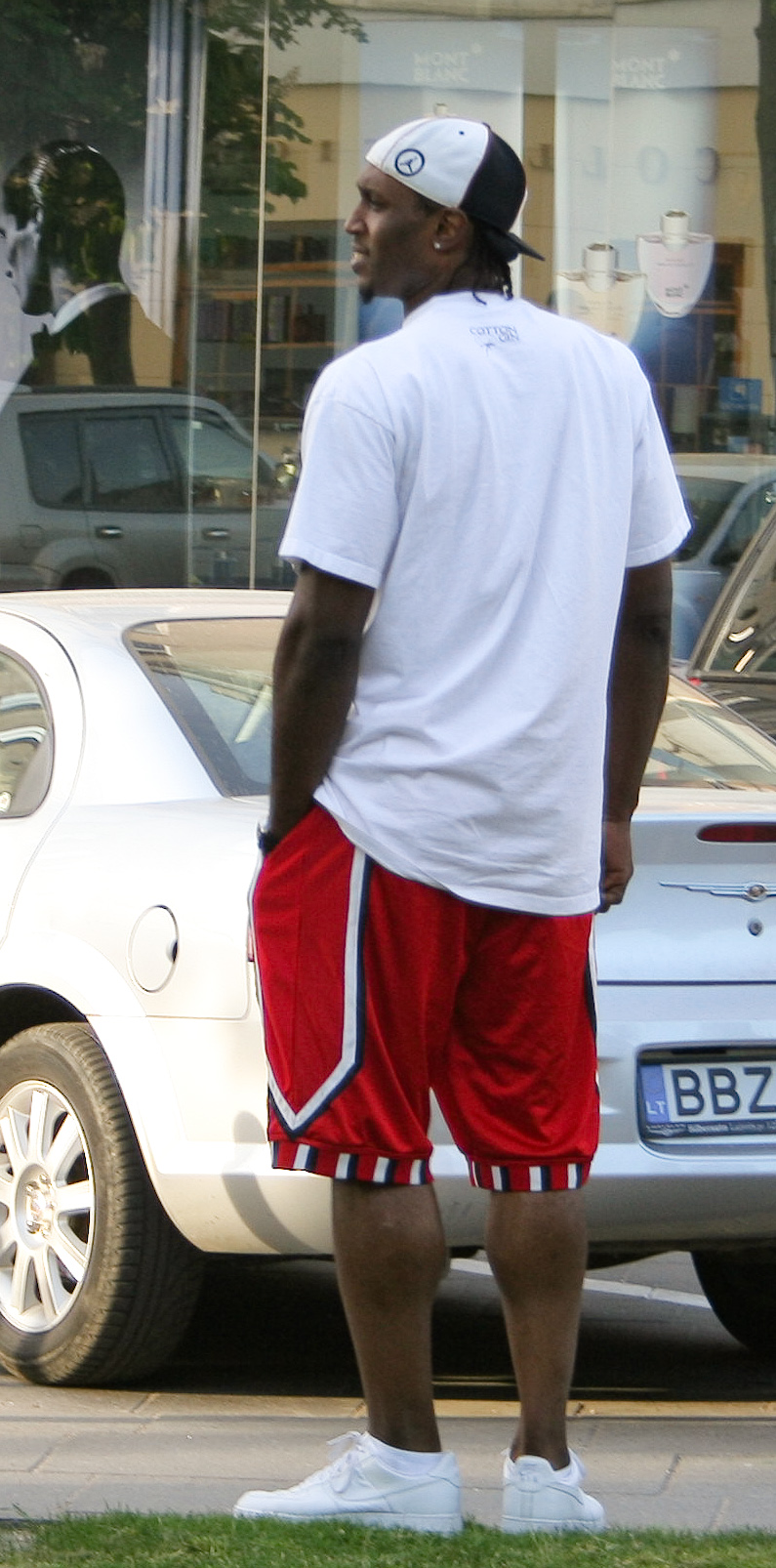
Tanoka Beard was a four-time LKL MVP (2003, 2004, 2005, 2007)

†	Denotes player whose team won championship that year
Player (X)	Denotes the number of times the player had been named MVP at that time

Season	Player	Position	Nationality	Team
1993–94†	Gintaras Einikis	Center	Lithuania	Žalgiris
1994–95†	Gintaras Einikis (2)	Center	Lithuania	Žalgiris
1995–96	Tim Brooks	Guard	United States	Olimpas Plungė
1996–97	Andrius Giedraitis	Guard	Lithuania	Sakalai
1997–98	Andrius Giedraitis (2)	Guard	Lithuania	Sakalai
1998–99	N/A			
1999–00	Mindaugas Timinskas	Forward	Lithuania	Žalgiris
2000–01	Ramūnas Šiškauskas	Guard/forward	Lithuania	Lietuvos rytas
2001–02†	Ramūnas Šiškauskas (2)	Guard/forward	Lithuania	Lietuvos rytas
2002–03†	Tanoka Beard	Forward/center	United States	Žalgiris
2003–04†	Tanoka Beard (2)	Forward/center	United States	Žalgiris
2004–05†	Tanoka Beard (3)	Forward/center	United States	Žalgiris
2005–06	Darjuš Lavrinovič	Forward/center	Lithuania	Žalgiris
2006–07†	Tanoka Beard (4)	Forward/center	United States	Žalgiris
2007–08	Donatas Zavackas	Forward	Lithuania	Šiauliai
2008–09†	Chuck Eidson	Forward/guard	United States	Lietuvos rytas
2009–10	Egidijus Dimša	Center	Lithuania	Nevėžis
2010–11	Aurimas Kieža	Forward	Lithuania	Juventus
2011–12	Jonas Valančiūnas	Center	Lithuania	Lietuvos rytas
2012–13	Gediminas Orelik	Forward	Lithuania	Prienai
2013–14	Juan Palacios	Forward/center	Colombia	Lietuvos rytas
2014–15	Antanas Kavaliauskas	Forward/center	Lithuania	Lietuvos rytas
2015–16	Vytautas Šulskis	Forward	Lithuania	Vytautas
2016–17	Jamar Diggs	Guard	United States	Juventus
2017–18	Laurynas Birutis	Center	Lithuania	Šiauliai
2018–19	Martinas Geben	Center	Lithuania	Juventus
2019–20	N/A			
2020–21	Elvar Már Friðriksson	Guard	Iceland	Šiauliai
2021–22	Ivan Buva	Center	Croatia	Rytas
2022–23	Ahmad Caver	Guard	United States	Wolves
2023–24	Ąžuolas Tubelis	Forward	Lithuania	Neptūnas
2024–25	Anthony Cowan Jr.	Guard	United States	Wolves Twinsbet
2025–26	Arnas Velička	Point guard	Lithuania	Neptūnas

Source for the MVPs since the 2009–10 LKL season.

== Awards won by club ==
Country	Total
Žalgiris	9
Lietuvos rytas / Rytas	7
Šiauliai	3
Juventus	3
Wolves	2
Sakalai	2
Prienai / Vytautas	2
Neptūnas	2
Nevėžis	1

== Awards won by nationality ==
Country	Total
Lithuania	20
United States	8
Colombia	1
Iceland	1
Croatia	1

== See also ==
- LKL Finals MVP
- King Mindaugas Cup
- King Mindaugas Cup MVP
- LKF Cup
