= Marek Blaževič =

Lithuanian basketball player (born 2001)

- Blaževič with the Lithuania national team

No. 22 – Žalgiris Kaunas
- Position: Center
- League: LKL; EuroLeague

Personal information
- Born: 1 September 2001 (age 25) Vilnius, Lithuania
- Listed height: 2.13 m (7 ft 0 in)
- Listed weight: 114 kg (251 lb)

Career information
- NBA draft: 2023: undrafted
- Playing career: 2017–present

Career history
- 2017–2020: Rytas
- 2017–2019: →Perlas Vilnius
- 2020–2022: Žalgiris Kaunas
- 2022–2024: Monbus Obradoiro
- 2024–2025: Wolves Twinsbet
- 2025–2026: Tofaş
- 2026–present: Žalgiris Kaunas

Career highlights
- 3× King Mindaugas Cup winner (2019, 2021, 2022); LKL champion (2021)

Marek Blaževič (born 1 September 2001) is a Lithuanian professional basketball player for Žalgiris Kaunas of the Lithuanian Basketball League (LKL) and the EuroLeague. Standing at 2.13 m (7 ft 0 in), he plays the center position.

== Professional career ==
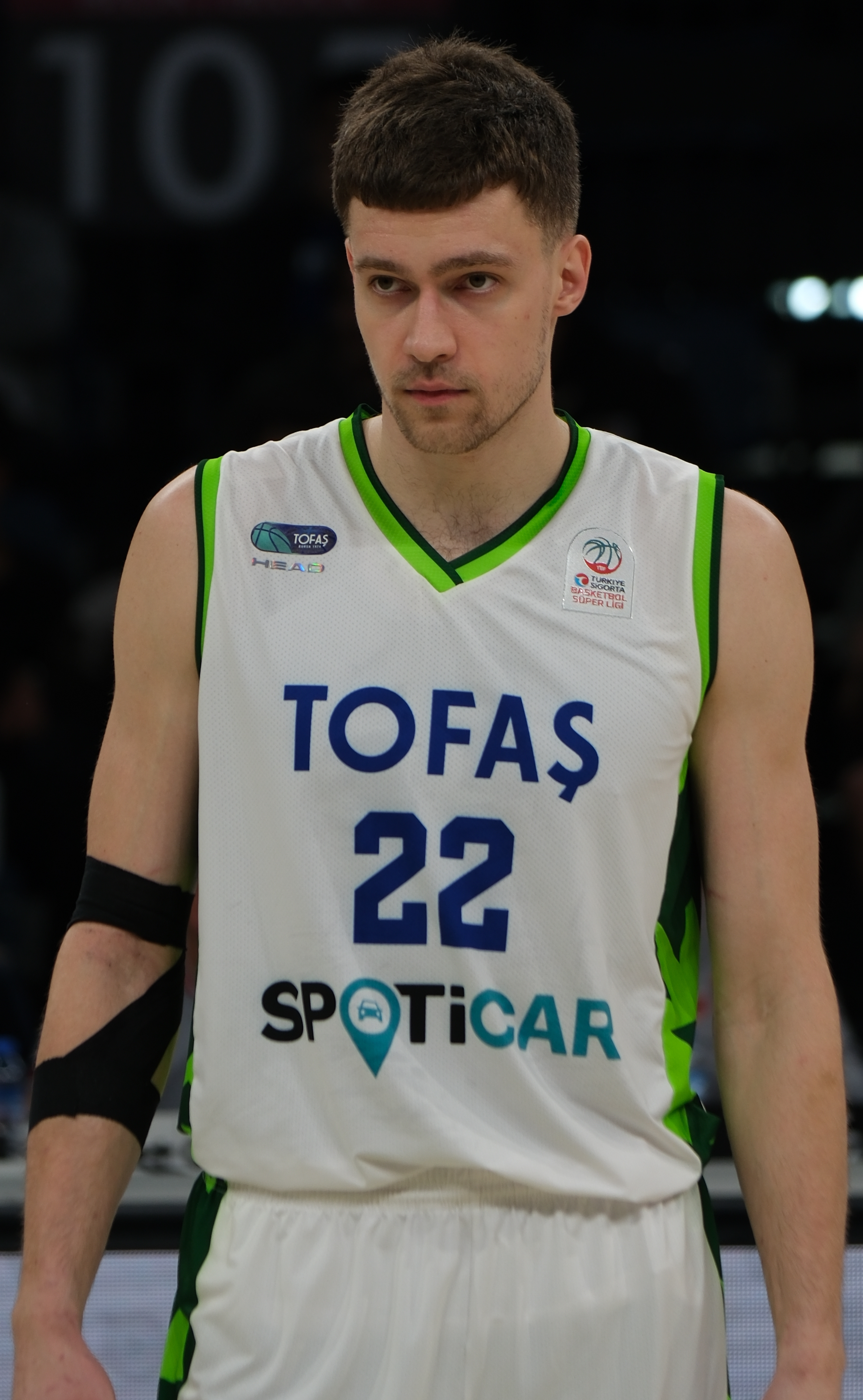
Blaževič with Tofaş in 2025

Blaževič made his professional debut with BC Perlas in the 2017–18 season.

On 6 June 2018 he signed with Rytas Vilnius. He made his LKL debut on 23 September 2018, against Juventus Utena. In his second professional game with Rytas, he scored 13 points, drawing attention of local media. Playing for the Lietuvos rytas Vilnius under-18 team, Blaževič won the 2018 EuroLeague Basketball Next Generation Tournament. He was selected to the All-Tournament Team, along with teammate Deividas Sirvydis.

On 29 June 2020, Blaževič signed a long-term contract with Žalgiris Kaunas of the Lithuanian Basketball League (LKL) and the EuroLeague. He parted ways with the club on 30 June 2022.

On 2 July 2022, he signed with Monbus Obradoiro of the Spanish Liga ACB.

On 11 July 2024, Blaževič signed a one-year deal with Wolves Twinsbet of the Lithuanian Basketball League (LKL) and the EuroCup.

On July 15, 2025, he signed with Tofaş of Basketbol Süper Ligi (BSL).

On 19 June 2026, Blaževič returned to Žalgiris Kaunas, signing a 2+1 contract through the end of the 2028–29 season.

== National team career ==
Blazevic debuted for the Lithuania Men's U-16 Basketball team in the 2017 FIBA Europe Under-16 Championship in Montenegro. Blazevic played for Lithuania Men's U-18 Basketball team in the 2018 FIBA Europe Under-18 Championship in Latvia. On November 27, 2020, Blazevic debuted as a member of the Lithuania men's national basketball team by scoring 10 points and grabbing 3 rebounds, but lost to the Denmark national basketball team result 76–80.

In 2025, Blaževič was for the first time included into the final roster of the Lithuania men's national basketball team during a major tournament – EuroBasket 2025.

== Career statistics ==
=== EuroLeague ===
Year	Team	GP	GS	MPG	FG%	3P%	FT%	RPG	APG	SPG	BPG	PPG	PIR
2020–21	Žalgiris	6	0	4.3	.400	—	.667	1.2	.3	.0	.2	2.0	1.8
2021–22	Žalgiris	27	11	11.9	.537	.000	.822	2.6	.8	.4	.1	5.7	6.3
Career		33	11	10.3	.468	.0	.804	2.3	.7	.3	.2	5.0	4.7
