= Steve Vasturia =

American basketball player

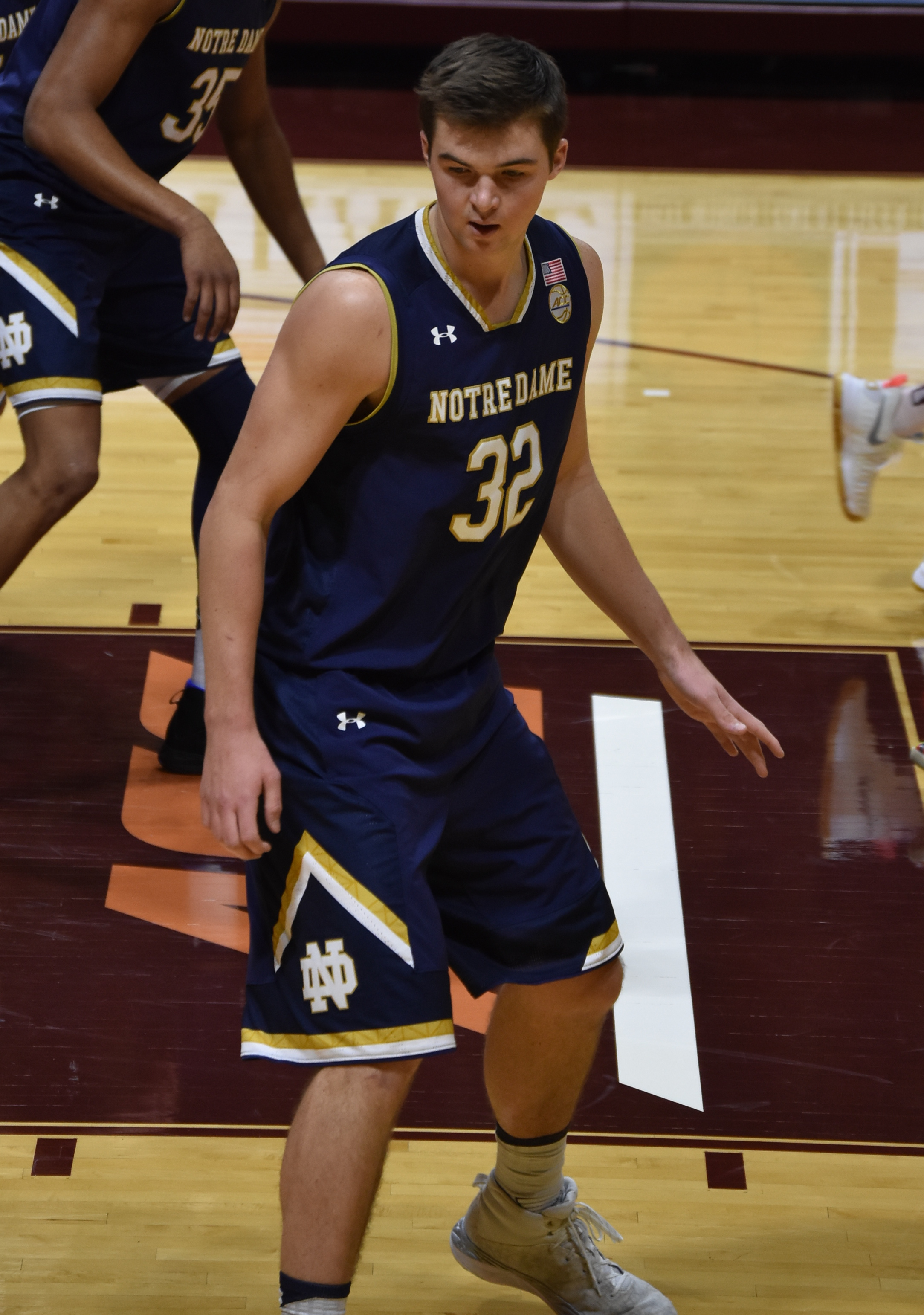
- Vasturia playing for Notre Dame

Personal information
- Born: February 10, 1995 (age 31) Philadelphia, Pennsylvania
- Listed height: 6 ft 5 in (1.96 m)
- Listed weight: 212 lb (96 kg)

Career information
- High school: St. Joseph's Prep (Philadelphia, Pennsylvania)
- College: Notre Dame (2013–2017)
- NBA draft: 2017: undrafted
- Playing career: 2018–2021
- Position: Shooting guard / small forward
- Number: 7, 32

Career history
- 2018: Alba Berlin
- 2018–2019: Palencia
- 2019–2020: Rasta Vechta
- 2020–2021: Žalgiris Kaunas

Career highlights
- Lithuanian League champion (2021); King Mindaugas Cup winner (2021); First-team Parade All-American (2013)

Stephen Paul Vasturia (born February 10, 1995) is an American former professional basketball player. He played college basketball for the University of Notre Dame.

== Early life ==
Vasturia is the son of Kathy Vasturia, who played basketball at Dickinson College and was inducted into its hall of fame in 1994. His father John played baseball and football at the University of Pennsylvania. Steve Vasturia attended St. Joseph's Prep in Philadelphia. As a junior, he led St. Joe's to a Class AAAA state title and scored 35 points in the championship, tying a record held by Wilt Chamberlain. His No. 32 jersey is retired at St. Joseph's Prep.

== College career ==
As a sophomore at Notre Dame, Vasturia averaged 10.1 points per game. He scored 15 points in a win against Wichita State in the NCAA Tournament. Vasturia averaged 11.4 points, 3.2 assists and 2.6 rebounds per game as a junior. The Fighting Irish reached the NCAA Elite Eight, but Vasturia averaged 7.2 points per game in the ACC and NCAA Tournaments. As a senior, Vasturia averaged 13.1 points, 3.9 rebounds, and 3.3 assists per game, shooting 35 percent from behind the arc.

== Professional career ==
Prior to the 2017 NBA draft, Vasturia worked out with the Philadelphia 76ers. Vasturia signed his first professional contract with Alba Berlin on January 8, 2018. On August 2, 2018, Vasturia signed with Chocolates Trapa Palencia of the LEB Oro.

On July 2, 2019, he has signed with Rasta Vechta of the Basketball Bundesliga. Vasturia averaged 13.4 points, 3.7 rebounds and 4.9 assists per game in the Bundesliga.

On June 3, 2020, Vasturia signed a two-year contract with Žalgiris Kaunas of Lithuanian Basketball League. He parted ways with the team on August 7, 2021, after averaging 6.1 points per game.

On August 9, 2021, he has signed with Beşiktaş Icrypex of the Basketbol Süper Ligi (BSL). He never played a game for Beşiktaş and left before the season.
