= Augustine Rubit =

American basketball player (born 1989)

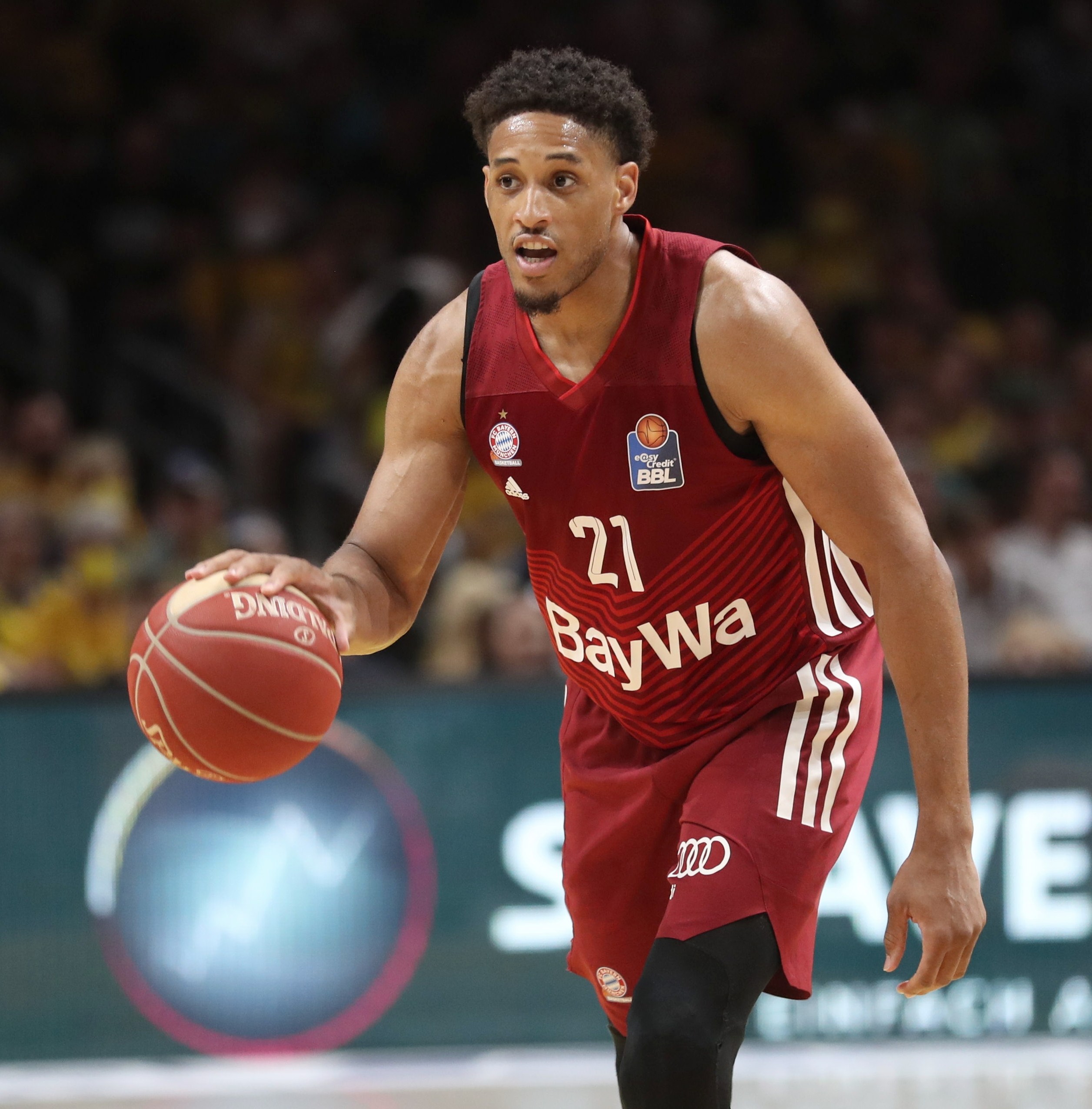
- Rubit in 2022 with Bayern Munich

No. 21 – Maccabi Ashdod
- Position: Power forward / center
- League: Israeli Basketball Premier League

Personal information
- Born: August 14, 1989 (age 37) Houston, Texas, U.S.
- Listed height: 6 ft 8 in (2.03 m)
- Listed weight: 235 lb (107 kg)

Career information
- High school: Christian Life Center Academy (Humble, Texas)
- College: South Alabama (2010–2014)
- NBA draft: 2014: undrafted
- Playing career: 2014–present

Career history
- 2014–2015: Tigers Tübingen
- 2015–2017: ratiopharm Ulm
- 2017–2019: Brose Bamberg
- 2019–2020: Olympiacos
- 2020–2021: Žalgiris Kaunas
- 2021–2023: Bayern Munich
- 2024: Rostock Seawolves
- 2024–2025: Kuwait SC
- 2025: Lietkabelis Panevėžys
- 2025–2026: Unicaja Málaga
- 2026–present: Maccabi Ashdod

Career highlights
- Kuwaiti League champion (2025); Kuwaiti Super Cup winner (2025); 2× German Cup winner (2019, 2023); LKL champion (2021); King Mindaugas Cup winner (2021); All-Bundesliga Second Team (2022); AP Honorable mention All-American (2013); Sun Belt Player of the Year (2013); 2× First-team All-Sun Belt (2012, 2013); Second-team All-Sun Belt (2014); Third-team All-Sun Belt (2011); Sun Belt Freshman of the Year (2011)

Augustine Cuero Rubit (born August 14, 1989) is an American professional basketball player for Maccabi Ashdod of the Israeli Basketball Premier League. He is a 2.03 m (6 ft 8 in) tall power forward-center.

Rubit played college basketball for the South Alabama Jaguars. With them, he was a four-time All-Sun Belt Conference selection, the 2011 Sun Belt Freshman of the Year, the 2013 Sun Belt Player of the Year, and an AP honorable mention All-American.

He began his professional career in Germany , winning the German Cup with Brose Bamberg in 2019. He subsequently competed in the EuroLeague with Olympiacos, Žalgiris Kaunas—winning the Lithuanian Basketball League and King Mindaugas Cup in 2021—and Bayern Munich, where he earned All-Basketball Bundesliga Second Team honors in 2022 and won a second German Cup in 2023. Following a 14-month recovery from surgery for an Achilles tendon injury, he played for the Rostock Seawolves, Kuwait SC (winning the 2025 Kuwaiti League and Super Cup), Lietkabelis Panevėžys, and Unicaja Málaga before joining Maccabi Ashdod in 2026.

== High school ==
Rubit, a native of Houston, Texas, played high school basketball at M.B. Smiley High School before transferring to Christian Life High School for his senior year after Smiley closed. As a senior, he averaged 22 points and 9 rebounds per game.

== College career ==
=== University of South Alabama ===
He then chose University of South Alabama for college, where he red-shirted the 2009–10 season. As a red-shirt freshman in 2010–11, Rubit started the majority of the season. He averaged 30.4 minutes, 13.1 points, 11.0 rebounds per game, and 1.1 blocks per game, while shooting 55.9% from the floor. His rebounding average was good for first in the Sun Belt Conference , sixth nationally, and led all Division I freshman. At the close of the season, Rubit was named third team All-conference and the league's freshman of the year.

In his second season, Rubit became one of the Jaguars' primary scoring options, leading the team at 15.2 points per game. He also continued his strong rebounding (9.2 per game— best in the Sun Belt) and shot blocking (0.9 per game), while shooting 50.6% from the floor, earning first team All-Sun Belt and first team NABC All-District honors.

In his junior year, Rubit became the conference's top player, averaging 19.4 points, 10.5 rebounds, 1.1 assists, and 1.2 blocks per game, while shooting 48.0% from the floor, and leading the Jaguars to the 2013 CollegeInsider.com Postseason Tournament. At the close of the season, Rubit was named Conference Player of the Year and an AP honorable mention All-American.

In his senior season, in 31 games he averaged 31.4 minutes, 17.0 points, 9.4 rebounds, 1.4 assists, and 1.5 blocks per game, shooting 46.3% from the field. He earned second-team All-Sun Belt recognition—becoming the first player in school history to earn all-conference honors in all four seasons—and finished his career as South Alabama's all-time leader in rebounds (1,183) and double-doubles (54).

== Professional career ==
=== Tigers Tübingen (2014–2015) ===
After going undrafted in the 2014 NBA draft, Rubit started his professional career by signing with Tigers Tübingen of the German Basketball Bundesliga (BBL) on July 28, 2014. In 34 BBL games for Tübingen during the 2014–15 season, Rubit averaged 28.9 minutes, 14.2 points, 7.4 rebounds, and 1.2 assists per game while shooting 54.3% from the field.

=== Ratiopharm Ulm (2015–2017) ===
On June 16, 2015, Rubit signed a two-year contract with fellow Bundesliga side ratiopharm Ulm. In his first season with Ulm (2015–16), Rubit played in 56 games across all competitions, averaging 24.5 minutes, 13.3 points, 6.0 rebounds, and 1.1 assists per game, while shooting 52.1% from the field. He helped Ulm reach the 2016 BBL Finals.

In the 2016–17 season he appeared in 49 games across all competitions, averaging 22.8 minutes, 11.6 points, 6.0 rebounds, and 1.1 assists per game, while shooting 52.5% from the floor.

=== Brose Bamberg (2017–2019) ===
On July 2, 2017, Rubit signed a three-year deal with German League champions Brose Bamberg of the EuroLeague. During the 2017–18 season, he played in 70 games across all competitions, averaging 21.9 minutes, 10.7 points, 4.4 rebounds, and 1.0 assists per game while shooting 52.5% from the field.

In the 2018–19 season, Rubit averaged 24.4 minutes, 13.9 points, 5.5 rebounds, and 1.0 assist per game while shooting 61.2% from the floor across 60 games in all competitions. He helped Bamberg capture the 2019 German Cup, grabbing a late offensive rebound in the final that led to Nikos Zisis' game-winning three-pointer in an 83–82 victory over Alba Berlin. On June 3, 2019, Rubit mutually parted ways with the team.

=== Olympiacos (2019–2020) ===
On July 8, 2019, Rubit signed a two-year contract with the Greek EuroLeague club Olympiacos. In 26 EuroLeague games during the 2019–20 season, he averaged 15.3 minutes, 6.0 points, 3.0 rebounds, and 0.6 assists per game while shooting 59.6% from the field. On June 29, 2020, Olympiacos exercised its opt-out option and parted ways with Rubit.

=== Žalgiris Kaunas (2020–2021) ===
On July 13, 2020, Rubit signed with Žalgiris Kaunas of the Lithuanian Basketball League (LKL) and the EuroLeague. Across 69 games in all competitions, he averaged 17.5 minutes, 7.6 points, 3.8 rebounds, and 0.8 assists per game on 52.8% shooting, helping Žalgiris win both the LKL championship and the King Mindaugas Cup. He parted ways with the team on July 26, 2021.

=== Bayern Munich (2021–2023) ===
Rubit in 2022

On August 24, 2021, Rubit returned to Germany by signing with Bayern Munich of the Basketball Bundesliga (BBL) and the EuroLeague. During the 2021–22 EuroLeague season, he averaged 25.4 minutes, 10.5 points, 4.9 rebounds, and 1.4 assists per game across 36 games, helping Bayern reach the EuroLeague Playoffs. In 22 BBL games that season, he averaged 12.0 points, 4.7 rebounds, and 1.5 assists per game.

On July 6, 2022, he re-signed with the team for an additional year. During the 2022–23 campaign, Rubit averaged 23.2 minutes, 10.9 points, 4.0 rebounds, and 1.4 assists per game across 20 EuroLeague games, and was named EuroLeague MVP for January 2023 (averaging 17.8 points that month, the first Bayern player ever to win the monthly award).

On February 20, 2023, Rubit was sidelined indefinitely—and subsequently ruled out for the remainder of the season—after undergoing surgery for a severe Achilles tendon injury suffered in the German Cup semifinal against Alba Berlin; Rubit missed the remainder of the 2022–23 season and nearly the entire 2023–24 season while rehabilitating, and did not return to official game action until April 2024 .

=== Rostock Seawolves (2024) ===
After returning from his Achilles injury, Rubit signed late in the 2023–24 Basketball Bundesliga season with the Rostock Seawolves in April 2024 to aid their relegation battle. He played in two league games, averaging 18.5 minutes, 8.5 points, 5.0 rebounds, and 1.5 assists per game while shooting 70.0% from the field, helping Rostock avoid relegation.

=== Kuwait SC (2024-25) ===
For the 2024–25 season, Rubit signed with Kuwait SC on August 24, 2024. He helped the club win both the Kuwaiti League and the Kuwaiti Super Cup, averaging 19.2 points and 8.8 rebounds across five domestic league games. In six FIBA WASL – Gulf League games, he averaged 25.5 minutes, 18.8 points, 8.7 rebounds, and 1.5 assists per game while shooting 54.5% from the floor.

=== Lietkabelis Panevėžys (2025) ===
On August 11, 2025, Rubit signed with Lietkabelis Panevėžys of the Lithuanian Basketball League (LKL) and the EuroCup. He signed a short-term deal as an injury replacement for Fardaws Aimaq and averaged 24.4 minutes, 14.0 points, 6.2 rebounds, and 2.6 assists across 10 LKL games, along with 15.1 points, 4.8 rebounds, and 1.5 assists across eight EuroCup games.

=== Unicaja Malaga (2025-2026) ===
On November 24, 2025, Rubit signed with Unicaja Málaga of the Spanish Liga ACB and the Basketball Champions League. During the remainder of the 2025–26 season with Unicaja, he averaged 6.4 points and 2.1 rebounds across 21 Liga ACB games, and 7.1 points and 2.0 rebounds across nine Basketball Champions League games.

=== Maccabi Ashdod (2026-present) ===
In August 2026, Rubit signed with Maccabi Ashdod ahead of the club's return to the top-tier Israeli Basketball Premier League for the 2026–27 season.

== Career statistics ==
Legend
GP	Games played	GS	Games started	MPG	Minutes per game
FG%	Field-goal percentage	3P%	3-point field-goal percentage	FT%	Free-throw percentage
RPG	Rebounds per game	APG	Assists per game	SPG	Steals per game
BPG	Blocks per game	PPG	Points per game	PIR	Performance index rating
**Bold**	Career high

=== EuroLeague ===
Year	Team	GP	GS	MPG	FG%	3P%	FT%	RPG	APG	SPG	BPG	PPG	PIR
2017–18	Brose Bamberg	30	17	21.6	.527	.368	.794	4.7	.9	.7	.3	10.1	12.1
2019–20	Olympiacos	26	4	15.2	**.596**	**.500**	.822	3.0	.6	.4	**.4**	6.0	7.3
2020–21	Žalgiris	31	1	19.1	.505	.267	.829	4.2	.7	.6	.3	8.1	9.4
2021–22	Bayern	**36**	**34**	**25.4**	.484	.356	**.867**	**4.9**	**1.4**	.6	.3	10.5	12.8
2022–23	Bayern	20	15	23.2	.515	.300	.809	4.0	**1.4**	**.8**	.2	**10.9**	**13.8**
Career		143	71	21.1	.515	.357	.825	4.2	1.0	.6	.3	9.2	11.1

=== EuroCup ===
Year	Team	GP	GS	MPG	FG%	3P%	FT%	RPG	APG	SPG	BPG	PPG	PIR
2015–16	Ratiopharm Ulm	**16**	**15**	**25.2**	**.547**	.438	**.884**	5.2	1.1	.5	**.8**	12.2	14.2
2016–17	Ratiopharm Ulm	12	3	20.3	.488	.250	.813	**5.8**	1.3	.6	.3	10.3	13.8
2025–26	Lietkabelis Panevėžys	8	8	24.2	.529	**.500**	.846	4.8	**1.5**	**1.0**	.0	**15.1**	**18.6**
Career		36	26	23.4	.526	.400	.846	5.3	1.2	.6	.4	12.2	15.1
