= 2020–21 LKL season =

28th season of the top-tier level professional basketball league of Lithuania

Betsafe-LKL
- Season: 2020–21
- Duration: 18 September 2020 – 10 May 2021 (Regular season); 12 May 2021 – 9 June 2021 (Play-offs)
- Games played: 180 (Regular season)
- Teams: 10

Regular season
- Season MVP: (Iceland) Elvar Már Friðriksson

Finals
- Champions: Žalgiris (23rd title)
- Runners-up: Rytas
- Third place: Lietkabelis
- Fourth place: Juventus
- Finals MVP: (United States) Thomas Walkup

Statistical leaders
| Points | (Lithuania) Vaidas Kariniauskas | 16.61 |
| Rebounds | (Lithuania) Julius Kazakauskas | 9.28 |
| Assists | (Iceland) Elvar Már Friðriksson | 7.53 |
| Index Rating | (Iceland) Elvar Már Friðriksson | 19.44 |

Records
- Biggest home win: Žalgiris 92–45 Rytas (06 December 2020)
- Biggest away win: Nevėžis–OPTIBET 53–108 Žalgiris (06 February 2021)
- Highest scoring: Juventus 80–116 Žalgiris (27 May 2021)
- Winning streak: 20 games Žalgiris
- Losing streak: 9 games Nevėžis-OPTIBET; Pieno žvaigždės

Seasons
- ← 2019–20 2021–22 →
- All statistics correct as of 11 July 2021.

The 2020–21 Lietuvos krepšinio lyga, also called Betsafe-LKL for sponsorship reasons, was the 28th season of the top-tier level professional basketball league of Lithuania, the Lietuvos krepšinio lyga (LKL). Žalgiris achieved their 23rd title overall, eleven consecutive.

== Competition format ==
During the regular season, all teams play 36 games. The top eight teams in the regular season standings, after playing their entire 36 game schedule, qualified for the playoffs in the quarterfinals, that was played in a best-of-three games format. The semifinals were played in best-of-three format.

The final round was played between the two winners of the semifinals. The finals series, for first place, as also games for third place were played in a best-of-five format.

== Notable events ==
- On 30 September 2020, the LKL has reached a historic agreement - LKL will be broadcast in foreign countries for the first time since its establishment.
- On 9 October 2020, the LKL decided that the match between Žalgiris and Nevėžis-Optibet on 11 October 2020 and the match between Juventus and Alytus Dzūkija on 10 October 2020 are postponed.
- On 27 October 2020, the LKL Board has decided how to deal with the spread of COVID-19 infection and how the LKL championship matches will take place. The minimum number of players in a team in order to play a match is 8 players, if there is no such number of players in the team, the match will be suspended and postponed to the next date.
- On 27 April 2021, the LKL board decided that 11 teams will participate in the tournament for the next 2021-22 LKL season. Next season, a team from NKL Cbet Jonava, which won the NKL title this year, will join LKL. The team that will take last place this season will not relegate to NKL.
- On 7 June 2021, the last match of the Betsafe-LKL final series took place. Žalgiris won the Betsafe-LKL title, it is already the 23rd Žalgiris title and the 11th consecutive title.

== Teams ==
=== Location and arenas ===
Location of teams in 2020-21 LKL

Ten teams were granted licences for the 2020–21 LKL season.

| Team | Location | Arena | Capacity |
|---|---|---|---|
| Cbet Prienai | Prienai | Prienai Arena | 1,500 |
| Dzūkija | Alytus | Alytus Arena | 5,500 |
| Juventus | Utena | Utena Arena | 2,000 |
| Lietkabelis | Panevėžys | Cido Arena | 5,950 |
| Neptūnas | Klaipėda | Švyturys Arena | 6,200 |
| Nevėžis-OPTIBET | Kėdainiai | Kėdainiai Arena | 2,200 |
| Pieno žvaigždės | Pasvalys | Pieno žvaigždės Arena | 1,500 |
| Rytas | Vilnius | Jeep Arena | 2,500 |
| Rytas | Vilnius | Avia Solutions Group Arena | 10,000 |
| Šiauliai | Šiauliai | Šiauliai Arena | 5,700 |
| Žalgiris | Kaunas | Žalgiris Arena | 15,708 |

=== Managerial changes ===
| Team | Outgoing manager | Manner of departure | Date of vacancy | Position in table | Replaced with | Date of appointment |
|---|---|---|---|---|---|---|
| Nevėžis-OPTIBET | (Lithuania) Marius Kiltinavičius | Mutual consent | 29 November 2020 | 6th (5–5) | (United States) David Gale | 7 December 2020 |
| Rytas | (Lithuania) Donaldas Kairys | Sacked | 16 January 2021 | 3rd (9–5) | (Lithuania) Giedrius Žibėnas | 1 February 2021 |

== Regular season ==
=== League table ===
| Pos | Team | Pld | W | L | PF | PA | PD | Qualification or relegation |
|---|---|---|---|---|---|---|---|---|
| 1 | Žalgiris | 36 | 33 | 3 | 3277 | 2569 | +708 | Advance to playoffs |
| 2 | Rytas | 36 | 27 | 9 | 3185 | 2858 | +327 | Advance to playoffs |
| 3 | Lietkabelis | 36 | 23 | 13 | 3052 | 2883 | +169 | Advance to playoffs |
| 4 | Juventus | 36 | 23 | 13 | 3202 | 3102 | +100 | Advance to playoffs |
| 5 | Cbet Prienai | 36 | 14 | 22 | 3020 | 3210 | −190 | Advance to playoffs |
| 6 | Neptūnas | 36 | 14 | 22 | 2841 | 3061 | −220 | Advance to playoffs |
| 7 | Šiauliai | 36 | 13 | 23 | 3066 | 3290 | −224 | Advance to playoffs |
| 8 | Pieno žvaigždės | 36 | 12 | 24 | 2864 | 3043 | −179 | Advance to playoffs |
| 9 | Dzūkija | 36 | 11 | 25 | 2909 | 3067 | −158 | |
| 10 | Nevėžis-OPTIBET | 36 | 10 | 26 | 2735 | 3068 | −333 | |

Source: LKL.LT

=== Results ===
| Home \ Away | CBE | DZU | JUV | LTK | NEP | NEV | PIE | RYT | SIA | ZAL | CBE | DZU | JUV | LTK | NEP | NEV | PIE | RYT | SIA | ZAL |
|---|---|---|---|---|---|---|---|---|---|---|---|---|---|---|---|---|---|---|---|---|
| Cbet Prienai | — | 81–74 | 91–105 | 93–78 | 99–67 | 87–85 | 96–99 | 80–90 | 94–87 | 72–96 | — | 88–82 | 94–108 | 70–92 | 72–66 | 97–70 | 71–76 | 67–97 | 90–89 | 81–101 |
| Dzūkija | 91–77 | — | 82–97 | 86–70 | 63–71 | 80–74 | 76–84 | 80–90 | 87–81 | 62–95 | 82–86 | — | 76–92 | 90–96 | 77–86 | 87–76 | 96–85 | 86–95 | 88–98 | 78–95 |
| Juventus | 89–84 | 106–98 | — | 76–78 | 85–84 | 83–76 | 89–75 | 79–100 | 96–82 | 90–87 | 94–91 | 97–86 | — | 78–88 | 98–58 | 92–73 | 85–83 | 82–88 | 86–90 | 78–102 |
| Lietkabelis | 84–87 | 93–85 | 100–79 | — | 87–82 | 98–69 | 84–60 | 78–59 | 101–76 | 77–82 | 87–79 | 100–80 | 98–86 | — | 82–77 | 88–95 | 98–90 | 85–79 | 108–105 | 88–94 |
| Neptūnas | 92–69 | 84–81 | 88–97 | 80–90 | — | 76–70 | 80–74 | 60–98 | 88–94 | 74–104 | 92–81 | 81–64 | 89–91 | 83–73 | — | 84–83 | 99–93 | 59–90 | 107–106 | 72–88 |
| Nevėžis | 92–88 | 78–82 | 70–87 | 76–70 | 79–76 | — | 58–81 | 100–94 | 96–77 | 47–78 | 71–84 | 57–71 | 81–99 | 76–67 | 88–77 | — | 64–89 | 91–82 | 87–88 | 53–108 |
| Pieno žvaigždės | 104–89 | 79–68 | 69–79 | 63–82 | 73–77 | 72–82 | — | 82–79 | 87–64 | 67–81 | 79–85 | 79–86 | 80–95 | 77–80 | 72–86 | 84–71 | — | 75–84 | 70–88 | 63–93 |
| Rytas | 105–81 | 80–74 | 106–77 | 78–72 | 95–83 | 96–91 | 106–82 | — | 107–80 | 72–84 | 99–63 | 92–79 | 88–86 | 81–67 | 97–76 | 81–73 | 87–88 | — | 104–68 | 81–90 |
| Šiauliai | 95–86 | 71–102 | 92–87 | 84–86 | 80–74 | 87–85 | 80–81 | 78–86 | — | 74–88 | 99–105 | 75–82 | 94–112 | 97–87 | 99–68 | 85–73 | 103–90 | 85–98 | — | 86–105 |
| Žalgiris | 103–100 | 86–80 | 84–63 | 61–72 | 81–59 | 94–59 | 95–76 | 92–45 | 89–56 | — | 90–62 | 92–68 | 97–79 | 70–68 | 85–72 | 99–66 | 107–83 | 85–86 | 96–60 | — |

Source: LKL.LT
Legend: Blue = home team win; Red = away team win.
Matches with lighter background shading were decided after overtime.

== Play–offs ==
Quarterfinals will be played in a best–of–three games format, while semifinals and the finals in a best–of–five format.

=== Bracket ===
Quarterfinals
Žalgiris | 2
Pieno žvaigždės | 0
Juventus | 2
Cbet Prienai | 0
Rytas | 2
Šiauliai | 0
Lietkabelis | 2
Neptūnas | 0

Semifinals
Žalgiris | 3
Juventus | 0
Rytas | 3
Lietkabelis | 0

Finals
Žalgiris | 3
Rytas | 0
Third place
Lietkabelis | 3
Juventus | 2

== Lithuanian clubs in European competitions ==
| Team | Competition | Progress |
|---|---|---|
| Žalgiris | EuroLeague | 11th |
| Lietkabelis | EuroCup | Regular season |
| Rytas | Champions League | Regular season |

== Awards ==
All official awards of the 2020–21 LKL season.

=== Regular Season MVP ===
| Pos. | Player | Team | Source |
|---|---|---|---|
| PG | (Iceland) Elvar Már Friðriksson | Šiauliai | |

=== LKL Finals MVP ===
| Pos. | Player | Team | Source |
|---|---|---|---|
| PG | (United States) Thomas Walkup | Žalgiris | |

=== Other awards ===
| Award | Player | Team | Source |
|---|---|---|---|
| Gentleman of the year | (Lithuania) Arnas Butkevičius | Rytas | |
| Breakthrough of the year | (Lithuania) Margiris Normantas | Lietkabelis | |
| The best defensive player | (United States) Thomas Walkup | Žalgiris | |
| The best young player | (Lithuania) Rokas Jokubaitis | Žalgiris | |

=== Best coach of the season ===
| Coach | Team | Source |
|---|---|---|
| (Lithuania) Mantas Šernius | Cbet Prienai | |

=== All-LKL Teams ===
First Team
| (Iceland) Elvar Már Friðriksson | Šiauliai |
| (Lithuania) Vaidas Kariniauskas | Juventus |
| (Lithuania) Mindaugas Sušinskas | Cbet Prienai |
| (Lithuania) Gytis Masiulis | Lietkabelis |
| (France) Joffrey Lauvergne | Žalgiris |

=== Player of the month ===
| Month | Player | Team | PIR | Source |
2020
| September | (United States) Demetrius Jackson | Rytas | 22 | |
| October | (Lithuania) Regimantas Miniotas | Cbet Prienai | 30.5 | |
| November | (Iceland) Elvar Már Friðriksson | Šiauliai | 27 | |
| December | (Lithuania) Edgaras Želionis | Pieno žvaigždės | 26 | |
2021
| January | (Lithuania) Žygimantas Skučas | Juventus | 22.7 | |
| February | (Lithuania) Vaidas Kariniauskas | Juventus | 26.5 | |
| March | (Lithuania) Tomas Lekūnas | Pieno žvaigždės | 23.2 | |
| April | (Lithuania) Mindaugas Kupšas | Juventus | 25.6 | |

== Statistics ==
=== Individual statistics ===
==== Rating ====
| Rank | Name | Team | Games | Rating | PIR |
|---|---|---|---|---|---|
| 1. | (Iceland) Elvar Már Friðriksson | Šiauliai | 36 | 700 | 19.44 |
| 2. | (Lithuania) Julius Kazakauskas | Nevėžis-OPTIBET | 32 | 592 | 18.50 |
| 3. | (Lithuania) Mindaugas Kupšas | Juventus | 46 | 841 | 18.28 |

Source: LKL.LT

==== Points ====
| Rank | Name | Team | Games | Points | PPG |
|---|---|---|---|---|---|
| 1. | (Lithuania) Vaidas Kariniauskas | Juventus | 28 | 465 | 16.61 |
| 2. | (Puerto Rico) Kyle Vinales | Lietkabelis | 36 | 578 | 16.06 |
| 3. | (United States) Sedrick Barefield | Nevėžis-OPTIBET | 28 | 434 | 15.50 |

Source: LKL.LT

==== Rebounds ====
| Rank | Name | Team | Games | Rebounds | RPG |
|---|---|---|---|---|---|
| 1. | (Lithuania) Julius Kazakauskas | Nevėžis-OPTIBET | 32 | 297 | 9.28 |
| 2. | (Lithuania) Giedrius Staniulis | Dzūkija | 25 | 191 | 7.64 |
| 3. | (Germany) Ariel Hukporti | Nevėžis–OPTIBET | 21 | 155 | 7.38 |

Source: LKL.LT

==== Assists ====
| Rank | Name | Team | Games | Assists | APG |
|---|---|---|---|---|---|
| 1. | (Iceland) Elvar Már Friðriksson | Šiauliai | 36 | 271 | 7.63 |
| 2. | (Lithuania) Žygimantas Janavičius | Neptūnas | 31 | 202 | 6.52 |
| 3. | (Lithuania) Vaidas Kariniauskas | Juventus | 28 | 173 | 6.18 |

Source: LKL.LT

==== Other statistics ====
| Category | Player | Team | Games | Average |
|---|---|---|---|---|
| Steals | (Lithuania) Margiris Normantas | Lietkabelis | 37 | 1.86 |
| Blocks | (Germany) Ariel Hukporti | Nevėžis–OPTIBET | 21 | 1.24 |
| Turnovers | (Lithuania) Vaidas Kariniauskas | Juventus | 28 | 3.82 |
| Fouls drawn | (Iceland) Elvar Már Friðriksson | Šiauliai | 36 | 5.11 |
| Minutes | (Lithuania) Mindaugas Sušinskas | Cbet Prienai | 36 | 32:21 |
| FT % | (United States) Andrew Goudelock | Rytas | 36 | 92.73% |
| 2-Point % | (Latvia) Kaspars Bērziņš | Šiauliai | 23 | 73.40% |
| 3-Point % | (Lithuania) Gytis Radzevičius | Rytas | 43 | 51.69% |

Source: LKL.LT

=== Individual game highs ===
| Category | Player | Team | Statistic | Opponent |
|---|---|---|---|---|
| Rating | (Iceland) Elvar Már Friðriksson | Šiauliai | 51 | Pieno žvaigždės (Apr 21, 2021) |
| Points | (Iceland) Elvar Már Friðriksson | Šiauliai | 33 | Pieno žvaigždės (Apr 21, 2021) |
| Rebounds | (Lithuania) Julius Kazakauskas | Nevėžis-OPTIBET | 18 | Rytas (May 8, 2021) |
| Assists | (Iceland) Elvar Már Friðriksson | Šiauliai | 17 | Neptūnas (May 7, 2021) |
| Steals | (Lithuania) Margiris Normantas | Lietkabelis | 7 | Juventus (Jan 13, 2021) |
| Blocks | (Germany) Ariel Hukporti | Nevėžis-OPTIBET | 4 | Rytas (May 8, 2021) |

Source: LKL.LT

=== Team statistics ===
| Category | Team | Average |
|---|---|---|
| Rating | Žalgiris | 112.89 |
| Points | Žalgiris | 91.66 |
| Rebounds | Nevėžis-OPTIBET | 37.22 |
| Assists | Žalgiris | 23.23 |
| Steals | Lietkabelis | 8.43 |
| Blocks | Juventus | 3.22 |
| Turnovers | Nevėžis-OPTIBET | 17.00 |
| FT % | Žalgiris | 81.09% |
| 2-Point % | Juventus | 60.89% |
| 3-Point % | Žalgiris | 42.27% |

Source: LKL.LT
