= 2019–20 LKL season =

Betsafe-LKL
- Season: 2019–20
- Teams: 10

Regular season
- Basketball Champions League: Rytas

Finals
- Champions: Žalgiris; 22nd title
- Runners-up: Rytas
- Third place: Lietkabelis
- Fourth place: Neptūnas

The 2019–20 Lietuvos krepšinio lyga, also called Betsafe-LKL for sponsorship reasons, was the 27th season of the top-tier level professional basketball league of Lithuania, the Lietuvos krepšinio lyga (LKL). On 13 March 2020, season was ended prematurely because of the coronavirus pandemic.

== Coronavirus pandemic ==
On 13 March 2020, the board of the LKL decided to end the season because of the coronavirus pandemic. Along with this decision, they crowned regular season champions Žalgiris as the new Lithuanian champions.

== Competition format ==
During the regular season, all teams play 32 games. The top eight teams in the regular season standings, after playing their entire 32 game schedule, qualified for the playoffs in the quarterfinals, that was played in a best-of-three games format. The semifinals were played in best-of-three format.

The final round was played between the two winners of the semifinals. The finals series, for first place, as also games for third place were played in a best-of-five format.

== Teams ==
=== Location and arenas ===
Location of teams in 2019–20 LKL

At first, nine teams were able to participate because Nevėžis did not provide the required documentation up to 15 August. However, board of the LKL approved participation of that team.

Team	Location	Arena	Capacity
Cbet Prienai	Prienai	Prienai Arena	1,500
Sintek–Dzūkija	Alytus	Alytus Arena	5,500
Juventus	Utena	Utena Arena	2,000
Lietkabelis	Panevėžys	Cido Arena	5,950
Neptūnas	Klaipėda	Švyturys Arena	6,200
Nevėžis	Kėdainiai	Kėdainiai Arena	2,200
Pieno žvaigždės	Pasvalys	Pieno žvaigždės Arena	1,500
Rytas	Vilnius	Lietuvos rytas Arena	2,500
Rytas	Vilnius	Siemens Arena	10,000
Šiauliai	Šiauliai	Šiauliai Arena	5,700
Žalgiris	Kaunas	Žalgiris Arena	15,708

== Regular season ==
=== League table ===
Pos	Team	Pld	W	L	PF	PA	PD	Qualification or relegation
1	Žalgiris (C)	24	22	2	2135	1680	+455	Already qualified for EuroLeague
2	Rytas	24	17	7	2033	1812	+221	Qualification for Champions League
3	Lietkabelis	24	16	8	1880	1740	+140	Qualification for EuroCup
4	Neptūnas	24	14	10	2009	1933	+76	Qualification for Champions League qualifying rounds
5	Juventus	24	13	11	1847	1877	−30	
6	Cbet Prienai	24	11	13	1769	1906	−137	
7	Pieno žvaigždės	24	8	16	1861	1993	−132	
8	Šiauliai	24	7	17	1892	2045	−153	
9	Sintek–Dzūkija	24	6	18	1785	1989	−204	
10	Nevėžis (Note: The rule enforcing relegation of the last placed team was suspended as a result of an early termination of the championship.)	24	6	18	1626	1862	−236	

Source: LKL
(C) Champions

=== Results ===
Home \ Away	CBE	DZU	JUV	LTK	NEP	NEV	PIE	RYT	SIA	ZAL	CBE	DZU	JUV	LTK	NEP	NEV	PIE	RYT	SIA	ZAL
Cbet Prienai	—	88–72	74–80	80–74	59–101	79–77	81–79	78–87	85–76	64–105	—	94–70			85–95		67–65			79–94
Sintek–Dzūkija	61–68	—	84–77	54–63	80–77	68–62	74–75	54–92	87–61	65–91		—		65–73		86–87				
Juventus	65–76	88–75	—	77–83	80–76	92–84	112–108	83–81	77–72	77–101		84–71	—	89–77				66–70		82–91
Lietkabelis	74–61	91–73	84–62	—	102–64	75–51	75–62	83–74	88–70	83–72	76–62			—		85–69	67–81			
Neptūnas	86–73	74–67	80–67	78–74	—	88–78	93–70	91–84	90–94	73–80		78–73	115–89	78–84	—				90–70	
Nevėžis	73–70	70–74	78–80	91–68	75–68	—	88–87	68–65	85–98	57–83			77–82			—				63–92
Pieno žvaigždės	63–71	79–75	72–84	78–75	77–86	87–66	—	72–93	88–84	64–108		96–74					—		80–73	74–77
Rytas	88–64	98–85	86–65	82–77	85–75	90–71	95–84	—	93–70	70–88					92–69	96–75	97–89	—	96–75	
Šiauliai	84–69	71–73	60–86	71–80	95–102	96–81	81–86	81–86	—	63–94	74–87					91–75			—	
Žalgiris	87–55	102–50	86–80	96–69	100–82	89–84	81–47	78–72	86–80	—								71–61	83–86	—

Updated to match(es) played on 10 March 2020. Source: LKL.LT
Legend: Blue = home team win; Red = away team win.

== Awards ==
=== Player of the month ===
Month	Player	Team	PIR	Source
2019
September	(Lithuania) Evaldas Kairys	Rytas	20	
October	(Lithuania) Rokas Gustys	Šiauliai	23	
November	(Lithuania) Martinas Geben	Žalgiris	18	
December	(United States) Chauncey Collins	Sintek–Dzūkija	26.5	
2020
January	(Croatia) Željko Šakić	Lietkabelis	23.4	
February	(Lithuania) Laurynas Birutis	CBet Prienai	31	
March	Not given because season was canceled due to coronavirus pandemic			
April	Not given because season was canceled due to coronavirus pandemic			

=== Other awards ===
Award	Player	Team	Source
Gentleman of the year	(Lithuania) Arnas Butkevičius	Prienai	
The best defensive player	(United States) Thomas Walkup	Žalgiris	
The best young player	(Lithuania) Rokas Jokubaitis	Prienai	

=== Best coach of the season ===
Coach	Team	Source
(Lithuania) Šarūnas Jasikevičius	Zalgiris	

=== All-LKL Team ===
Pos.	Player	Team	Source
PG	(United States) Thomas Walkup	Žalgiris	
SG	(Lithuania) Arnas Velička	Prienai	
SF	(Lithuania) Arnas Butkevičius	Rytas	
PF	(United States) Zach LeDay	Žalgiris	
C	(Lithuania) Laurynas Birutis	Prienai	

== Lithuanian clubs in European competitions ==
Team	Competition	Progress
Žalgiris	EuroLeague	Regular season
Rytas	EuroCup	Top 16
Neptūnas	Champions League	Regular season
Lietkabelis	Champions League	Round of 16
