= Martinas Geben =

Lithuanian basketball player (born 1994)

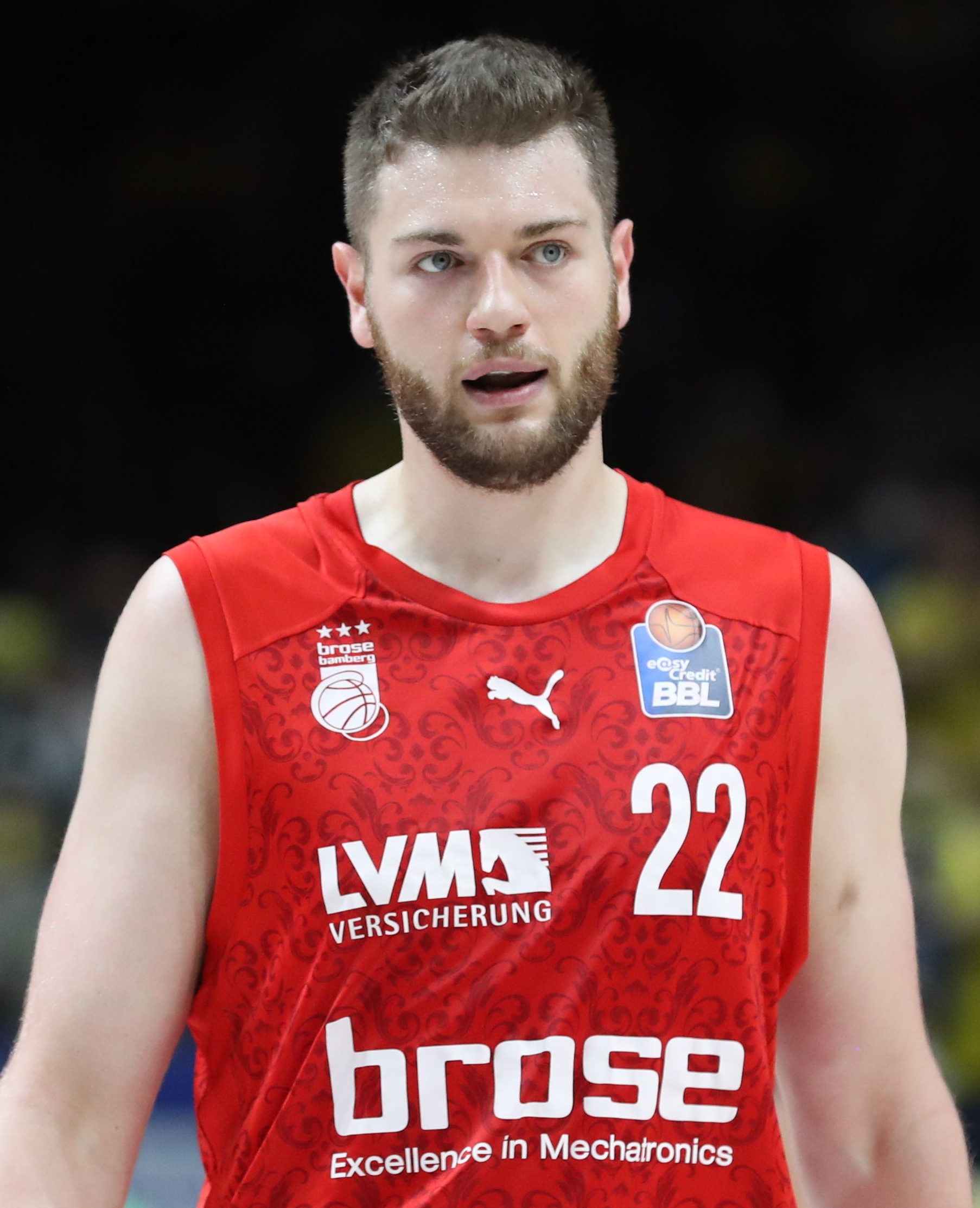
- Geben with Brose Bamberg in 2022

No. 12 – Bàsquet Girona
- Position: Center
- League: Liga ACB

Personal information
- Born: October 20, 1994 (age 32) Vilnius, Lithuania
- Listed height: 2.08 m (6 ft 10 in)
- Listed weight: 112 kg (247 lb)

Career information
- College: Notre Dame (2014–2018)
- NBA draft: 2018: undrafted
- Playing career: 2018–present

Career history
- 2018–2021: Žalgiris Kaunas
- 2018–2019: →Juventus Utena
- 2021–2022: Brose Bamberg
- 2022: Fraport Skyliners
- 2022–2024: Bàsquet Manresa
- 2024–2025: Cedevita Olimpija
- 2024–2025: →Bàsquet Girona
- 2025–present: Bàsquet Girona

Career highlights
- LKL champion (2020, 2021); 2× King Mindaugas Cup winner (2020, 2021); Lithuanian LKL MVP (2019); LKL rebounding leader (2019); LKL blocks leader (2019)
Medals
Men's basketball
Representing Lithuania
FIBA World U-19 Cup
Bronze medal – third place	2013 Czech Republic	Team
2017 Summer Universiade
Gold medal – first place	2017 Taipei	Team

Martinas Geben (born October 20, 1994) is a Lithuanian professional basketball player for Bàsquet Girona of the Liga ACB. He previously attended and played college basketball in the University of Notre Dame.

== College career ==
Geben played four seasons at the University of Notre Dame. He was primarily used as a backup in his first two seasons for the Fighting Irish, and became a starter in his senior year. As a senior, he averaged 11.1 points and 8.0 rebounds per game.

== Professional career ==
On 28 June 2018, Geben signed a three-year (2+1) contract with the Lithuanian champions Žalgiris Kaunas.

On 11 September 2018, Geben was loaned to the Juventus Utena of the Lithuanian Basketball League. After averaging 11.5 points, 7.4 rebounds and 1.2 blocks during the 2018–19 LKL season, he received the LKL Most Valuable Player Award.

On 29 July 2021, Geben signed with Brose Bamberg of the Basketball Bundesliga (BBL).

On 20 September 2022, Geben signed a two-month deal with Skyliners Frankfurt of the Basketball Bundesliga. He averaged 14.3 points, 7.0 rebounds and 3.2 assists in six BBL games played.

On 11 December 2022, Geben signed with Baxi Manresa of the Liga ACB for the rest of the 2022–23 season. On 27 June 2023, he renewed his contract for an additional year.

On 21 June 2024, Geben signed a two-year contract with Cedevita Olimpija of the ABA League and the Slovenian League.

In December 2024, Geben was loaned to Bàsquet Girona until the end of the season, returning to the Liga ACB after his previous stint at Bàsquet Manresa.

== National team career ==
Geben won bronze medal while representing the Lithuania men's national under-19 basketball team during the 2013 FIBA Under-19 World Championship. Geben won a gold medal at the 2017 Summer Universiade in Taipei as part of the Lithuanian student national team with an 85–74 win over the United States.

== Career statistics ==
Legend
GP	Games played	GS	Games started	MPG	Minutes per game
FG%	Field goal percentage	3P%	3-point field goal percentage	FT%	Free throw percentage
RPG	Rebounds per game	APG	Assists per game	SPG	Steals per game
BPG	Blocks per game	PPG	Points per game	**Bold**	Career high

=== College ===
Year	Team	GP	GS	MPG	FG%	3P%	FT%	RPG	APG	SPG	BPG	PPG
2014–15	Notre Dame	22	1	8.8	.550	—	.700	1.6	.4	.0	.4	1.6
2015–16	Notre Dame	16	0	3.0	.545	—	1.000	.9	.0	.1	.1	1.4
2016–17	Notre Dame	34	23	12.4	.646	—	.767	3.4	.7	.4	.3	3.1
2017–18	Notre Dame	36	36	24.8	.606	.333	.850	8.0	1.2	.6	.9	11.1
Career		108	60	14.4	.608	.333	.825	4.2	.7	.3	.5	5.2
