= Norbertas Giga =

Lithuanian basketball player (born 1995)

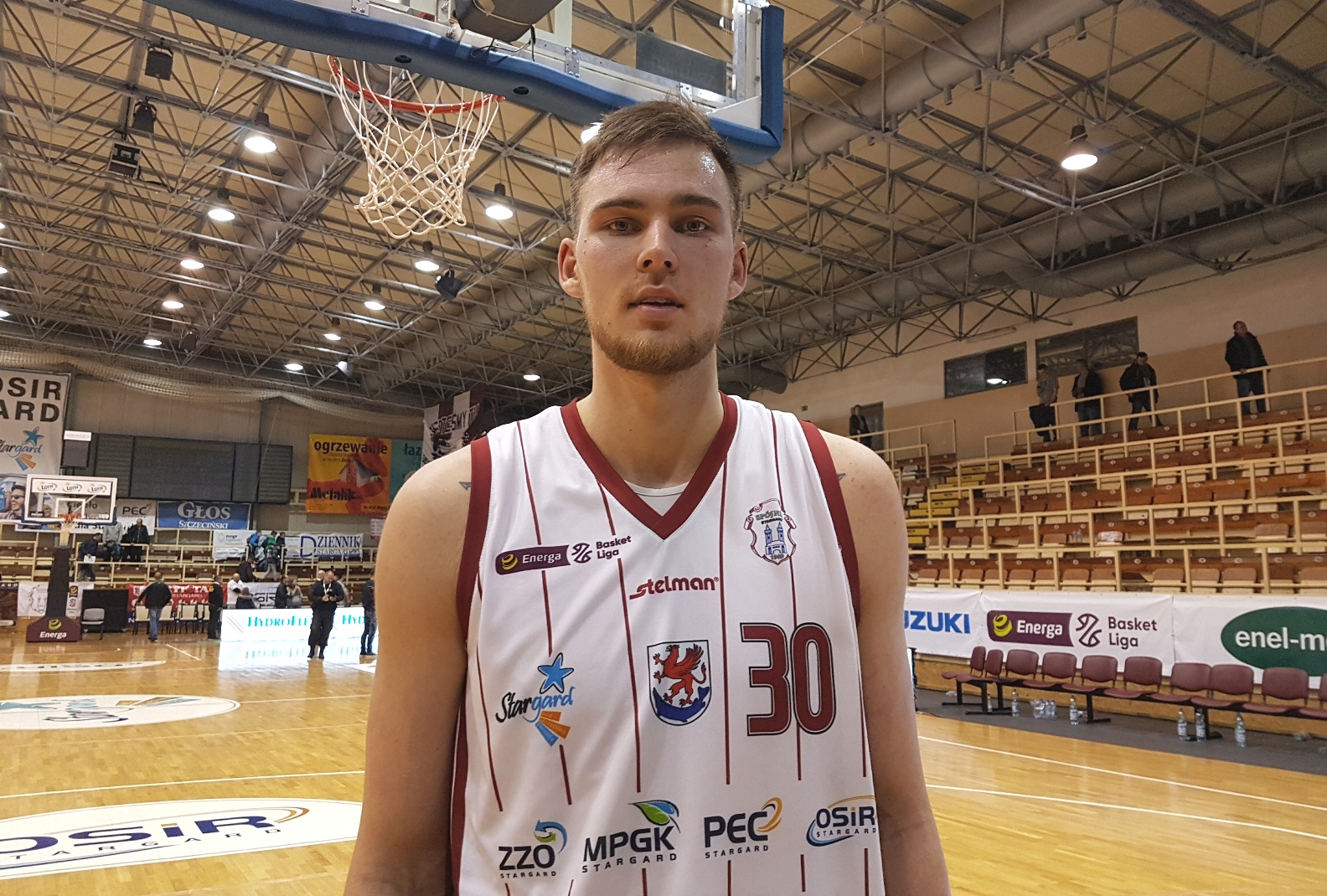

BC Šilutė
- Position: Center / power forward
- League: National Basketball League

Personal information
- Born: June 6, 1995 (age 31) Kėdainiai, Lithuania
- Listed height: 6 ft 10 in (2.08 m)
- Listed weight: 228 lb (103 kg)

Career information
- High school: Saint Benedict's Prep (Newark, New Jersey)
- College: Tallahassee CC (2014–2015); Midland (2015–2016); Jacksonville State (2016–2018)
- NBA draft: 2018: undrafted
- Playing career: 2012–present

Career history
- 2018–2019: Rytas Vilnius
- 2018–2019: →Spójnia Stargard
- 2019–2020: Juventus Utena
- 2020–2021: Neptūnas Klaipėda
- 2021–2022: Juventus Utena
- 2022–2023: Haukar
- 2023–2024: Irbis-Alatau
- 2024: Álftanes
- 2024: Kanazawa Samuraiz
- 2024–2025: Prawira Bandung
- 2025-present: BC Šilutė

Career highlights
- All-IBL Defensive Team (2025)

Norbertas Giga (born June 6, 1995) is a Lithuanian professional basketball player. He played college basketball for Jacksonville State University and graduated in 2018.

== Professional career ==
During his early career, Giga represented KM-Perlas Vilnius in RKL.

Giga represented the Philadelphia 76ers during the 2018 NBA Summer League. His debut was 4 points and 1 rebound.

On September 23, 2018, Giga signed with Rytas Vilnius.

On August 8, 2019, Giga signed a three-year deal with Juventus Utena of the Lithuanian Basketball League. He averaged 6.8 points and 3.3 rebounds per game. On July 17, 2020, he signed with Neptūnas Klaipėda of the Lithuanian Basketball League.

In August 2022, Giga signed with Haukar of the Icelandic Úrvalsdeild karla.

In February 2024, Giga signed with Álftanes for the rest of the season.

On July 13, 2024, Giga signed with the Kanazawa Samuraiz of the B3 League. On December 3, his contract was terminated. Later he signed with the Prawira Bandung of the Indonesian Basketball League (IBL).

== National team career ==
Giga represented Lithuania junior times twice during the 2012 FIBA Under-17 World Championship and 2013 FIBA Europe Under-18 Championship.
