= Julius Kazakauskas =

Lithuanian basketball player (born 1990)

No. 2 – BC Gargždai
- Position: Power forward
- League: LKL

Personal information
- Born: December 22, 1990 (age 35) Klaipėda, Lithuania
- Listed height: 1.96 m (6 ft 5 in)
- Listed weight: 98 kg (216 lb)

Career information
- Playing career: 2010–present

Career history
- 2010–2012: Nafta-Universitetas Klaipėda
- 2012–2013: Olimpas Plungė
- 2013–2014: Trakai
- 2014–2015: Nafta-Universitetas Klaipėda
- 2015–2016: Lietkabelis Panevėžys
- 2016–2017: Dzūkija Alytus
- 2017–2018: BC Pieno žvaigždės
- 2018–2019: University of Tartu
- 2019–2021: Nevėžis Kėdainiai
- 2021–2022: ALM Évreux Basket
- 2022–present: BC Gargždai-SC

Career highlights
- 2× Lithuanian League rebounding leader (2017, 2021)

Julius Kazakauskas (born December 22, 1990, in Klaipėda) is a Lithuanian professional basketball player for the BC Gargždai-SC of the Lietuvos krepšinio lyga (LKL). He plays for power forward position.
