= Kėdainiai Arena =

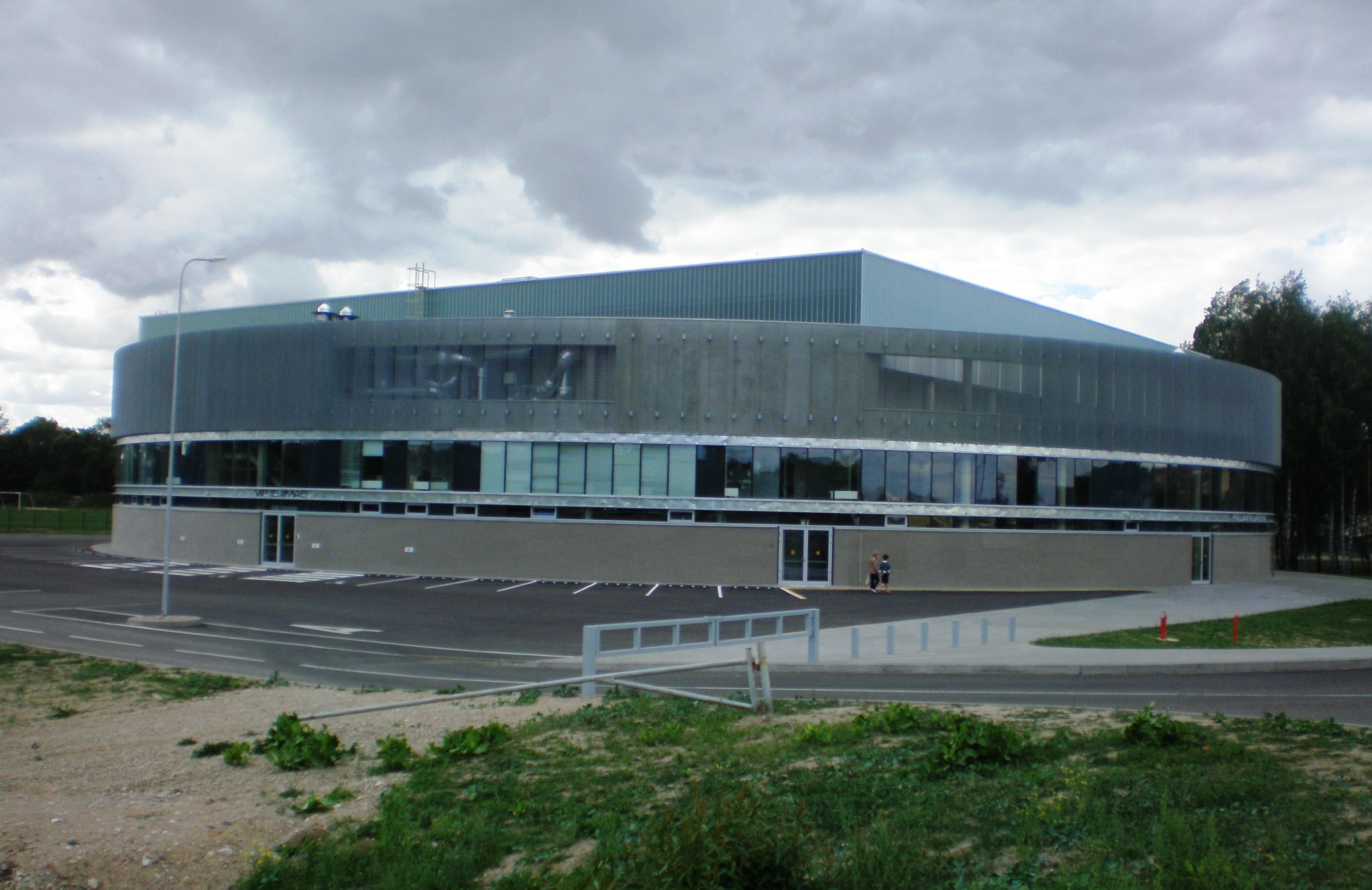
- Interactive map of Kėdainiai Arena
- Address: J. Basanavičiaus g. 1A
- Location: Kėdainiai, Lithuania
- Coordinates: 55°17′54″N 23°59′27″E
- Owner: Kėdainiai District Municipality
- Capacity: Basketball: 2,200; Concerts: 3,000

Construction
- Groundbreaking: 2012
- Opened: August 5, 2013
- Cost: 17.5 million LTL

Tenant
- BC Nevėžis

Kėdainiai Arena is a multifunctional arena in Kėdainiai between Kėdainiai Stadium and Nevėžis River. It was opened on August 5, 2013.
