= Pieno žvaigždės Arena =

Multifunctional arena in Pasvalys, Lithuania

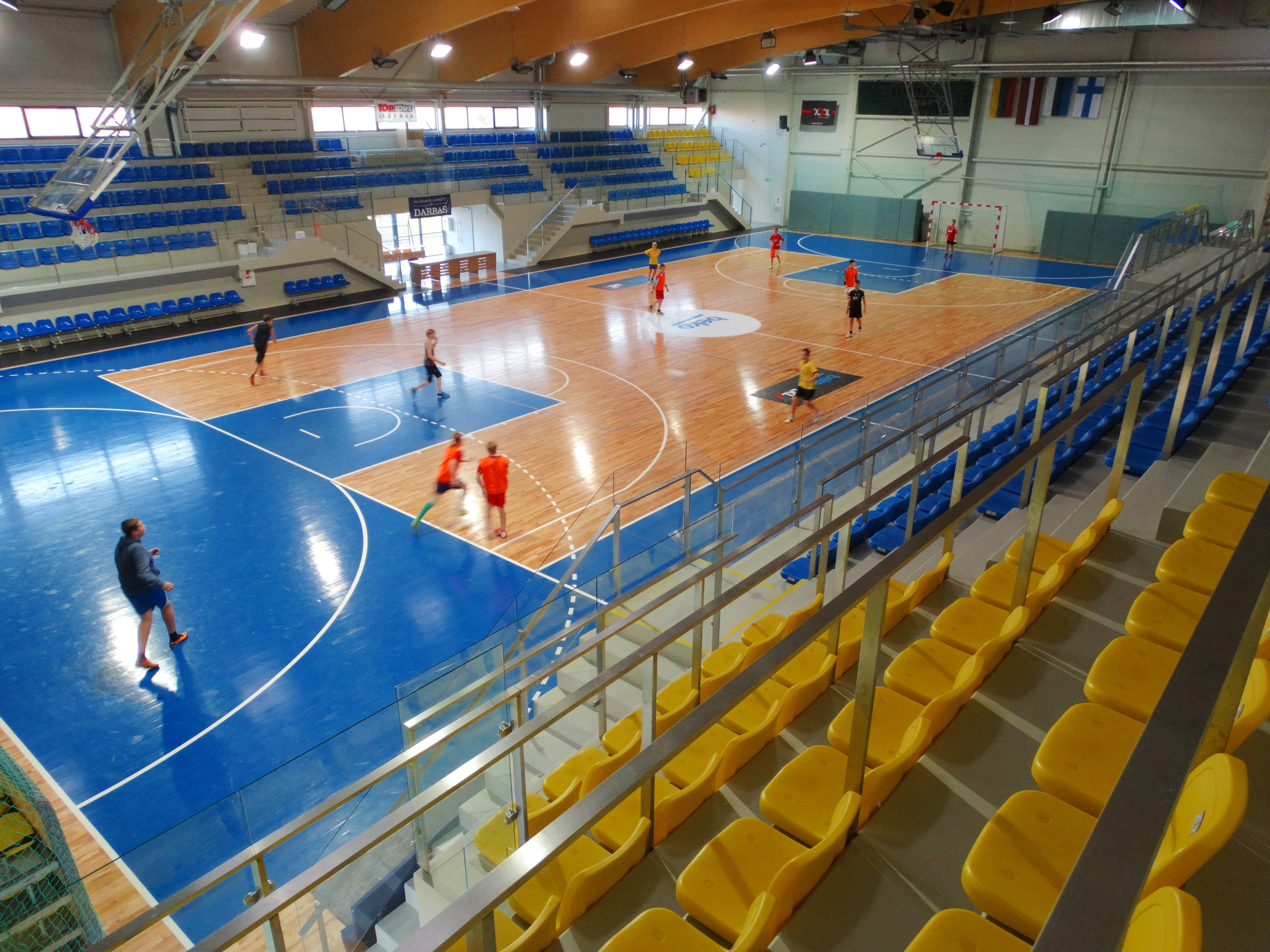
- Interactive map of Pieno žvaigždės Arena
- Address: Taikos g. 22
- Location: Pasvalys, Lithuania
- Coordinates: 56°03′41″N 24°24′49″E
- Capacity: Basketball: 1,500

Construction
- Opened: November 12, 2011
- Cost: 15.8 million LTL

Tenant
- BC Pieno žvaigždės

Website
- pasvaliosm.lt

Pieno žvaigždės Arena is a small multifunctional arena in Pasvalys. It was opened in 2011. Arena's capacity is 1,500 spectators. It has running tracks, pit, separate boxing hall, 25-meter three-pool tracks and a bathhouse complex.

== Gallery ==
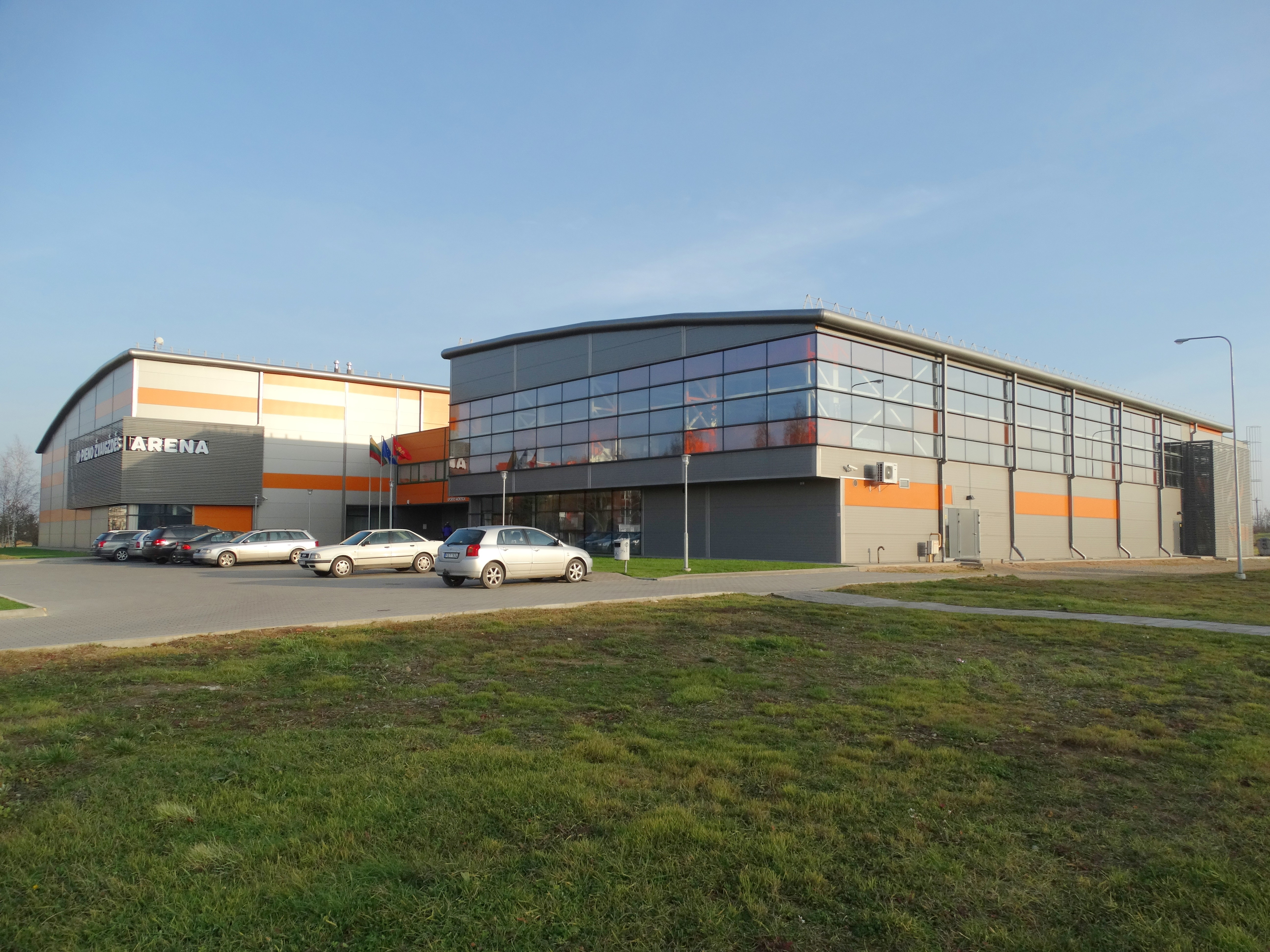
Façade of the Arena
